= List of Israeli inventions and discoveries =

This is a list of inventions and discoveries by Israeli scientists and researchers, working locally or overseas.

== Mathematics ==
- Johnson–Lindenstrauss lemma, a mathematical result concerning low-distortion embeddings of points from high-dimensional into low-dimensional Euclidean space contributed by Joram Lindenstrauss.
- Development of the measurement of rigidity by Elon Lindenstrauss in ergodic theory, and their applications to number theory.
- A proof of Szemerédi's theorem using ergodic theory, by mathematician Hillel Furstenberg.
- Expansion of axiomatic set theory and the ZF set theory by Abraham Fraenkel.
- Development of the area of automorphic forms and L-functions by Ilya Piatetski-Shapiro.
- Development of Sauer–Shelah lemma and Shelah cardinal.
- Development of the first proof of the alternating sign matrix conjecture.
- Development of Zig-zag product of graphs, a method of combining smaller graphs to produce larger ones used in the construction of expander graphs by Avi Wigderson.
- Development of Bernstein–Sato polynomial and proof of the Kazhdan–Lusztig conjectures by Joseph Bernstein
- Generalization of the marriage theorem by obtaining the right transfinite conditions for infinite bipartite graphs. He subsequently proved the appropriate versions of the Kőnig theorem and the Menger theorem for infinite graphs by Ron Aharoni.
- Development of the Amitsur–Levitzki theorem by Shimshon Amitsur.
- The Benjamini-Hochberg procedure for controlling the False discovery rate, a statistical method for regulating Type I errors.

== Science ==
=== Chemistry ===
- Discovery of quasicrystals by Dan Shechtman of the Technion. The discovery led him to receive the 2011 Nobel Prize in Chemistry.
- Discovery of the role of protein Ubiquitin by Avram Hershko and Aaron Ciechanover of the Technion Institute (together with the American biologist Irwin Rose). The discovery led them to receive the 2004 Nobel Prize in Chemistry.
- Increased understanding of how proteins are made - Ada Yonath of Israel alongside Venkatraman Ramakrishnan of India and Thomas A. Steitz of the US shared the 2009 Nobel Prize in Chemistry for increased understanding of the structure and function of ribosomes.
- Development of multiscale models for complex chemical systems by Arieh Warshel and Michael Levitt of the Weizmann Institute of Science (presently at University of Southern California and Stanford University, respectively), together with the Austrian-born American chemist Martin Karplus. The discovery led them to receive the 2013 Nobel Prize in Chemistry.
- Discovery and Isolation of the Tetrahydrocannabinol (THC), a cannabinoid found in cannabis, by Raphael Mechoulam while working in the Weizmann Institute of Science, 1964.

=== Physics ===
- Discovery of the Aharonov–Bohm effect by Yakir Aharonov and David Bohm.
- Jacob Bekenstein was the first to propose Black holes also have Entropy while working in the Hebrew University of Jerusalem.
- Discovery and classification of hadrons through the SU(3) flavour symmetry, led to the development of Eightfold way, by Yuval Ne'eman, 1961.

=== Optics ===
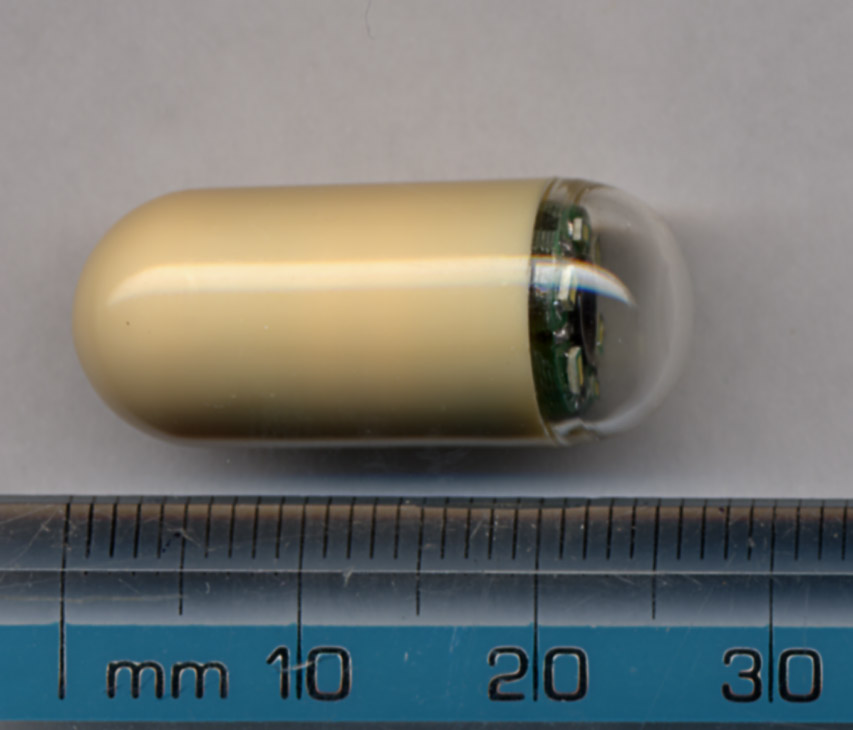
Endoscopic capsule

- Pillcam by Given Imaging, the first Capsule Endoscopy solution to record images of the digestive tract. The capsule is the size and shape of a pill and contains a tiny camera. Created by Israeli engineer Gavriel Iddan who sold the company to Irish medical device maker Covidien for $860 million. Iddan has expressed regret for the sale due to the companies fulfillment of an ancient Jewish prophecy “The Pillcam was based on military technology... It was a good example of how we shall beat our swords into plowshares", as the Hebrew prophets predicted. Covidien was acquired by Medtronic in 2016, and is now the provider of Pillcam.
- Line free single power bicentric prismatic spectacle lens for correction of anisometropia. Sydney J. Bush UK patent no. 1539381.

=== Medicine ===
- The flexible stent, also known as NIR Stent or EluNIR. Developed by Israeli company Medinol, which is headquartered in Tel Aviv.
- The pressure bandage - known widely as the Israeli Bandage is a specially designed, first-aid device that is used to stop bleeding from hemorrhagic wounds caused by traumatic injuries in pre-hospital emergency situations. First used for saving lives during a NATO peacekeeping operation in Bosnia and Herzegovina, by inventor, Israeli military medic, Bernard Bar-Natan. The bandage was successfully used during operations Enduring Freedom and Iraqi Freedom and is widely used today, across the world. The bandage was nicknamed "Israeli bandage" by American soldiers, and has been "the bandage of choice for the US Army and special forces". Before the Israeli emergency bandage was invented in 1998, wounded soldiers were told to find a rock and wrap it on top of hemorrhaging wounds in order to hold direct pressure. Bar-Natan sold his company to PerSys Medical Inc in Houston, Texas, the company that first introduced the bandage to the US military.
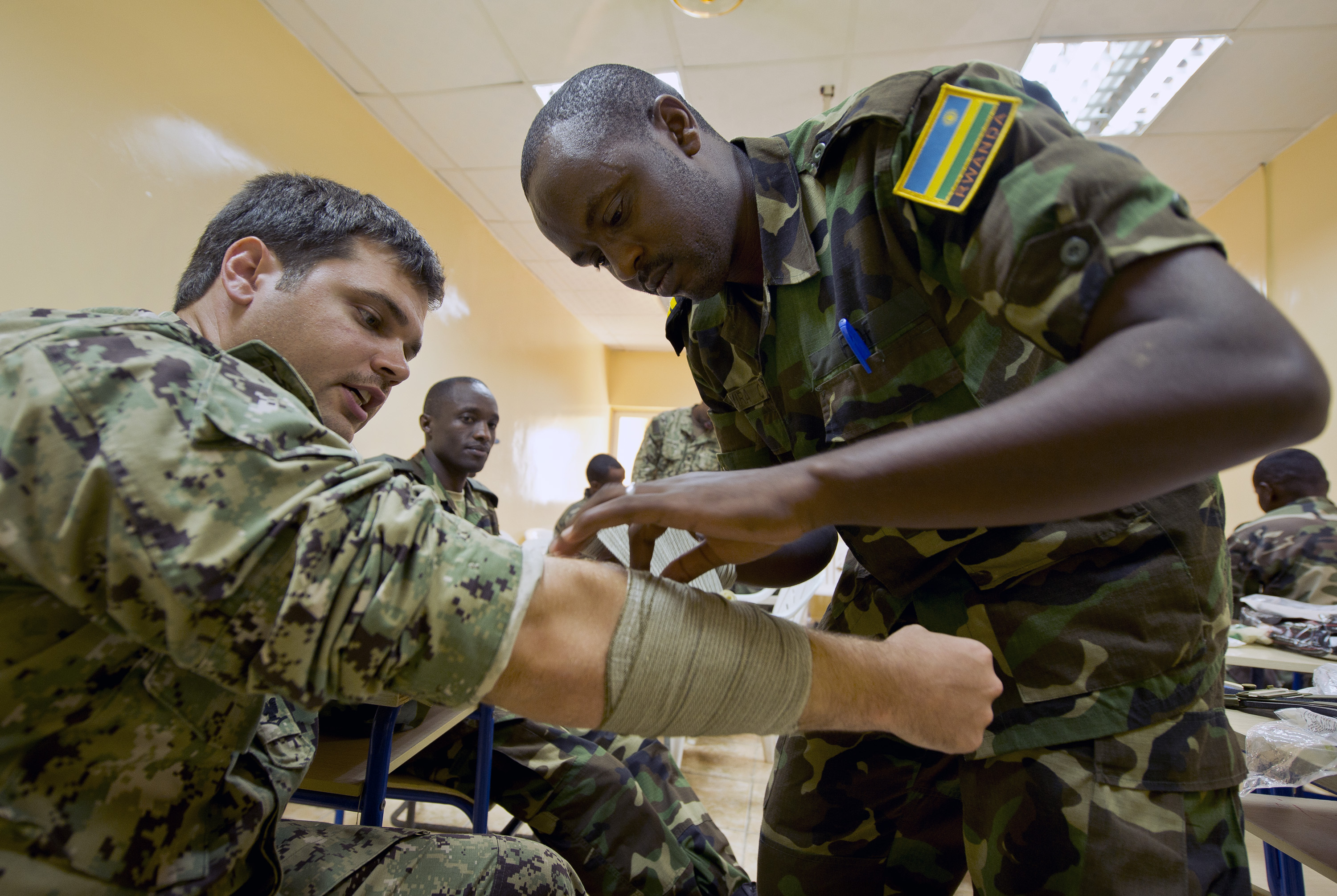
  An Israeli Bandage being used by Sudanese and US Naval service members during a training exercise.
- Eshkol-Wachman Movement Notation – a notation system for recording movement on paper that has been used in many fields, including dance, physical therapy, animal behavior and early diagnosis of autism.
- Development of the Copaxone immunomodulator drug for treating multiple sclerosis. It was developed in the Weizmann Institute of Science in Israel by Michael Sela, Ruth Arnon and Deborah Teitelbaum.
- Development of bioengineered recombinant interferon proteins by Michel Revel from the Weizmann Institute of Science in Israel.
- Development of taliglucerase alfa (Elelyso), a recombinant glucocerebrosidase enzyme produced from transgenic carrot cell cultures. Taliglucerase alfa won approval from the U.S. Food and Drug Administration in May 2012 as an orphan drug for the treatment of Type 1 Gaucher's disease.
- Development of ENvue, a feeding tube placement system with advanced methods of navigation, integrated sensors and body mapping, for accurate enteral tube placement, by the Israeli company ENvizion Medical, used in Hospitals and Medical centers in the US.
- Development of engineered recombinant Chimeric Antigen Receptors by Professor Zelig Eshhar of the Weizmann Institute of Science and his trainee Gideon Gross, today a component of novel cell-based immunotherapy for various cancers.
- Development of Azilect, a drug for Parkinson's disease, by Moussa Youdim and John Finberg from the Technion - Israel Institute of Technology, and commercialized by Teva Pharmaceutical Industries.
- PillCam – a swallowable, capsule-sized endoscopy device containing a miniature camera, developed by Gavriel Iddan and Gabriel Meron at Given Imaging, which transmits high-resolution images of the gastrointestinal tract to non-invasively diagnose disorders such as Crohn's disease, internal bleeding, and tumors.
- ReWalk – a bionic wearable exoskeleton system developed by Amit Goffer that enables individuals with lower-limb paralysis and spinal cord injuries to stand upright, walk, and navigate stairs, receiving FDA clearance in 2014.
- ExAblate – a non-invasive surgical platform developed by Insightec utilizing Magnetic Resonance-guided Focused Ultrasound (MRgFUS) to thermally target and destroy uterine fibroids, essential tremor, and deep-brain structures without open incisions or ionizing radiation.
- Mazor Robotics Surgical Guidance Systems – robotic navigation platforms developed by Moshe Shoham and Ilana Nisky at the Technion that provide spine surgeons with real-time 3D anatomical visualization and sub-millimeter precision during delicate spinal fusion and screw placement operations.
- ProSense Cryoablation System – a minimally invasive medical device developed by IceCure Medical using liquid nitrogen to freeze and destroy benign and malignant tumors in organs such as the breast and kidneys as an alternative to surgical removal.
- EarlySense – a contact-free patient monitoring system using a sensor unit placed beneath a hospital mattress to continuously measure heart rate, respiratory rate, and movement without attached wires or physical contact, enabling early clinical detection of patient deterioration.
- Invu by Nuvo – an FDA-cleared remote pregnancy monitoring system utilizing a multi-sensor belt and algorithms to track fetal heart rate, maternal heart rate, and uterine contractions outside of clinical settings.
- MeMed Key – a rapid point-of-care diagnostic platform developed by MeMed that analyzes host-immune response proteins (TRAIL, IP-10, and CRP) from a blood sample to distinguish between bacterial and viral infections within 15 minutes.
- CorNeat KPro – a synthetic artificial cornea developed by CorNeat Vision engineered with a bio-integrating skirt that enables surrounding human ocular tissue to integrate into the implant without relying on donor corneas.
- Nano Retina (NR600 Implant) – an ultra-miniaturized electronic artificial retina designed to be implanted in the central macula underneath damaged retinal tissue to stimulate surviving optic nerve cells and restore vision loss caused by degenerative retinal diseases.

=== Economics ===
- Work of Daniel Kahneman and Amos Tversky of the Hebrew University of Jerusalem explaining irrational human economic choices. The work led Daniel to receive the 2002 Nobel Prize in Economics.
- Developments in Game theory. Israel Aumann of the Hebrew University of Jerusalem received the 2005 Nobel Prize in Economics for his work in this field.
- The Rubinstein bargaining model, one of the most influential findings in game theory, refers to a class of bargaining games that feature alternating offers through an infinite time horizon. The proof is from Ariel Rubinstein 1982.

=== Biotechnology ===
Eshkol-Wachman Movement Notation

- Nanowire – a conductive wire made of a string of tiny particles of silver, a thousand times thinner than a human hair. Developed by Uri Sivan, Erez Braun and Yoav Eichen from Technion.
- World's smallest DNA computing machine system – "the smallest biological computing device" ever constructed, according to Guinness Book of Records, which is composed of enzymes and DNA molecules capable of performing simple mathematical calculations and which uses its input DNA molecule as its sole source of energy. Developed in 2003 in the Weizmann Institute of Science by professor Ehud Shapiro and his team.
- OrCam MyEye, is a portable, artificial vision device that allows the visually impaired to understand text and identify objects through audio feedback describing what such people are unable to see.
- TraitUP – a new technology that enables the introduction of genetic materials into seeds without modifying their DNA, immediately and efficiently improving plants before they're even sowed. It was developed by Hebrew University agricultural scientists Ilan Sela and Haim D. Rabinowitch.

=== Theoretical computer science ===
- RSA public key encryption, introduced by Adi Shamir with Ron Rivest, and Leonard Adleman
- The concept of nondeterministic finite automatons, introduced by Michael O. Rabin
- Amir Pnueli introduced temporal logic into computing science
- Lempel–Ziv–Welch algorithm, a universal lossless data compression algorithm created by Abraham Lempel and Jacob Ziv of the Technion institute, together with the American Information theorist, Terry Welch.
- Feige–Fiat–Shamir identification scheme - a type of parallel zero-knowledge proof developed by Uriel Feige, Amos Fiat, and Adi Shamir in 1988.

== Computing ==
- The Intel 8088 – This microprocessor, designed at Intel's Haifa laboratory, powered the first PC that IBM built, which is credited with kickstarting the PC revolution. The 8088 was designed in Israel at Intel's Haifa laboratory. The widespread use of the IBM's PC, using the 8088 processor, established the use of x86 architecture as a de facto standard for decades. The IEEE wrote that "almost all the world’s PCs are built around CPUs that can claim the 8088 as an ancestor." Intel has credited the 8088 with launching the company into the Fortune 500.
- Quicktionary Electronic dictionary – a pen-sized scanner able to scan words or phrases and immediately translate them into other languages, or keep them in memory in order to transfer them to the PC. Developed by the company Wizcom Technologies Ltd.
- Kernel-based Virtual Machine, was developed by Avi Kivity at Qumranet in 2006.
- Laser Keyboard – a virtual keyboard is projected onto a wall or table top and allows to type handheld computers and cell phones. Developed simultaneously by the Israeli company Lumio and Silicon Valley startup company Canesta. The company subsequently licensed the technology to Celluon of Korea.
- Stateful Inspection as part of firewalls - Although academic work on this had been performed by others, Gil Schwed and Nir Zuk, at Israeli company Checkpoint, released the first commercial, stateful firewall.
- TDMoIP (TDM over IP) − in telecommunications, the emulation of time-division multiplexing (TDM) over a packet-switched network (PSN), developed by engineers at RAD Data Communications
- Voice over Internet Protocol (VoIP) - technology for voice based communications using the internet instead of traditional telephone systems. VoIP was originally conceived by Danny Cohen, an Israeli-American scientist, but was first created, implemented, and commercialized by Netanya-based, Israeli company VocalTec and its founder Alon Cohen
- Thunderbolt, a widely used interface technology, was developed as a joint venture between Apple Inc and Intel, in Israel
- The first instant messaging (IM) service, ICQ. Originally developed by the Israeli company Mirabilis in 1996. Mirabilis invented a system for creating unique identifiers (UINs) that could be applied over IRC leading it to be the first widely adopted IM service.
- Umoove, a high-tech startup company that invented a software only solution for face and eye tracking is located in Israel.
- EPROM - a type of programmable read-only memory (PROM) chip that retains its data when its power supply is switched off. invented by Dov Frohman in 1971. led to the development of Intel MCS-48 and other microcontrollers.
- Network Vault - A system for secure data storage, exchange and/or sharing through a protected central storage facility, containing at least one "network vault" to which access is controlled through a single data access channel. developed by Alon Nisim Cohen and is used for Israeli software company CyberArk.
- FaceID, the Apple Inc facial recognition software used in iPhone devices. FaceID is based on technology created by Israeli companies PrimeSense, which was bought by Apple Inc. for $360 million on November 24, 2013, and RealFace
- USB flash drive – a flash memory data storage device integrated with a USB interface. The Israeli company M-Systems (in partnership with IBM) claims to have developed and manufactured the first USB flash drives available in North America. This claim is challenged by multiple companies in the following three countries which also independently developed USB technology: Singapore (Trek Technology), the People's Republic of China (PRC) (Netac Technology) and the Republic of China (Taiwan). See USB Flash drive § Patent controversy.
- WAF - a specific form of application firewall that filters, monitors, and blocks HTTP traffic to and from a web service. Developed by Gili Raanan

=== Robotics ===
- ReWalk a bionic walking assistance system that enables paraplegics to stand upright, walk and climb stairs.
- Development of robotic guidance system for spine surgery by Mazor Robotics.

== Defense, Aviation and Military ==
- Iron Dome – a mobile air defense system in development by Rafael Advanced Defense Systems and Israel Aircraft Industries designed to intercept short-range rockets and artillery shells. On April 7, 2011, the system successfully intercepted a Grad rocket launched from Gaza, marking the first time in history a short-range rocket was ever intercepted. The Iron Dome was later utilized more fully in the Israeli-Gaza conflict of 2012, where it displayed a very high rate of efficiency (95%–99%) in intercepting enemy projectiles. The United States had provided financial assistance in millions of dollars in developing the Iron Dome.
- The Uzi submachine gun was developed by Maj. Uziel Gal in the 1950s.
- IMI Tavor TAR-21 is an Israeli bullpup assault rifle.
- Desert Eagle a large-caliber pistol.
- Barrel bomb - an improvised unguided bomb. first used by the Israeli Air Force during the 1948 Arab–Israeli War.
- Sponge bomb - a specialized device designed to seal the end of a tunnel. Developed by the Israel Defense Forces (IDF) to address the use of tunnels by Hamas in Gaza.
- CornerShot - a weapon accessory created by Lt. Col. Amos Golan of the Israel Defense Forces in cooperation with American investors.
- Ukraine Siren Alerts - a siren alert electronic system created by Israeli student Bernard 'Boaz' Moerdler in 2022.
- Tactical Robotics Cormorant - a flying car unmanned aerial vehicle (UAV) built by Tactical Robotics Ltd. Invented by Rafi Yoeli in Yavne, Israel.
- Wall radar – a unique radar utilizing Ultra Wide Band (UWB) to allow users to see through walls. Developed by the Israeli company Camro.
- Protector USV is an unmanned surface vehicle, developed by the Rafael Advanced Defense Systems. It is the first of its kind to be used in combat.
- Trophy APS - an Active Protection System designed to protect vehicles from incoming threats, such as Rocket-propelled grenade rounds and ATGMs by firing charges to intercept them after detecting and tracking them.

== Agriculture ==
- Plastic emitter for practical surface drip irrigation - developed in Israel by Simcha Blass and his son Yeshayahu in 1959. Rather than allowing water to flow through small holes that could easily be clogged by fine particles, this method directed it through wider and longer channels, using friction within a plastic emitter to slow the flow. The technology is widely used in arid and semi-arid areas all over the world.
- The Tomaccio cherry tomato was developed by several Israeli laboratories, the dominant ones being those led by Professor Nahum Keidar and Professor Chaim Rabinovitch from the Agriculture Faculty of the Hebrew University of Jerusalem, Rehovot Campus.
- The Israeli GFA company which allows fish to be raised virtually anywhere by eliminating the environmental problems in conventional fish farming, without being dependent on electricity or proximity to a body of water.
- Mirtra – a Tal-Ya Water Technologies agricultural technology invention. A unique, patented polypropelyne Mitra system that covers the plant's root system, directing water and fertilizer directly to the root, while protecting the earth around the root from weeds and extreme temperatures, reducing the need to water crops by up to 50 percent. It also reduces fertilizer needs by 50% and functions as an alternative to herbicide (weed-killer).
- Hybrid cucumber seeds – In the 1950s, Prof. Esra Galun of the Weizmann Institute developed hybrid seed production of cucumbers and melons, disease-resistant cucumbers and cucumbers suitable for mechanical harvesting. Galun and his colleagues invented a technique for producing hybrid cucumber seeds without hand pollination.

== Energy ==
- Super iron battery – A new class of a rechargeable electric battery based on a special kind of iron. More environment friendly because the super-iron eventually rusts, it was developed by Stuart Licht. of the University of Massachusetts.

== Consumer goods and appliances ==
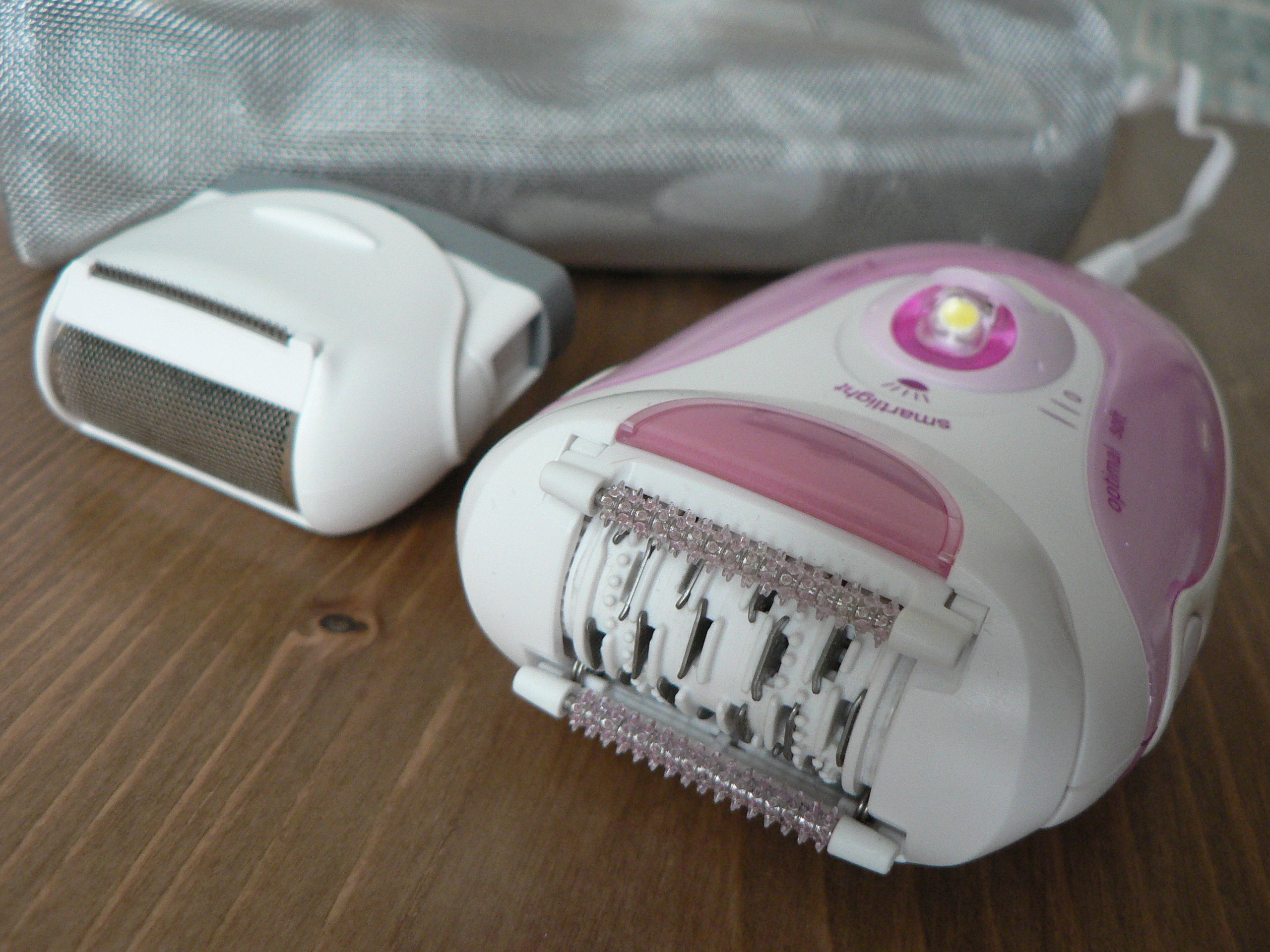
Epilator

- Wonder Pot – a pot developed for baking on the stovetop rather than in an oven.

== Games ==
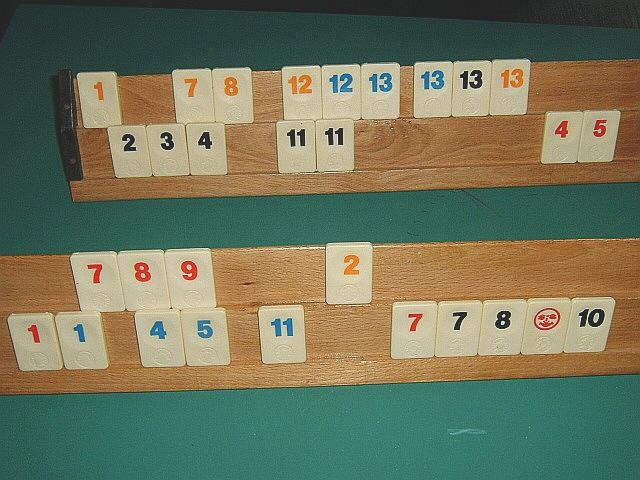
Rummikub

- Rummikub – a tile-based game for two to four players invented by Ephraim Hertzano.
- Mastermind – an Israeli board game invented by Mordecai Meirowitz.
- Guess Who? – a two-player guessing game invented by Theo & Ora Coster (a.k.a. Theora Design).
- Hidato – a logic puzzle game invented by mathematician Gyora Benedek.
- Taki – an Israeli card game invented by Haim Shafir.
- Clawee - a claw machine game, played online on real arcade machines, invented by the Israeli company Gigantic.
- Go Pop (today named Pop it) - popular fidget toy consisting of a usually-brightly colored silicone tray with poppable bubbles, similar to bubble wrap, that can be flipped and re-used. invented in 1975 by Theo and Ora Coster.

== Food and drink ==
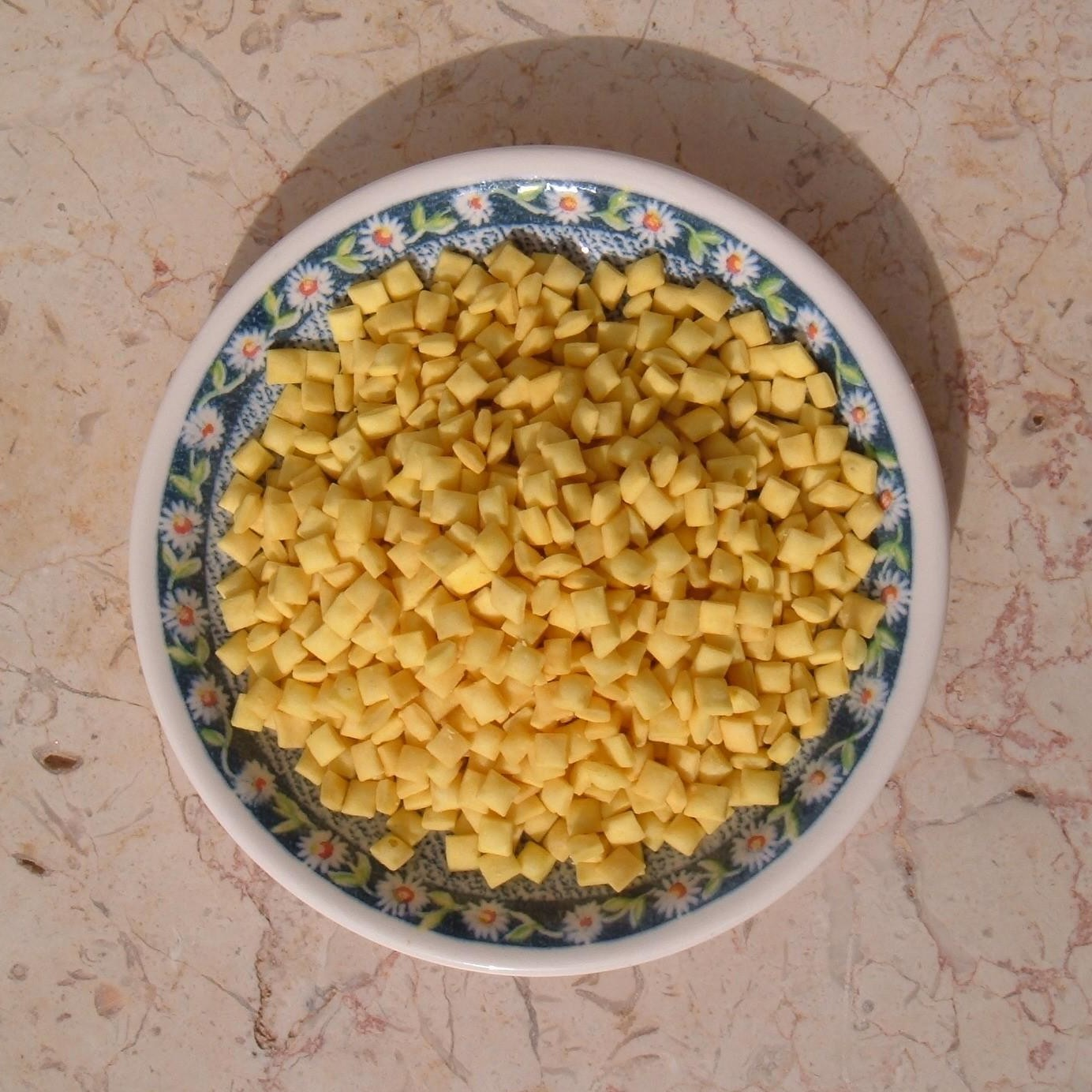
Shkedei marak (croutons)

- Shkedei marak is an Israeli food product consisting of crisp mini croutons used as a soup accompaniment.
- Bamba is a peanut butter-flavored snack food manufactured by the Osem corporation in Holon, Israel. In a clinical trial published in the New England Journal of Medicine, infants exposed to Bamba had an overall 86% reduction in the development of a peanut allergy, measured at age 5.
- Bissli is an Israeli wheat snack produced by Nestle-owned Osem. Bissli is Osem's leading snack brand after Bamba.
- Jerusalem mixed grill is a grilled meat dish considered a specialty of Jerusalem. It consists of chicken hearts, spleens and livers mixed with bits of lamb cooked on a flat grill, seasoned with onion, garlic, juniper berries, black pepper, cumin, turmeric and coriander
- Sabich is a sandwich, consisting of a pita stuffed with fried eggplant and hard-cooked eggs. Local consumption is said to have stemmed from a tradition among Iraqi Jews, who ate it on Shabbat morning.
- Ptitim - also called Israeli couscous worldwide, is a wheat-based baked pasta. It was initially invented during the austerity period in Israel when rice and semolina were scarce.
- Ziva - an Israeli dish made of puff pastry topped with sesame seeds. invented by Ziva Twill in 1989
- Shoogi - a type of Israeli energy bar, sometimes consisting of cereal and comes in different flavours. Invented by Talma in 1989.
- Kristal - A series of soda and non-soda drinks made by the Israeli Yapaura-Taburi company since 1958.
- Shalva - a type of a snack made from puffed wheat. Made in Holon, Israel, since the late 1960s.
- Limonana - a variation of mint lemonade. a portmanteau of limon (Hebrew: לימון) 'lemon' and naʿnaʿ (Hebrew: נענע) 'mint'.
- Tropit - A fruit-flavored drink produced by the Israeli company Yapaura-Taburi.

== Physical exercise ==
- Kapap (lit. face-to-face combat) - a type of face-to-face combat system. The system was developed in the late 1930s, within the Jewish Aliyah camps as part of preparatory training before their arrival in Mandatory Palestine.
- Feldenkrais - a type of movement therapy devised by Israeli Moshé Feldenkrais from 1950 to 1984.
- Krav Maga - an Israeli self defence system and martial art, developed by Imi Lichtenfeld from 1948 to 1998.

== Other ==
- DogTV - The first dedicated television network designed for dogs. Created by Israeli Ron Lev and originally launched in Israel.
- Epilator (originally "Epilady") – a feminine beauty product. It was developed and originally manufactured at Kibbutz HaGoshrim.

== See also ==
- Science and technology in Israel
- Yozma Fund
