= Urban Aeronautics X-Hawk =

Theoretical flying car

X-Hawk
- An artist's rendition of the X-Hawk

General information
- Type: Flying car
- Manufacturer: Metro Skyways Ltd.
- Designer: Rafi Yoeli
- Status: In development

History
- First flight: None

The Urban Aeronautics X-Hawk is a proposed flying car designed by Rafi Yoeli in Yavne, Israel, being built by Metro Skyways Ltd., a subsidiary of Yoeli's privately held company, Urban Aeronautics. The firm claims to have flown the car to a height of 90 cm (3 ft), and that greater heights are possible. The X-Hawk and its smaller unmanned version, the Tactical Robotics Cormorant, would be used in search and rescue operations where a helicopter would be useless, or at least very dangerous, such as evacuating people from the upper stories of burning buildings, or delivering and extracting police and soldiers while very close to structures, narrow streets, and confined spaces, with a projected size similar to that of a large van.

== Background ==
Urban Aeronautics Ltd. patented its design as Fancraft. Fancraft technologies had registered 37 patents, with 12 additional patents pending in 2013.

Metro Skyways Ltd. (MSL), a subsidiary of Urban Aeronautics Ltd., led in developing the X-Hawk and exercises exclusive license of manned air-taxi (civil), air-rescue, and medical evacuation markets. Another subsidiary, Tactical Robotics Ltd. (TRL) has taken the lead in developing the Cormorant (formerly AirMule) and exercises exclusive licenses in unmanned military and national security markets.

== Development ==
In 2004, the development and the proof-of-concept vehicle CityHawk completed more than 10 hours of hover testing near Ben Gurion Airport in Israel. Its success encouraged the development of the X-Hawk and the Mule, since renamed Cormorant. Shortly after the X-Hawk LE concept was published by Urban Aeronautics. Development is being done in parallel to the primary effort put into the Tactical Robotics Cormorant.

Urban Aeronautics plans to begin testing its CityHawk eVTOL in 2021.

== Design ==
The X-Hawk is a vertical take-off and landing (VTOL) aircraft with no exposed rotors, configured as a tandem-fan, turbine-powered vehicle. Pilots will use a fly-by-wire multi-channel flight control system, with automatic stabilization, to help control the aircraft and maintain level flight. The ducted fan design allows the car to achieve the speed and maneuverability of a helicopter.

== Variants ==
- CityHawk prototype can carry two people, stay aloft for close to one hour, maximum ceiling estimated to be 8,000 ft (2,400 m), with flight speeds of 150–170 km/h (80–90 kn). Merely 2.2 m × 4.7 m (7.2 ft × 15.4 ft) in size.
- X-Hawk LE is a more powerful version for law enforcement, 1 pilot + 3 officers, 3 h plus reserve at 259 km/h (140 kn).
- X-Hawk EMS is for emergency medical services.

== Partners ==
Urban Aeronautics is in contact with the militaries of the United States (Army), Italy, India, and other nations, for possible sale of the Cormorant.

- Elbit Systems
- Israel Aerospace Industries
- Textron Inc. Bell Helicopter

== Specifications (CityHawk) ==
Data from Metro Skyways

General characteristics

- Crew: 1
- Capacity: 4
- Length: 7.55 m (24 ft 9 in)
- Wingspan: 2.5 m (8 ft 2 in)
- Width: 2.5 m (8 ft 2 in)
- Height: 2.35 m (7 ft 9 in)
- Empty weight: 1,170 kg (2,579 lb)
- Max takeoff weight: 1,930 kg (4,255 lb)
- Fuel capacity: 800l (211 US Gal)
- Powerplant: 2 × Safran Arriel 2N turboshaft, 735 kW (985 hp) each uninstalled T/O power at SL, ISA
- Main rotor diameter: 2 × 2.30 m (7 ft 7 in)
- Main rotor area: 8.3 m^{2} (89 sq ft)

Performance

- Maximum speed: 270 km/h (170 mph, 150 kn)
- Cruise speed: 234 km/h (145 mph, 126 kn)
- Range: 150 km (93 mi, 81 nmi) Pilot + 4, 20 min reserves
- Ferry range: 360 km (220 mi, 190 nmi) Pilot only, 20 min reserves
- Endurance: min fuel flow: 280 kg/h (610 lb/h) at 60 kn (111 km/h)
- Disk loading: 232.3 kg/m^{2} (47.6 lb/sq ft)
- Fuel consumption: 1.68 kg/km (6.0 lb/mi) at 130 kn (241 km/h)
- Power/mass: 0.76 kW/kg (0.46 hp/lb)
- Estimated noise @ 150 ft (46 m): 76 dBA

== See also ==
- Tactical Robotics Cormorant, an unmanned version
- Aerial Reconfigurable Embedded System
- Piasecki VZ-8 Airgeep
