= Bamba (snack) =

Israeli peanut snack

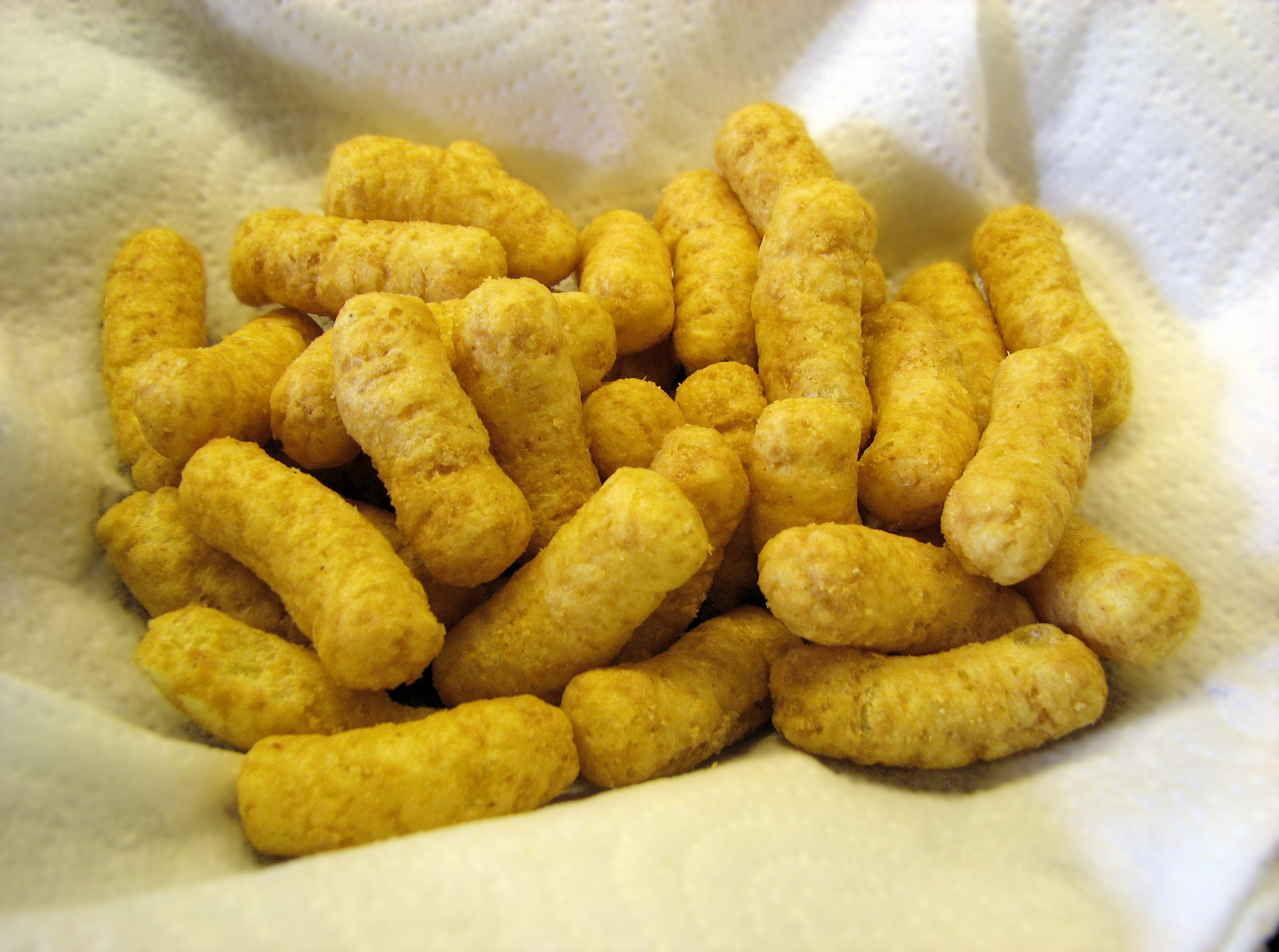
- Peanut-butter-flavored Bamba
- Course: Snack
- Place of origin: Israel
- Created by: Osem
- Main ingredients: Peanuts, maize, Sunflower oil, salt
- Variations: Sweet Bamba, Nougat-filled Bamba, Halva-filled Bamba
- Food energy (per 100 g serving): 544 kcal (2,280 kJ)

Bamba (Hebrew: במבה) is an Israeli snack made of peanut-butter-flavored puffed maize manufactured by the Osem corporation in Kiryat Gat, Israel. Bamba is one of the leading snack foods produced and sold in Israel. It was launched in 1964. Bamba makes up 25% of the Israeli snack market. A similar product called Erdnussflips was introduced in Germany in 1963, which instead of using peanut butter uses peanut dust.

Similar products from other domestic manufacturers include "Parpar" (Literally "Butterfly", Telma, since 2000 a subsidiary of Unilever), "Shush" (Strauss-Elite), "Smoki" (Štark), and "Křupky" (Secalo). Osem named the snack "Bamba" because it sounded like baby talk.

== Overview ==
Bamba is made from peanut-butter-flavored puffed maize. Bamba contains no preservatives or food coloring, is enriched with several vitamins, and contains high amounts of Unsaturated fat. The energy content is 160 calories per 28 grams. Bamba is certified kosher by Badatz Jerusalem. The Washington Post describes it as "Cheez Doodles without the cheese."

== Manufacturing process ==
Corn grits are "popped" under high pressure, turning them into long lines of white, puffed, unflavored Bamba. The lines are cut into nuggets and then moved to a drying chamber where they are air-baked for 20 seconds, which gives them a crispy texture. The peanut butter, imported from Argentina, is added at the end. A worker stands on a step above the rotating drums and pours a pitcher of liquid peanut butter into each of the containers. As the drums turn, the nuggets are coated. The hot Bamba is then moved along a conveyor belt to cool before packaging.

== Variations ==
Israeli package of Bamba.

In 1964, Bamba was trialed with a cheese flavor but proved unpopular and was dropped. Osem quickly changed tack and launched Bamba in different flavors, including corn, grill, caraway and peanut butter, which became the mainstay of Bamba.

Nowadays, Osem also produces strawberry-flavored Bamba (officially called 'Sweet Bamba' Hebrew: במבה מתוקה, Hebrew: במבה אדומה) that is round in shape instead of oblong, and red instead of the usual color. It was originally colored with an artificial red dye, which has since been replaced with beetroot. Another flavour currently in production is Bamba Hazelnut, which has the appearance of regular Bamba but has a brown, creamy filling. In 2008 Osem introduced a new Bamba flavor, nougat-filled, produced at the Osem plant in Sderot. It is considered by the Nestlé group, owner of the controlling interest in Osem, to be one of the great successes of Nestlé in Israel. Osem introduced a halva-filled and a chocolate-filled Bamba in 2010, and a "Bamba-filled Bamba" (a peanut-butter-paste filled Bamba) in 2013. In 2014 Osem introduced a special edition of Bamba and their other popular snack Bissli within the same blue package, named "Bissli-Bamba Mix", another edition of "Mix" included onion-flavor Bissli, packaged in a green pack. In 2015, 60g bags of Bamba bomba were introduced to the market, as well as Banana Punch flavoured Bamba. Coin sized and shaped, "round Bamba" was introduced by the company In 2016, as well as a mini Bamba version of the snack called "Bambini". For Purim 2017, Osem introduced a Pretzel shaped Bamba, and towards the summer of that same year, a caramel biscuit flavoured cream filled Bamba. Ice-coffee filled Bamba was introduced in 2018, and in winter 2019 Osem introduced both Cappuccino cream filled Bamba, as well as Bamba with Chocolate.

In 1963 the Bahlsen company launched a very similar product to the classic Bamba called "Erdnussflips" (peanut flips) in Germany where it remains a staple snack.

Another similar snack appeared in 1972. "Smoki" were introduced to the southeastern European market by the Serbian company Štark (then Soko-Štark). In 1974, similar snack called "Kukuričné chrumky arašidové" (in Pezinok area nicknamed as "cajlanské krevety", which means Cajla shrimps) was introduced by Slovak company Nitrianske mlyny a cestovinárne (in 1991 renamed to Miva).

In 2017 Trader Joe's began offering Bamba under their private label, imported from Osem in Israel.

== Peanut allergy ==
As Bamba is made with peanuts, people allergic to peanuts may be severely affected by it. Early peanut consumption is associated with a lower prevalence of peanut allergy. A 2008 study concluded that, due to the extensive consumption of Bamba by infants in Israel, peanut allergy is rare among Israelis. A control group of Jewish children in the UK had ten times higher rates of allergy; the difference is not accounted for by differences in atopy, social class, genetic background, or peanut allergenicity. The later Learning Early About Peanut Study (LEAP) also showed that high-risk children who were given softened sticks of Bamba in early life had a lower rate of peanut allergy later in life. Children who were exposed to peanuts through Bamba showed an 81% reduction in peanut allergy prevalence. Medical researchers speculate that the case of Bamba consumption in Israel, with the early introduction of peanut in diets, offers lessons for reducing rates of peanut allergy among children. Bamba has the potential to be a less potent and safer substrate for peanut oral immunotherapy compared to raw and roasted peanuts. The snack has decreased IgE binding, lower levels of major allergens, and decreased protein extractability per unit mass.

== Advertising ==
Bamba's advertising features the "Baby Bamba" character heavily. "Bamba Baby" is a cartoon character, depicted wearing a blue diaper. He has one tooth, and is bald except for one ginger curl at the front of his head. In honor of International Women's Day 2020, a female "Baby Bamba" was introduced. Female "Baby Bamba" wears a pink T-shirt and has pigtails. In March 2021 the baseball team New York Mets announced a partnership with the brand.

== See also ==
- Bissli, another snack by Osem
- List of brand name snack foods
