= Emergency Bandage =

Pressure bandage

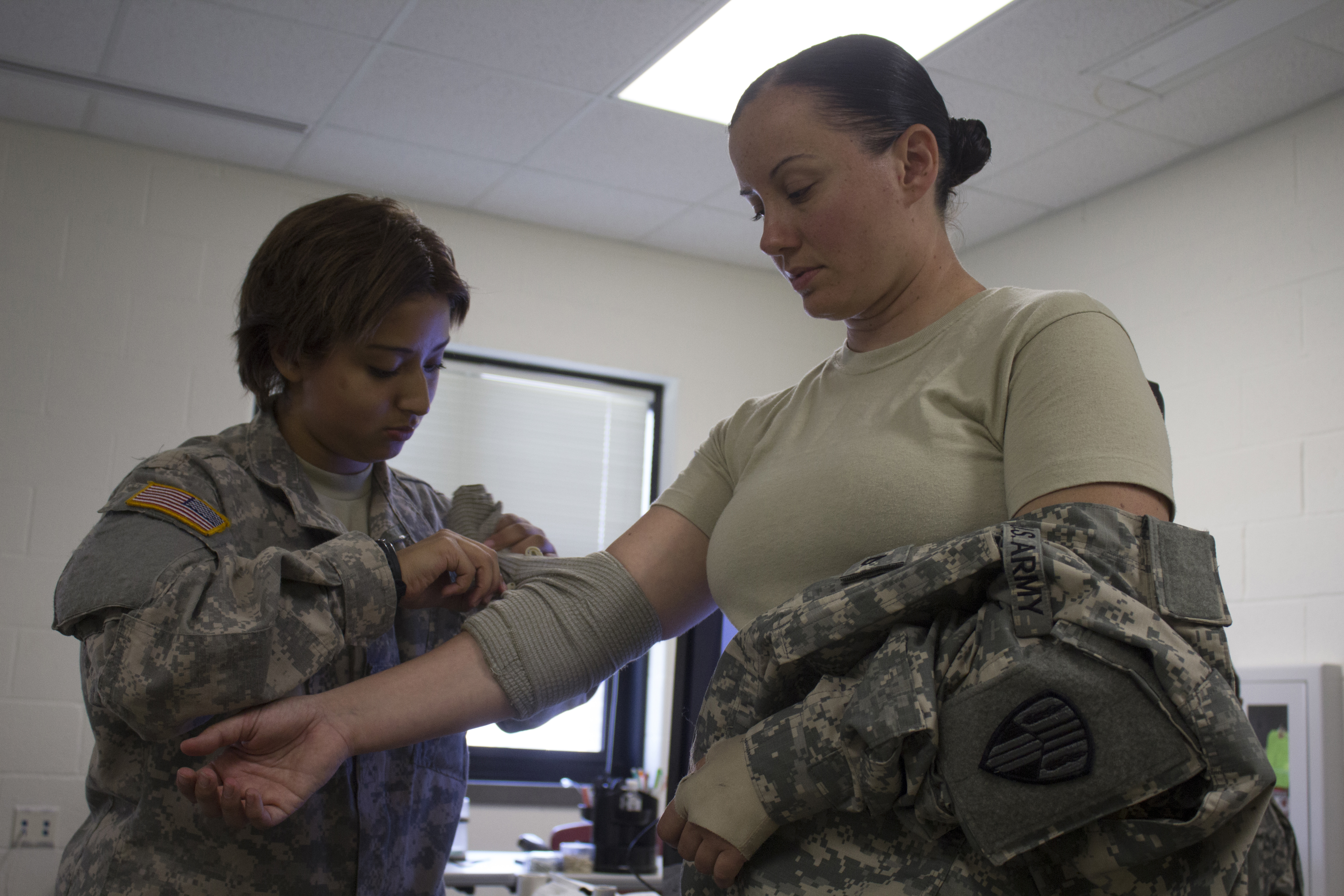
An Israeli bandage being applied

The Emergency Bandage or Israeli bandage is a specially designed, pressure bandage that is used to stop bleeding from hemorrhagic wounds caused by traumatic injuries in pre-hospital emergency situations. First used for saving lives during a NATO peacekeeping operation in Bosnia and Herzegovina, the bandage was successfully used during operations Enduring Freedom and Iraqi Freedom. The bandage was nicknamed "Israeli bandage" by American soldiers and has been "the bandage of choice for the US Army and special forces." The Israeli Bandage was included in the first aid kits of emergency personnel and first responders at the 2011 Tucson shooting, and was used to treat some victims of the shooting.

The bandage was invented by an Israeli military medic, Bernard Bar-Natan, thus creating the nicknames "Israeli bandage", "Israeli" and "Izzy".

== Background ==
For years, one of the most preventable causes of death in non-fatally wounded people has been the inability to quickly and effectively stop bleeding. Military doctors Nolan Shipman and Charles S. Lessard write in Military Medicine journal that "[t]he first step in containing seriously wounded casualties is to control the hemorrhage as much as possible." In the era preceding Operation Enduring Freedom (OEF) and Operation Iraqi Freedom (OIF), US military medics would take wounded soldiers from battlefields to hospitals for treatment. This often resulted in prolonged and irreversible loss of blood. Today, the tactic of caring for wounded soldiers has changed and the wounds are treated in the battlefield. The Israeli Bandage, which can be applied with only one hand, successfully stops bleeding and has been used by the armies of the United States, Germany, Australia, New Zealand, and other countries. David Kleinman, a SWAT team medic who devised a first aid kit used to treat victims of the 2011 Tucson shooting, said that "deputies reached for the Emergency Bandage 'over and over at the scene'" of the shooting.

== History of development ==
When the bandage's inventor, Bernard Bar-Natan, was in training to become an Israeli military medic in 1984, he noticed that the bandages issued for bleeding control had a manufacture date of 1942 or sometimes even 1938. He also noticed that more current styles had the same design and the same features as 1942 bandages. The trainees were advised to grab a stone and to use it to apply pressure to a wound that would not clot on its own. Bar-Natan started work on a new generation of bandages that would not rely on the "grab a stone" approach, but would have a pressure bar built into the bandages themselves.

In 1990–1991, the idea and the design were developed enough to apply for Israeli Government support from the Office of the Chief Scientist in the Ministry of Industry. The application allowed Bar-Natan to become a part of a technology incubator program in Jerusalem's Har Hotzvim, with a government grant covering 3/4 of the expenses connected to the research and development of the bandage. After three additional years of development the bandage was ready for commercialization. However, Bar-Natan formed First Care Products Ltd and supervised the design and production of the bandage.

A Belgian medical equipment distributor bought the first bandages in 1998. Bar-Natan, having grown the company to a profitable entity, later sold it to PerSys Medical in Houston, Texas, the company that first introduced the bandage to the US military. Today 1.5 to 2 million bandages are produced and sold each year.

== Features ==
Application of The Emergency Bandage

The Emergency Bandage is an elasticized bandage with a sewn-in non-adhesive pad.

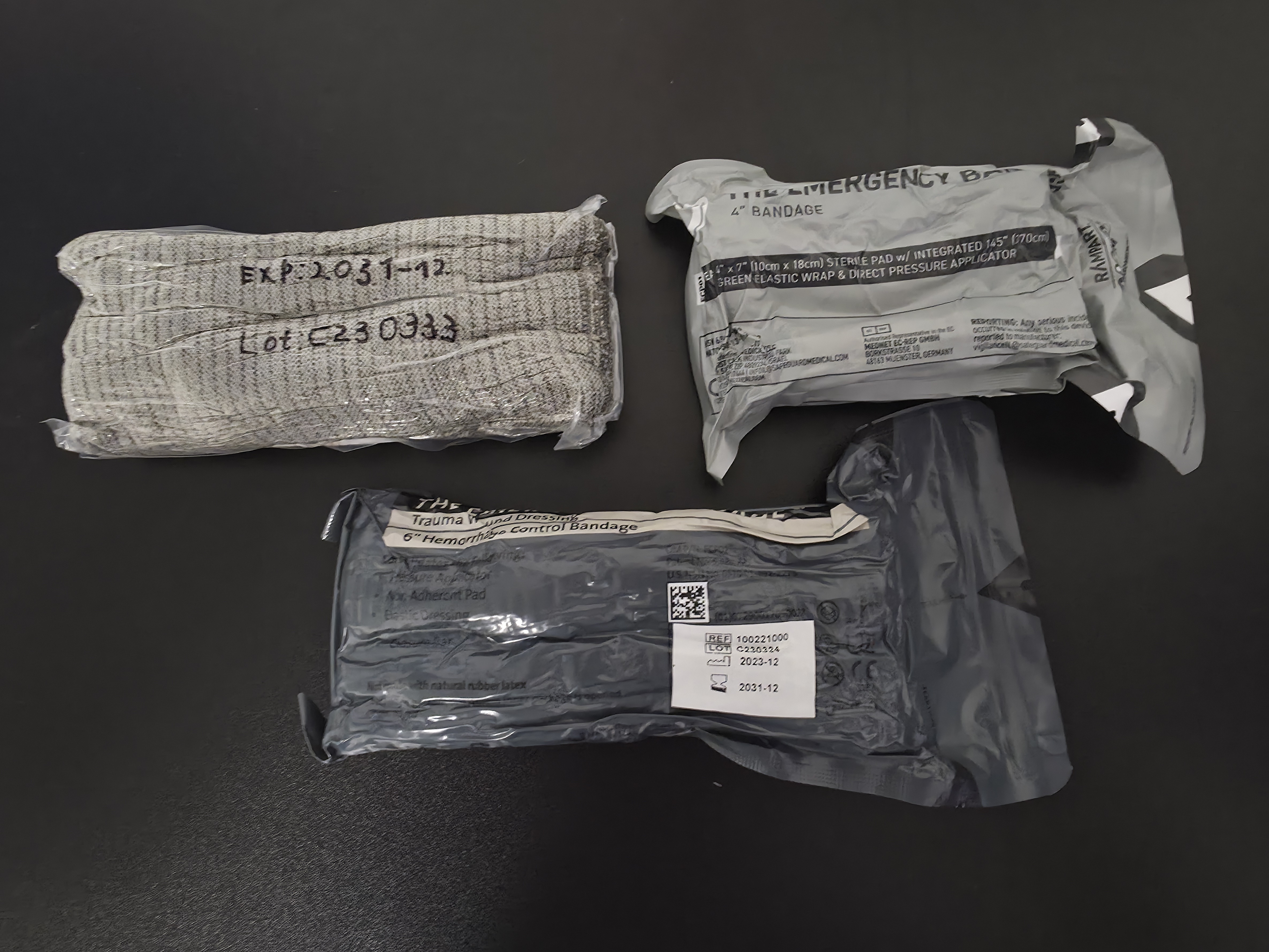
The different packaging layers of the Emergency Bandage

The Emergency Bandage's packaging consists of multiple layers that protect the bandage from becoming damaged and unsterile prior to it being opened; The upper right grey packaging is the newest version of the bandage's outer layer, while the upper left clear, written on wrapper is the bandage's inner layer of packaging. The lower, blue-ish looking bandage is the [old] version of the bandage's first layer of packaging.

They are similar to elastic bandages used to treat sprain injuries, but have three unique features:

1. A sterile non-adherent dressing to enable removing the bandage without reopening a wound.
2. A pressure applicator placed over the wound to stop bleeding by applying pressure. It allows changing the direction of the bandage and wrapping it around the wound once in various directions. It also makes bandaging easier. It is especially useful for stopping bleeding in groin and head injuries.
3. A closure bar at the end of the bandage to secure the bandage and add pressure to a wound. It allows the bandage to clip neatly in place without slipping and can be used by a "sliding motion with one hand."

Newer versions, such as T3 and the 9T, include features such as gauze for additional wrapping, extra pads, abdominal pads to cover eviscerations, and moisture seals to cover wounds and burns.

The bandages come in three sizes: 4, 6, and 8 inches wide.

The bandage was favorably reviewed in the Military Medicine journal.

== See also ==
- Antihemorrhagic
- Esmarch bandage
- Field dressing (bandage)
- List of Israeli inventions and discoveries
