= Smoki =

Peanut-flavoured corn snack from Serbia and ex-Yugoslav countries

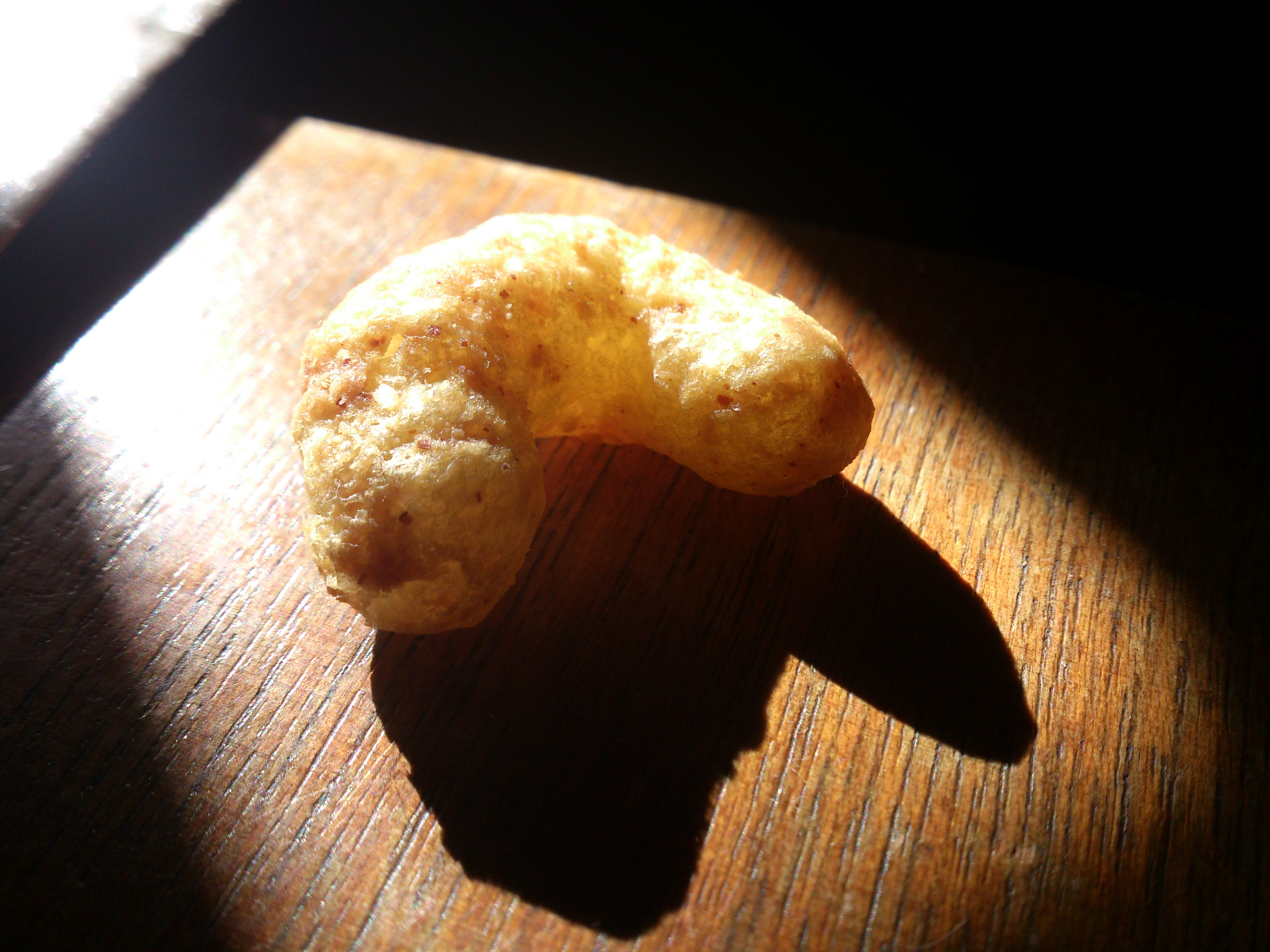
- Product type: Puffed corn snack
- Current owner: Štark
- Country: Serbia
- Introduced: 11 October 1972; 54 years ago
- Markets: Worldwide, primarily in Ex-Yugoslav countries
- Tagline: Gladni zabave en: Hungry for entertainment
- Website: https://smoki.rs/

Smoki (Serbian Cyrillic: Смоки) is a Serbian brand of puffed corn snack, brought to the market by the food company Soko Štark in 1972, as the first of its kind in Southeast Europe. It was originally introduced in the town of Zemun, eventually spreading throughout Yugoslavia, then the Balkans, and around the world. Smoki consists mainly of puffed cornmeal grits, peanut flavoring and salt. Similar foods in other countries consist of Bamba in Israel and Erdnussflips in Germany and Austria.

Its popularity (especially throughout the former Yugoslavia) is such that the name Smoki has become synonymous with any puffed corn snack (also known in these countries as flips).

In September 2006, a chocolate-covered brand of Smoki were released, known as Čoko Smoki with the tagline of Happy End. It also came with flavours of orange and caramel. In 2023, Štark released a version of Smoki with both chocolate and peanut butter filling inside, called Smoki Wow.

== See also ==
- Bamba (snack)
- List of brand name snack foods
