= Kristal (drink) =

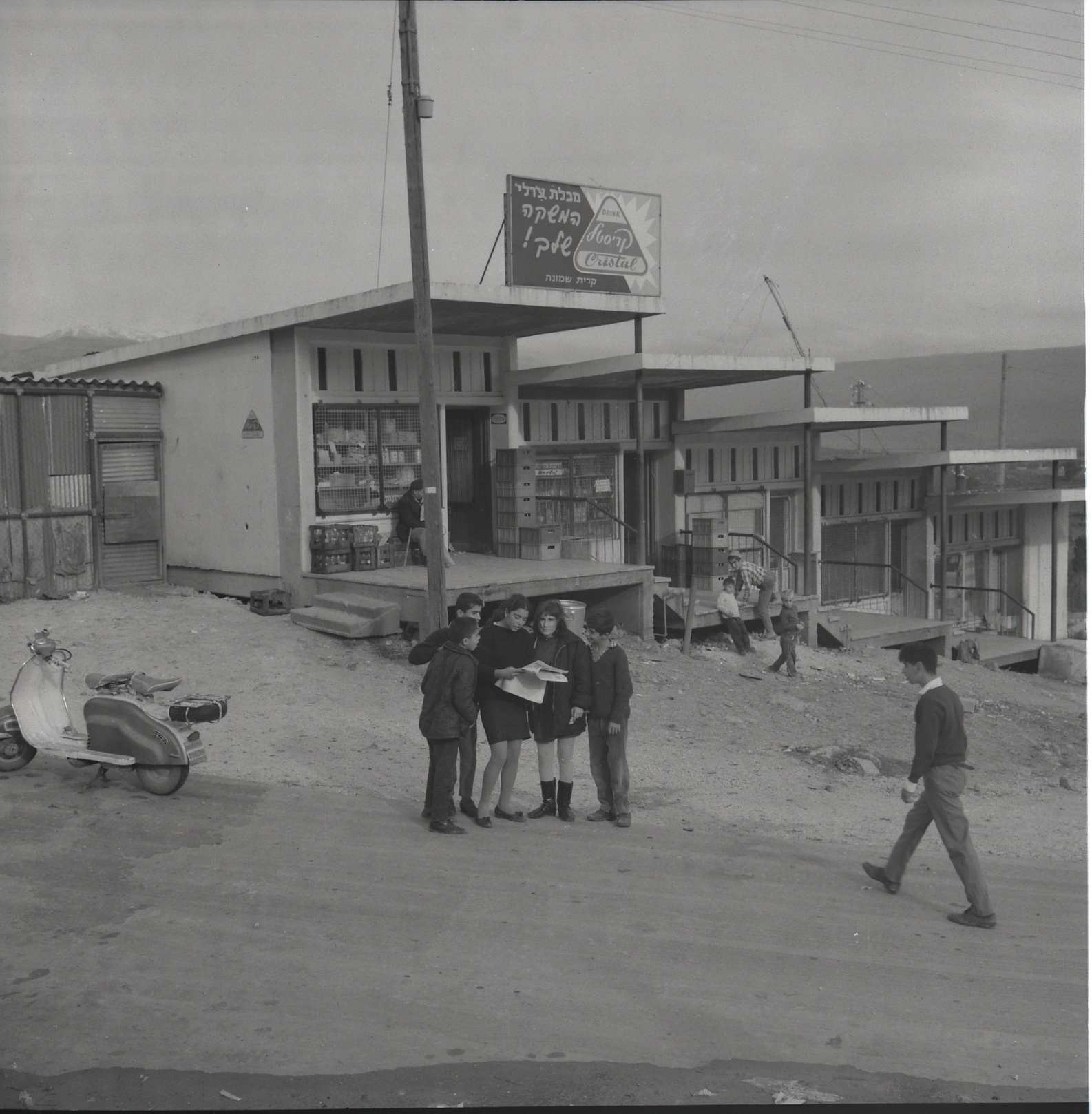
An advertisement sign for Kristal drink on a grocery store in Kiryat Shmona, 1970

Kristal (Hebrew: קריסטל) is a series of drinks produced by the Yafura-Taburi, Israeli soft drinks company, since 1958.

== History ==
The Kristal series was launched in April 1958 by the Tabori company (Yafura-Taburi today) with three flavors: soda water, lemon drink, and orange drink (orange flavored). It was marketed as a healthy drink made from soft water, from which harmful substances had been removed, and without the addition of food colouring or artificial substances. In 1959, Kristal's advertising slogan, "Make a break - Drink Kristal" (הפסקה עשה-קריסטל שתה) was launched.

Initially, the drinks were sold in glass bottles, and the product line included both soft and carbonated beverages. Over the years, the packaging transitioned to plastic bottles. The labels underwent numerous design changes, but the Kristal logo remained consistent throughout, with no significant alterations.

There are two types of drinks in the series:

- Soft drinks flavours: grapefruit, mango, grape, raspberry, orange and diet grapefruit.
- Carbonated drinks flavours: exotic, apple, grapefruit, diet grapefruit, strawberry, lemon-lime, grape, mint, orange and cola.

In preparation for the 75th Independence Day of the State of Israel, a retro-styled version of Kristal in glass bottles was launched.

== Marketing ==
In 1982, the members of Israeli comedy trio HaGashash HaHiver, participated in an advertising campaign for the brand under the slogan "The heat was cancelled, we drink Kristal" (החום בוטל, שותים קריסטל).
