= Štark =

Food and drink companies of Serbia

- Native name: Штарк
- Company type: d.o.o.
- Industry: Food manufacture
- Founded: 3 January 1952; 74 years ago (Current form); 1922; 104 years ago (Founded)
- Headquarters: Belgrade, Serbia
- Key people: Matjaž Vodopivec (Director)
- Products: Branded food, candies, chocolate, biscuits
- Revenue: ▼€95.35 million (2018)
- Net income: ▼€8.80 million (2018)
- Total assets: ▼€88.36 million (2018)
- Total equity: ▲€45.29 million (2018)
- Owner: Droga Kolinska (100%)
- Number of employees: 1,041 (2018)
- Subsidiaries: Foodland d.o.o.
- Website: www.stark.rs

Štark (pronounced: Shtark; full legal name: Soko Štark d.o.o. Beograd) is a food manufacturing company based in Belgrade, Serbia. The main products of the company include candies, biscuits and chocolates. One of its hallmark products is Najlepše Želje a chocolate bar that means "Best Wishes" in Serbian.

== History ==
The factory dates back to 1922 when a French soldier founded it under the name "Louit" after returning from the Thessaloniki front in World War I. He later changed it to La Cigogna. The firm grew over time into a large factory. It witnessed many political upheavals, starting as a privately owned enterprise and finally being nationalized by the state. It was joined with other smaller companies, creating one large food company in 1966 and changing the name to "Soko Štark". While it was in socialist Yugoslavia, the company was managed by the worker's organization, with workers themselves having a say in the way the company was run.

In 2001, the company changed its business type to joint-stock company and entered the public stock market, under name "Soko-Nada Štark", or shortened "Štark". In 2005, Štark was sold to Serbian company "Grand Prom".

In 2008, the Slovenian food company Droga Kolinska became majority owner of "Grand Prom". In 2010, Croatian consumer goods company Atlantic Grupa bought Slovenian food company Droga Kolinska, thus way gaining ownership over Štark. Štark products are imported into the United States by A.B Company, Inc.

== Product lines ==
Štark's product line includes:

- Assorted chocolates, in bars and in boxes
- Najlepše želje, the company's hallmark chocolate that comes in many flavors (plain milk chocolate, hazelnut creme filled chocolate, raisin filled chocolate, strawberry-yogurt creme filled chocolate, dark chocolate with mint cream), etc. and in various sizes (50 g, 100 g, 200 g, 300 g)
- Lady fingers
- Biscuit and Tea cookies
- Turkish delights
- Chocolate Cream Bananas (not actually bananas, but a foamy dessert covered with chocolate creme in the shape of a banana)
- Jelly beans
- Salty products (most notably Smoki and Prima salty bread sticks)
- Chocolate and/or Hazelnut filled wafers (most notably Napolitanke)

== Miscellaneous ==
- According to Štark, 23 million Prima salty sticks are produced annually, with 45 sticks on average per bag. Each stick is approximately 12 cm long.
- According to Štark, Chocolate Cream Bananas are their best-selling product, and on average, 66 million are sold annually.

== Sponsorships ==
In 2017, Štark signed a naming sponsorship contract with Belgrade Arena to bear its name for five years.
