= Osem (company) =

Israeli company

Osem Investments Ltd.
- Type: Subsidiary
- Industry: Food processing
- Founded: 1942; 84 years ago
- Headquarters: Shoham, Israel
- Area served: Worldwide
- Key people: Aviezer Kaplan, Avi Ben Assayag (CEO)
- Products: Coffee, pasta, breakfast cereals, confectionery
- Brands: Bamba; Gratify; Tivall; Bissli
- Revenue: ▲NIS 3,807.2 million (2010)
- Operating income: NIS 480.5 million (2010)
- Net income: NIS 316.48 million (2010)
- Total assets: NIS 3,551.8 million (2010)
- Total equity: NIS 3,500 million (2010)
- Number of employees: 4707 (2010)
- Parent: Nestlé
- Website: www.osem-nestleusa.com

Osem Investments Ltd. (Hebrew: אֹסֶם השקעות בע"מ) is one of the largest food manufacturers and distributors in Israel. Since 2016 the group has been 100% owned by Nestlé S.A. of Switzerland.

Before it was acquired by Nestlé, the company was publicly traded and listed on the Tel Aviv Stock Exchange. It was a constituent of the TA-35 Index.

== History ==
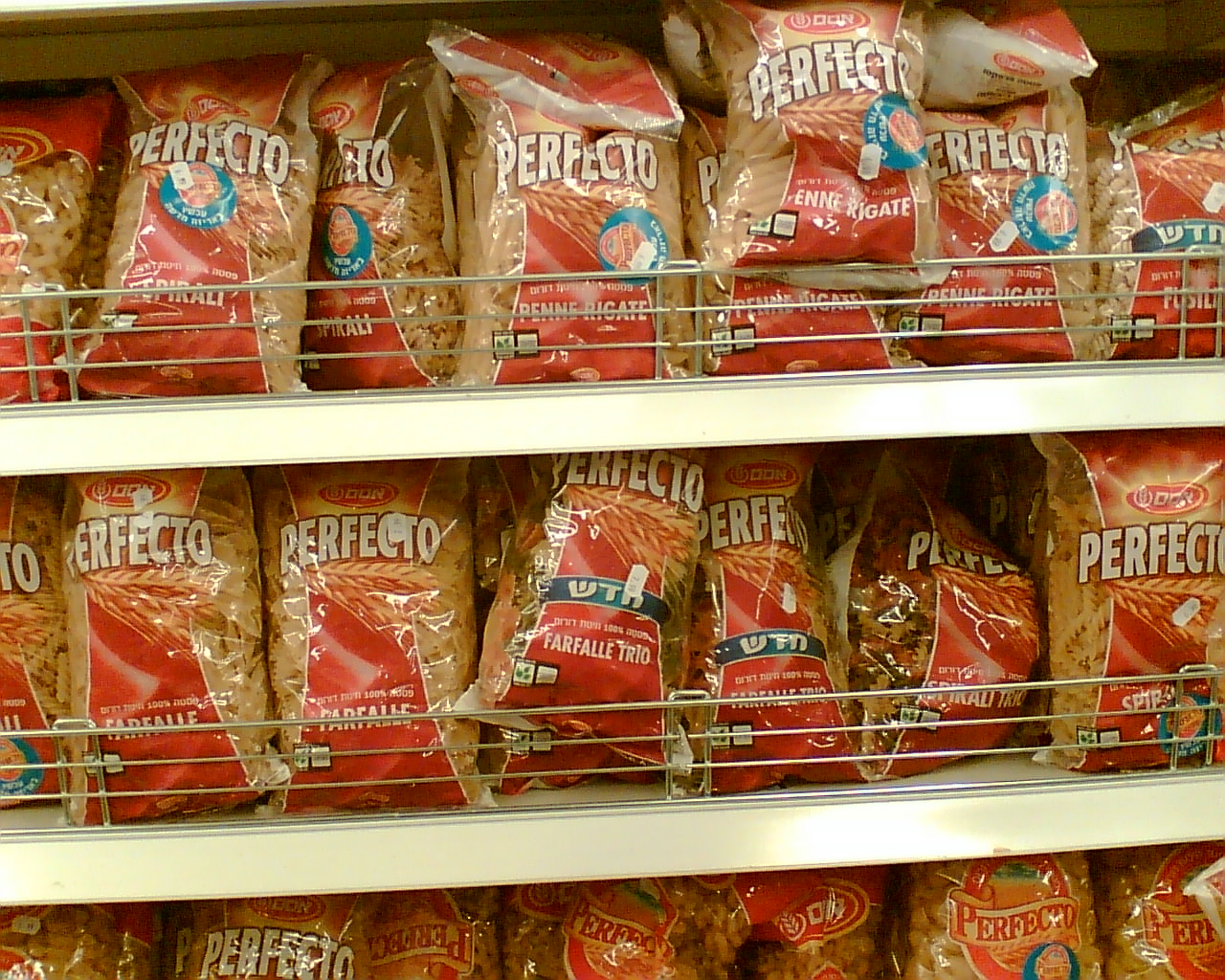
Pasta produced by Osem

In 1942, Eugen Propper and his partner merged Hadagan with two other factories, Assisit and Itrit, to create Osem. The name's origin is in the prayer of the High Priest on Yom Kippur at the time of the Temple in Jerusalem on leaving the Holy of Holies.

In 1946, the company built its first factory in Bnei Brak, producing noodles. Seven years later, in 1953, upon a request by Israel's first prime minister, David Ben-Gurion, the company added its staple "rice-substitute" product ptitim. In 1964, Osem's snack factory was founded in Holon, and the company's main product was created - the peanut butter-flavoured Bamba. In 1970, the company started producing baked food in addition to introducing the Bissli snacks, which come in several flavours such as falafel, mesquite, BBQ, pizza, and onion. Osem also produces soup powders and markets MSG-free versions of its soup mixes under a green label as opposed to the traditional red one.

The company's main factory was built in 1976 in Petah Tikva, in which the company's administration offices, distribution centre, and the sauce factory are now found.

Osem has acquired several smaller food companies and expanded their product lines, such as Froumine, Argal Bakery Shop, and Magdanot HaBait factory (where the cakes production line is found).

Other products manufactured by Osem are Cheerios breakfast cereal and hummus.

== Production facilities and subsidiaries ==
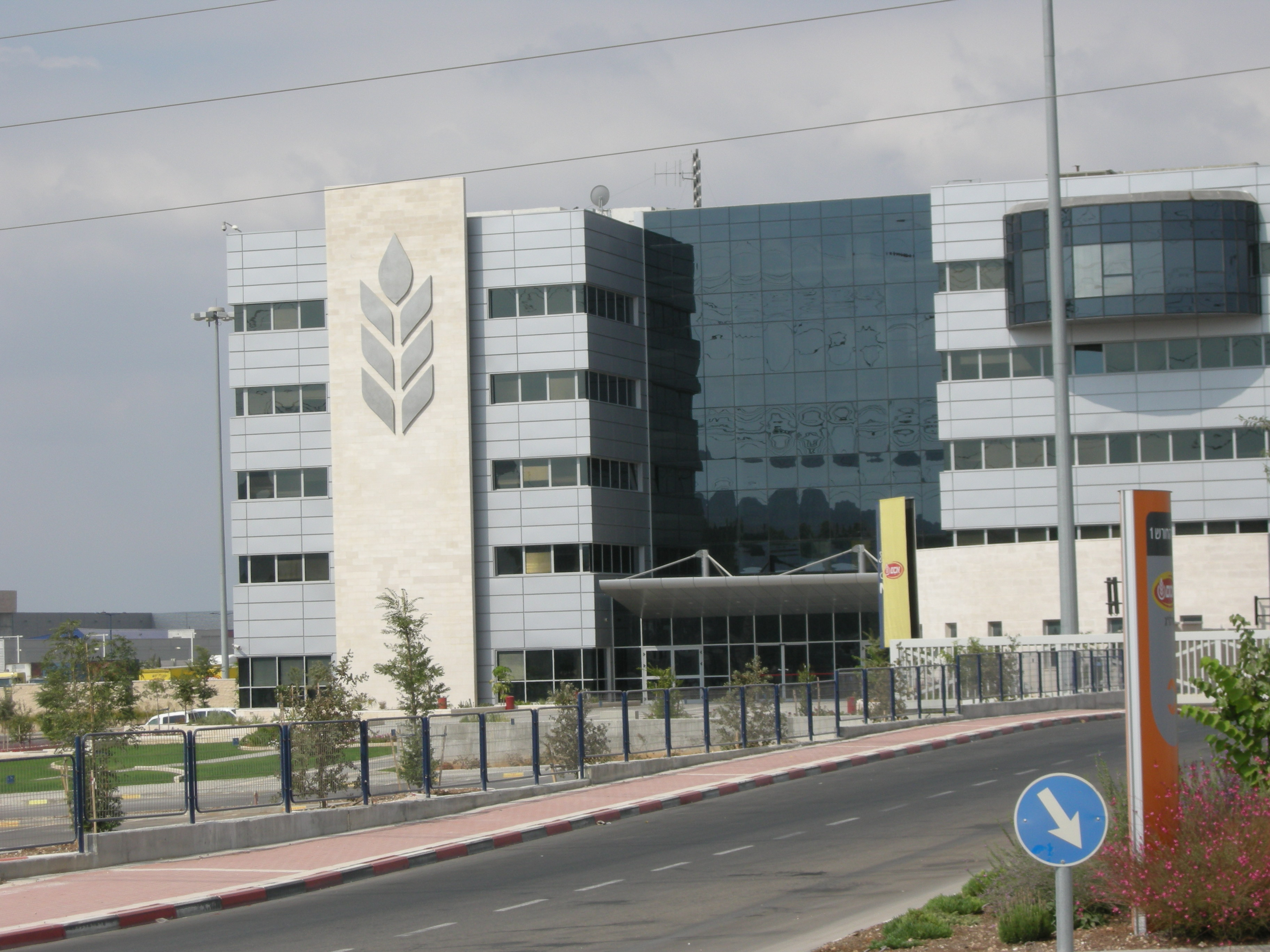
Osem factory, Modi'in

The company, formerly known as Osem Ltd, holds a number of subsidiaries which make up the Osem Group. The company's subsidiaries include Sabra Salads, Tivall, Of Tov, Nestlé Ice Creams, Beit Hashita, Asamim, Nestlé-Purina, Materna Ltd. (51%), and Foodtec. In 2008, the company bought Tribe Mediterranean Foods Ltd., a Mediterranean food producer and distributor based in the United States. The group produces approximately 2,000 different products, divided into four main categories: room temperature food - snacks and pastries, room temperature food - other, chilled food, and frozen food.

The group operates 10 different production facilities in Israel, and distributes its produce through its distribution centers. In 2007, the group completed the construction of a nationwide distribution and logistics center. In addition, the group exports its produce to Europe and the United States through its overseas subsidiaries: Osem U.K. Ltd. and Osem USA Inc.
