= Rafi Yoeli =

- רפי יואלי
- Born: Tel Aviv, Israel
- Citizenship: Israel
- Education: Ph.D., Technion – Israel Institute of Technology
- Occupations: Pilot, inventor, designer, CEO
- Employer(s): Israeli Air Force; Aerospace Industries Ltd. Boeing, Seattle
- Organization(s): Aero Design & Development Ltd. Urban Aeronautics
- Known for: Urban Aeronautics X-Hawk; Tactical Robotics Cormorant
- Title: CEO
- Website: www.urbanaero.com

Rafi Yoeli (Hebrew: רפי יואלי) is an Israeli pilot, inventor, designer of two proposed flying cars (Urban Aeronautics X-Hawk, Tactical Robotics Cormorant), and CEO of Urban Aeronautics Ltd., which he founded in Yavne, Israel in 2000.

== Early life and education ==
Yoeli was born in Tel Aviv, circa 1950, and later served as a reserve officer in the Israeli Air Force. He attended Technion – Israel Institute of Technology.

== Career ==
Following his Israeli Air Force service, Yoeli joined Israel Aerospace Industries Ltd., then was with Boeing in Seattle for 18 months. In 1989, Yoeli founded Aero Design & Development Ltd (AD&D, Ltd.), acting as managing director. In 2001, he started his own company in Israel, Urban Aeronautics, to develop "robots and flying machines."

During the 2000s and 2010s, Yoeli designed and tested the Tactical Robotics Cormorant, formerly AirMule or Mule, a flying car unmanned aerial vehicle (UAV), built by Tactical Robotics Ltd., another subsidiary of Urban Aeronautics Ltd.

=== Designer ===
Yoeli envisioned a hovering vehicle similar to helicopters, but with rotors below the cockpit and passenger seating above it. He developed a plan for a flying rescue vehicle that, while still able to hover, would not have the restrictions that helicopters have, due to rotors, enabling his flying car to work in crowded terrains as in a city or urban area, where rescue would normally be much harder or impossible. Though initially designing a flying car modeled after a sports car; Yoeli realized that a car modeled after a rescue vehicle would sell more successfully. Urban Aeronautics Ltd. was founded to officially develop the concept of the Urban Aeronautics X-Hawk.

In an interview with Swedish newspaper Aftonbladet; Yoeli stated that his flying car, the X-Hawk, would be developed for both military and civilian personal use. The flying car was scheduled to be available to consumers in 2020, at a cost of about $3.2 million USD.
