= Tactical Robotics Cormorant =

Cormorant
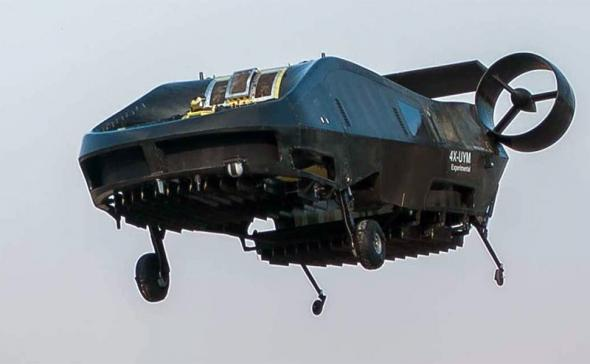

General information
- Type: Flying car
- Manufacturer: Tactical Robotics LTD
- Designer: Rafi Yoeli
- Status: In development
- Primary user: Israel Defense Forces
- Number built: 2 prototypes

History
- Introduction date: Before 2020
- First flight: January 2009; 17 years ago

The Tactical Robotics Cormorant, formerly AirMule or Mule, Israel Defense Forces (IDF) codename Pereira (shapiyriyt; שפירית Shafririt: Dragonfly), is a flying car unmanned aerial vehicle (UAV) built by Tactical Robotics Ltd., a subsidiary of designer Rafi Yoeli's Urban Aeronautics Ltd., in Yavne, Israel. It will be used in search and rescue operations where it is too dangerous or inaccessible for a helicopter, such as evacuating people from the upper stories of burning buildings, or delivering and extracting police and soldiers while very close to structures, narrow streets, or through holes into confined spaces.

== Background ==
After the 2006 Lebanon War, the IDF realized that it needed a special vehicle that could fly unmanned behind enemy lines to rescue its wounded. While a helicopter is the best evacuation vehicle as of 2020, it requires an area clear of trees or electricity columns to land without obstructing the rotor. Chances of it safely leaving a fire-heavy zone are small as it attracts many sorts of weapons fire. The advantages of a ducted fan propelled unmanned air vehicle are that it could offer the same abilities as helicopters, but with fewer, less serious operating limits. It could navigate in and out of creeks, city streets, next to big buildings, compact alleyways, and refugee camp warrens, while shielded rotor blades make it tougher than a regular helicopter. Unmanned vehicles can enter situations too risky for manned helicopters. Cormorant could deliver supplies or cargo, evacuate up to two casualties from a battlefield and transfer them to a field deployed hospital for medical treatment. Some missions may need to be conducted up to hundreds of kilometers from forward operating bases (FOB) and medical care facilities with the only medical support available on scene being unit medics or fellow soldiers. War reports have shown that during combat, moving an injured person only a few hundred yards can take an hour or more.

As of 2012 and into 2014, according to NATO STO TR-HFM-184 report, the AirMule remains the only available design that meets NATO and IDF requirement for an unmanned medical evacuation (MEDEVAC) and casualty evacuation (CASEVAC) vehicle.

Urban Aeronautics Ltd., has patented its design as Fancraft. The Fancraft technologies are supported by 37 registered (granted) patents, and 12 more are in process.

Tactical Robotics Ltd. (TRL), as a subsidiary of Urban Aeronautics Ltd., has an exclusive license for use predominantly in the unmanned military and homeland security markets. TRL has taken the lead in developing the Cormorant. Metro Skyways Ltd. (MSL), as a subsidiary of Urban Aeronautics Ltd., has an exclusive license for use predominantly in the manned civil Air-Taxi and Air-Rescue and MedEvac markets. MSL has taken the lead in developing the X-Hawk.

On May 29, 2018, the Cormorant completed its first live demonstration.

== Development ==
In 2004, the X-Hawk LE concept was published by Urban Aeronautics.

In June 2008, a scaled-down technology demonstrator Panda flew for the first time. It was built to demonstrate its new flight control system and to attract partners.

Elbit Systems, Israel Aerospace Industries and Urban Aeronautics joined in the X-Hawk project headed by the non-profit Aerospace Medicine Research Center (Fisher institute for air and space strategic studies).

The initial idea for the UAV were civilian in nature, but after the publication of plans to equip the US marines with UAVs able to transport humans, it was decided to concentrate on military uses. In 2008, Urban Aeronautics released its initial concept art. On January 7, 2009, a cargo variant that can fly at speeds of 370–463 km/h (200–250 kn) began wind tunnel testing. In 2009, the Mule model was shown at the Israeli pavilion at the 48th Paris Air Show. Its maiden flight was scheduled for April 2009, but was postponed. In June 2009, the UAV was shipped to a flight-testing facility located in central Israel where its Turbomeca Arriel 1D1 engine performed a series of ground tests for hover testing.

=== Phase 1: hover control system ===
Around January 12, 2010, the renamed AirMule had its (tethered) maiden flight, reaching an altitude of only 2 feet. In 30 tethered tests of 1 min duration, it completed the first phase of testing and it demonstrated the fly-by-wire control system's ability to stabilize the vehicle in all three axes using inertial measurements augmented by Global Positioning System (GPS) and two laser altimeters. The next phase of flight testing planned for March was moved back. On April 21, 2010, it achieved sustained tethered automatic hovering flight at an altitude of up to 9.8 ft (3m), which paved the way for the first untethered flight later that year. After 40 test hovers and 10 hours of flight time, the AirMule underwent systems upgrades. By October 5, 2010, the AirMule's skid were replaced by a wheeled landing gear to facilitate ground manoeuvring and to enable short take-off (STOL) and vertical landing operations (VTOL). First considerations were given to countermeasures.

=== Phase 2: free hover and low-speed flight manoeuvres ===
Flight testing resumed until January 2011, when the AirMule underwent system and structural upgrades which were completed by May 9, 2011. It was fitted with an expanded suite of sensors, and a new energy-absorbing wheeled landing gear. The aerodynamics of the lower fuselage was improved for better control responses in gusty wind conditions. On June 30, 2011, it was revealed that a variant the AirMule will be equipped with a remotely operated robotic arm to undertake tasks that pose a danger to humans. This was in response to requests by operators of power line maintenance, and by agencies responsible for the safety of nuclear reactors. By August 2011, the AirMule had accumulated about 40 flying hours. The Defense Ministry is financing half the operational technologies. In September 2011, the IDF had identified an operational requirement for an unmanned VTOL platform to be used to perform resupply and medical evacuation tasks from the front line. The IDF began to allocate a budget for the requirement in the long term acquisition plan. The defence ministry will participate in the funding. Around October 31, 2011, building of a second AirMule prototype began. It will receive a double redundant hydraulic system and stealth technology features.

=== Phase 3: full flight envelope testing ===
On April 23, 2012, it was revealed that a Controp D-Stamp stabilized electro-optical airborne sensor was installed on the first prototype.

On January 21, 2013, it was revealed that the first prototype will receive new propeller blades for the new six-bladed rotors. These will replace the four-bladed rotors that have been used since the start of 2010. The change will increase payload capacity by about 200 kilograms (440 lb). The blades comply with the loads specified for the US Federal Aviation Administration's FAR 35 standard for propellers. The first test flight was scheduled for mid-February.

On February 26, 2013, plans for a high-speed AirMule version was revealed to be the formerly tested cargo variant. It will be used for tactical resupply missions.

On February 25, 2014, it was announced that Green Hills Software real-time operating system (RTOS) had been chosen by Urban Aeronautics.

== Design ==
The design, Fancraft, was inspired by the Piasecki VZ-8 Airgeep's revolutionary design with two tandem ducted fans. However, the similarities end there. Forward thrust is provided mainly by two ducted fan thrusters located at the sides of the aft section. The lift fan and thrusters are powered by a single turboshaft turbine through three proprietary gearboxes and shafts. The early prototype was powered by a Turbomeca Arriel 1D1 which was later replaced a Turbomeca Arriel 2. Originally the prototype lift fans had four-blade rotors, but the final fans have six-blade rotors which are staggered for a speed variant.

The fuselage is constructed from carbon (fiber)-composite. Two 770 liters air-conditioned cells on its sides are designed to receive stretchers and casualties. The cells will also have devices for transfusions during flight. Initial interior cabin noise was measured in hover at 95 decibels without any incorporated acoustic treatment or liners. An additional 1,100 liters are available in an optional belly mounted compartment. The fuselage forms an airfoil and generates over 50% of lift at high speed (US Patent # 7,806,362B2). An aerodynamic bulge between the ducted fans keeps the airflow attached to it via Coandă effect and Bernoulli's principle, hence generating lift, while diverting the airflow into the aft fan for increased thrust.

For military uses, the Cormorant can be equipped with flare and chaff countermeasures. Since the second prototype, the Cormorant has improved stealth. The fuselage structure and design of the engine's exhaust pipe reduce its noise, heat, and radar signatures, including an appropriate flight profile. Early tests without stealth measured 87 decibels during hover at a distance of 125 feet. The Trophy system was considered for inclusion.

=== Flight stability, forward speed, and safety ===
For increasing or decreasing overall lift, the angle of attack for all blades is collectively altered by equal amounts at the same time resulting in ascents, or descents. The Fancraft technology on the Cormorant employs a Vane Control System (VCS), US Patents #6,464,166 and 6,817,570, consisting of 200 vanes at the inlet and outlet ducts that can be deflected simultaneously (top and bottom) or differentially to generate side force or a rolling movement. Front and rear ducts are deflected differentially for yaw. The VCS generates six degrees of freedom independent of one another. The VCS is powered by a dual redundant hydraulic system which will allow for uninterrupted rotor pitch control in the event of a failure to one of the pressure supply lines. The VCS is engaged in excess of 100 per second. The early VCS was generating more than 2.0 radians/sec² of roll acceleration for roll and yaw control. It was planned to double roll acceleration with planned improvements, enabling precise hovering in gusty wind conditions with wind speeds of up to 50 kn (92.5 km/h).

A set of louvers at the front of the forward duct and rear of the aft duct that open during forward flight to allow the incoming flow to move through the duct and thereby greatly reduce drag to enable forward speeds of 100–120 knots in contrast to a top speed of typically 40 knots in a conventional ducted-fan design (US Patent # 7,806,362B2).

Due to the absence of a rotor, hence autorotation, Fancraft will be equipped with a ballistically deployed parachute to be used in cases of catastrophic engine failure.

=== Sensors and radars ===
The AirMule is equipped with GPS for translational position and velocity readings, two laser altimeters to indicate the vehicle's height above ground which will be augmented by a doppler radar altimeter for dusty conditions.

A Controp D-Stamp stabilized electro-optical sensor, provided as part of the auto-land system, will enable the aircraft to guide itself to land over any high contrast marker (flare, flag, a red cloth) in a combat zone. If a landing site cannot be highlighted by placing a physical marker, a laser spot from an airborne designator can be used.

=== Avionics ===
The flight-control system is a four-channel redundant fly-by-wire system that relies almost entirely on inertial navigation system measurements augmented by GPS signals.

The Cormorant uses the Integrity real-time operating system (RTOS) and Multi integrated development environment (IDE) for custom programming.

=== Ground control, telemetry and navigation ===
Sensors and other subsystems use three datalinks providing 460 channels of real-time telemetry.

The retrieved and transferred data will be stored at a ground control unit (GCU), which will be equipped with an air data computer for displaying its position. The GCU will monitor telemetry data supplied by the UAV using uplink and downlink communication devices. Pilots will use a fly-by-wire flight control system, and an automatic stabilization feature to help control the aircraft and maintain level flight. The Cormorant can land safely despite communication errors in the GCS.

== Certification ==
Certification by the United States Federal Aviation Administration (FAA) has been a prime consideration in every aspect of Fancraft. They are being designed to comply with the FAA's FAR Part 27 and Part 29 (depending on weight) certification standards, and with the special Powered Lift certification standard that applies to tiltrotor aircraft.

== Scenario ==
One Cormorant can ferry 500 kilograms (1,100 lb) of useful cargo per each 50 kilometres (31 mi) radius sortie, thereby delivering about 6,000 kilograms (13,000 lb) over 24 hours. A 10–12 Cormorant Mobile Supply Unit can deliver supplies, day after day, to sustain 3,000 combatants, while at the same time ferrying back their wounded and casualties.

Equipped with remotely controlled manipulator arms it can be used for inspections, maintenance operations or repairs, flying above dangerous zones such as nuclear reactors and areas contaminated by chemical plant leaks. Examples could include replacing damaged insulators on power lines, pumping heavy water into pools covering uranium rods inside damaged nuclear reactors, fixing leaking pipes or repairing areas under bridges or marine structures that have suffered corrosion damage, and agricultural spraying.

== Variants ==
- High-speed Cormorant for tactical supply mission, staggered-rotors, 250 kn, fuselage design with spoiler to increase use of airflow for more thrust. The variant will be powered by a 1,600 shaft horsepower (1,200 kW) class turbine engine, and is 20% larger and 50% heavier than a standard Cormorant.

== Partners ==
Urban Aeronautics is in contact with the United States Army and the militaries of other nations, including India and Italy, for possible sale of the Cormorant.

- Elbit Systems
- SkySaver
- Israel Aerospace Industries
- Bell Textron

== Specifications ==
Data from

General characteristics

- Capacity: 2 patients
- Length: 20 ft 4 in (6.2 m)
- Width: 11 ft 6 in (3.5 m) , 2.15 m without thrusters
- Height: 7 ft 7 in (2.3 m) , 1.8 m without thrusters
- Empty weight: 1,700 lb (771 kg)
- Max takeoff weight: 3,100 lb (1,406 kg)
- Powerplant: 1 × Turbomeca Ariel 2 turboshaft turbine, 940 shp (701 kW)
  early prototype fuel consumption for 1h mission
  132 kilograms (291 lb) @ 65 knots (120 km/h; 75 mph)
  163 kilograms (359 lb) @ 100 knots (185 km/h; 115 mph)
- Main rotor diameter: 6 × 5 ft 11 in (1.8 m)
- Propellers: 2-bladed

Performance

- Maximum speed: 97 kn (112 mph, 180 km/h) at sea level
- Endurance: up to 5 hours
- Service ceiling: 12,000 ft (3,700 m)
- Rate of climb: 5,980 ft/min (30.4 m/s) early prototype
- Payload: 500 kilograms (1,100 lb) in a typical 1 h mission for a range of 50 km (27 nmi; 31 mi) (20 minutes reserve)
  250 kg for up to 5 h

== See also ==
- Urban Aeronautics X-Hawk, a two-engine model intended to transport five to eight passengers
- Urban Aeronautics Centaur, designed to carry three to five passengers with no pilot
- Aerial Reconfigurable Embedded System

=== Similar cargo role ===
- Northrop Grumman MQ-8 Fire Scout
- Boeing A160 Hummingbird
- Kaman K-MAX
