= Bissli =

Israeli wheat snack

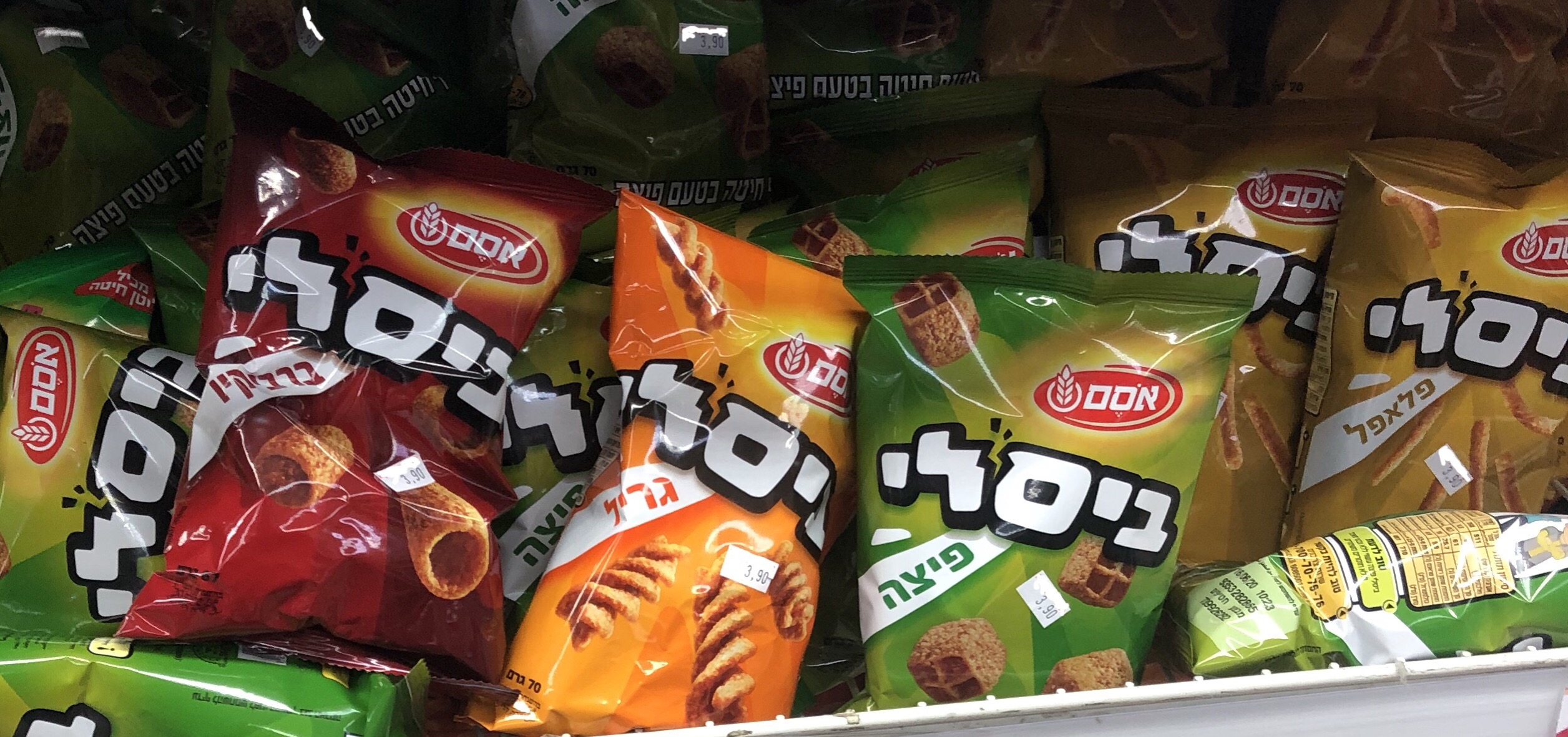
- Product type: Wheat snack
- Current owner: Osem
- Country: Israel
- Related brands: Bamba
- Markets: Kosher foods
- Website: osem.co.il

Bissli (Hebrew: בִּיסְלִי, Bisli) is an Israeli wheat snack produced by Osem. Bissli is Osem's second-best selling snack brand after Bamba.

Bissli is a crunchy snack that is made in the shape of pasta. The name is a combination of the Hebrew words Bis meaning "bite (of food)" and li meaning "for me".

The most popular flavors are "BBQ" and "Smokey". Other flavors include onion, pizza, falafel and Mexican.

Described by the manufacturer as a uniquely Israeli product, Bissli is produced in five factories around Israel. It was first sold in 1975.

In 2014, Osem introduced a special edition of their other popular snack, peanut-flavor Bamba together with Bissli, mixed within the same blue package, named "Bissli-Bamba Mix". Another edition of "Mix" included onion-flavor Bissli, packaged in a green pack.

In 2025, Bissli Twist was introduced in falafel and onion.

== Gallery ==
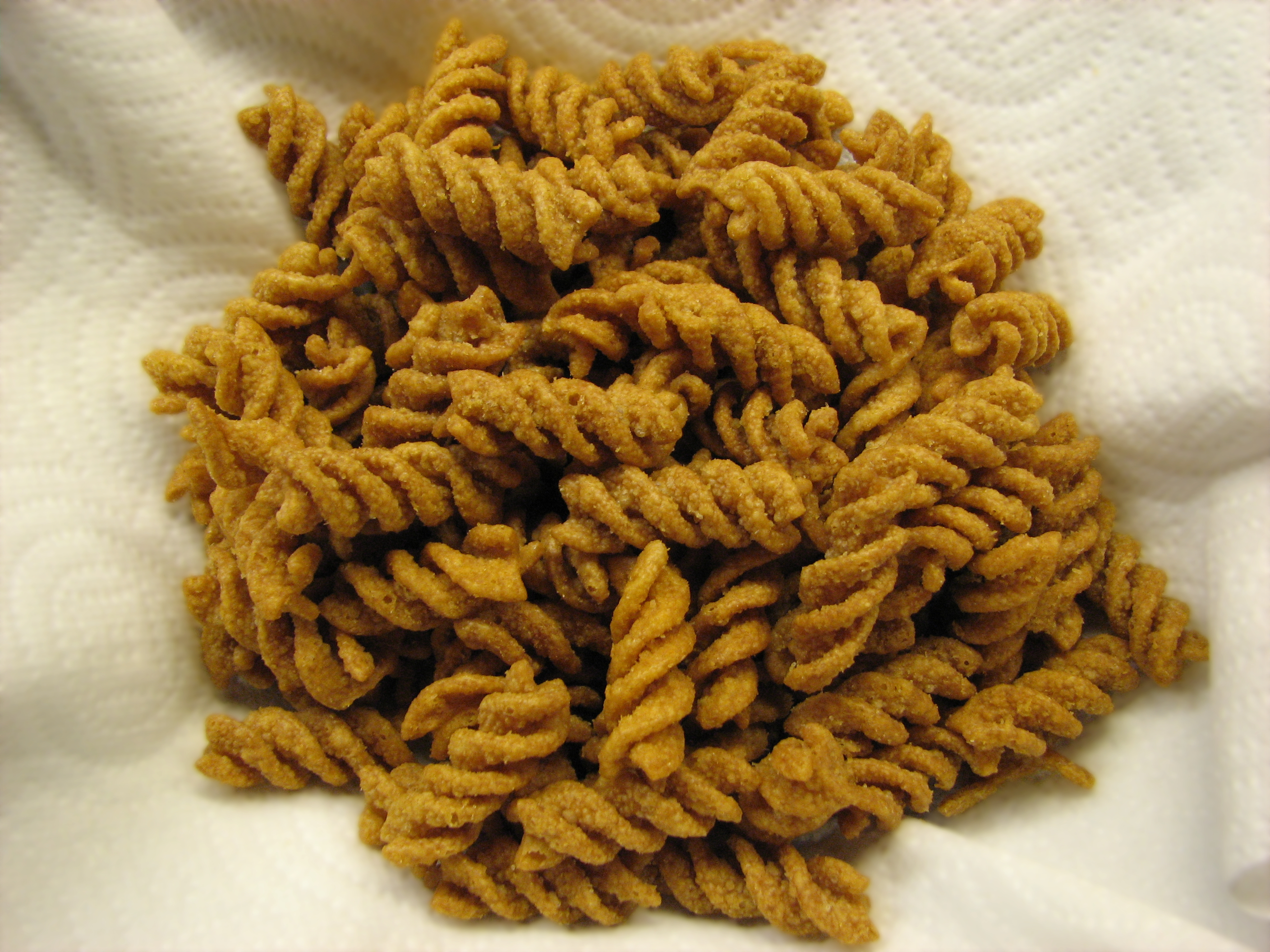
BBQ-flavored Bissli

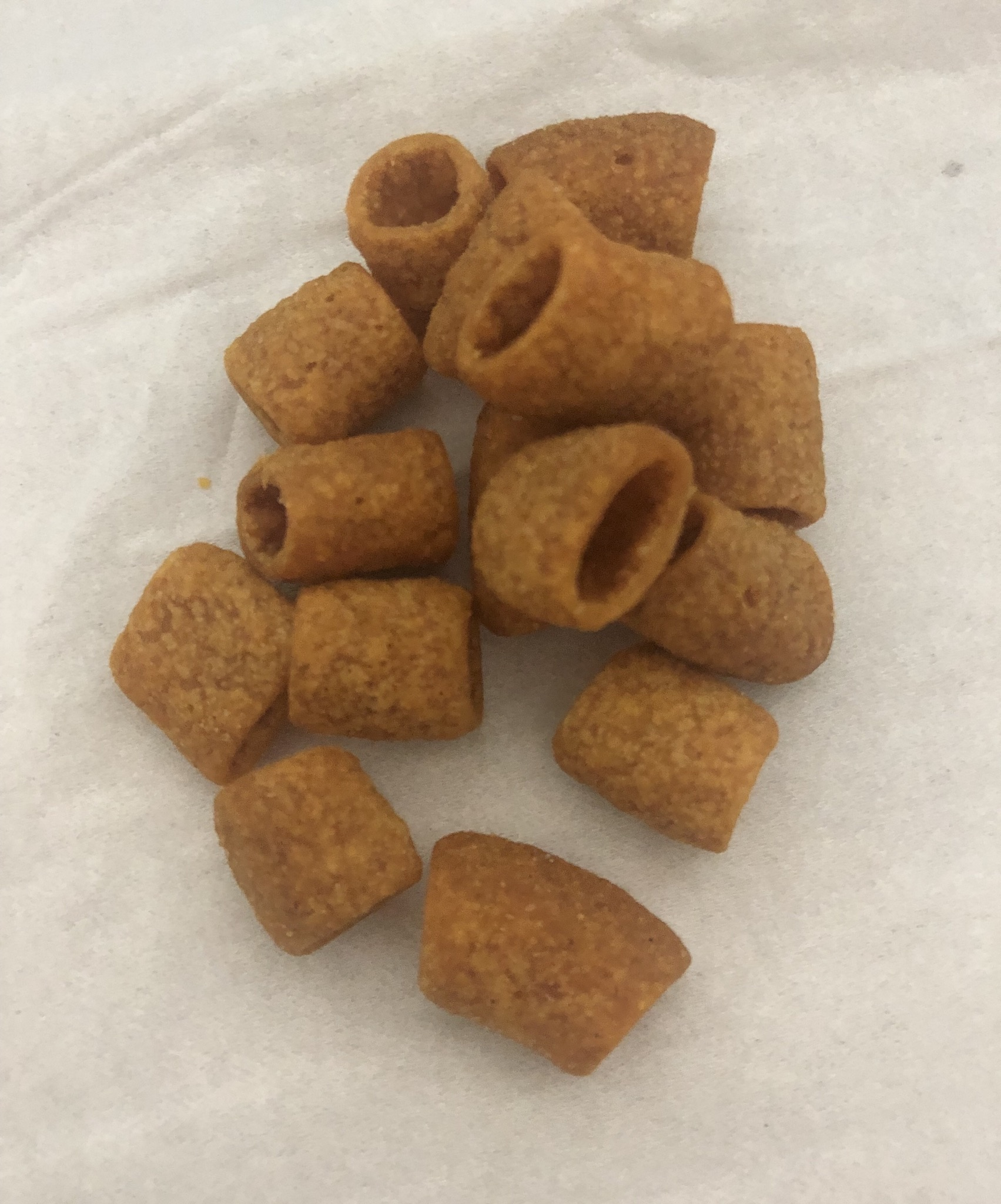
Smokey-flavored Bissli

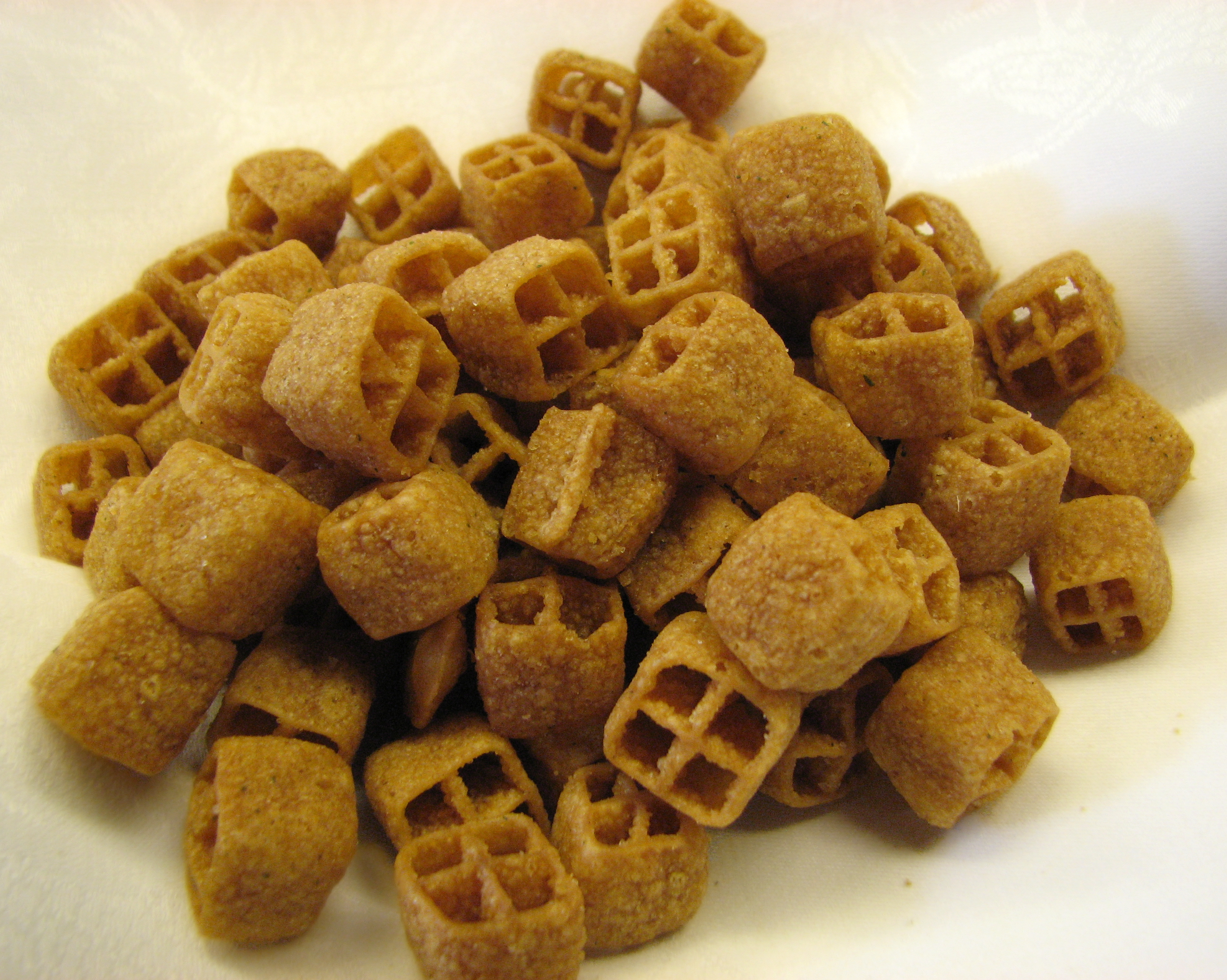
Pizza-flavored Bissli

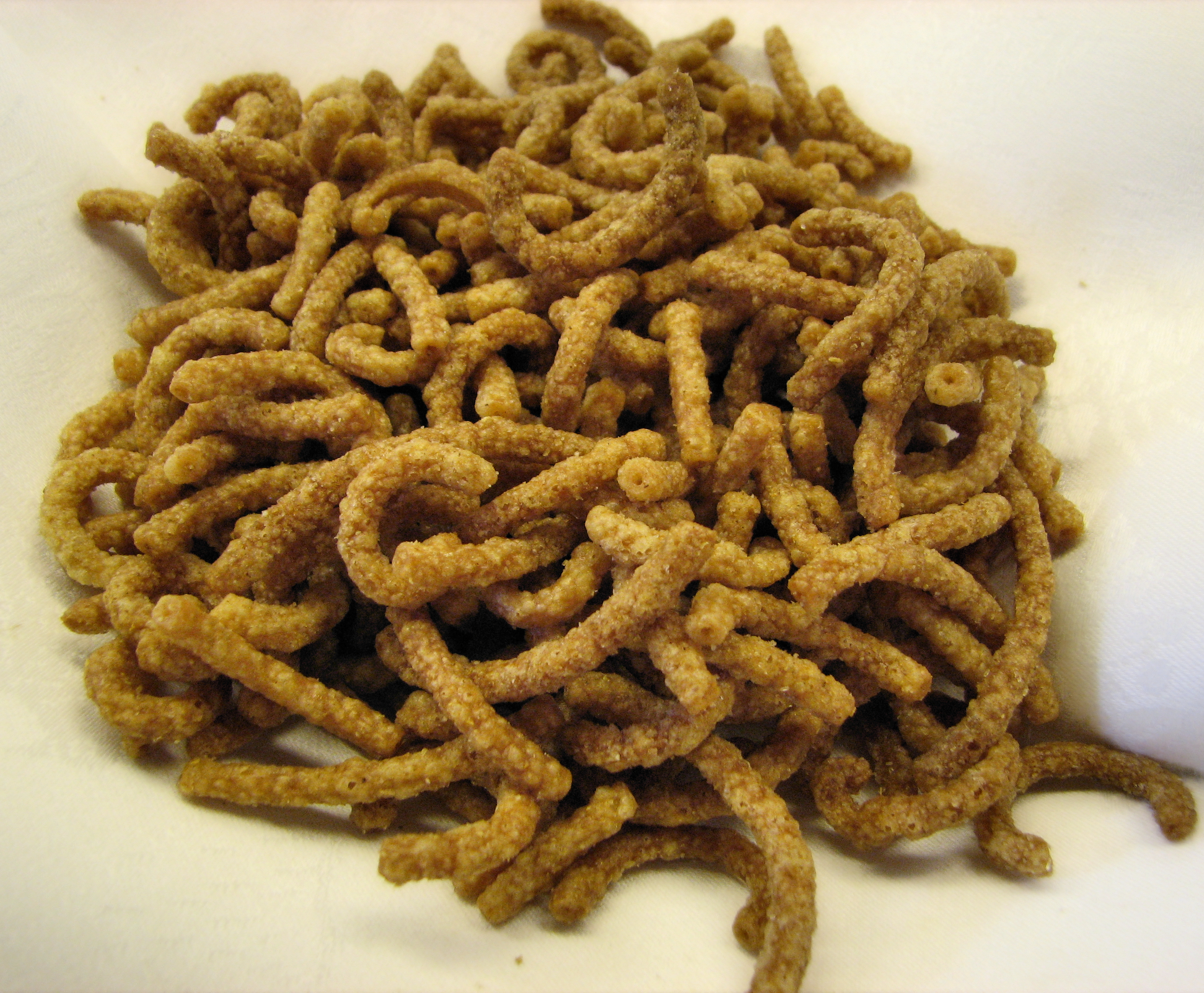
Falafel-flavored Bissli

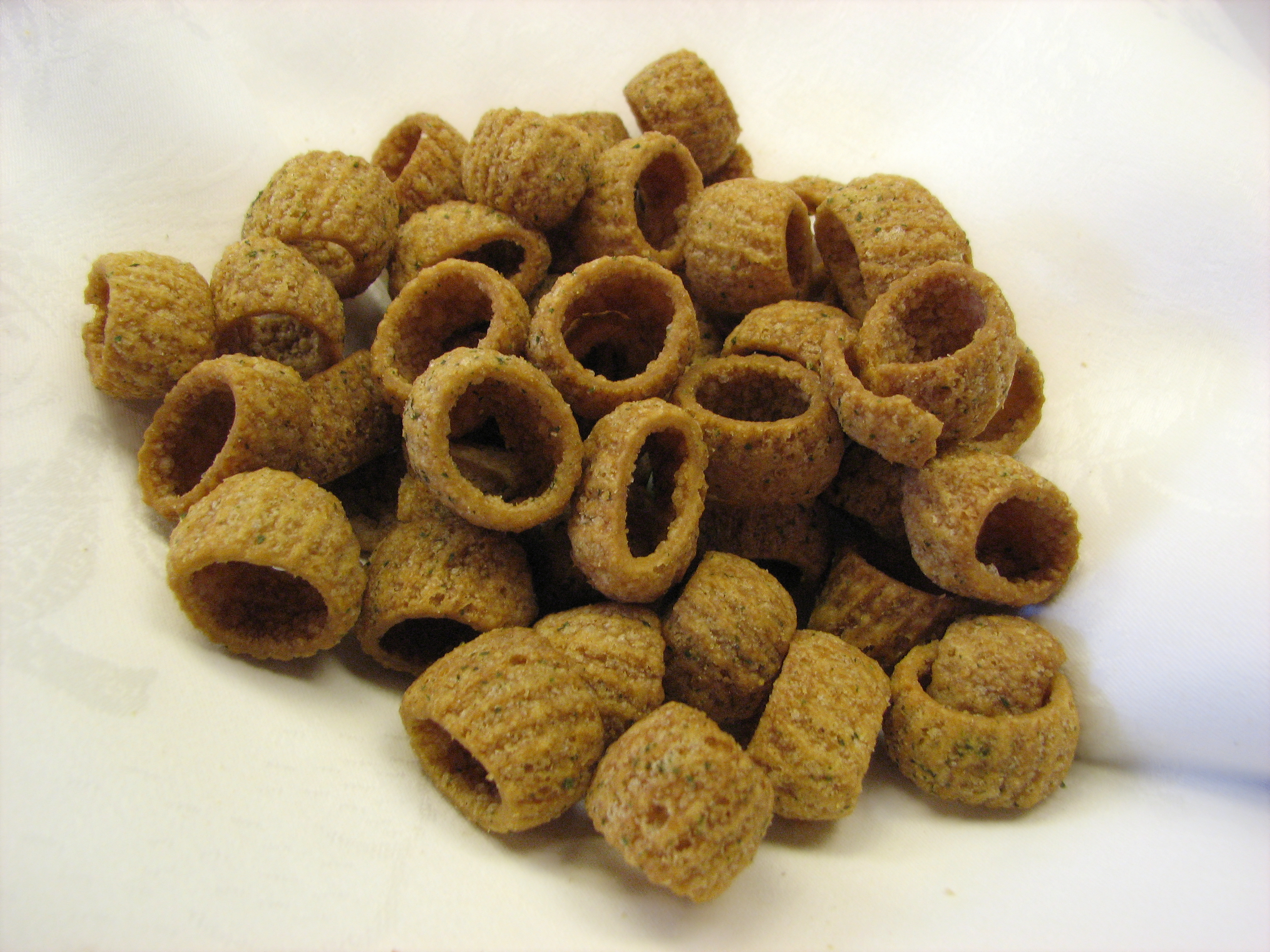
Onion-flavored Bissli

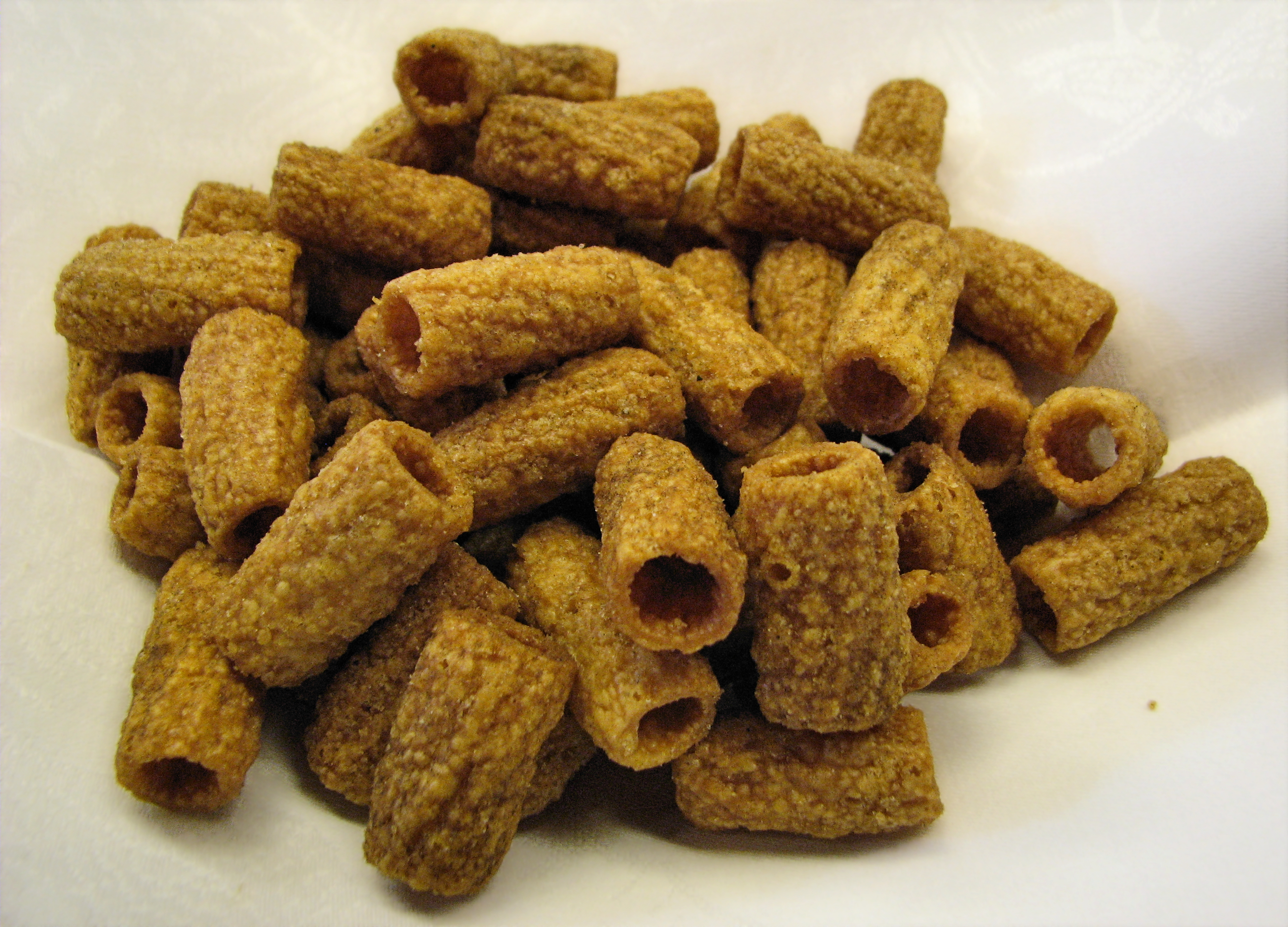
Taco-flavored Bissli

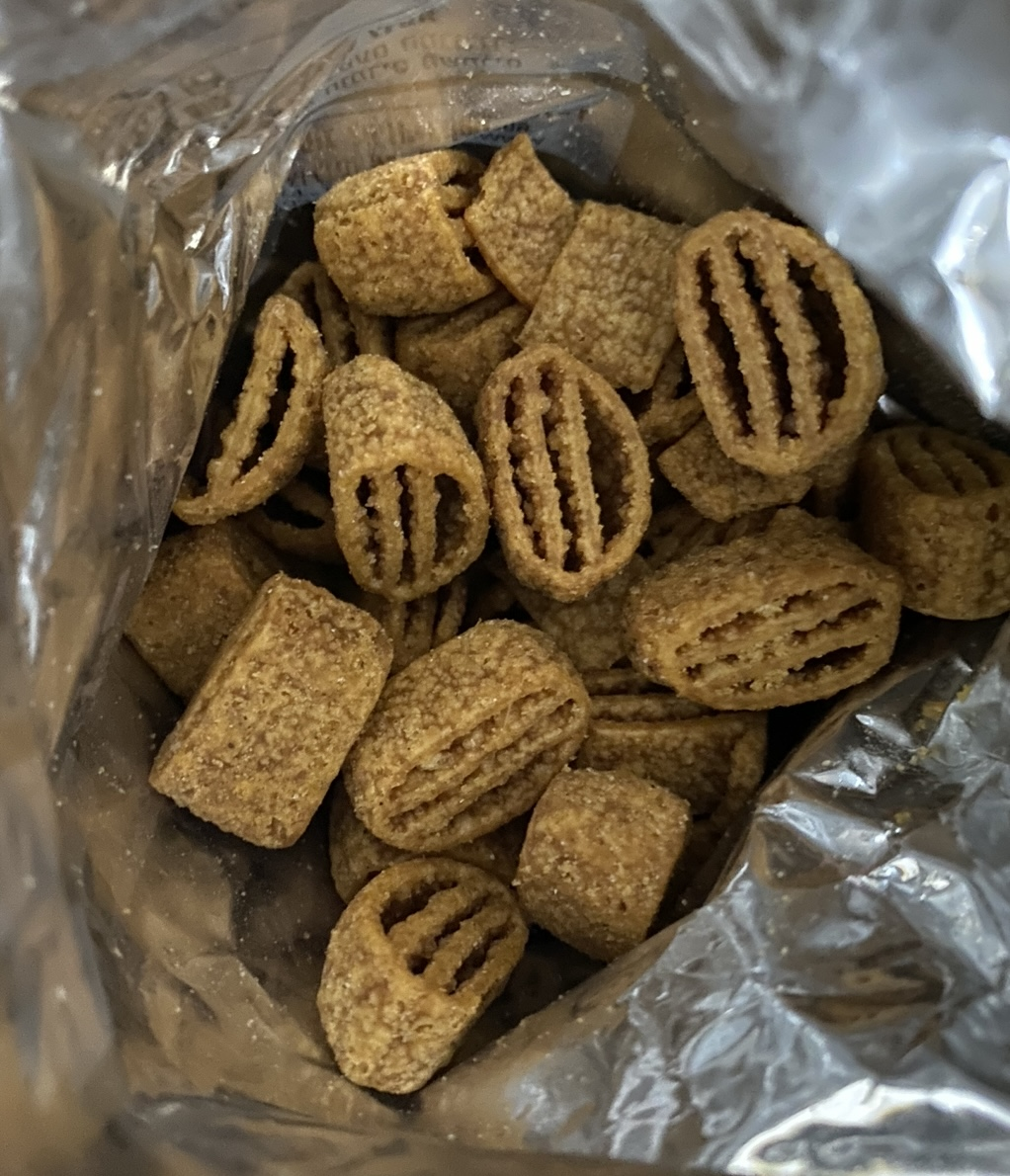
Hamburger-flavored Bissli

== See also ==
- Israeli cuisine
- Snack food
