= Cormorant (disambiguation) =

A cormorant is a family of approximately 40 species of sea bird.

Cormorant may also refer to:

== Aircraft ==
- CH-149 Cormorant, a Canadian Forces helicopter
- Lockheed Martin Cormorant, a cancelled Lockheed Martin project
- Tactical Robotics Cormorant, a flying car unmanned aerial vehicle

== Arts and entertainment ==
- The Cormorant, a 1986 novel by Stephen Gregory, and later film
- The Cormorant, a 2013 novel by Chuck Wendig
- Cormorant (band), a San Francisco Bay Area progressive metal band
- An episode of Screen Two
- A display type family (font)

== Places ==
- Cormorant, Manitoba, Canada
- Cormorant Township, Becker County, Minnesota, US
- Cormorant oilfield, an oilfield in the North Sea

== Ships ==
- HMS Cormorant, several ships of the British Royal Navy
- USS Cormorant, several ships of the United States Navy

== Other uses ==
- Cormorant (horse) (1974–2007), American Thoroughbred racehorse
- Cormorant Network, a British Army Strategic Communications System

== See also ==
- Cormoran, a giant associated with St. Michael's Mount in the folklore of Cornwall
- Kormoran (disambiguation)
  - P677 Cormoran, a Flamant class patrol vessel of the French Navy
  - German auxiliary cruiser Kormoran (1938), a Kriegsmarine commerce raider
