= RDCM =

RDCM may refer to:

- The stock ticker for Radcom Ltd
- Abbreviation for × Rodricidium
