= List of public art in Cleveland =

This is a list of public art in Cleveland, in the United States. This list applies only to works of public art on permanent display in an outdoor public space. For example, this does not include artworks in museums. Public art may include sculptures, statues, monuments, memorials, murals, and mosaics.

Image	Title / subject	Location and coordinates	Date	Artist / designer	Type	Material	Dimensions	Designation	Owner / administrator	Wikidata	Notes
	Free Stamp	Willard Park 41.5055°N 81.6925°W	1991	Claes Oldenburg; Coosje van Bruggen	Sculpture					Q18084727	
More images	Goethe–Schiller Monument	Wade Park	1907	Ernst Friedrich August Rietschel	Statues	Bronze	3.7 m (12 ft)				A reproduction of the original monument in Weimar
More images	Guardians of Traffic	Hope Memorial Bridge 41.489407°N 81.693554°W	1932	Henry Hering; Frank Walker	Statues	Metal				Q117351862	
	Rocky Colavito	Tony Brush Park, Little Italy 41.5085024°N 81.5994576°W	2021	David Deming	Statue	Bronze				Q108607361	
More images	The Thinker	Cleveland Museum of Art	1916	Auguste Rodin	Sculpture	Bronze			Cleveland Museum of Art	Q60759083	Damaged by a bomb in 1970 and displayed outside the museum in its damaged condition.
More images	Thomas Jefferson	Cuyahoga County Courthouse	1911	Karl Bitter	Statue	Bronze				Q20712505	
