= Radwin =

Israeli wireless communications manufacturing company

Radwin Ltd.
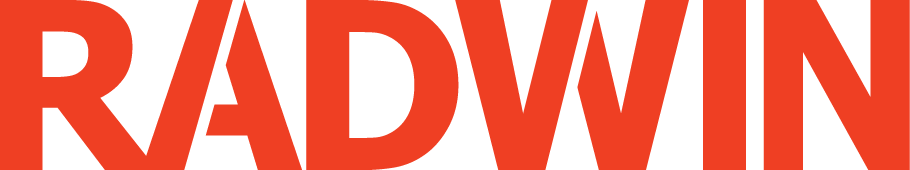
- Type: Private
- Industry: Telecommunications
- Founded: 1997; 29 years ago
- Headquarters: Tel Aviv, Israel
- Area served: World
- Key people: Sharon Sher (CEO)
- Products: PTP: Radwin 2000 PTP, Radwin 2000 Alpha, PtMP: JET Series, NEO Series, Subscriber Units, MultiSector Series, Outland™ Series, TerraWin™ Series; Mobility: FiberinMotion®, Terrabridge, OSS Tools, Beamforming technology
- Number of employees: 250
- Website: www.radwin.com

Radwin is an Israeli wireless communications manufacturing company, a member of the RAD Group of companies.

Radwin produces wireless communications systems used by telecoms carriers, city and town councils, remote communities, ISPs, WISPs, and private networks. It also creates hardware for transportation applications such as metro systems, bus networks, ferries, airports, and vehicles such as patrol vehicles, manned and unmanned heavy machinery used in mines and ports. The hardware is used for applications, including mobile and IP backhaul, home and enterprise wireless broadband access, private network connectivity, and video surveillance transmission. As part of the Smart City initiative in India by Prime Minister Narendra Modi, Radwin entered a partnership with Avaya in 2016.

The company is headquartered in Tel-Aviv, Israel, with regional offices around the world, in Brazil, El Salvador, China, Colombia, Poland, India, Mexico, Peru, Philippines, Singapore, South Africa, Russia, Spain, Thailand, the United Kingdom and United States.

== History ==
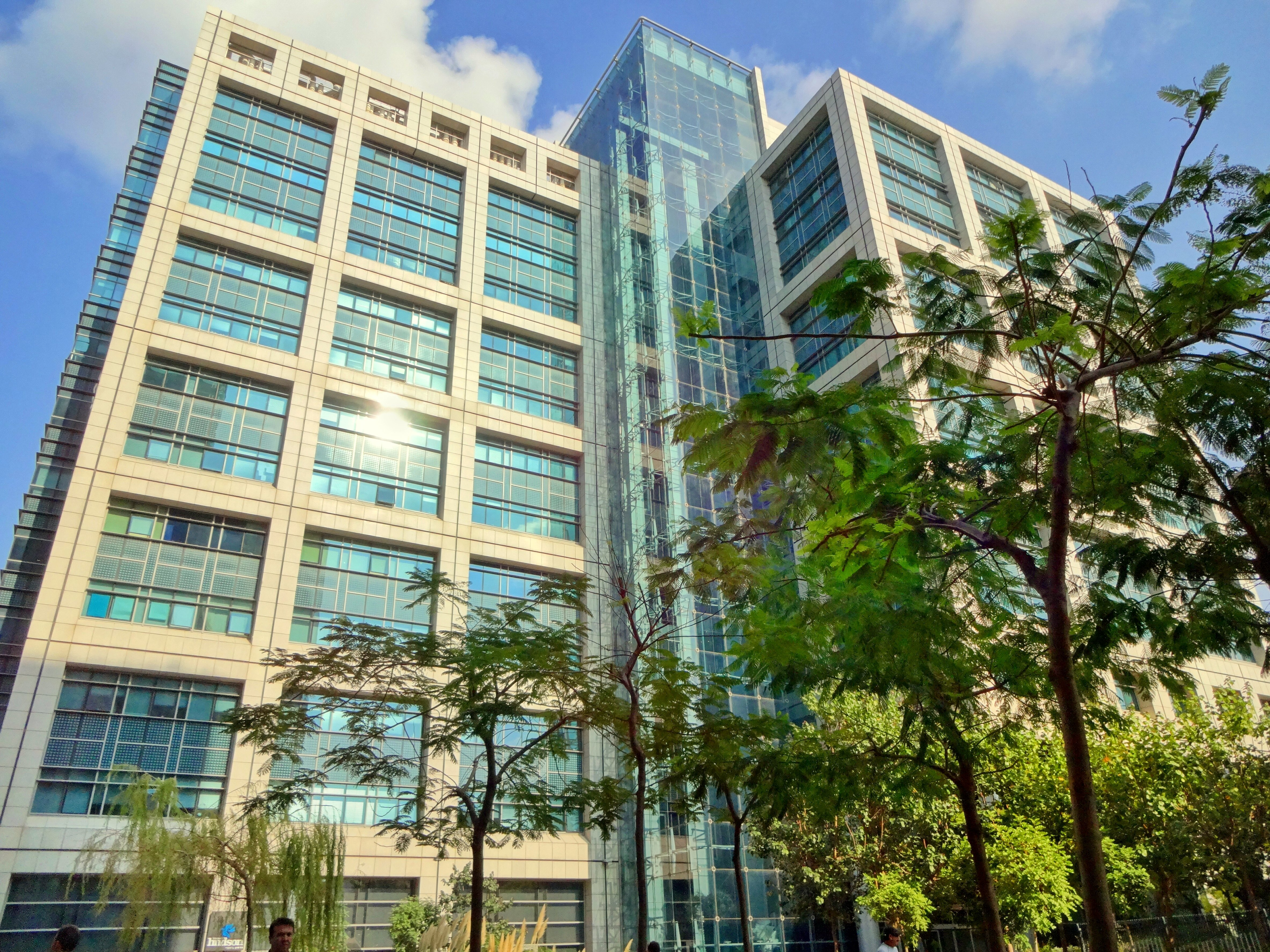
RADWIN headquarters, Ramat HaHayal, Tel Aviv

Radwin was founded in 1997 by Sharon Sher. During his military service obligation, he was assigned to a R&D unit where he worked on projects involving telecommunication systems and wireless communications. After receiving a degree in mathematics and physics from Hebrew University of Jerusalem, and a master's degree in electronic engineering from Tel Aviv University, he founded Radwin in 1997 as a spin-off of RAD Data Communications. The first products were point-to-point radios.

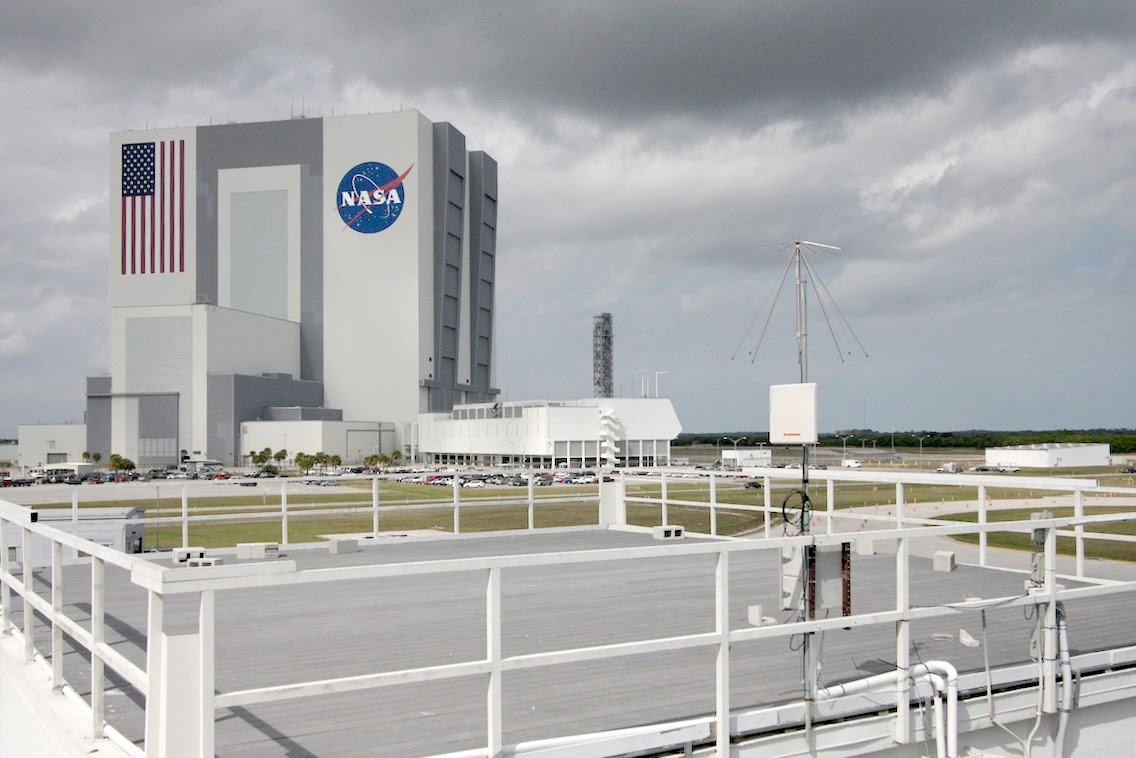
Radwin system in use at Kennedy Space Centre, Florida.

By 2005, the company had sold its first 10,000 radios, and its products were chosen for one of Asia's largest WiFi backhaul projects, with more than one thousand wireless links. Radwin was selected by Indian Railways for train-to-track connectivity, and in the same year, the company opened an office in India.

After the 2004 tsunami, Radwin donated 1,000 wireless broadband units for the reconstruction of Thailand's communications network. They also went on to provide on-site communication systems for rescue teams.

In 2006, the company launched its first point to multipoint products. By 2007 Radwin had sold more than 50,000 units, in over 70 countries, and in 2008, that reached 100,000 units in more than 100 countries.

Radwin was chosen by the UK Ministry of Defence in 2009 to provide a front line digital communications backbone to replace the Cormorant Network in the War in Afghanistan. Systems were fitted to front-line vehicles, providing reliable broadband communication in non-line-of-sight conditions.

In 2010 Radwin was chosen for wireless HD video transmission at NASA launch events taking place at the Kennedy Space Center, Florida.

In 2013, the company's FiberinMotion was selected and deployed on the Moscow Metro, providing in-tunnel train-to-wayside broadband wireless communication, delivering on-board high-speed (90 Mbit/s) internet for passengers, and infrastructure for real-time CCTV transmission, passenger information systems and communications-based train control.

The company launched a beamforming point-to-multipoint system in 2015, Radwin 5000 Jet, designed to deliver high capacity in challenging high-interference environments and use congested spectrum more efficiently than traditional systems. Radwin's wireless mobility solution is selected by Bangkok for Gold Line (a first completely automated, mass rapid transit (MRT) system in Bangkok).

== Awards & notable events ==
- WISP President's Choice Award 2004
- Named one of the Deloitte Technology Fast 50 in 2008, 2009, 2010, and 2011
- Passenger Innovation of the Year 2017, SmartRail Europe Innovation Awards
