= Robert Madge =

Robert Madge may refer to:

- Robert Madge (businessman) (born 1952), British entrepreneur and technologist
- Robert Madge (actor) (born 1996), British stage and television actor
