= Polygon, SPE =

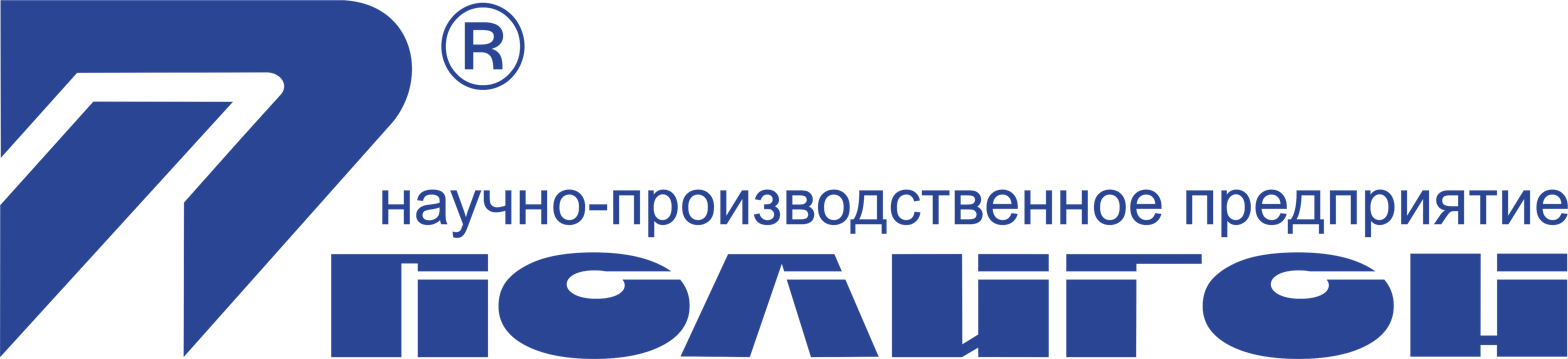
- Company type: JSC
- Industry: Telecommunication
- Founded: 1988
- Headquarters: Ufa, Russia
- Key people: Tagir Yakubov (CEO)
- Products: Multiplexers, Switches, Software, Routers
- Services: Telecommunication services
- Number of employees: 250
- Website: plgn.ru/eng/

Polygon (Russian: НПП "Полигон") is a Russian research and production enterprise engaged in the development, production and servicing of electronic and telecommunications equipment. The company produces switches, routers, converters, gateways for the needs of mobile operators, industrial companies, departmental bodies, public authorities and other customers.

The company is a backbone enterprise in the Republic of Bashkortostan and is actively involved in the import substitution program. Polygon products satisfy the provisions of the decree of the Ministry of Industry and Trade of the Russian Federation No. 1399 from June 3, 2015 "On confirmation of the assignment and telecommunications equipment, produced in the territory of the Russian Federation, the telecommunication equipment of Russian origin status".

== History ==
- 1941 - Organization of the plant "Ufimkabel" on the basis of the evacuated enterprises.
- 1985 - Creation of the Ufa Center of Scientific and Technical Creativity of Youth (STCY).
- 1988 - Creation of Polygon, SPE.
- 1992 - Victory in the tender of BETO corporation to manufacture fiber-optic linear path for the compounds stations MT-20 and its outstations.
- 1996 - The transition to the active use of programmable logic integrated circuits (FPGAs) as the basis of the device architecture.
- 2006 - The development of the first domestic switch.
- 2013 - Expert council of ANO "Agency of strategic projects for the promotion of new initiatives" ASI approved business project "Development of domestic production of telecommunication equipment", initiated by Polygon, SPE.

== Products ==
- Switches and Ethernet equipment
- Industrial switches with IP30 protection level and higher
- FTTx equipment
- TDMoIP gateways
- Optical modems and multiplexers E1 / Ethernet
- Redundancy equipment
- Bridges Ethernet over E1
- Converters RS-232 and RS-485 - Ethernet
- E1 access devices

== Primary activities ==
- Full cycle of development, production and implementation of telecommunications equipment
- Creation of special software
- Marketing and sales
- Customer service and technical support
- Execution of special orders for the development of telecommunications equipment
- Staff training and education

== Directors ==
CEO - Makhov Igor Alekseevich.

== Notes ==
Produced devices are certified in the "System of certification in the field of communication." The quality management system complies with the requirements of GOST RV 0015-002- 2012, ISO 9001: 2008 and Standard ISO 9001-2011. The company is a regular participant in the annual trade fair Interpolitech.
