= Yehuda Zisapel =

Israeli businessman and entrepreneur

- יהודה זיסאפל
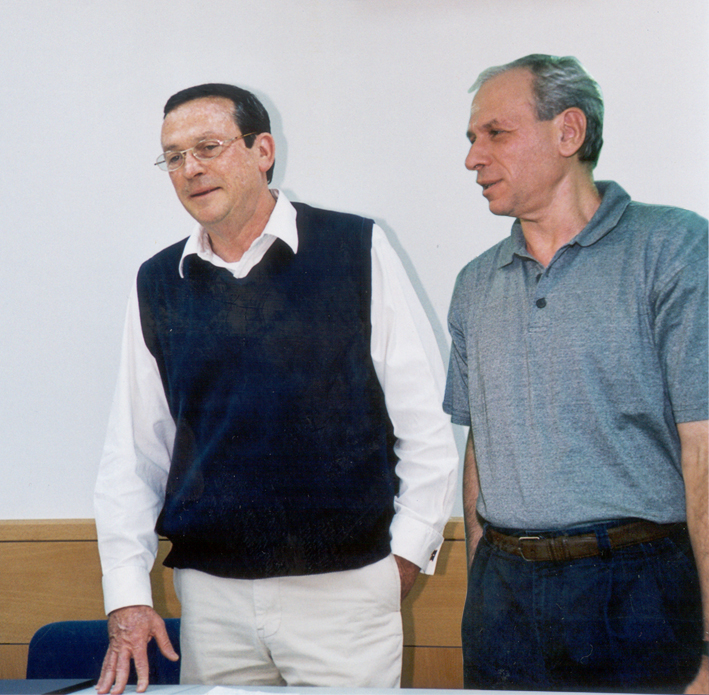
- Yehuda Zisapel (left) and his brother Zohar Zisapel
- Born: April 12, 1942; Tel Aviv, Israel
- Died: March 10, 2024 (aged 81); Tel Aviv, Israel
- Occupation: Entrepreneur

Yehuda Zisapel (Hebrew: יהודה זיסאפל; April 12, 1942 – March 10, 2024) was an Israeli entrepreneur, businessman and philanthrope. He founded the Rad Group of companies with his brother, Zohar Zisapel.

== Biography ==
Yehuda Zisapel was born in Tel Aviv, one of three children of immigrant parents from Poland who owned and ran a shoe store on Herzl Street, then one of the city's main streets. From his youth he played the violin and even kept a collection of antique violins. During his military service, Yehuda began studying electrical engineering at the Technion. He completed his bachelor's and master's degrees in electrical engineering, and a master's degree in business administration at the management faculty of the graduate school, in the Recanati Graduate School of Business Administration, Tel Aviv University.

Zisapel was injured in the Six Day War and at the end of his hospitalization he started working at Motorola Israel and served as the manager of the company's systems engineering department. In 1975 he founded "Bitcom Agencies", a small private company that marketed communications products. Bitcom, which after several years changed its name to "Bynet Communication Computers", represented important international manufacturers and was the first to launch innovative communication technologies in the Israeli market.

At the beginning of 1982, his brother Zohar Zisapel joined him, and together they worked to produce and develop communication products for export. "Rad Communication Computers", the first company they founded together, is the oldest in the RAD Group (a group of high-tech companies). In the years that followed, another 27 independent high-tech companies were added to the group's framework, which were established to develop, produce and market a wide variety of products in the field of data communication.

As of 2013, RAD Group had 10 Israeli companies engaged in data communications. Yehuda was the chairman of RAD Communication Computers, and in each of the group's companies at least one of the brothers served as a member of the board of directors.

In December 1991, Zisapel and his wife Nava, a professor of neurochemistry at Tel Aviv University, founded the pharmaceutical company "Neurim". The company produces melatonin with a delayed release for the treatment of insomnia. This after studies conducted by Nava on the effects of melatonin.

Zisapel died in March 2024, at the age of 82.

== Business philosophy ==
Each company in the RAD Group operated independently, without a holding company. Yet all were unified under a collective strategic vision. The companies collaborated in developing solutions, participated in joint marketing activities, and benefited from a shared management structure. This decentralized business philosophy aimed to maximize the advantages of smaller business units, including flexibility, entrepreneurial spirit, and focused management. As a result, since its inception in 1984, the RAD Group has spawned more than185 companies, 8 IPOs, and 19 mergers and acquisitions.

== Philanthropy and community activity ==
Yehuda and Zohar Zisapel donated $4.5 million to establish the Sara and Moshe Zisapel Nanoelectronics Center at their alma mater, the Technion, named in memory of their parents.

Under the auspices of the Technion alumni organization, headed by Yehuda for six years, the brothers initiated two projects that use the skills of Technion graduates as mentors and teachers for underprivileged youth in cities and communities across the country. The program, called "Poalim from 3 to 5," aims to improve the mathematical skills of teenagers in peripheral settlements in the north and south of Israel.

Yehuda and his brother Zohar Zisapel donated $4.5 million to establish the Sara and Moshe Zisapel Nanoelectronics Center at their alma mater, the Technion, named in memory of their parents.

== Awards and recognition ==
- 1994 – Israel Export Award and Entrepreneur of the Year Award
- 1996 – Hugo Raminceanu Award for Economics
- 1998 – Named by the Technion as a Distinguished Fellow of its Faculty of Electrical Engineering
- 1999 – Israeli Industry Life Award
- 2001 – Doctor Honoris Causa from the Technion
- 2022 – the Technion medal, the highest award given by the Technion for lifetime achievement for the Technion and contribution to the advancement of humanity, the welfare of the Jewish people and the State of Israel.

== See also ==
- RAD Group
