= Kormoran (disambiguation) =

Kormoran (German for cormorant) may refer to:

== Ships ==
- SMS Cormoran (1892), a light cruiser built by the German Kaiserliche Marine
- German armed merchant raider SMS Cormoran (1914), a transport ship built for Russia and captured by the German raider SMS Emden during World War I
- German auxiliary cruiser Kormoran (1938), an auxiliary cruiser operated during World War II by the Kriegsmarine, which was lost following a mutually destructive engagement with the Australian light cruiser HMAS Sydney in 1941
- German fast attack craft Kormoran (S28), a Seeadler class fast attack craft of the German Navy, which operated from 1959 until 1976, then was sold to the Hellenic Navy as Scorpius
- German fast attack craft Kormoran (S70), an Albatros class fast attack craft operated by the German Navy from 1977 to 2005, when she was sold to Tunisia and renamed Giscon
- ORP Kormoran (T-24) - Polish minesweeper of Project 253L (T-301) class, in service in 1946-1959
- ORP Kormoran (616) - Polish minesweeper of Project 206F class, in service in 1964-1993
- Kormoran 2 class minehunter, a proposed class of three to six minehunters for the Polish navy

== Other ==
- AS.34 Kormoran, a German-designed anti-ship missile currently used by the German and Italian air forces
- PZL Bielsko SZD-27 Kormoran, a Polish-designed two-seat glider
- a brand of tyres owned by Michelin
- The Kormoran project, a fictional plan in the Matthew Reilly novel Scarecrow to create nuclear-armed warships disguised as merchant vessels
- Operation Kormoran, a Holocaust operation between 25 May and 17 June 1944, which killed 7,697 people
- Kormoran District, an administrative division of the Polish city Olsztyn

== See also ==
- Cormorant (disambiguation)
