= Rocky Colavito =

American baseball player (1933–2024)

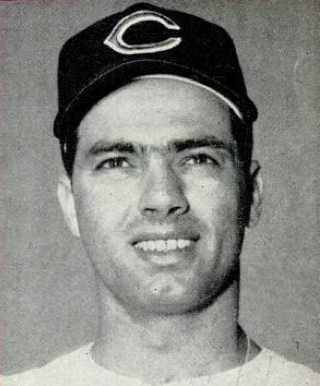
- Colavito in 1959
- Outfielder
- Born: August 10, 1933; New York City, New York, U.S.
- Died: December 10, 2024 (aged 91); Bernville, Pennsylvania, U.S.
- Batted: Right Threw: Right

MLB debut
- September 10, 1955, for the Cleveland Indians

Last MLB appearance
- September 28, 1968, for the New York Yankees

MLB statistics
- Batting average: .266
- Home runs: 374
- Runs batted in: 1,159
- Stats at Baseball Reference

Teams
- As player: Cleveland Indians (1955–1959); Detroit Tigers (1960–1963); Kansas City Athletics (1964); Cleveland Indians (1965–1967); Chicago White Sox (1967); Los Angeles Dodgers (1968); New York Yankees (1968); As coach: Cleveland Indians (1973, 1976–1978); Kansas City Royals (1982–1983)

Career highlights and awards
- 9× All-Star (1959, 1959², 1961–1962², 1964–1966); AL home run leader (1959); AL RBI leader (1965); Hit four home runs in one game on June 10, 1959; Cleveland Guardians Hall of Fame

Rocco Domenico "Rocky" Colavito Jr. (/kɒləˈviːtoʊ/ kol-ə-VEE-toh; August 10, 1933 – December 10, 2024) was an American professional baseball player, coach, and television sports commentator. He played in Major League Baseball (MLB) as an outfielder from 1955 to 1968, most prominently as a member of the Cleveland Indians, with whom he established himself as a fan favorite for his powerful hitting and his strong throwing arm. Colavito also played for the Detroit Tigers, Kansas City Athletics, Chicago White Sox, Los Angeles Dodgers, and New York Yankees. At the time of his retirement in 1968, Colavito ranked third among AL right-handed hitters for home runs (374) and eighth for AL games played as a right fielder (1,272).

A nine-time All-Star, Colavito averaged 33 home runs per year for his first eleven seasons, exceeding 40 home runs three times and 100 runs batted in six times. He is the fifth player in the history of the American League (AL) to have eleven consecutive 20 home run seasons (1956–1966). In 1959, he hit four consecutive home runs in one game and, was the AL home run champion. He was also the first outfielder in AL history to complete a season without making an error.

After his playing career, Colavito worked as a television sports color commentator for WJW (TV) before returning to the playing field to serve as a coach with the Indians and the Kansas City Royals. In 2001, Colavito was voted one of the 100 greatest players in Cleveland Indians' history by a panel of veteran baseball writers, executives and historians. He was inducted into the Cleveland Guardians Hall of Fame in 2006.

== Early years ==
Colavito was born and raised in the Bronx, a borough of New York City, where he became a devoted New York Yankees fan, particularly of Joe DiMaggio. At the age of sixteen, he dropped out of Theodore Roosevelt High School after his sophomore year to play semi-professional baseball in hopes that it would lead to his dream of playing in Major League Baseball (MLB).

MLB rules called for a player to wait until his school class graduated before signing, and only a special appeal allowed him to go pro after a one-year wait. The Yankees expressed little interest in him, and the Philadelphia Athletics had to bow out due to financial problems. The Cleveland Indians did take interest in his strong throwing arm (Indians scout Mike McNally had watched him try out in Yankee Stadium) and signed him at age 17 as an undrafted amateur free agent on January 1, 1951, with two-thirds of his signing bonus deferred until he progressed in their system. In 1954, Colavito hit 38 home runs and drove in 116 RBIs for the minor league baseball team, Indianapolis Indians.

== Baseball career ==
=== Cleveland Indians ===
Colavito made his MLB debut on September 10, 1955 for the Cleveland Indians. In 1956, he started the season playing in the Pacific Coast League, once showing off his throwing arm by hurling a ball over the center-field wall, 436 feet (133 m) from home plate. In July, he returned to the Indians. He finished the season batting .276 with 21 home runs, and was tied for runner-up in the AL Rookie of the Year voting. In 1957, he batted .252 with 25 home runs. In 1958, Colavito, now wearing number 6, batted a career-high .303 with 41 home runs (one behind league leader Mickey Mantle) and 113 runs batted in. He led the AL that season in slugging with a .620 average (the highest by an Indians right-handed hitter until Albert Belle in 1994), and finished third in the MVP balloting. Colavito also pitched three hitless innings for Cleveland against the Detroit Tigers on August 13 that season.

In 1959, Colavito hit 42 home runs and became the first Indians player to have two consecutive 40-HR seasons; he tied Harmon Killebrew for the AL lead that season (was one short of Al Rosen's club record) and was the AL leader in extra-base hits (66) and total bases (301). On June 10, at Baltimore Orioles' cavernous Memorial Stadium, he became the second player in AL history to hit four consecutive home runs in a nine-inning game; Lou Gehrig hit four in 1932. In an interview in 2021, Colavito called the game the highlight of his career. He was selected for both of the All-Star Games held for the first time that season and homered in Game 2 (two All-Star games were held annually in 1959 through 1962). In the AL pennant race that year, the Indians finished second, five games behind the Chicago White Sox. This was the closest he would come to a title until 1967. He also finished fourth in the MVP vote. Colavito would hit 30-plus home runs for seven seasons, establishing himself as a consistent power hitter. He also was an excellent outfielder with a very strong arm despite being flat-footed.

=== Detroit Tigers ===
On April 17, 1960, Indians general manager Frank Lane unexpectedly traded him to the Detroit Tigers for Harvey Kuenn (the 1959 AL batting champion, having hit .353) just two days before the opening day of the season in Cleveland against the Tigers. The trade proved to be a good one for the Tigers but an unpopular trade for the Indians, whose fans lost their favorite player and best hitter. Kuenn, who had a minor injury early in the season, hit .308 for the Indians, but was traded at the end of the year. The Tigers played Colavito in right field because of his strong throwing arm, moving Al Kaline to center field that season. Colavito hit .249 with 35 home runs and 87 RBI. In 1961, Colavito hit .290 with a career-high 45 home runs, 140 RBI, and 129 runs scored. Detroit led the Major Leagues in scoring, and he placed eighth in the MVP race. Colavito was switched from right field to left field for the Tigers, and Kaline was reestablished in right field. Colavito was selected for both All-Star Games again and homered in Game 2. During a doubleheader that season against the Washington Senators at Griffith Stadium, he hit 4 home runs, 3 in Game 2.

Detroit Free Press sportswriter Joe Falls, who viewed Colavito as a "self-ordained deity", began going after Colavito in the press and started a feature chronicling the runs he failed to drive in; whenever Colavito stranded a runner, Falls would give him the facetious statistic "RNBI" (Run Not Batted In). This infuriated Colavito and created a tense relationship between the two men for several years. In one game, Falls – acting as the official scorer – charged Colavito with a controversial error, causing Colavito to confront him after the game. Another time when Colavito was in a batting slump and the Tigers fans started razzing him for it, he threw a ball he barely caught in left field over the right-field light tower and roof. On May 12, 1961, Colavito was ejected from a game with the Yankees in New York after climbing into the stands, which was against MLB rules (though other Tigers players who followed Colavito into the stands were not ejected), to go after a drunken Yankee fan who had been scuffling with his father there after the fan started harassing Colavito's wife. The Tigers played the game under protest, which they won 4–3. Colavito ($35,000 in 1961) drew Detroit fans' criticism by holding out for a higher 1962 salary ($54,000) than established team star Al Kaline ($39,000 to $49,000). In 1962, Colavito had 164 hits (Kaline 121), 37 home runs (Kaline 29), and 112 RBI (Kaline 94). He was selected for both All-Star Games for the third time and homered in Game 2. In 1963, Colavito hit .271, with 22 homers and 91 RBI.

=== Kansas City Athletics ===
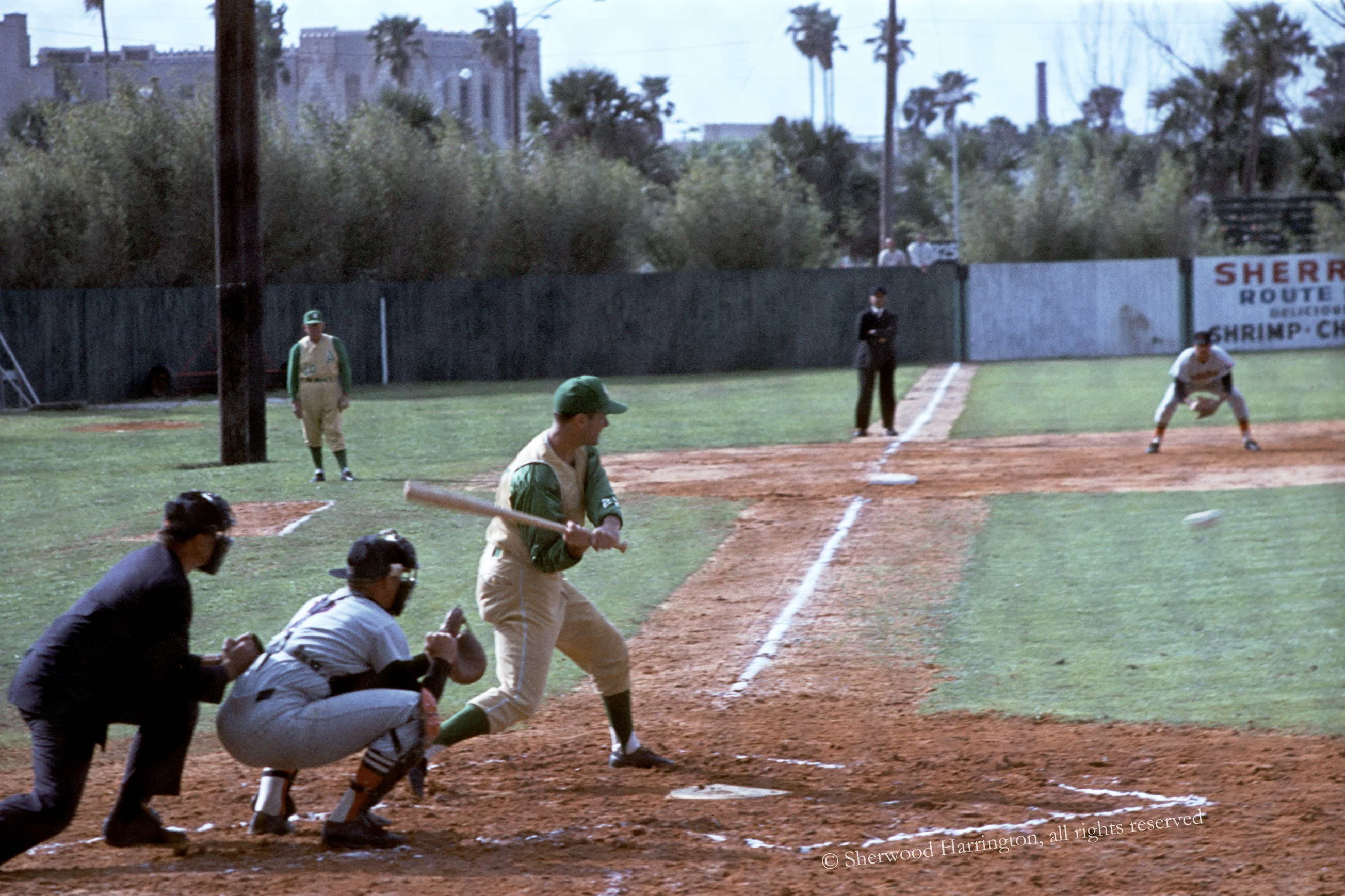
Colavito batting for the Kansas City A's during spring training in 1964

Colavito was dealt along with Bob Anderson and $50,000 from the Tigers to the Kansas City Athletics for Jerry Lumpe, Dave Wickersham and Ed Rakow on November 18, 1963. He spent only one season with Kansas City, earning a $50,000 salary as the highest-paid player on the A's. On September 11, 1964, at 31, he became one of the youngest players to reach the 300-home-run mark (also was his 900th RBI), doing so against the Baltimore Orioles. Colavito hit .274, with 164 hits, 34 home runs, 31 doubles, and 102 RBI for the A's. He also was selected for the All-Star Game. The A's had finished in last place with a 57–105 record.

=== Return to Cleveland ===
In January 1965, Colavito returned to Cleveland in a three-team trade. Cleveland traded pitcher Tommy John, outfielder Tommie Agee, and catcher John Romano to the Chicago White Sox. The White Sox sent catcher Cam Carreon to Cleveland, and outfielder Mike Hershberger, center fielder Jim Landis, and pitcher Fred Talbot (February) to Kansas City.

During the home opener on April 21, with a crowd of 44,000, Colavito (uniform #21) hit a two-run homer. He hit .287 that season, and placed fifth in the MVP vote after leading the AL in RBI (108) and walks (93). He finished among the league's top five players in home runs (26), hits (170), and runs (92). He also was selected for his eighth All-Star Game. Colavito played in all of Cleveland's 162 games without committing an error (274 chances), but did not win one of the three AL Gold Glove Awards for an outfielder. On September 6, he got his 1,000th RBI. The Indians finished in 5th place with an 87–75 record.

In 1966, Colavito hit .238 with 30 home runs and 72 RBI. He also was selected for his ninth and last All-Star Game. The Indians finished in 5th place with an 81–81 record. Colavito received a $55,000 and $57,000 salary from Cleveland, the highest given to an Indians' team player during those two years.

=== Chicago White Sox, LA Dodgers, and NY Yankees ===
In late July 1967, Colavito (hitting .241 with 5 home runs and 21 RBI) was traded by the Indians to the Chicago White Sox, who finished three games out of first that season. In 60 games for the White Sox that season, Colavito managed to get 42 hits with 3 home runs and 29 RBI.

In March 1968, his contract was purchased by the Los Angeles Dodgers from the White Sox. Colavito hit 3 home runs for the Dodgers in his National League debut, and batted .204 with 23 hits in 60 games. He was released by the Dodgers on July 11 that season.

On July 15, 1968, Colavito was signed as a free agent by the New York Yankees, the last team and season of his 14-year MLB playing career. During his first time up batting for the Yankees, he hit a three-run homer against the Senators. On August 25, Colavito (uniform #29), who was now 35 years old, became the last position player until Brent Mayne in 2000 to be credited as the winning pitcher in a game. He pitched 2 2/3 scoreless innings as a reliever in the first game of a doubleheader against the league-leading Detroit Tigers. Not only did he face down Al Kaline and Willie Horton, he further vexed the Tigers by scoring the winning run for the Yanks in the eighth inning. He also homered in the second game. Colavito's pitching feat as a Yankee was not seen again in the AL until May 6, 2012, when Baltimore Oriole Chris Davis earned a win. Colavito got 20 hits including 5 home runs in 39 games played for the Yankees. He was released by the Yankees on September 30, 1968 and retired as a player.

=== Later career ===
Colavito was hired by the Cleveland Indians as a broadcaster on WJW-TV for the 1972 season. He was a first base coach for the Indians during the 1973 season, broadcaster during the 1975 season, hitting coach and broadcaster during the 1976 season, and first base coach during the 1977 and 1978 seasons. He was a hitting coach for the Kansas City Royals during the 1982 and 1983 seasons.

In 1982, Colavito and Kansas City Royals Manager Dick Howser, a former shortstop for the Indians, were involved in a traffic accident and struggle with police. Colavito and Howser were convicted of interfering with police and received 90-day jail sentences. Both appealed and served six months of probation.

Colavito was involved in the 1983 pine tar game and was ejected for arguing the umpires' decision to negate George Brett's home run and call him out, which would have given the Yankees the win; the decision was later overturned, the game was resumed a month later with the Royals in the lead as the result of Brett's home run, and the Royals won the game.

== Personal life and death ==
Colavito married Carmen Perrotti, a professional dancer, in 1954. On August 11, 2015, he had to have his right leg amputated below the knee due to problems with type 2 diabetes, from which he had suffered for a number of years.

Colavito died from type 2 diabetes at his home in Bernville, Pennsylvania, on December 10, 2024, at the age of 91.

== MLB achievements ==
Notable achievements:

- 6-time AL All-Star (1959, 1961, 1962, 1964, 1965, 1966)
- AL Slugging Percentage Leader (1958)
- 2-time AL Total Bases Leader (1959, 1962)
- AL Home Runs Leader (1959)
- AL RBI Leader (1965)
- AL Base on Ball Leader (1965)
- 20-Home Run Seasons: 11 (1956–1966)
- 30-Home Run Seasons: 7 (1956–1962, 1964, 1966)
- 40-Home Run Seasons: 3 (1958, 1959, 1961)
- 100 RBI Seasons: 6 (1958, 1959, 1961, 1962, 1964, 1965)
- 100 Runs Scored Seasons: 1 (1961)

Other achievements:

- 9 All-Star Games (1959–2, 1961–2, 1962–2, 1964, 1965, 1966)
- ML Fielding Percentage Leader as Right Fielder (1965)
- ML Fielding Percentage Leader as Outfielder (1965)
- Four consecutive home runs in one game (1959)
- Four home runs in one game (1959)

== Legacy ==
Colavito was one of the most popular power hitters and outfielders of his time and had one of the best throwing arms in baseball.

In 2001, Colavito received a huge ovation at the introduction of the Indians' All-Century team.

On July 29, 2006, Colavito, along with Ray Chapman, Addie Joss, Sam McDowell, Al Rosen, Herb Score and manager Al López, were all inducted into the Cleveland Indians Hall of Fame.

On August 10, 2021, his 88th birthday, a statue of Colavito was unveiled at Tony Brush Park in Cleveland's Little Italy. Colavito was in attendance for the ceremony.

== The Curse of Rocky Colavito ==
In 1994, Terry Pluto, who covered the Cleveland Indians for The Plain Dealer in the 1980s and became the top sports columnist for the Akron Beacon Journal (but returned to The Plain Dealer in 2007), published The Curse of Rocky Colavito, a book that tried to explain why the Indians had not come within even 11 games of first place since 1959. Pluto's explanation was that the trade of Colavito by the Indians in 1960 sent the team on a path to mediocrity that lasted more than three decades. He also suggested that the trade in 1965 to bring Colavito back to the Indians was just as bad as the one that had sent him away.

Pluto wrote a sequel, Burying the Curse, in 1995, after the Cleveland Indians won their first American League Championship in 41 years that season. Cleveland lost the World Series 4–2 to the Atlanta Braves. In 1997, the Indians won the AL pennant again, but lost the World Series 4–3 to the Florida Marlins after needing just two more outs in Game 7 to win. In 1999, Pluto wrote the book Our Tribe, a history of the Cleveland Indians. Pluto insists in the book that the curse is still in effect.

The Indians won the American League Championship again 19 years later, in 2016. Cleveland lost the World Series to the Chicago Cubs 4–3; Cleveland's last World Series title was in 1948, when they defeated the Boston Braves.

== See also ==
- List of Major League Baseball career home run leaders
- List of Major League Baseball career runs batted in leaders
- List of Major League Baseball annual runs batted in leaders
- List of Major League Baseball annual home run leaders
- List of Major League Baseball single-game home run leaders
- List of Major League Baseball single-game hits leaders

Achievements
Preceded by Joe Adcock	Batters with four home runs in one game June 10, 1959	Succeeded by Willie Mays
