= Madge Networks =

Networking technology company

Madge Networks NV was a networking technology company founded by Robert Madge, and is best known for its work with Token Ring. It was a global leader and pioneer of high-speed networking solutions in the mid-1990s, and also made significant contributions to technologies such as Asynchronous Transfer Mode (ATM) and Ethernet.

The company filed for bankruptcy in April 2003. The operational business of the company is currently trading as Madge Ltd. in the UK. Under a deal with Network Technology PLC, the company acquired the rights and copyright to Madge's products, brand and website, as well as the remaining inventory. The assets will be absorbed by Network Technology PLC subsidiary Ringdale Limited, making them the world's largest supplier of Token Ring technology.

== Technology development ==
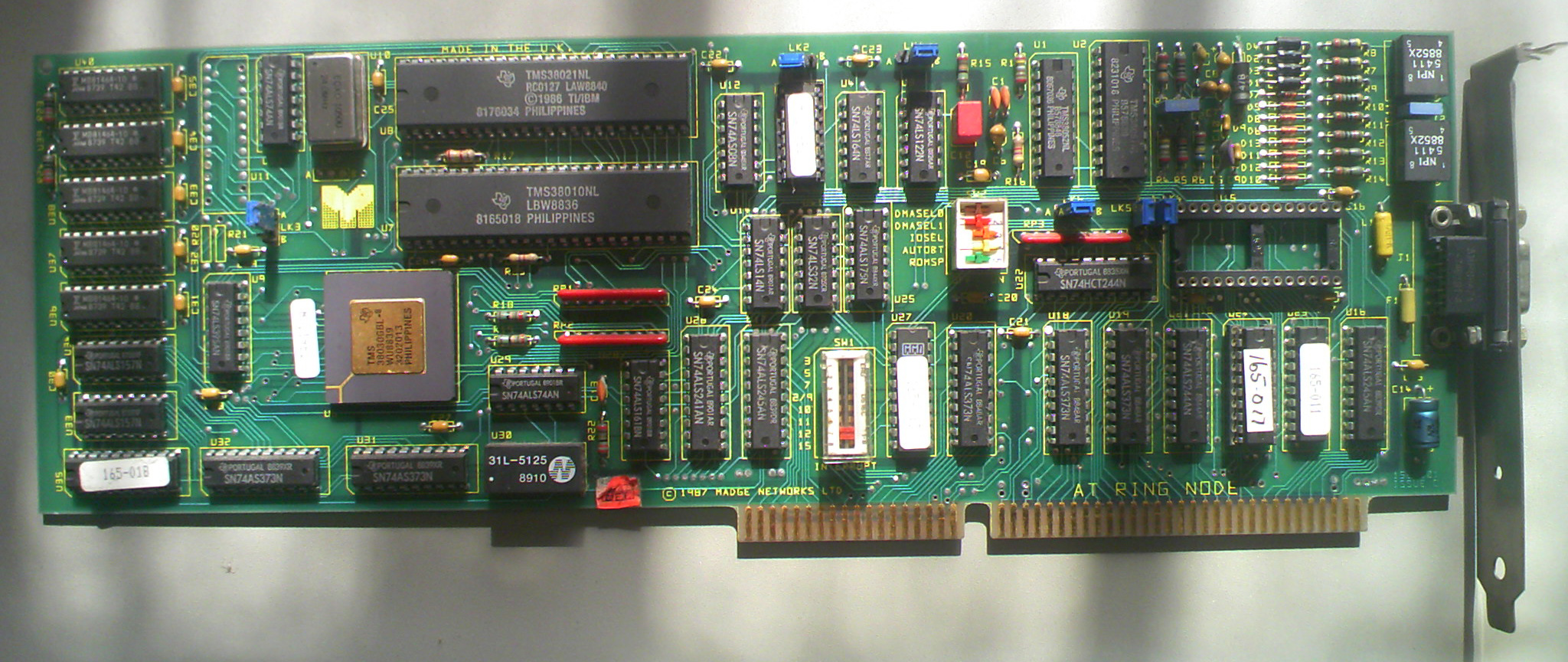
Madge 4/16 Mbit/s TokenRing ISA NIC

Madge Networks was once one of the world's leading suppliers of networking hardware. Headquartered in Wexham, England, Madge Networks developed Token Ring, Ethernet, ATM, ISDN, and other products providing extensive networking solutions. The company's products ranged from ISA/PCI network adapters for personal computers to work group switching hubs, routers, and ISDN backbone carriers. Madge focus was to provide convergence solutions in Ethernet, Token Ring, ISDN, and the then emerging ATM networking technologies. In addition to its Wexham headquarters, Madge operated main offices in Eatontown, New Jersey and San Jose, California, as well as offices in more than 25 countries throughout the world.

Founded in 1986, Madge Networks was a pioneer in the networking market, the emergence of which went on to define internal and external communications among corporations in every industry. Madge Networks was one of the world's leading proponents of Token Ring technology, producing ISA, PCI, and PC card adapters, switches, stacks, and other devices required for its implementation of Token Ring technology.

In the late 1990s Madge Networks had taken a leading role in developing the standards and first implementations of emerging High-Speed Token Ring (HSTR) technology. This newer protocol provided for a dramatic increase in data transmission bandwidth, while remaining compatible with first-generation Token Ring technology.

The sale of their Ethernet technology (LANNET) to Lucent Technologies in July 1998 reduced Madge Networks' presence in the Ethernet market, a rival networking technology to the Token Ring standard. The company tightened focus in the ATM market, emerging video conferencing technology and other ISDN carrier applications. Madge produced switching, routing and WAN-LAN interfacing equipment to facilitate both intracorporate and intercorporate video conferencing. In the ISDN market, the trend to use digital telephone lines to increase data, voice, and video transmission bandwidth, led Madge to develop a line of Edge Switching Nodes (ESNs) and other miscellaneous carrier equipment.

== Corporate history ==
One-time horseback riding instructor, Robert Madge entered the computer industry with Britain's Intelligent Software Ltd., designing computer-driven chess games. The company's involvement in developing the Enterprise microcomputer saw Madge in the role of project manager for that product. In 1986 Madge sought to set up his own business, opening shop on his family's Buckinghamshire farm.

=== Initial years ===
The Ethernet field was already crowded with competitors by the mid-1980s, where most of the money had been made by 3COM in the adapter market with their 3C509 series, then swiftly moving on to the Ethernet switching. Other companies avoided the Token Ring market in preference to IBM. Meanwhile, Madge developed a profitable business operating in IBM's shadow. Madge Networks introduced its first Token Ring products by 1987. The company quickly opened up a second headquarters in San Jose, placing the company closer to the heart of the worldwide computer industry, with advantageous results: the company's US customers believed it to be a large British company, while its UK customers saw it as a successful US company.

Robert Madge led his company to extending the technology, introducing new products, such as the Smart Ringnode in 1989 and the company's Fastmac, and Fastmac+ technology in 1990, bringing it to the forefront of Token Ring research and development. By the early 1990s the company had outpaced even IBM's development efforts, with the larger company recommending Madge Network's products to its own customers. An early boost came from the licensing of Madge's Fastmac technology to Cisco Systems in 1990.

The company's revenues for 1990 reached $18 million. One year later, Madge's revenues nearly doubled, to $34 million. The rise of computer networking, however, had only just begun. By the following year Madge's revenues would near $100 million. At the end of 1992 the company had managed to increase its share of the Token Ring market to seven per cent – still minor compared with IBM's 76 per cent share. Until the early 1990s, Madge had been focusing on producing adapter cards, which were fitted to individual computers to connect them to the network. The company's expanding product line soon included the hubs and switching components needed to route data and allow the adapter cards to communicate.

Madge Networks rose rapidly through the 1990s, boosted by the boom in computer networking and by its own leading Token Ring technology. Madge successfully chipped away at IBM's Token Ring market lead, building Madge's share to more than 16 per cent by mid-decade. Overall, IBM's market share quickly dropped below 50 per cent – a movement aided in part by licensing agreements between Madge and networking specialist Cisco Systems.

=== Expansion ===
In the 1990s Madge continued to expand its international presence, opening new offices in South Africa, Germany, Hong Kong, Japan and France and building its San Jose office into a second headquarters. To fuel the company's growth, Madge Networks went public in 1993, offering more than six million shares on the NASDAQ stock exchange. By 1994 Madge Networks' revenues had topped $213 million, an impressive growth, but still minor in comparison with its main market competitors, Cisco Systems, 3Com Corp., Bay Networks, and Cabletron Systems. In addition, many Fortune 1000 companies sought a broader range of networking products than Madge could offer. Although Madge had performed well in the Token Ring arena, its Ethernet capability was lacking – even as Ethernet became the networking technology of choice in the mid-1990s.

In 1995 Madge Networks and Lannet Data Communications (of the RAD Group of companies), an Israel-based networking specialist with a focus on LAN switches for Ethernet-based networks, agreed to merge operations in a stock swap valued at some $300 million. Lannet's operations were merged into Madge Networks, creating Madge's Ethernet division. With combined revenues of $283 million, Madge and Lannet were the smallest of the top five networking market leaders, but the combined company's product line offered a complete array of Token Ring and Ethernet products.

The merger gave Madge the ability to combine the rival networking technologies into hybrid systems and the capacity to bridge the company's products into the latest networking technology, ATM, or asynchronous transfer mode. By the mid-1990s companies were straining the limits of the existing networking technologies. As corporations joined more and more of their work force to the company network, their networks quickly ran short of bandwidth for transmitting data. The arrival of new networking applications – in particular, video conferencing and video data transfers, not only pushed bandwidth needs to the extreme, but threatened to cripple networks entirely. ATM's more efficient use of packet technology offered the prospective of dramatic bandwidth gains. Adoption of the technology would require corporations to rebuild their networking infrastructure, and Madge Networks readied not only its own ATM products, but also the hubs and switches needed to bridge existing Token Ring and Ethernet equipment to the new technology. The Lannet merger enhanced Madge's portfolio of LAN switches, needed to connect Ethernet and Token Ring stations to corporate ATM installations. An important consideration is that Madge focussed on ATM as a Local Area Network (LAN) technology, and not as a carrier backbone Wide-Area Network (WAN) solution. In fact, Madge bet on ATM replacing not just Token-Ring and Ethernet, but even TCP/IP as THE desktop PC and laptop networking technology. This proved to be a costly mistake, when enterprise customers did not adopt ATM, opting to go to switched Ethernet instead. The company's ATM products were mostly unsuitable for the Carrier market, and so most of the company's investment in future products did not produce any returns. This wrong market/technology focus was a large factor in Madge's eventual failure.

Aiding Madge's growth was the 1995 agreement with Cisco Systems, by then global networking leader, to incorporate Madge's Token Ring switches into Cisco's products and to license other parts of Madge's Token Ring technology for future Cisco designs. At the same time, Madge gained access to Cisco-developed LAN and WAN switching software. Following on the Cisco agreement, Madge also prepared to step up its manufacturing capacity, with a new facility in Ireland.

By the end of 1995, the merged Madge-Lannet contained some 1,400 employees and achieved revenues of more than $400 million, all but 15 per cent of which coming from outside its UK base. The company's entry into 1996 continued its expansion efforts, including adding to its Israeli manufacturing capacity with a new $10 million plant in Jerusalem. In February 1996, acquired Teleos Communications Inc., along with that company's ISDN and WAN access products. Based in Eatontown, Teleos, which posted revenues of $24 million in 1995, cost Madge $165 million in a pooling of interests transactions. At the same time, Madge again deepened its relationship with Cisco Systems, broadening the company's licensing agreements to include Cisco's IOS software. This agreement never extended beyond the Sefton Park R&D facility and few customers were even aware of it or ever saw benefits from it; neither did their own support engineers.

At the end of 1996 Madge rolled out a new line of products to enhance its portfolio and bring the company into a new and increasingly important market: video conferencing. Madge's products placed the company in position to offer bridge solutions between the formerly independent data and video transmission technologies. Although the video conferencing market had yet to mature, Madge's move appeared to place it firmly near the lead to compete for what analysts considered a future boom market.

=== Decline ===
After years of strong expansion, the company's revenues for 1996 reached only $482 million. In 1997 the company began posting losses; analysts suggested that the company, in attempting to broaden its product line and move to direct sales rather than through VARs had lost its product focus. By August 1997 the company was forced to restructure, laying off some 650 employees. During the mid-1990s, Madge had attempted to transfer the bulk of its headquarters operations to the United States, building up employee capacity around its San Jose offices. The market decline of ATM technology, however, proved difficult for the company to overcome. The choice was made to concentrate the company's activities in the similar England-Israel times zones, and the company's U.S. offices were scaled back.

Madge's restructuring continued to occupy the company into 1998. In late 1997 the company spun off its Ethernet division into a separate subsidiary, once again named Lannet. After denying early reports that it was looking to divest its Ethernet business, Madge agreed to sell Lannet to Lucent Technologies for $117 million in July 1998. During this period, Madge also moved to exit the manufacturing business, selling its Ireland plant to Celestica, an electronics contract manufacturer. The total cost of Madge's restructuring passed $50 million, but the company's renewed commitment to Token Ring technology appeared to have stabilized the company's balance sheet. By mid-1998 Madge had once again returned to profitability, but with only fifty or so employees.

In the late 1990s Madge's attention focused on developing the next-generation Token Ring technology, High-Speed Token Ring, offering scalable bandwidth from 16 Mbit/s to 100 Mbit/s, with future speeds reaching into the gigabit ranges. They had also become the only large producer of Token Ring technology besides IBM by acquiring the Token Ring business from competitor Olicom. But abandoning Ethernet marked the beginning of the end for Madge Networks, a move capped by the zero return on extensive ATM investment, something they would never recover from. After 1998 they transformed yet again with wireless 802.11 technology, without success.

Madge Networks has now been absorbed into Ringdale Limited through a management buyout after Madge Networks filed for bankruptcy in 2003.
