= PWE3 =

Pseudo-Wire Emulation Edge-to-Edge (PWE3) is a networking technique that allows service providers to carry traditional communication services—such as Ethernet, Frame Relay, ATM, or TDM across modern packet-switched networks like Internet Protocol or Multiprotocol Label Switching. It works by creating a virtual connection, called a pseudowire, between two endpoints in the network. This pseudowire encapsulates the original data frames or signals so they can travel across the packet network while preserving the behavior of the original service. To the devices at each end, the connection appears similar to a direct physical link, even though the traffic is actually being transported over a shared packet infrastructure. PWE3 is commonly used by telecommunications service providers to integrate legacy services with newer network technologies.

== IETF working group ==
In 2001, the IETF set up the Pseudowire Emulation Edge to Edge working group, and this group adopted the initialism PWE3 (the 3 standing for the third power of E, i.e. EEE). The working group was chartered to develop an architecture for service provider edge-to-edge pseudowires and service-specific documents detailing the encapsulation techniques.

In computer networking and telecommunications, a pseudowire (PW) is an emulation of a native service over a packet-switched network (PSN). The native service may be ATM, Frame Relay, Ethernet, low-rate TDM, or SONET/SDH, while the PSN may be MPLS, IP (either IPv4 or IPv6), or L2TPv3.

The working group chairs were originally Danny McPherson and Luca Martini, but following Martini's resignation Stewart Bryant became co-chair.
