= Silicom =

Silicom Ltd.
- Type: Public
- Traded as: Nasdaq: SILC; TASE: SILC
- Industry: Computer Systems; Communications
- Founded: 1987; 39 years ago
- Founder: Avi Eizenman
- Headquarters: Kfar Sava, Israel
- Key people: Shaike Orbach (CEO & president)
- Products: Network cards Server adapters
- Revenue: ▲US$ 150 million (2022)
- Operating income: ▲US$ 20 million (2022)
- Net income: ▲US$ 18 million (2022)
- Parent: Rad Group
- Website: silicom-usa.com

Silicom Ltd. is a publicly traded company, headquartered in Israel, that specializes in the design, manufacture and marketing of connectivity solutions for a range of servers and server-based systems. Its shares are listed on the NASDAQ Global Market and on the Tel Aviv Stock Exchange. Silicom is a member of the RAD Group family of companies.

== Corporate history ==
Silicom was founded in 1987 by Avi Eizenman. The company initially focused on providing integrated circuits products for information technology solution manufacturers. In the early 1990s, Silicom began focusing on designing and manufacturing a range of connectivity solutions for mobile and personal computers users. In subsequent years the company started developing several broadband internet related products. In 1994 Silicom had an initial public offering on the NASDAQ

In 2002, Silicom started to develop a line of high-end Multi-Port server networking cards, which became the principal driver of the company sales growth since. In 2003 the company began implementing a “Design Win” business model, selling its products to customers that incorporate them within their networking appliances and/or server-based systems and sell such systems with Silicom's products embedded in them. Since then, the company's core market is the server-based network appliances market and specifically the server-based security appliances and WAN optimization appliances.

On December 27, 2005, the company's share also started trading on the Tel Aviv Stock Exchange.

== Products ==
The company's product lines include high-end server networking cards with and without server adapters. These are products that facilitate improved connectivity for servers by increasing the number of ports on the server adapters and by adding bypass and other special functionality for security appliances, WAN optimization appliances and other network appliances. In 2009, the company launched a new product family, the SErver To Appliance Converter (SETAC), which is designed for providers of appliance-based network solutions.

== See also ==
- Silicon Wadi
