= Zohar Zisapel =

Israeli businessman (1949–2023)

- זהר זיסאפל
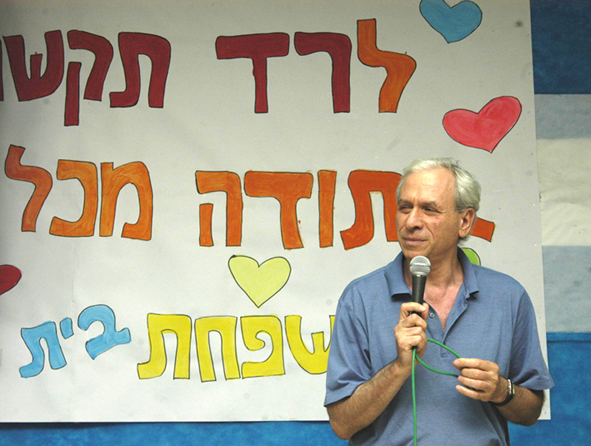
- Zisapel in 2006
- Born: February 15, 1949; Tel Aviv, Israel
- Died: May 20, 2023 (aged 74); Tel Aviv, Israel
- Education: Technion, Tel Aviv University
- Occupation: Entrepreneur
- Known for: "Father" of Israel's high-tech industry

Zohar Zisapel (Hebrew: זהר זיסאפל; February 15, 1949 – May 20, 2023) was an Israeli entrepreneur, businessman and philanthropist. He founded the RAD Group of companies with his brother, Yehuda.

== Early life and education ==
Zohar Zisapel was born in Tel Aviv, one of three children of immigrant parents from Poland who owned and ran a shoe store on Herzl Street, then one of the city’s main arteries. Upon graduation from high school he enrolled as a student at the Technion – Israel Institute of Technology in Haifa. He received his B.Sc. and M.Sc. in electrical engineering from the Technion and later earned an MBA from Tel Aviv University. To help finance his education, he worked in his spare time supplying lighting to Tel Aviv discos.

After finishing his undergraduate degree at the Technion, Zisapel served in an intelligence unit of the Israel Defense Forces (IDF).

== Career ==
Zisapel worked for the Electronic Research Department of the Ministry of Defense in Tel Aviv and rose to become its head. In 1979, he received the Israel Defense Prize for his work.

In the mid-1970s, Yehuda Zisapel, Zohar's elder brother, founded a small private company that marketed data communications products. The data communications products Bynet distributed in Israel in the later half of the 1970s were all manufactured abroad.

In 1981 Zisapel resigned from his position at the Ministry of Defense and cofounded RAD Data Communications Ltd. with his brother. Operating from small, cramped quarters in the back of Bynet’s offices, Zohar oversaw the development of RAD’s first product, a miniature modem that would revolutionize the industry. The modems that were then on the market were the size of pizza boxes. RAD’s modem, however, could fit into one’s hand, and did not require an independent power source, having been designed to operate instead by utilizing power flowing over the telephone line. One version of this modem, the SRM-3, would be recognized by the Guinness Book of Records as the smallest ever manufactured. Within two years of its founding, RAD had become a profitable international manufacturer of access solutions for data communications and telecommunications applications. In 1987 the company had reached $10 million in annual sales. RAD won the Israel Export Prize in 1993, the year in which its sales first exceeded $50 million. It surpassed the $100 million mark in global sales in 1996.

The Zisapel brothers expanded their focus beyond miniature modems. While RAD would go on to release its first fiber optic product in 1986 and its first multiplexer one year later, the Zisapels were developing new ideas for communications products for enterprise applications, including adapters for servers and security appliances, integrated network management solutions, video conferencing infrastructure and development tools, Wireless devices, and other industry niches. Rather than having their existing company branch out into new areas beyond its original mandate, the Zisapels found a new company that would focus on each specific industry niche they targeted. This approach grew into the RAD Group, a family of independent companies that develop, manufacture, and market solutions for diverse segments of the networking and telecommunications industries.

=== Business philosophy ===
Each company operated independently and without a holding company, but all of the companies would be guided under a collective strategic umbrella. The companies could cooperate in the development of their solutions, engage in joint marketing activities, and benefit from a common management structure. This decentralized business philosophy was designed to maximize the advantages inherent in smaller business units, such as flexibility, entrepreneurial spirit, and management focus. As a result, since 1984, when the RAD Group came into being, it has spawned more than 185 companies, 8 IPOs and 19 mergers and acquisitions.

== Activism ==
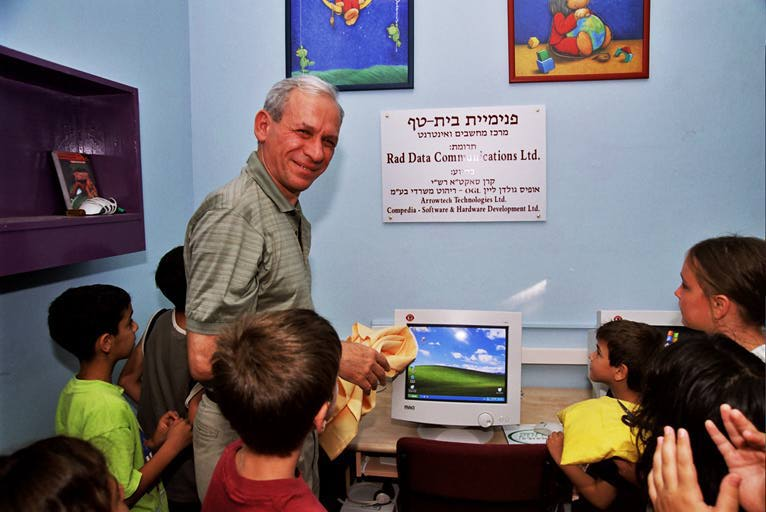
Zohar Zisapel at a residence for children at risk

One of Zisapel’s charitable contributions was to donate fully equipped computer rooms to educational institutions that serve children at risk and children from disadvantaged backgrounds. More than ten such projects are undertaken each year by RAD at a cost of approximately $500,000 annually. Zohar and Yehuda Zisapel also donated $4.5 million to establish the Sara and Moshe Zisapel Nanoelectronics Center at their alma mater, the Technion, named in memory of their parents.

From its early years, Zohar served as a member of the Board of Trustees of the Academic College of Tel Aviv-Yafo. Between 2005 and 2009 he served as chairman of its executive committee. He also contributed to the establishment of a large solar system located on campus. The system has been generating electricity since 2012, and its operation funds several tuition assistance scholarships awarded annually to computer science students.

== Awards and recognition ==
- 1994 – Israel Export Award and Entrepreneur of the Year Award
- 1996 – Hugo Raminceanu Award for Economics
- 1998 – Named by the Technion as a Distinguished Fellow of its Faculty of Electrical Engineering
- 1998–2000 – Chairman of the Israel Association of Electronic Industries (IAEI)
- 1999 – Israeli Industry Life Award
- 1999–2002 – Member of the planning and budgeting committee of the Council for Higher Education in Israel
- 2001 – Doctor Honoris Causa from the Technion
- 2004 – Israel Communications Award
- 2011 – Lifetime Achievement Award of the Israel Association of Electrical and Electronic Engineers
- 2013 – Named an Honorary Colleague by the Academic College of Tel Aviv-Yafo
- 2014 – Life Achievement Award of the Association of Engineers, Architects and Graduates in Technological Sciences in Israel
- 2022 - the Technion medal, the highest award given by the Technion for lifetime achievement for the Technion and for a contribution to the advancement of humanity, the welfare of the Jewish people and the State of Israel.

== Personal life ==
Zisapel was the father of two children: a daughter, Klil, an accomplished artist and Hebrew writer whose books have been translated into German, Dutch and Chinese, and Michael, a physician.

Zohar Zisapel died from cancer on May 20, 2023, at the age of 74.

== See also ==
- Adallom
