= USS Cormorant =

Three ships of the United States Navy have been named Cormorant, after the Cormorant, a genus of web-footed sea birds.

- USS Cormorant (AM-40), was launched on 5 February 1919 by Todd Shipbuilding Corporation in New York City.
- USS Cormorant (AMS-122), was launched on 8 June 1953 by Mare Island Naval Shipyard.
- USS Cormorant (MHC-57), is the seventh ship of Osprey-class minehunters.
