= RAD Data Communications =

Israeli manufacturer of networking equipment

- Company type: Private
- Industry: Telecommunications
- Founded: 1981; 45 years ago
- Founders: Yehuda Zisapel; Zohar Zisapel
- Headquarters: Tel Aviv, Israel
- Area served: Worldwide
- Key people: Chairman: Yehuda Zisapel, CEO: Udy Kashkash
- Products: Service Assured Access solutions for service providers and Service Assured Networking solutions for power utilities, transportation systems and government agencies
- Website: www.rad.com

RAD Data Communications Ltd. is a privately held corporation, headquartered in Tel Aviv, Israel that designs and manufacturers specialized networking equipment.

RAD is a member of the $1.3 billion RAD Group of companies.

== History ==
RAD was founded by brothers Yehuda and Zohar Zisapel in 1981 as a spin-off from Bynet, a networking hardware distribution company founded by Yehuda in 1973. Their goal was to develop their own products; the company was simply named RAD, for Research And Development.

RAD first successful product was a miniature (by 1980s standards) modem for telephone lines that did not require a separate power source. This novel concept quickly became a commercial success, and by 1985, RAD annual revenues reached $5.5 million. This initial product line evolved into RAD Data Communications, the largest company within the RAD Group.

In 2014, RAD opened a new $32 million advanced R&D center for developing NFV and SDN solutions in the southern Israeli city of Beersheba.

The company is active in industry standardization bodies such as the Broadband Forum, ETSI NFV ISG, International Telecommunication Union (ITU), Internet Engineering Task Force (IETF), and Metro Ethernet Forum (MEF).

One of the 46 copies of Rodin's The Thinker that were made from the original cast after the sculptor's death was acquired by Yehuda Zisapel and placed on permanent exhibit in the lobby of RAD's current Tel Aviv headquarters when the building was opened in 2000.

== Products ==
RAD's research, development and engineering includes hardware virtualization, operations, administration and management (OAM) and performance management; service assurance; traffic management; fault management; synchronization and timing over packet; TDM pseudowire; ASIC and FPGA development; hardware miniaturization; SFP form-factor solutions; and business DSL.

An early RAD modem, the SRM-3, was recognized as the world's smallest in the 1992 Guinness Book of World Records. Used for connecting asynchronous terminals to host computers, it measured 2.4 in (6.1 cm) by 1.2 in (3.0 cm) by .08 in (0.20 cm).

In 1998, RAD invented TDM over IP (TDMoIP®) technology and in 2013 it pioneered Distributed Network Function Virtualization (D-NFV®). At Mobile World Congress 2015, RAD introduced the world's first SFP-based IEEE 1588 Grandmaster clock with a built-in GNSS receiver.

In 2015 RAD also launched a virtual customer premises equipment (vCPE) device for IP and Carrier Ethernet services with a field pluggable module for hosting virtual network functions (VNFs) and in 2016 it added a white box option that is license-upgradable for network functions such as routing, service demarcation and performance monitoring. RAD's portfolio includes the smallest NFV-empowered device yet invented.

RAD has also been cited as an industry leader in developing communications platforms and security solutions for public utilities.

== Markets ==
The company's installed base now exceeds 15,000,000 units and includes more than 150 telecommunications carriers and service providers, in addition to a large number of public transportation systems, power utilities, governments, homeland security agencies, and educational institutions. RAD solutions are distributed through approximately 300 partner channels in over 150 countries. The company itself maintains 30 offices across six continents.

== Awards ==
- 1994: Israel Export Award

== See also ==
- Science and technology in Israel
- Silicon Wadi
- Economy of Israel
- List of networking hardware vendors
