= USS Kingfisher (MHC-56) =

Ship

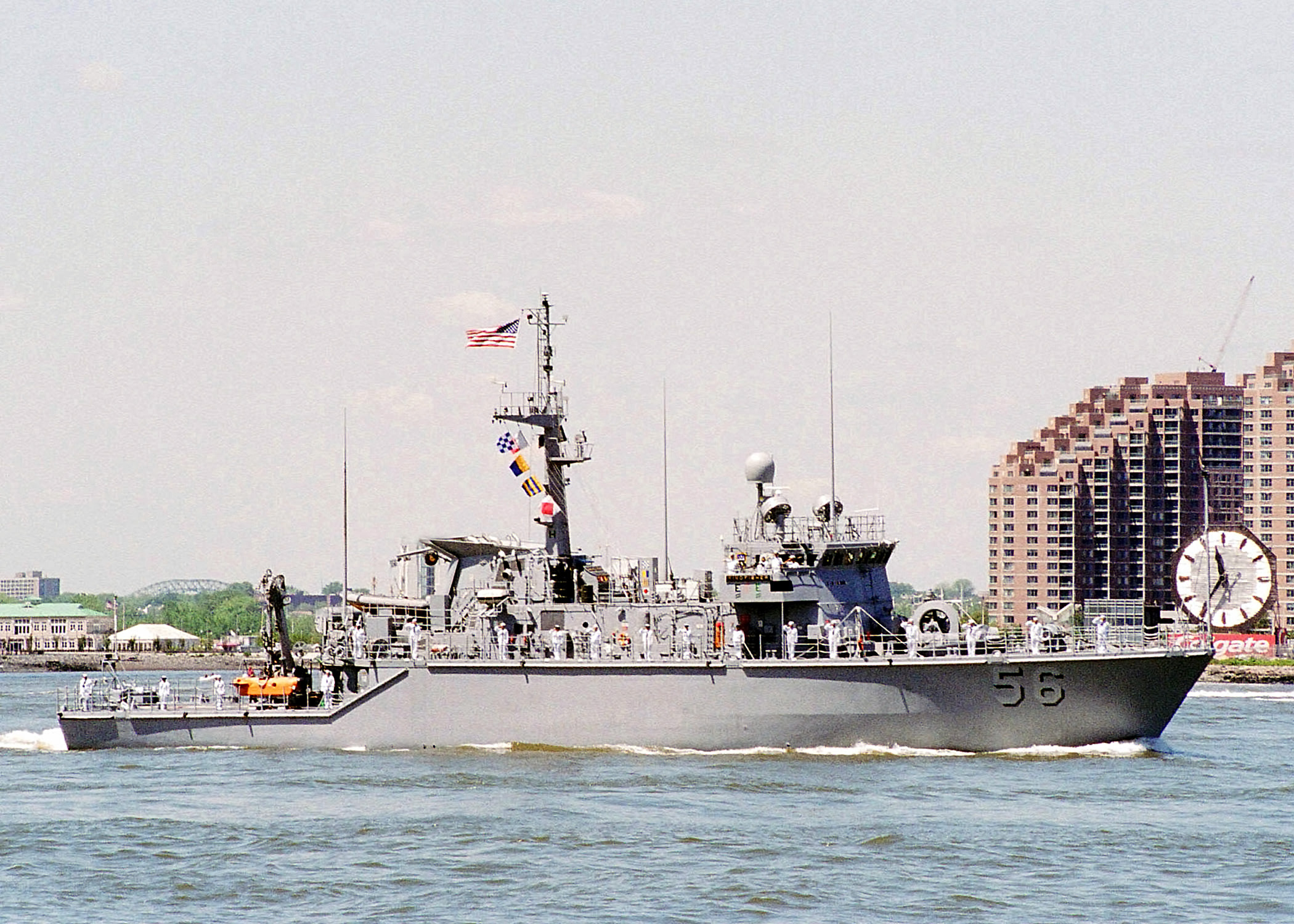
- USS Kingfisher on the Hudson River, 2003

History

United States
- Name: USS Kingfisher
- Namesake: Kingfisher
- Awarded: 29 March 1991
- Builder: Avondale Shipyards
- Laid down: 12 February 1993
- Launched: 18 June 1994
- Acquired: 24 July 1996
- Commissioned: 26 October 1996
- Decommissioned: 1 December 2007
- Stricken: 01 December 2007
- Fate: Sold by U.S. General Services Administration for scrap, 08 May 2014
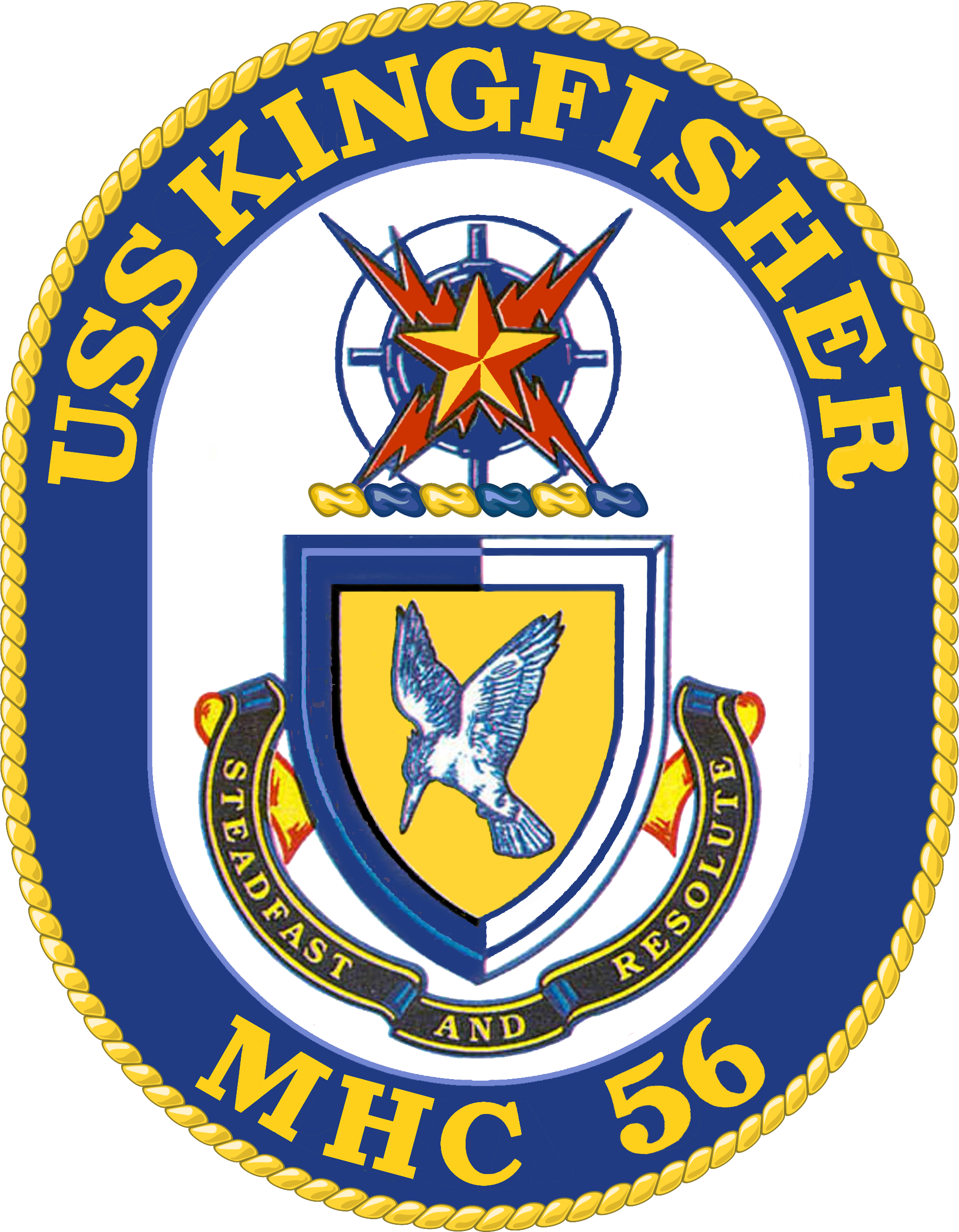
- Badge

General characteristics
- Class & type: Osprey-class coastal minehunter
- Displacement: 868 tons (light) 955 tons (full)
- Length: 188 ft (57 m)
- Beam: 36 ft (11 m)
- Draft: 11 ft (3.4 m)
- Propulsion: Two diesels (800 hp each)
- Speed: 12 knots (22 km/h; 14 mph)
- Complement: 5 officers and 46 enlisted
- Armament: Mine neutralization system & two .50 cal (12.7 mm) machine guns

USS Kingfisher (MHC-56) was the sixth ship of Osprey-class coastal mine hunters. She is named after the kingfisher.

Kingfisher was decommissioned in a joint ceremony along with three other Coastal Mine Hunters. She was the last Coastal Mine Hunter (MHC) in active service with the US Navy. She was transferred to a Naval Inactive Ships Storage Facility in Texas to await transfer under Foreign Military Sales. In September 2010, the US Senate had approved the sale of the ship to India along with USS Cormorant (MHC-57). This sale never happened. Stricken from the Navy list 01 December 2007, sold by U.S. General Services Administration for scrap, 08 May 2014.
