= L2TPv3 =

Third version of L2TP family

Layer 2 Tunneling Protocol version 3 is an IETF standard related to L2TP that can be used as an alternative protocol to Multiprotocol Label Switching (MPLS) for encapsulation of multiprotocol Layer 2 communications traffic over IP networks. Like L2TP, L2TPv3 provides a pseudo-wire service, but scaled to fit carrier requirements.

L2TPv3 can be regarded as being to MPLS what IP is to ATM: a simplified version of the same concept, with much of the same benefit achieved at a fraction of the effort, at the cost of losing some technical features considered less important in the market. In the case of L2TPv3, the features lost are teletraffic engineering features considered important in MPLS. However, there is no reason these features could not be re-engineered in or on top of L2TPv3 in later products. The protocol overhead of L2TPv3 is also significantly bigger than MPLS.
