= RAD Group =

Networking/Telecommunication group of companies

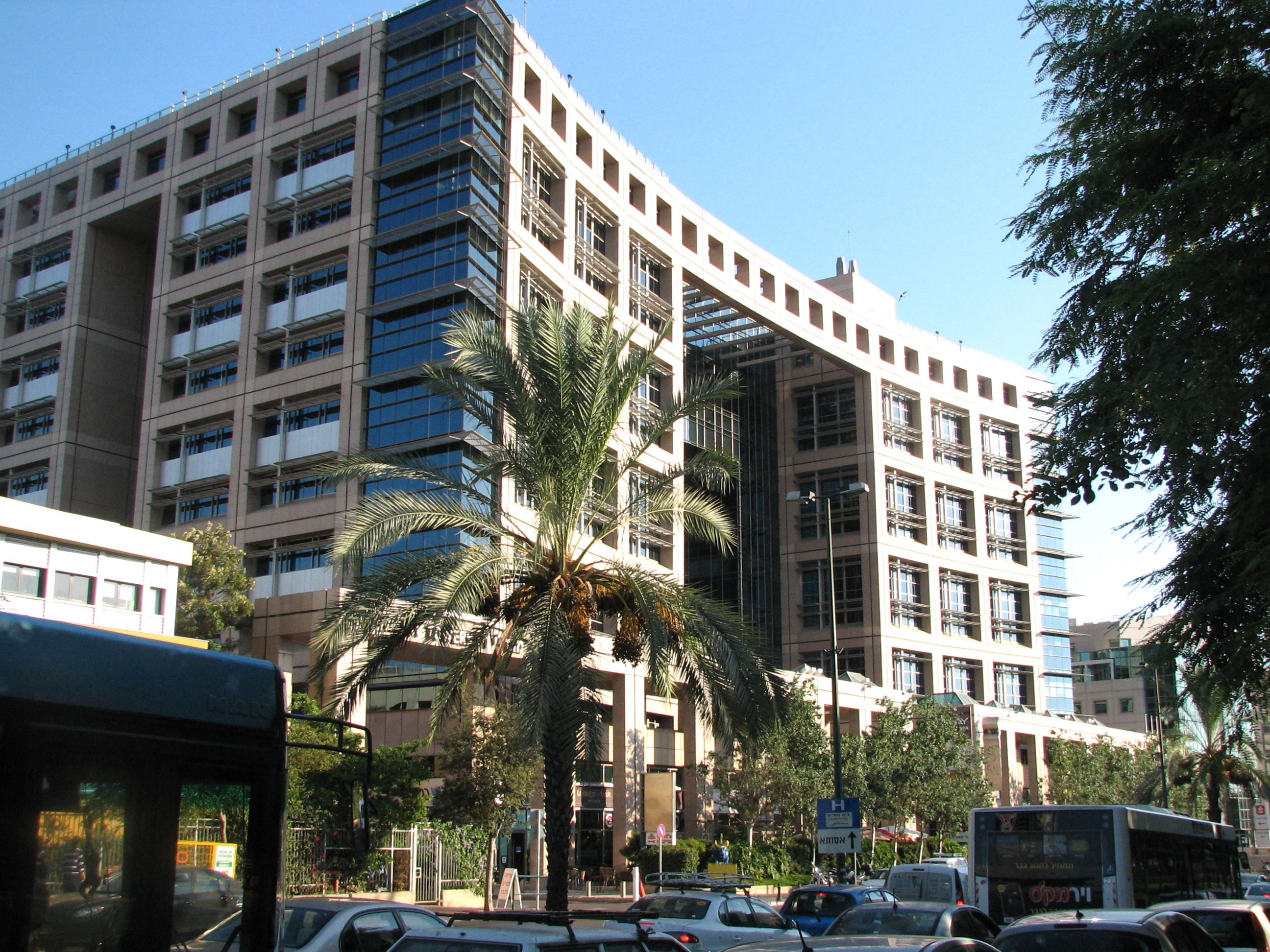
RAD Group headquarters, in the Ramat HaHayal neighborhood of Tel Aviv

RAD Group is a number of independent companies that develop, manufacture and market solutions for diverse segments of the networking and telecommunications industry. Each company operates independently, without a holding company, but is guided by the group founders under a collective strategic umbrella. Companies share technology, engage in joint marketing activities and benefit from a common management structure.

Four RAD Group companies are traded on NASDAQ in the U.S.: Ceragon Networks, Radware, RADCOM, and Silicom. The others are privately held by the Group's founders and several venture capital firms.

== History ==
The RAD Group was founded by brothers Yehuda (1942–2024) and Zohar (1949–2023) Zisapel, in Tel Aviv, Israel. Both brothers studied electrical engineering at the Technion – Israel Institute of Technology. Yehuda started his career in the 1960s working for Motorola Israel but in 1973 decided to start his own business importing and distributing computer networking equipment, a company called Bitcom. Later Yehuda parted company with his initial business partner and started a new company, Bynet. The company's main business was distributing Codex Corporation products, and the company soon became a market leader in Israel. In 1977 Codex Corporation was acquired by Motorola, but due to its success Bynet maintain the distribution rights for its products; however in 1981 Motorola decided not to renew the distribution agreement with Bynet, and Codex Corporation began to sell in Israel directly.

The experience of losing the distribution rights of Codex made Yehuda realize that his business should never rely on one product line, and in 1981 he asked his brother, Zohar, to join him at Bynet to start working on the development of their products. They started a new company in a corner of the Bynet offices and gave it the name RAD Data Communications, RAD being the acronym of Research And Development.

RAD's first successful product was a miniature (by 1980s standards) computer modem that did not require a separate power source, operating instead by utilizing power flowing over the telephone line. By 1985, RAD's annual revenues reached US$5.5 million. RAD Data Communications is now the largest company in the RAD Group.

In 1985, RAD provided initial funding and support to entrepreneur Benny Hanigal to start LANNET Data Communications, which developed a pioneering Ethernet switch, one of the first to offer Ethernet switching over simple twisted pair telephone cables rather than expensive coaxial cables. In 1991 LANNET had an initial public offering on NASDAQ, but in 1995, as their market was consolidating, it was decided to merge with Madge Networks, in a deal valuing LANNET at $300 million USD.

By the end of 1995, the merged Madge-LANNET had 1,400 employees and achieved revenues of more than $400 million, but throughout 1996-1997 there were disagreements about strategy. Benny Hanigal left the company and joined the Israeli Venture Capital fund Star Ventures. In late 1997 Madge Networks spun off its Ethernet division into a separate subsidiary, once again named LANNET, and then sold it to Lucent Technologies for $117 million in July 1998.

During the 1990s the RAD Group was involved in establishing 12 different technology companies. Some became publicly listed companies on NASDAQ and some were later sold to other companies. The group typically has a similar approach for starting new ventures: a business idea of an entrepreneur (an existing company employee or an outsider) or from the company's management team forms the basis of a start-up. Initial funding is provided by the company together with other venture capital funds. In this way companies such as: RADCOM was established in 1990 and received funding from Star Venture and Pitango Venture Capital funds and Radvision in 1992, which was founded by Ami Amir and Eli Doron and received external funding from Evergreen and Clal venture capital funds, as well as from Siemens.

== Importance ==
According to research conducted by Prof. Shmuel Ellis, Chair of the Management Department at Tel Aviv University's Faculty of Management, together with Prof. Israel Drori of the School of Business Administration at the College of Management Academic Studies and Prof. Zur Shapira, Chair of the Management and Organizations Department at New York University, the RAD Group has been "the most fertile ground" for creating Israeli entrepreneurs, having produced 56 "serial entrepreneurs" who established more than one start-up each. RAD Group "graduates" were responsible for the establishment of a total of 111 significant hi-tech initiatives.

== Awards and recognition ==
RAD Group companies have won many awards including from Business Red Herring, the Fierce Innovation Cybersecurity Award, the Internet Telephony Conference Best-in-Show Award, the Network Virtualization Industry Award, Telecom Asia's Reader's Choice Award, multiple Carrier Ethernet Awards, and Editor's Choice Awards from industry magazines such as Network Computing.

In 2005, RAD Group was ranked 14 on the list of "The 29 Best Business Ideas in the World" by Business 2.0 magazine in August 2005.

== RAD Group Companies ==
The RAD Group currently consists of 10 companies, four of which are traded on the Nasdaq stock market. The group's total revenue in 2016 was $1.328 billion.

- Bynet - system integrator, established 1973
- RAD Data Communications - access solutions for carriers and corporate networks, established 1981
- Silicom Connectivity Solutions - hi-end adapters for servers and security appliances, established 1987
- RADCOM - providers of monitoring, analysis and troubleshooting systems for Next Generation networks, established 1991
- Ceragon Networks - wireless broadband, established 1996 (as Giganet)
- Radware - intelligent application switching, established 1997
- Radwin - broadband wireless solutions, established 1997
- PacketLight Networks - DWDM/OTN solutions for fiber optic networks and data center interconnect, transporting high rate data, storage, video, and voice applications, with optional Layer-1 encryption, established 2000
- Radiflow - cyber-security solutions for ICS/SCADA, established 2009
- SecurityDAM - detection and mitigation of Distributed Denial of Service (DDoS) attacks, established 2012

== Former members ==
Former members of the RAD Group include:

- LANNET - sold to Madge Networks in 1995 and then to Lucent in 1998
- RADLINX - sold to VocalTec in 1998
- Armon Networking - sold to Bay Networks in 1996
- RADNET - sold to Siemens AG and Newbridge Networks in 1997
- RADLAN - sold to Marvell in 2003
- RND - sold to USR Electronics in 2003
- RiT Technologies - sold to Stis Coman Corporation in 2008
- SANRAD - sold to OCZ Technology in 2012
- Radvision - sold to Avaya in 2012
- RadView Software

== See also ==
- List of Israeli companies quoted on the Nasdaq
