= Robert Madge (businessman) =

British entrepreneur and technologist

Robert Hylton Madge (born 2 April 1952) is a British entrepreneur and technologist.

== Career ==
In the 1980s, he founded and was chairman of Madge Networks, a pioneer of high speed networking technology.

Once he was the President of IDTrack, a European Association for identification and traceability of goods based on technologies such as RFID. He was also the founder of Olzet, a provider of services associated with the implementation of RFID solutions in the food industry.

He was President of the European Association for Secure Identification.
