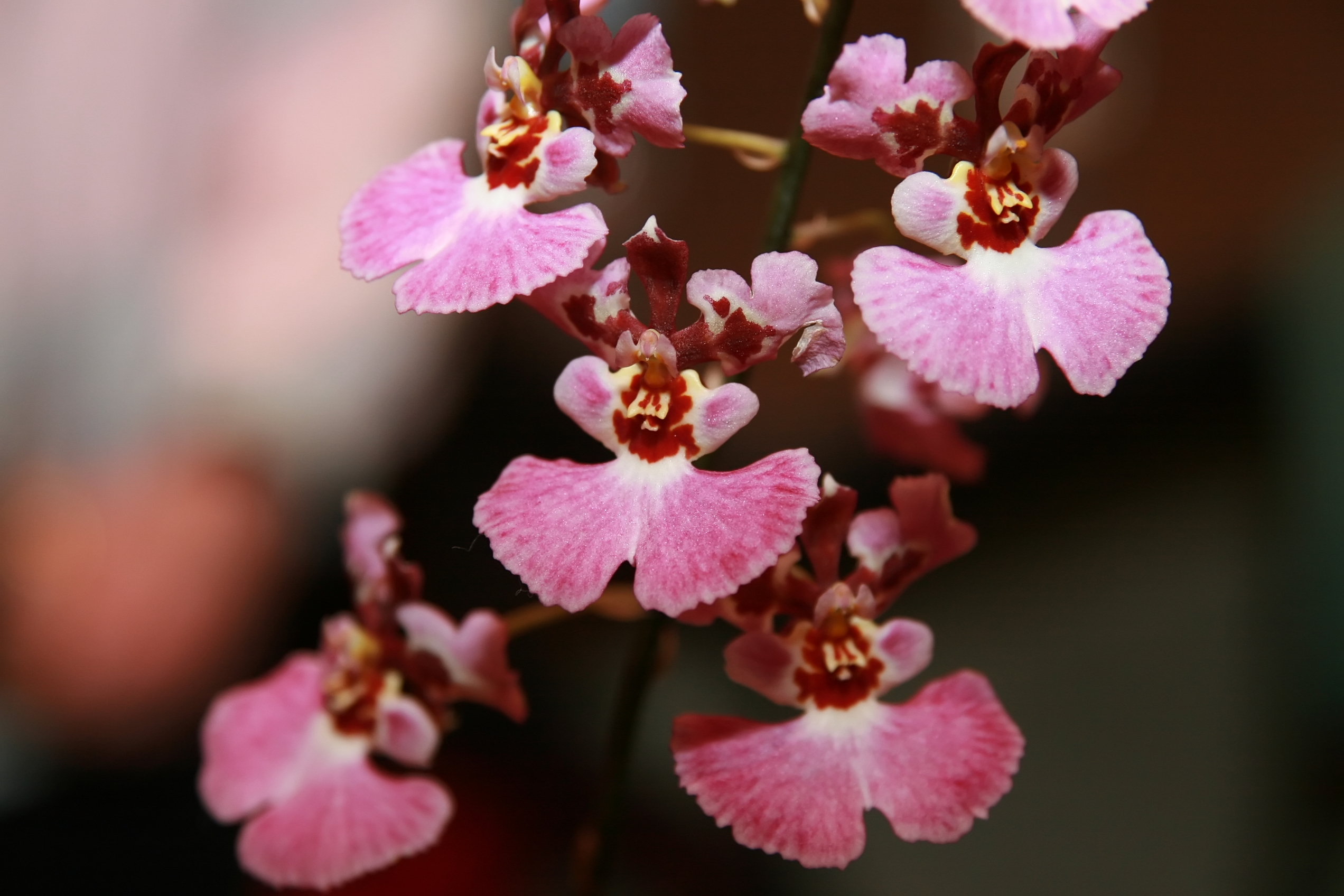

Scientific classification
- Kingdom: Plantae
- Clade: Tracheophytes
- Clade: Angiosperms
- Clade: Monocots
- Order: Asparagales
- Family: Orchidaceae
- Subfamily: Epidendroideae
- Tribe: Cymbidieae
- Subtribe: Oncidiinae
- Genus: × Rodricidium hort.

= × Rodricidium =

Genus of plants

× Rodricidium, abbreviated as Rdcm. in the horticultural trade, is the nothogenus comprising intergeneric hybrids of the two orchid genera Oncidium and Rodriguezia (Onc. × Rdza.).
