= Cormorant Network =

The Cormorant Communications Network is a military wide area communications network implemented by the British Army sometime around 2000. It has also been adopted by certain Royal Air Force units in limited deployments.

== Role ==
The network provides end-to-end wide area communications using the same Asynchronous Transfer Mode protocol that underpins many late-20th Century civilian telecommunications networks. It supports voice traffic routed over IP (although this is distinct from Internet VoIP) and can also support IPv4 and IPv6 BTDS traffic.

== Withdrawal From Service ==
On 10 September 2009 the MoD announced that the system was to be withdrawn from service in Afghanistan, and the trunk radio elements replaced with a far simpler and less secure bearer radio system from Israeli company Radwin. This reflected the significantly reduced operational requirements, with much of Cormorant's mandatory functionality being discarded in favour of a higher bandwidth radio, which in turn reflected the huge growth in data requirements since Cormorant was originally specified.
