= Statue of Rocky Colavito =

Statue in Cleveland, Ohio, U.S.

- Artist: David Deming
- Subject: Rocky Colavito
- Location: Cleveland, Ohio, U.S.; 41.5085024°N 81.5994576°W

A statue of Rocky Colavito was unveiled in Tony Brush Park, in the Little Italy neighborhood of Cleveland, Ohio, in 2021. The statue was sculpted by David Deming and cast in bronze.
