= USS Cormorant (MHC-57) =

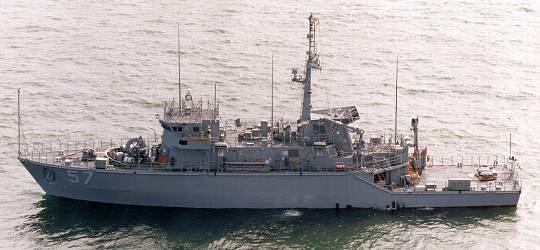
- USS Cormorant

History

United States
- Name: USS Cormorant
- Namesake: Cormorant
- Awarded: 29 March 1991
- Builder: Avondale Shipyards
- Laid down: 4 October 1993
- Launched: 21 October 1995
- Acquired: 3 January 1997
- Commissioned: 12 April 1997
- Decommissioned: 01 December 2007
- Stricken: 01 December 2007
- Fate: Sold by U.S. General Services Administration for scrap, 08 May 2014
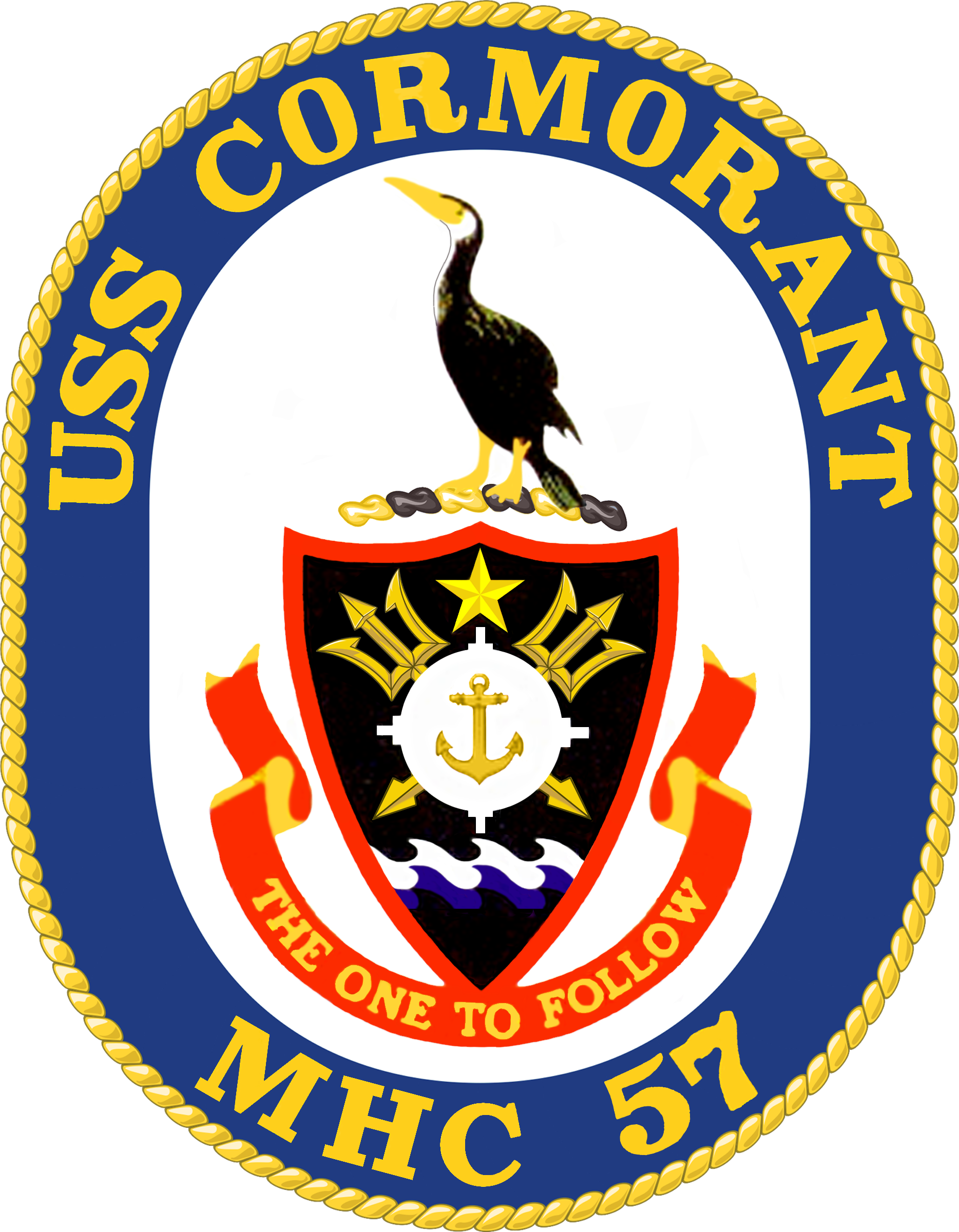
- Badge

General characteristics
- Class & type: Osprey-class coastal minehunter
- Displacement: 870 tons (light) 957 tons (full)
- Length: 188 ft (57 m)
- Beam: 38 ft (12 m)
- Draft: 11 ft (3.4 m)
- Propulsion: Two diesels (800 hp each)
- Speed: 12 knots (22 km/h; 14 mph)
- Complement: Officers: 5 Enlisted: 46
- Armament: Mine neutralization system & two .50 cal (12.7 mm) machine guns

USS Cormorant (MHC-57) is the seventh ship of Osprey-class coastal minehunters.

== Current status ==
She was transferred to a Naval Inactive Ships Storage Facility in Texas to await transfer under Foreign Military Sales. In September 2010, the U.S. Senate had approved the sale of the ship to India along with USS Kingfisher (MHC-56). This sale never happened. She was stricken from the Navy list on 1 December 2007. She was sold by U.S. General Services Administration for scrap on 8 May 2014.
