= Radcom Ltd. =

RADCOM Ltd.
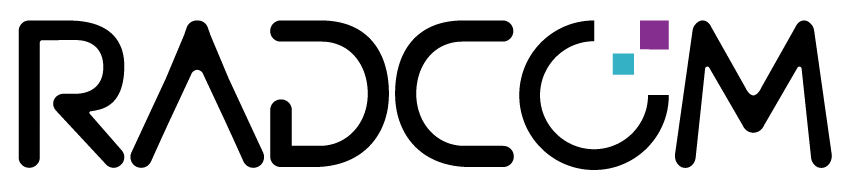
- Company type: Public
- Traded as: Nasdaq: RDCM
- Industry: Telecommunications
- Founded: 1991; 35 years ago
- Headquarters: Tel Aviv, Israel
- Number of locations: New Jersey, U.S. Sao Paulo, Brazil New Delhi, India
- Key people: Benny Eppstein (CEO)
- Revenue: ▲US$ 51.6 million (2023)
- Operating income: ▲US$ (0.7) million (2023)
- Net income: ▲US$ 3.7 million (2023)
- Number of employees: 295
- Website: radcom.com

RADCOM Ltd. is a provider of quality monitoring and service assurance software for telecommunications carriers, founded in 1991. RADCOM's U.S. headquarters is in Paramus, New Jersey and its international headquarters is in Tel Aviv, Israel. RADCOM is a member of the RAD Group of companies. The company is traded on the Nasdaq exchange.

== Products ==
RADCOM provides service assurance and customer experience management for telecom operators and communications service providers. RADCOM provides software for telecommunications carriers to carry out customer experience monitoring and to manage their networks and services. RADCOM offers software for network function virtualization (NFV). In August 2020, RADCOM announced support for 5G networks.

== History ==
RADCOM started as an internal project within the RAD Group in 1985 and incorporated in 1991. The company received initial funding from Star Venture, Evergreen and Pitango Venture Capital funds.

In September 1997, the company had an initial public offering on Nasdaq. Net proceeds to the company were approximately $20.2 million.
