= Pseudowire =

Point-to-point connection over a packet-switched network

In computer networking and telecommunications, a pseudowire (or pseudo-wire) is an emulation of a point-to-point connection over a packet-switched network (PSN).

The pseudowire emulates the operation of a "transparent wire" carrying the service, but it is realized that this emulation will rarely be perfect. The service being carried over the "wire" may be Asynchronous Transfer Mode (ATM), Frame Relay, Ethernet or time-division multiplexing (TDM) while the packet network may be Multiprotocol Label Switching (MPLS), Internet Protocol (IPv4 or IPv6), or Layer 2 Tunneling Protocol Version 3 (L2TPv3).

The first pseudowire specifications were the Martini draft for ATM pseudowires, and the TDMoIP draft for transport of E1/T1 over IP.

In 2001, the Internet Engineering Task Force (IETF) set up the PWE3 working group, which was chartered to develop an architecture for service provider edge-to-edge pseudowires, and service-specific documents detailing the encapsulation techniques. Other standardization forums, including the International Telecommunication Union (ITU) and the MFA Forum, are also active in producing standards and implementation agreements for pseudowires.

Starting from 2006, telecom operators like BellSouth, Supercomm, AT&T, and Verizon began to invest more into pseudowire technology, pointing out its advantages to Ethernet in particular. Pseudowires tie services together across multiple transport technologies, including Ethernet over SONET, WDM, GPON, DSL, and WiMax. Over the next decade, the technology became mainstream.

In 2017 Cisco published a comprehensive document explaining the concept, troubleshooting, and configuration details for all Cisco equipment pieces, which supported pseudowire. Today, the service is provided by a number of telecommunication companies like Axerra Networks, MCI Inc, or by Infrastructure as a service providers like Voxility.

There are now many pseudowire standards, the most important of which are IETF RFCs as well as ITU-T Recommendations:

== RFCs ==
- RFC 3985 Pseudo Wire Emulation Edge-to-Edge (PWE3) Architecture.
- RFC 4385 Pseudowire Emulation Edge-to-Edge (PWE3) Control Word for Use over an MPLS PSN
- RFC 4448 Encapsulation Methods for Transport of Ethernet over MPLS Networks
- RFC 4447 Pseudowire Setup and Maintenance - Using the Label Distribution Protocol (LDP)
- RFC 4553 Structure-Agnostic Time Division Multiplexing (TDM) over Packet (SAToP)
- RFC 4623 Pseudowire Emulation Edge-to-Edge (PWE3) Fragmentation and Reassembly
- RFC 4618 Encapsulation Methods for Transport of PPP/High-Level Data Link Control (HDLC) over MPLS Networks
- RFC 4619 Encapsulation Methods for Transport of Frame Relay over Multiprotocol Label Switching (MPLS) Networks
- RFC 4720 Pseudowire Emulation Edge-to-Edge (PWE3) Frame Check Sequence Retention
- RFC 4717 Encapsulation Methods for Transport of Asynchronous Transfer Mode (ATM) over MPLS Networks
- RFC 4816 Pseudowire Emulation Edge-to-Edge (PWE3) Asynchronous Transfer Mode (ATM) Transparent Cell Transport Service
- RFC 4842 Synchronous Optical Network/Synchronous Digital Hierarchy (SONET/SDH) Circuit Emulation over Packet (CEP)
- RFC 5087 Time Division Multiplexing over IP (TDMoIP)
- RFC 5086 Structure-Aware Time Division Multiplexed (TDM) Circuit Emulation Service over Packet Switched Network (CESoPSN)
- RFC 5085 Pseudowire Virtual Circuit Connectivity Verification (VCCV): A Control Channel for Pseudowires
- RFC 5287 Control Protocol Extensions for the Setup of Time-Division Multiplexing (TDM) Pseudowires in MPLS Networks

== ITU-T Recommendations ==
- Y.1411 ATM pseudowires
- Y.1412 AAL5 pseudowires
- Y.1413 TDM pseudowires
- Y.1414 Voice Services pseudowires
- Y.1415 Ethernet pseudowires
- Y.1418 Pseudowire Layer Networks
- Y.1452 Voice Services over IP
- Y.1453 TDM over IP
- X.84 Frame Relay pseudowires

== See also ==
- Encapsulation (networking)
- TDMoIP
