= List of The Thinker sculptures =

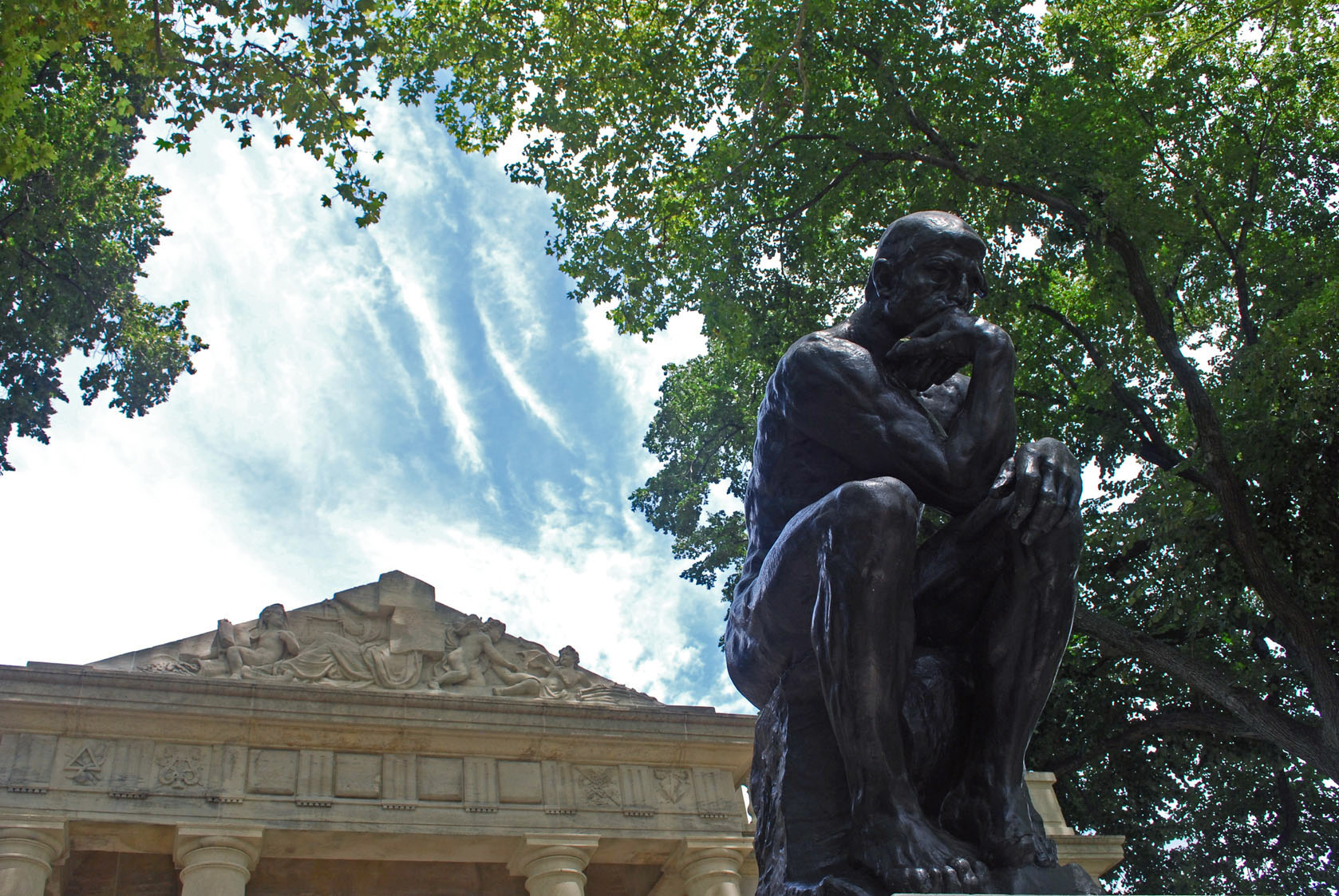
The Thinker in front of the Rodin Museum in Philadelphia

This is a list of The Thinker sculptures made by Auguste Rodin. The Thinker, originally a part of Rodin's The Gates of Hell, exists in several versions. The original size and the later monumental size versions were both created by Rodin, and the most valuable versions are those created under his supervision. There was also a limited edition of 25 copies made from the original plaster mold by the Musée Rodin after Rodin's death.

The Thinker exists as bronze casts, exhibition plaster casts (some were painted to look like bronze patina), and original production plasters, which some consider art objects today.

== Copies of The Thinker made during Rodin's lifetime ==
| Location | Image | Size | Material | Date | Notes | References |
|---|---|---|---|---|---|---|
| National Gallery of Victoria, Melbourne | | Original | Bronze | 1884 | Earliest bronze casting, has Florentine cap | |
| Musée d'Art et d'Histoire, Geneva | | Original | Bronze | 1896 | | |
| National Gallery of Art, Washington D.C. | | Original | Bronze | 1901 | | |
| Panthéon, Latin Quarter, Paris (destroyed) | | Monumental | Plaster, bronze-tinted | 1904 | Earliest monumental. The statue was vandalized and later scrapped. | |
| The Burrell Collection | A statue | Original | Bronze | 1902 | Bought by Mr. Burrell in 1922. Many fingerprints and marks were left by the sculptor. | |
| University of Louisville | A statue | Monumental | Bronze | 1903 | First casting by A. A. Hébrard, lost wax technique, displayed at Louisiana Purchase Exposition | |
| Commissioned by Max Linde in 1903. Today Detroit Institute of Arts | | Monumental | Bronze | 1903 | First casting by Alexis Rudier, sand casting, four days younger than Louisville copy, publicly displayed at Leipzig and Berlin | |
| Metropolitan Museum, New York | | Monumental | Plaster, bronze-tinted | 1904 | Sent to the Louisiana Purchase Exhibition in St. Louis to replace the bronze version | |
| Musée Rodin, Paris | | Monumental | Bronze | 1904 | Installed outside Paris Panthéon in 1906, moved to Musée Rodin garden in 1922 | |
| Ny Carlsberg Glyptotek | | Monumental | Bronze | 1904 | the "third Hébrard copy" | |
| Staatliche Kunstsammlungen Dresden | | Monumental | Plaster | 1904 | acquired by museum in October 1904 | |
| National Museum, Poznań | | Monumental | Plaster | 1904 | acquired in January 1905 | |
| Strasbourg Museum of Modern and Contemporary Art | | Monumental | Plaster | 1904 | purchased from the artist in 1907 | |
| Legion of Honor, San Francisco | | Monumental | Bronze | 1904 | Alexis Rudier cast, purchased in 1915, donated to San Francisco in 1922 | |
| Private collection, Clark Art Institute, Williamstown, Massachusetts | | Original | Bronze | 1906 | made for Ralph Pulitzer, sold for $15.3 million in 2013 | |
| Laeken Cemetery, Brussels | A statue | Monumental | Bronze | 1906 | Alexis Rudier cast, installed on the grave of Jef Dillen in 1927 | |
| Ca' Pesaro, Venice | | Monumental | Plaster, bronze-tinted | 1907 | purchased at the 1907 Biennale | |
| Congressional Plaza, Buenos Aires | | Monumental | Bronze | 1907 | Purchased by the museum director to Auguste Rodin, one of the three sculptures cast in the original mold and signed by him | |
| Waldemarsudde, Sweden | | Monumental | Bronze | 1908 | Alexis Rudier cast, for Prince Eugen of Norway and Sweden | |
| Private collection | | Original | Bronze | 1916 | sold for $11.8 million in 2010 | |
| Rodin's tomb, Meudon | | Monumental | Bronze | 1916 | Alexis Rudier cast, placed at the grave when his wife died | |
| Cleveland Museum of Art | A statue | Monumental | Bronze | 1916 | Alexis Rudier cast, purchased 1916, damaged in 1970 and remains unrepaired. According to police, the perpetrators were a faction of the Weathermen, possibly the same individuals killed in a bomb-making accident in New York City, although police never charged anyone in the bombing. | |
| Musée Rodin at Meudon | | Monumental | Plaster, bronze-tinted | 1916 | the museum has several plaster casts in different sizes and of different ages | |

== Later casts ==
=== Europe ===
- France
  - Saint-Paul de Vence
- Germany
  - Alte Nationalgalerie, Berlin
  - Sächsisches Landesgymnasium Sankt Afra zu Meißen, Meissen
  - Kunsthalle Bielefeld, Bielefeld
- Netherlands
  - Apollolaan, in front of the Amsterdam Hilton Hotel
  - Singer Laren, Laren (badly damaged by thieves in 2007; restored and re-exhibited in 2010)
- Norway
  - National Gallery of Norway, Oslo
- Russia
  - Pushkin Museum of Fine Arts, Moscow
- Serbia
  - University of Arts, Belgrade
- Switzerland
  - Kunsthaus Zürich, Zürich
- Turkey
  - Bakırköy Psychiatric Hospital, Istanbul
- United Kingdom
  - Burrell Collection (Pollok House), Glasgow, Scotland
- Vatican City
  - Vatican Museums, Collection of Modern Religious Art

=== North America ===
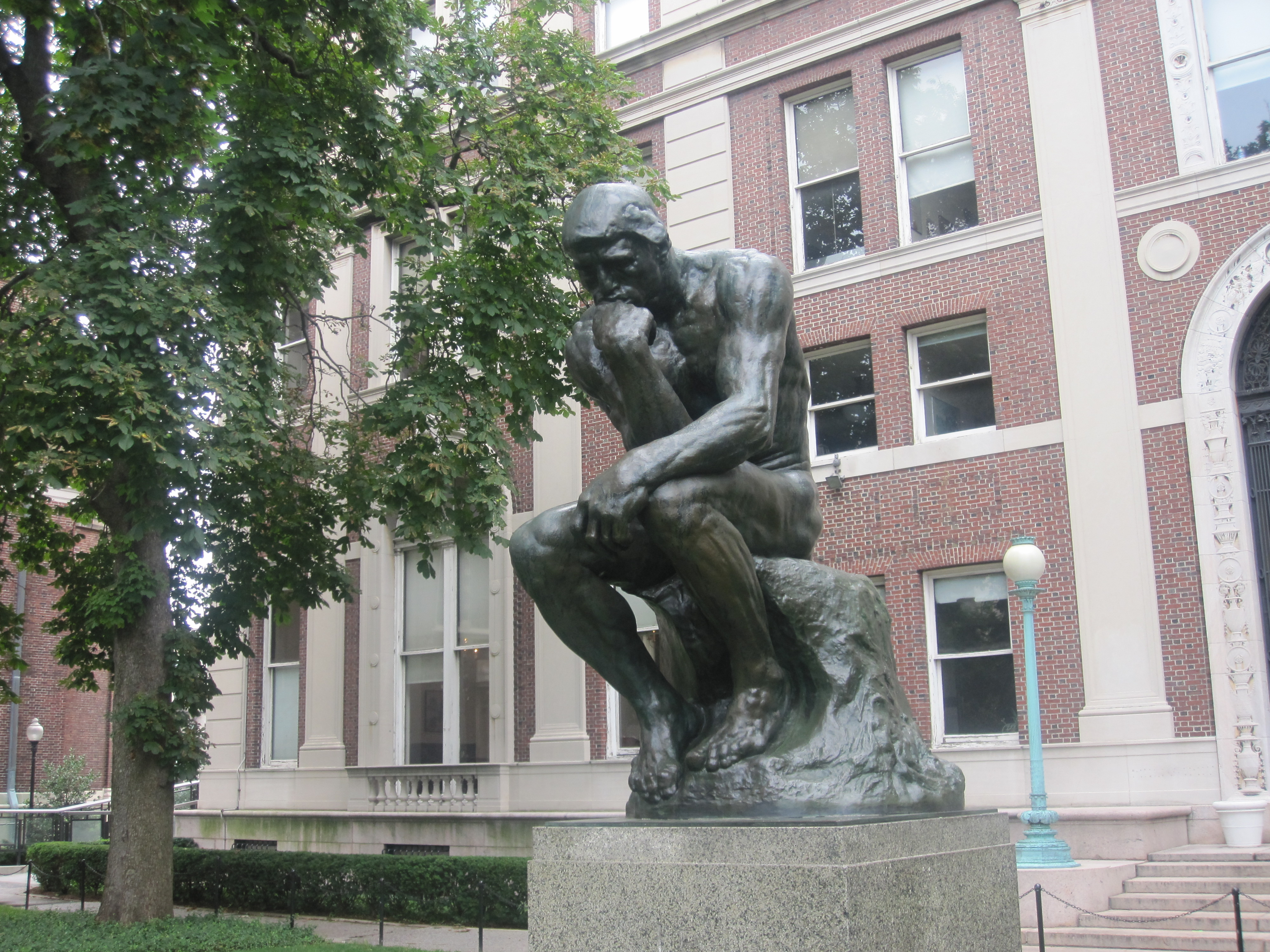
The Thinker in front of Philosophy Hall at Columbia University

- Canada
  - Montreal Museum of Fine Art, Montreal
  - Art Gallery of Ontario, Toronto
  - MacLaren Art Centre, Barrie
- Mexico
  - Museo Soumaya, Mexico City
- Costa Rica
  - Compañía Nacional de la Danza
- United States
  - Cantor Fitzgerald offices in World Trade Center, New York City (survived the September 11 attacks; missing afterwards)
  - Columbia University, New York City
  - Maryhill Museum of Art, Goldendale
  - Bal Harbour Shops, Miami
  - Martin Lawrence Gallery, Las Vegas
  - University of Louisville, Louisville
  - Baltimore Museum of Art, Baltimore
  - Rodin Museum, Philadelphia
  - Nelson-Atkins Museum of Art, Kansas City
  - Norton Simon Museum, Pasadena
  - North Carolina Museum of Art, Raleigh
  - Iris & B. Gerald Cantor Center for Visual Arts, Stanford University, Stanford
  - Bodies: The Exhibition, originally Tampa (travelling; a recreation made from a plastinated human corpse posed like the original sculpture)
- Detroit Institute of Arts, Detroit, Michigan

=== South America ===
- Argentina
  - Museum of Modern Art, Buenos Aires
- Brazil
  - Ricardo Brennand Institute, Recife
  - Lily Marinho collection, Rio de Janeiro
- Chile
  - Borde Costero, Viña del Mar

=== Asia ===
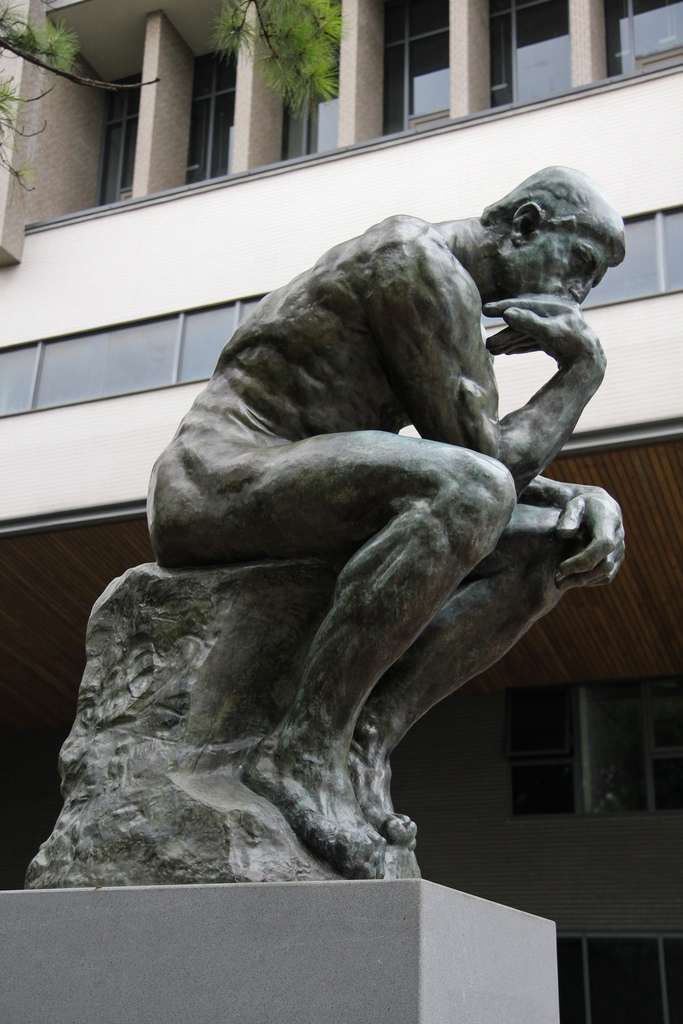
The Thinker in NTHU, Taiwan

- China
  - China Central Academy of Fine Arts library, Beijing
  - Guangzhou Opera House, Guangzhou
  - Shanghai Library, Shanghai
  - Changchun World Sculpture Park, Changchun
- India
  - Sri Venkateswara University, Tirupati
  - Thinkers Park at Jawaharlal Institute of Postgraduate Medical Education and Research, Pondicherry
  - Nalsar University of Law, Shamirpet
- Indonesia
  - Kolese Kanisius, Jakarta
- Israel
  - RAD Data Communications, Tel Aviv
- Japan
  - The National Museum of Western Art, Tokyo
  - Kyoto National Museum, Kyoto
  - Shizuoka Prefectural Museum of Art, Shizuoka
- Singapore
  - OUE Bayfront, Marina Bay
  - Resorts World Sentosa, Sentosa Island
- South Korea
  - Beartree Park, Sejong City
- Taiwan
  - Chimei Museum, Tainan
  - Asia University, Taichung
  - National Tsing Hua University, Hsinchu
- Vietnam
  - FPT University, Danang campus
  - FPT University, Cantho campus
  - FPT University, Quynhon campus

== See also ==
- List of sculptures by Auguste Rodin
