= HMS Cormorant =

Eleven ships and a shore establishment of the Royal Navy have borne the name HMS Cormorant, after the seabird, the cormorant:

- HMS Cormorant (1757) was a 18-gun ship sloop, previously the French Marchault. She was purchased on 28 April 1757, was converted into a fireship in 1758 and was sold in 1762.
- HMS Cormorant (1776) was a 14-gun sloop launched in 1776. She may have been at the Siege of Pondicherry (1778). The French captured her in 1781 off Charleston, South Carolina and took her into service as Cormoran. She apparently accompanied Admiral de Grasse's fleet to the Chesapeake, however, her subsequent fate is unknown.
- HMS Cormorant (1781) was a 12-gun brig-sloop, previously the American Rattlesnake. She was captured in 1781, renamed HMS Rattlesnake in 1783, and sold in 1786.
- HMS Cormorant (1794) was an 18-gun Cormorant-class ship-sloop launched in 1794 and destroyed by an accidental explosion in 1796.
- HMS Cormorant was a 20-gun sixth rate, launched in 1795, previously the name ship for the Etna class of French corvettes. She was captured in 1796 and wrecked in 1800.
- HMS Cormorant (1804) was a 16-gun sloop, formerly the civilian Blenheim. She was purchased in 1804, converted to a storeship in 1808 and sold in 1817. She then returned to mercantile service as a West Indiaman under the name Blenheim. She was last seen on 10 November 1821.
- HMS Cormorant (1842) was a paddlewheel sloop launched in 1842 and broken up in 1853.
- HMS Cormorant (1856) was a screw gunvessel launched in 1856 and sunk in 1859.
- HMS Cormorant (1860) was a screw sloop launched in 1860 and sold in 1870.
- HMS Cormorant (1877) was an Osprey-class composite screw sloop launched in 1877, reduced to harbour service in 1889, renamed HMS Rooke in 1946, and broken up in 1949.
- HMS Cormorant (P256) was a patrol boat launched in 1975 as HMAFV Sunderland for the Royal Air Force. She was transferred to the Royal Navy in 1985 and was sold in 1991.

== Shore establishment ==
- HMS Cormorant II (shore establishment) was the Royal Naval Air Station at Gibraltar between 1943 and 1944.

== Other ships ==
- Cormorant II was a trawler hired by the Royal Navy between 1915 and 1919.
- Cormorant III was a drifter hired by the Royal Navy between 1915 and 1919.
- Cormorant IV was a trawler hired by the Royal Navy between 1916 and 1919.
