= OSS through Java =

OSS/J (a.k.a. OSS through Java) is a TM Forum technical program whose primary goal is to develop open interface standards (APIs) for the integration of Business Support Systems (BSS) & Operations Support System (OSS).

OSS/J addresses the concerns of Frameworx implementation stakeholders by providing open standard APIs based on the NGOSS framework, particularly the Frameworx Shared Information/Data Model (SID). Work is underway to organize the OSS/J APIs against the NGOSS Telecom Application Map (TAM).

The OSS/J APIs are multi-technology based and include Java, XML, and Web Services integration profiles. Each integration profile consists of specifications, a reference implementation, and a conformance test suite (TCK).

The OSS/J APIs are developed under the Java Community Process and can be downloaded for free from the TM Forum OSS/J web site.

== See also ==
- Networked Help Desk
