= Mobile virtual network enabler =

Provider of services for mobile virtual network operators

A mobile virtual network enabler (MVNE) is a company that provides network infrastructure and related services, such as business support system (BSS), and operation support system (OSS) to a mobile virtual network operator (MVNO). This enables MVNOs to offer services to their own customers with their own brands. The MVNE does not have a relationship with consumers, but rather is a provider of network enablement platforms and services.

MVNEs specialize in planning, implementation, and management of mobile services. The services provided by an MVNE are designed to allow the MVNO to focus primarily on marketing, sales, and customer acquisition, acting as the "ultimate middleman" to bridge the technology gap between an MNO and a brand.

== Core Services and Technical Architecture ==
The infrastructure and services an MVNE provides often constitute a turnkey solution for an MVNO, drastically reducing the high technical barriers to entry in telecommunications.

=== MVNE-Provided Components (The Platform) ===
An MVNE is responsible for providing the technical platform and business infrastructure services. This includes:

- Business Support Systems (BSS): Customer Relationship Management (CRM), billing, charging (e.g., Online Charging System/Charging Function - OCS/CHF), and product catalog management.
- Operations Support Systems (OSS): Network inventory management, fault management, performance monitoring, and service provisioning.
- Core Network Elements: Interfacing with the host network and, depending on the operational model, providing specific core network components. These can include legacy elements like a Home Location Register (HLR) or Authentication Center (AuC), and 4G/5G elements such as the Session Border Controller (SBC), Policy Control Function (PCF), and the Network Repository Function (NRF).

=== MNO-Provided Components (The Host Network) ===
The Host Network Operator (HNO) always provides the underlying physical network and critical core functions. This includes:

- Radio Access Network (RAN): The cell towers and antennas (gNodeB in 5G).
- Voice Core: The IMS (IP Multimedia Subsystem) platform for voice services.
- Key 5G Core Functions: The User Plane Function (UPF), Access and Mobility Management Function (AMF), and Authentication Server Function (AUSF), which handle connectivity and user data authentication.

== MVNO and MNO Pain Points Mitigation ==
MVNEs are critical in the value chain because they mitigate significant pain points for both the MVNO and the MNO.

- MVNO Benefits:
  - Reduced Investment: They slash high initial Capital Expenditure (Capex) and ongoing Operational Expenditure (Opex) by providing ready-made infrastructure, leading to a faster return on investment.
  - Expertise: They provide immediate access to a team of specialized telecom experts, overcoming the MVNO's typical lack of in-house telco knowledge.
  - Operational Focus: They allow the MVNO to outsource all operational complexity (SIM management, billing, provisioning) and concentrate solely on customer acquisition and brand development.
  - Economies of Scale: By hosting multiple MVNOs on a single platform, the MVNE achieves better rates and greater margins than a small MVNO could achieve alone.
- MNO Benefits:
  - Revenue and Market Share: The MNO gains new revenue streams and network market share without incurring the administrative or financial risk of launching the new brand themselves.
  - Streamlined Operations: The MVNE handles the heavy administrative processes and day-to-day operations for each individual MVNO partner, significantly reducing the MNO's internal workload.

== MVNE vs. MVNA and Regulation ==
A related type of company is a mobile virtual network aggregator (MVNA). The distinction is primarily in the business relationship and level of risk/control:

A key regulatory distinction is that the MVNE, by virtue of not offering public telecom services or having direct contact with end-users, is generally not subject to the telecom licensing requirements that apply to MVNOs and MVNAs in most markets.

While an MVNE license is generally non-existent, exceptions have been noted:

- Nigeria (Regulatory Anomaly): The Nigerian Communications Commission (NCC) introduced a license requirement for MVNEs (Tier 4 and Tier 5), which has created compliance issues for international enablers operating in the market.
- Zimbabwe: The Postal and Telecommunications Regulatory Authority of Zimbabwe (POTRAZ) has also listed MVNEs under a licensing fee structure, which some analysts believe is a confusion with the MVNA model.

Distinction Between MVNE and MVNA
Feature	Mobile Virtual Network Enabler (MVNE)	Mobile Virtual Network Aggregator (MVNA)
Primary Function	Provides technology platform and services to MVNOs.	Acts as a wholesale intermediary between MNO and smaller MVNOs.
Wholesale Risk	MVNO typically holds the contract with the MNO; MVNE is a service provider.	MVNA holds a large wholesale agreement with the MNO, then re-wholesales airtime to smaller MVNOs.
Airtime Routing	May route traffic over the MVNE's own switches (if equipped).	Often includes wholesale of an operator's airtime and routing of traffic over the MVNE's own switches.
Model Type	A telecom solution provider.	A business model and financial risk-taker.

== Market Impact and Case Studies ==
The MVNE-enabled MVNO model has led to measurable market improvements for Mobile Network Operators that have adopted it:

- E-Plus (Germany): After launching an MVNO platform, E-Plus transformed its declining profitability. The company's profit margin (EBITDA margin) rose from 24% to a high of 42% by making it easier for new MVNO partners to join its network.
- Tele2 (Russia): The operator created an "MVNO factory" with the goal of becoming the leading platform for new mobile brands. The MVNO business line saw its revenue grow by an impressive 133% year-over-year at one point.
- Surf Telecom (Brazil): As a single MVNE, Surf Telecom became a major market force. In early 2021, nearly half (36 of 82) of Brazil's licensed MVNOs were running on Surf Telecom's single platform, enabling diverse brands from the Brazilian post office to major sports teams to launch mobile services.

== Categories and Service Models ==
MVNEs can be categorized based on the scope and extent of the services and infrastructure they provide to MVNOs:

- Full-Service MVNEs: These providers offer a comprehensive, end-to-end platform covering all essential BSS/OSS functions, often including core network components like an HLR/HSS.
- Platform MVNEs: These entities focus primarily on the core OSS/BSS platform (billing, provisioning, CRM) and require the MVNO to handle certain network elements or integration steps themselves.
- Specialized Enablers: These offer only specific, niche parts of the back-office or network, such as dedicated messaging platforms or advanced data analytics.

The role of the MVNE is evolving to offer cloud-based platforms and specialize in niche areas like eSIM technology and IoT connectivity.

== Considerations for MVNOs ==
While MVNEs provide the lowest barrier to entry, using one may not be appropriate for all MVNOs. Key reasons for an MVNO to bypass an MVNE and go directly to the MNO include:

- Scale: The MVNO is large enough (usually several hundred thousand subscribers) to achieve volume efficiency and negotiate directly with the host operator.
- Negotiating Power: The brand and distribution channels are sufficiently strong to negotiate a joint-venture or direct relationship to obtain better margins.
- Existing Infrastructure: The MVNO already has access to existing telecom infrastructure, such as switches, international capacity, fixed infrastructure, or billing platforms.

An MVNE is most often utilized by Branded Resellers (Light MVNOs), which require minimal network infrastructure control, or Full MVNOs that want to outsource the heavy lifting of the BSS/OSS platforms while retaining control over key core network elements and customer experience.

== See also ==
- Business Process Framework (eTOM)
- Mobile network operator
- Mobile virtual network operator
- Operations, administration and management (OAM)
