= Service fulfillment =

Fulfillment of telecommunications services involves a series of supply chain activities responsible for assembling and making services available to subscribers. These activities delineate an operational infrastructure whose efficiency relies upon its ability to allow a communications service provider (CSP) to match the supply of services with demand in an economical way and with consistently high levels of quality and reliability.

To achieve these goals, the design of service fulfillment platforms take into consideration the following:

Data transparency
Making data available across the enterprise, regardless of source, while keeping it accurate
Process mechanization/automation
Completing more processes quicker and more successfully for better business performance
Inventory management
Understanding the status of inventory to ensure supply will be available to meet forecast (or actual) demand
Asset monetization
Driving enterprise valuation with the efficient use of assets

== Processes ==
The supply chain activities in service fulfillment involve the following processes:

- Service design and cataloging
- Integrated inventory management
- Network configuration and capacity assignment
- Service order entry, decomposition, workflow tracking and fallout resolution
- Service order activation

== Subscriber expectations ==
In addition to service assurance, service fulfillment also plays a role in managing increasing subscriber expectations and customer experience.

Customer satisfaction in the telecommunications industry stems from adequate service provisioning, value for money, loyalty and relationship management. An efficient service fulfillment platform automates service order processing to gain speed via flow-through capabilities and to reduce the service order fallout that results from manual processes. This is being recognized by CSPs as they increasingly look to their suppliers for help in achieving higher levels of automation.

== Vendors ==
Notable global service fulfillment vendors include Netcracker Technology, Comarch, Cisco, Telcordia (now part of Ericsson), TIBCO, Alcatel-Lucent (now part of Nokia), Amdocs, Oracle, Comptel (now part of Nokia), HP, Tecnotree, Arkipelago and Ericsson.

== See also ==
- Service assurance
