= Aircom International =

Defunct British telecommunication network company

- Company type: Private company
- Industry: Telecommunications industry
- Founded: May 1995; 30 years ago
- Defunct: 2013
- Fate: Acquired
- Successor: TEOCO Aircom
- Headquarters: Leatherhead, United Kingdom
- Area served: Worldwide
- Products: Telecommunication provider operation support systems
- Parent: TEOCO
- Website: teocoaircom.com

AIRCOM International was a British telecommunications management consultancy firm focusing on end-to-end network planning, sharing, outsourcing, and operation support system (OSS) optimization for IP network and cellular networks. It was acquired by TEOCO in 2013 and Teoco continued to use Aircom brand for some of the products after the acquisition.

AIRCOM worked with many wireless carriers to upgrade and optimize networks as they migrate from 2G to 3G to 4G to 5G.

== History ==
The company was founded in May 1995 and had its headquartered in Leatherhead near London, with offices in 17 countries.

On 3 December 2013 TEOCO, a telecom software firm based out of Fairfax, Virginia United States, acquired Aircom International for an undisclosed amount.

== Sources ==
- Alcatel, Ericsson seen as Verizon upgrade vendors
- Skinning the Cat of Mobile Data QoS
- The Power of Going Green
- Will networks get choked?
