= Network Test Automation Forum =

- Established: June 2010
- Type: Nonprofit international industry alliance
- Headquarters: 48377 Fremont Blvd., Suite 117 Fremont, California United States
- Region served: Worldwide
- Members: 10
- Website: ntaforum.org

The Network Test Automation Forum (NTAF), founded in 2010, is a non-profit international industry alliance made to promoting the interoperability of commercial network testing tools, and testing infrastructure, by defining and facilitating the adoption of technical specifications.

The forum is composed of leading service providers, network equipment vendors, and other networking companies that share an interest in test automation and interoperability. As of November 2012, it has 14 members.

== History ==
In 2009, 11 founding members (BreakingPoint, BT, Cisco, Fanfare, Empirix, Ericsson, EXFO, Ixia, JDSU, Spirent and Verizon) met in Chicago and expressed an interest in forming an industry alliance to bring together commercial testing vendors, test equipment vendors, and other industry experts to create interoperable testing solutions for service providers, network equipment manufacturers (NEMs), and other enterprise organizations with large network deployments. The result was the Network Test Automation Forum entity, which was set up in 2010 following the first face-to-face meeting in Montreal.

The NTAF (Network Testing Automation Framework) aims to streamline and enhance the interconnection of commercial testing tools and data communications infrastructure within the telecommunications domain.

== Objectives ==
The objectives of NTAF are:

- Build consensus and unite service providers, network equipment manufacturers, and test equipment vendors on network test automation technical specifications and interoperability.
- Create, facilitate and enable the implementation of network test automation specifications.
- Enhance market awareness of the benefits of interoperable network test automation.

== Members ==
As of July 2013, NTAF has the following members:

- Cisco
- Empirix
- Ericsson
- JDSU
- Huawei
- Juniper Networks
- MRV
- Spirent Communications
- TechMahindra
- Verizon

== Specifications ==
In June 2011, NTAF ratified two sets of specifications dealing with registration, discovery and activation of tools and defining tool harnesses.

=== TS-001: Tool Registration, Discovery and Activation ===
This specification describes an XMPP extension that allows an application or tool to register itself in a way that other interested entities can discover its existence. It also describes the mechanism by which a tool can be activated so that its automation harnesses are available for use.

=== TS-002: Tool Automation Harness ===
This specification describes an XMPP extension that allows an application or tool, with or without its own specialized man-machine user interface to expose an "automation harness" that allows that tool to be controlled and/or monitored by another tool via XMPP packet exchanges.

== Future Direction ==
The NTAF Technical Committee is currently working on draft specifications for resource and inventory management:

=== WT-003: Tool Resource ===
This working document describes an NTAF extension that allows tools to communicate resource data. It is based on the TS-001 and TS-002 specifications. Its primary focus is to support automated inventory management.

=== WT-004: Inventory ===
This working document describes an NTAF extension that supports the automatic population of inventory records with key equipment/resource parameters within a test lab environment. It is based on the TS-001 and TS002 specifications and the WT-003 proposal.
