= Simon Bowthorpe =

British businessman and dressage rider

Simon Peter St John Bowthorpe
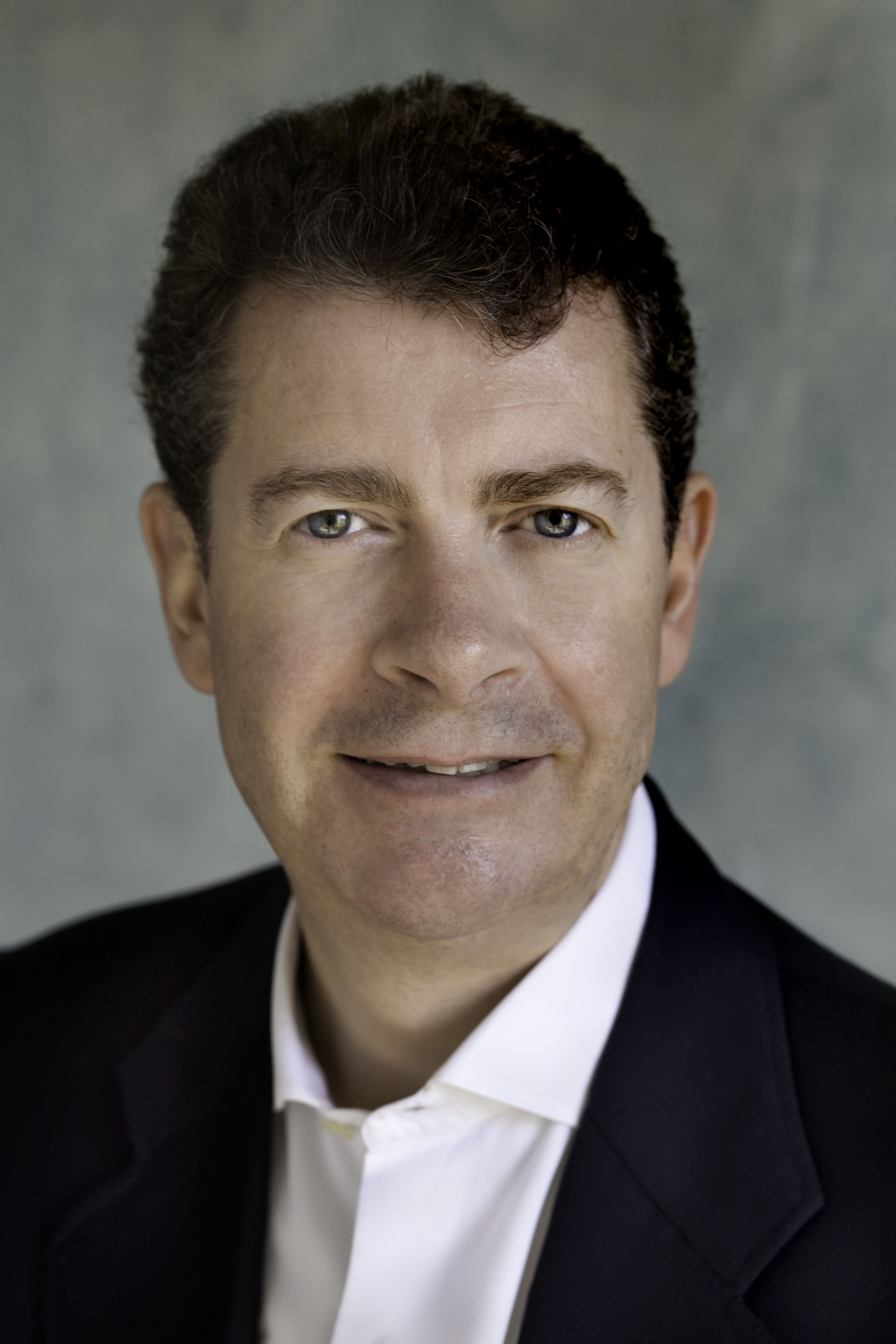
- Born: 1964 (age 61–62); London
- Education: Eton College
- Occupations: CEO; Dressage rider

Simon Peter St John Bowthorpe (born 12 September 1964) is an English chief executive and dressage rider.

== Early life and education ==
Simon Peter St. John Bowthorpe was born in 1964 in London, the grandson of industrialist Jack Bowthorpe, CBE, founder of what is now Spirent PLC. He was educated at Eton College and Schiller International University.

== Career ==
Bowthorpe began his career working at Grey Advertising and Young & Rubicam. In 1993, he founded talent agency Creative Management Group and at the end of 1994 founded Mediaplus, the first European media agency that allowed clients to buy advertising space with their own goods and services.

In 2001, Bowthorpe left the company to become a championship Spanish dressage rider, winning silver medals at the Madrid finals in 2002 and 2003. From 2003 to 2008, he was the chief executive officer of Media Force One and subsequently worked as a consultant to some of the world's largest communications groups.

Bowthorpe joined Universal McCann, a creative media agency which belongs to Interpublic Group, as General Manager of the Qatar operation in May 2013. He was promoted to Managing Director of both UM and FP7 Qatar in December of the same year. Due to the agency's rapid growth in the Qatar market, Bowthorpe concentrated on managing UM Qatar at the end of 2015 and became the Managing Director of UM Sports in 2016. He was promoted to Managing Director of UM Qatar & Kuwait & FP7/KWI in April 2017.

He is the founder of the Old Etonian Scuba Diving Society and a member of the Old Etonian Medical Society, the Bow Group, the United States Parachute Association, the Professional Association of Diving Instructors, the Anglo-Arab Horse Breeders' Society and the Royal Spanish Riding Federation.
