= MTOSI =

In telecommunications, Multi-Technology Operations System Interface (MTOSI) is a standard for implementing interfaces between OSSs. Service providers (carriers) use multiple Operational Support Systems (OSS) to manage complex networks. Since the various parts of the network must interact, so must the OSSs. It is standardized by the TeleManagement Forum (TM Forum). The TMF Frameworx provides a set of reference models that aid in analyzing and designing next generation BSS and OSS solutions that may utilize the MTOSI interface specifications.

== Description ==
A visual representation of the TMF MTOSI offered SOA Service Candidates is shown in the figure.

The MTOSI specifications are produced by the TM Forum MToP program.

MTOSI standard is a unified open interface that can be used among multiple types of management systems to provide network and service management. MTOSI standard covers all communication technologies (from layer 1, e.g., SONET/SDH, through higher layer technologies such as VoIP).

MTOSI's supported scenarios include resource trouble and performance management between operations systems, along with managed resource inventory and resource provisioning, which allow inventory and discovery systems to exchange information about network resources and allow those resources to be created, modified or deleted across systems.

MTOSI facilitates application-to-application inter-working, reduces time to deployment, and lowers the cost of ownership of systems.

Figure 1

Current management and support system implementations employ diverse middleware technologies, a reality that is not likely to change in the immediate future. To be widely adopted, MTOSI cannot mandate specific middleware technologies for its implementation. Therefore, the MTOSI interfaces are sufficiently abstract to be middleware neutral, yet rigorous enough that vendors can map them quickly to their middleware of choice. The CCV is the common middleware required to implement MTOSI.

CCV is a middleware abstraction that allows MTOSI interfaces to be bound to different middleware technologies as needed. By exploiting the expressive power of Web Services Description Language, MTOSI interfaces are composed of logical and physical definitions.

MTOSI standard offers a number of unique business advantages (1-4) as well as advantages applicable to any well-designed and well-supported interface standard (5-8):

1. MTOSI provides a standard interface between different systems for fulfillment and assurance functionality. In effect different instances of the same interface are reused at different reference points. Benefit: Knowledge can be re-used in the design of systems
2. MTOSI uses XML (eXtended Mark-Up Language) based messaging. Benefit: XML technology is widely accepted and used technology.
3. MTOSI provides rules for versioning and for vendor extensions to the XML messages. Benefit: When MTOSI is deployed, the server and consumer application ends of the interfaces can be upgraded independently. Also, when several vendors’ equipment is deployed, the proprietary extensions are managed in a consistent manner.
4. MTOSI uses standard communication patterns to support business activities that can be implemented by a range of IT platforms and transport protocols. Benefit: The underlying platform can be changed without propagating the change to the applications.
5. MTOSI allows service providers to implement management and support systems quickly. For example, without MTOSI, each of the four EMS providers in Figure 1 would need to define and agree upon a common interface (on a pair-wise basis), build the interface and then do interoperability testing. Benefit: MTOSI lowers the time and costs needed to integrate management and support system software from different suppliers.
6. MTOSI is designed to support service provider requirements for an open systems environment. Benefit: This allows service providers to more easily deploy management and support systems from multiple vendors and to replace existing ones. This increase in choice creates a more competitive environment for service providers, allowing them to choose products that best fit their functional and financial needs.
7. MTOSI encourages system integrators to pre-integrate products that are MTOSI-compliant. Benefit: This results in lower up-front costs and faster deployment for service providers.
8. MTOSI helps carriers to avoid wholesale replacements of legacy systems and instead allows them to introduce and integrate point applications that can address new solutions and services. Benefit: Allows a service provider to preserve its investment in legacy systems while still addressing the need to manage new technologies and services.

The MTOSI standard is available for download to members of the TM Forum. Membership fees are based on corporate annual revenues.
