= Netcracker Technology =

IT solutions company for telecom industry products/services

- Logo since 2019
- Type: Subsidiary (2008)
- Industry: Information Technology; Software (Telecom)
- Genre: Business Support System (BSS); Operations Support System (OSS)
- Founded: 1993; 33 years ago in Waltham, Massachusetts
- Founder: Bonnie Ward; Michael Feinberg
- Headquarters: 95 Sawyer Road, Waltham, Massachusetts, United States
- Area served: Worldwide
- Key people: Andrew Feinberg (Chair & CEO); Kelly Thoms (CPO); Bob Titus (CTO); Frank DeTraglia (CCO)
- Products: OSS/BSS Software for CSPs
- Services: Consulting; Managed Services; Operations & Maintenance; Outsourcing; Software Delivery
- Number of employees: 8,844 (2023)
- Parent: NEC Corporation (2008 – present)
- Website: www.netcracker.com

Netcracker Technology Corporation, a wholly owned subsidiary of NEC Corporation, is an American-based multinational telecommunications technology company headquartered in Waltham, Massachusetts. The company specializes in software products and professional services for communications service providers (CSPs) and cable providers. Products and services include business support system (BSS) and operational support systems (OSS) software and services.

== History ==
Founded in 1993, the company provides full-stack OSS/BSS software and services to communications service providers. Netcracker has since expanded into cloud-native, microservices-based software, virtualization, automation, generative AI and Digital Satellite Service support software.

On October 21, 2008, NEC Corporation acquired Netcracker for about US$300 million making it a wholly owned subsidiary of NEC.

=== Acquisitions ===
Firma AVD, a company headquartered in Moscow specializing in system integration, business process engineering, and IT consulting, was acquired in 2004.

In 2011, Subex's activation business, including Subex's NetProvision, NetOptimizer, Vector products, and associated business. A year later, in May 2012, Global Information Management division of Convergys was acquired.

CoralTree Systems, a systems integrator and service provider, was purchased in 2015.

== Products and services ==
As a software engineering company, Netcracker offers network optimization for communications and operations. Globally, Netcracker provides the following products and services to more than 280 communications service provider and cable provider customers.

=== Products ===
- Cloud services
- Customer Engagement (customer experience and service-related transitions)
- Digital OSS/BSS

=== Managed services ===
- Support and maintenance
- Cloud Operations
- Business Process outsourcing

=== Professional services ===
- Business & Technology Consulting
- End-to-End Program Delivery
- DevOps Enablement
- Security services
- Training Services

=== Patents ===
A search of patents where Netcracker Technology Corporation is the "assignee" reveals the company holds several patents, including:

Patents Held
Patent #	Date Applied	Date Granted	Title	Anticipated Expiration
US11847112B2	April 18, 2022	December 19, 2023	Declarative and unified data transition	(Pending)
US20220292555A1	April 4, 2022	September 15, 2022	Systems and methods for generating and presenting an electronic bill in a bill timeline view	(Pending)
US10547497B1	December 30, 2016	January 28, 2020	Methods and systems for providing predictive rating using a buffer	July 22, 2037
US10827079B1	December 30, 2016	November 3, 2020	Methods and systems for reducing data traffic flow between a network and an online charging system	July 29, 2037
US11308072B2	June 17, 2016	April 19, 2022	Declarative and unified data transition	November 9, 2029
US10504128B2	March 28, 2016	December 10, 2019	Systems and methods for improved billing and ordering	July 17, 2031
US8688410B2	March 31, 2011	April 1, 2014	Cable management and inventory enhancement	May 12, 2032
US8897174B2	September 18, 2009	November 25, 2014	Network configuration management	July 11, 2030
