= DRDO Sports Complex metro station =

Upcoming Namma Metro station under Blue Line

Bagmane Developers - DRDO Sports Complex
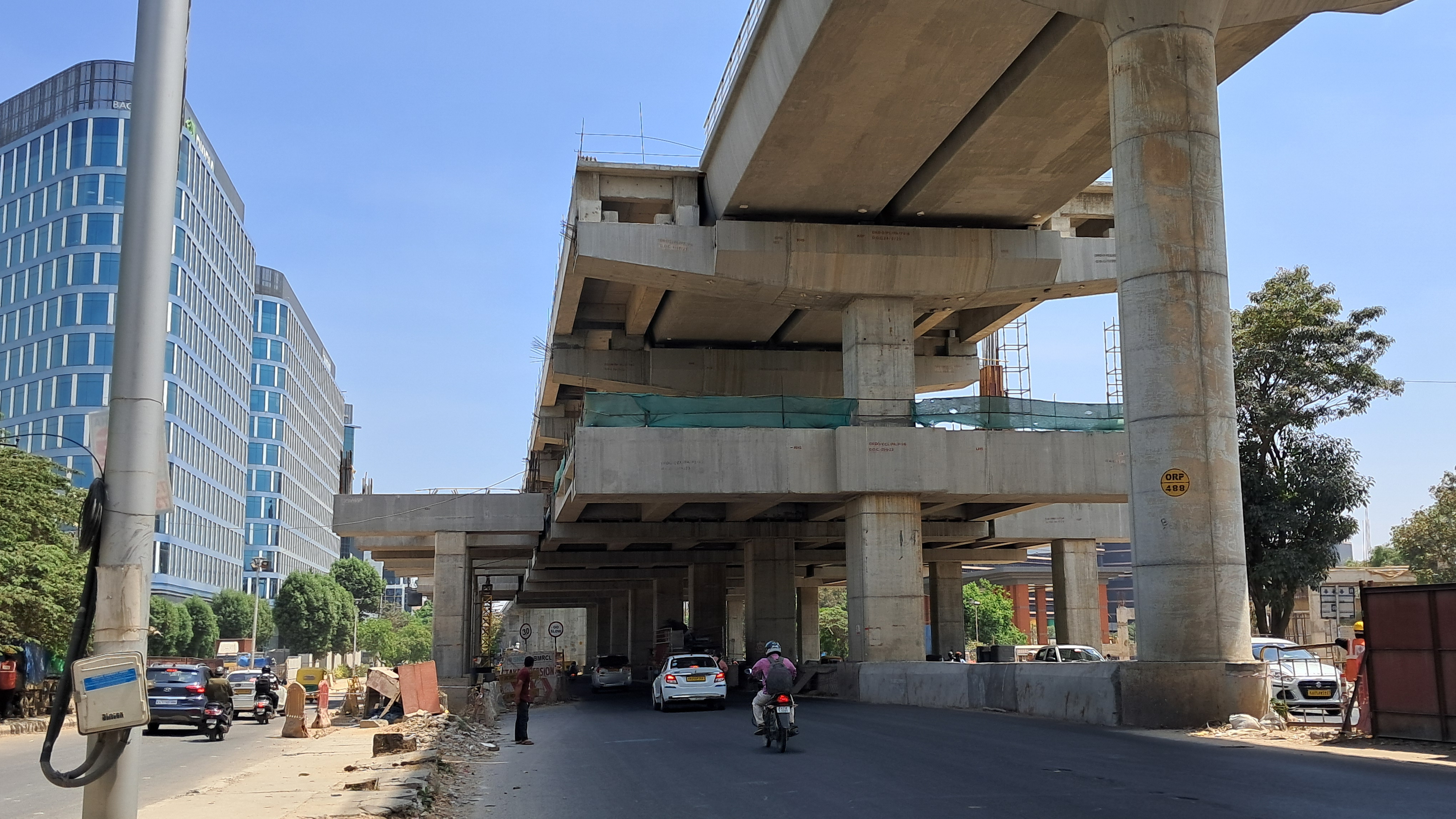
- Construction of this metro station as of March 2025 under Phase 2A of Blue Line of Namma Metro

General information
- Location: NH 44, Laxmi Sagar Layout, Mahadevapura, Bengaluru, Karnataka 560048
- Coordinates: 12.98589°N 77.69083°E
- System: Namma Metro station
- Owner: Bangalore Metro Rail Corporation Ltd (BMRCL)
- Operator: Namma Metro
- Line: Blue Line
- Platforms: Side platform (TBC); Platform-1 → Central Silk Board; Platform-2 → Krishnarajapura / KIAL Terminals; Platform numbers (TBC)
- Tracks: 2 (TBC)
- Connections: Mahadevapura & emc² bus stops

Construction
- Structure type: Elevated, double track
- Platform levels: 2 (TBC)
- Parking: (TBC)
- Accessible: (TBC)

Other information
- Status: Under construction
- Station code: DRDO (TBC)

History
- Opening: December 2026; 3 months' time (TBC)
- Electrified: (TBC)

Services
Preceding station	Namma Metro	Following station
Doddanekundi towards Central Silk Board	Blue Line (future service)	Sarasvathi Nagara towards Krishnarajapura or KIAL Terminals
Route map
Location

Bagmane Developers - DRDO Sports Complex (formerly called as DRDO Sports Complex) is an upcoming elevated metro station on the north-south corridor of the Blue Line of Namma Metro in Bengaluru, India. This metro station serves mainly Bagmane Tech Park, which is occupied by top IT companies such as NVIDIA and Samsung under Bagmane Goldstone and Dell EMC, ARM Embedded Technologies, Accenture and Boeing under Bagmane World Technology Centre in South Bengaluru. This metro station is slated to become operational December 2026 instead of June 2026.

Recently Bagmane Tech Park had signed an agreement for construction of this metro station under Blue Line of Namma Metro and registered its rights for 30 years subject to the approval from the State Government. This is the third metro station after KIAL Terminals (MoU with BIAL) and Bettahalasuru (MoU with Embassy Group).

== History ==
In December 2019, the Bangalore Metro Rail Corporation Limited (BMRCL) invited bids for the construction of the DRDO Sports Complex metro station, part of the 8.377 km Reach 2A – Package 2 (Kodibeesanahalli - Krishnarajapura) of the 18.236 km Blue Line of Namma Metro. On 13 October 2020, Shankaranarayana Constructions (SNC) was chosen as the lowest bidder for this segment, with their proposal closely matching the initial cost estimates. As a result, the contract was awarded to the company, which led to the beginning of the construction works of this metro station as per the agreed terms.

== Station layout ==
Station layout - to be confirmed

G	Street level	Exit/entrance
L1	Mezzanine	Fare control, station agent, Metro Card vending machines, crossover
L2	Side platform | Doors will open on the left
L2	Platform # Soutbound	Towards → Central Silk Board; Next station: Doddanekundi
L2	Platform # Northbound	Towards ← Krishnarajapura ** Next station: Sarasvathi Nagar
L2	Side platform | Doors will open on the left
L2	Note:	** To be further extended to KIAL Terminals in future

== See also ==
- Bangalore
- List of Namma Metro stations
- Transport in Karnataka
- List of metro systems
- List of rapid transit systems in India
- Bangalore Metropolitan Transport Corporation
