= Subex =

Indian enterprise software company

Subex Limited
- Type: Public
- Traded as: NSE: SUBEXLTD; BSE: 532348; LSE: SUBX
- Industry: Telecommunications
- Founded: 1992; 34 years ago
- Founders: Subash Menon; Alex Puthenchira
- Headquarters: Bangalore, Karnataka, India
- Number of locations: 5 (India, United States, United Kingdom, Singapore and United Arab Emirates)
- Area served: Worldwide
- Key people: Nisha Dutt (CEO); Sumit Agarwal (CFO); Asha Subramanian (CHRO); Harsha Angeri (Vice President - Corporate Strategy)
- Website: www.subex.com

Subex Limited is an Indian enterprise software company based in Bangalore, which provides digital trust products to communication service providers. The company is listed on BSE and NSE in India.

== History ==
Subex was founded in 1992 by Subash Menon and Alex Puthenchira as a marketing company; the word "Subex" is a portmanteau of the founders' first names. The company then started providing enterprise software services like revenue assurance, fraud detection and network analytics to telecom operators. The company went public in July 1999, and got listed on the Bombay Stock Exchange and National Stock Exchange of India.

In 2006, Subex acquired British firm Azure Solutions for US$140 million in a merger deal and renamed itself as Subex Azure Limited. The acquisition was then the biggest by an Indian IT company. In 2007, the company acquired Syndesis, a Canadian operations support software company, for US$164.5 million. The company's GDR was issued on the London Stock Exchange in March 2007.

Subex's debt rose during the Great Recession due to the foreign currency convertible bonds (FCCBs) issued to fund the acquisitions. In 2011, Subex sold the provisioning and activation verticals of Syndesis to Netcracker Technology. In 2012, Menon resigned from the company, and Surjeet Singh was named the new CEO and managing director. By 2016, Subex converted the FCCBs and was reported to have become a debt-free company.

In 2018, Vinod Kumar was appointed as the CEO and managing director of Subex. The company then expanded its business operations to the domains of Internet of Things (IoT) security, artificial intelligence and digital trust. In April 2021, Subex launched an enterprise cloud-native augmented analytics platform named HyperSense.

In April 2023, Nisha Dutt was appointed as the CEO of Subex.
