= VL =

VL and variants may refer to:

== Science and technology ==
- Daisy V/L, the first production rifle for caseless ammunition
- Ventral lateral nucleus, a component of the thalamus in the central nervous system
- Visceral leishmaniasis, an infectious disease

== Transportation ==
- Holden Commodore (VL), an automobile introduced by Holden in 1986
- City Airlines (IATA code: VL), a German regional airline subsidiary of Lufthansa
- Air VIA (former IATA code: VL), a Bulgarian charter airline
- Valtion lentokonetehdas, the former Finnish State aircraft manufacturer

== Abbreviations ==
- Vapauden liitto, the Freedom Alliance, Finnish political party

== Other uses ==
- Verbotene Liebe, ("Forbidden Love"), a German soap opera
- Flanders (Vlaanderen), one of the three regions of Belgium
- Volume licensing, using one license for many computers or users
- Vulgar Latin, nonstandard sociolects of Latin from which the Romance languages developed

== See also ==
- Vertical takeoff, vertical landing (VTVL), for rockets
- V equals L
- VI (disambiguation)
- V&L, Dutch handball club
- VLE (disambiguation)
- VNL (disambiguation)
- VLS (disambiguation)
