= OSS/BSS =

Concept in telecommunications

OSS/BSS, in telecommunications, refer to operations support system and business support system. The distinction emphasizes a separation of concerns between maintaining network operations and the business around which that network is built. Communications service providers support a broad range of services and functions with their OSS/BSS. BSS primarily consists of order capture, Customer Relationship Management and Telecommunications billing whereas OSS covers Order Management, Network Inventory Management and Network Operations.

== History ==
Previously OSS and BSS were more clearly separate entities but the term OSS/BSS (or occasionally BSS/OSS) has been in use since at least 2000. The interface, for example, between the BSS capturing an order and the OSS fulfilling it could be quite simple.

== See also ==
- Telecommunications Management Network (TMN)
- FCAPS
- Open Network Automation Platform
- Operations support system
