= VNL =

VNL may refer to:

== Groups, organizations ==
- Vanilla Air (ICAO airline code VNL), Japanese airline
- Victorian Netball League, a netball league in Victoria, Australia
- Video Networks Limited (1992–2006), British company acquired by Tiscali in 2006
- Vinyl Group Ltd (ASX ticker: VNL), Australian musitech company
- Volleyball Nations League, annual volleyball tournaments:
  - FIVB Men's Volleyball Nations League
  - FIVB Women's Volleyball Nations League
- VoorNederland (Dutch: For the Netherlands), a Dutch political party founded by Bontes/Van Klaveren

== Computing, software, telecomm ==
- Atomistix Virtual NanoLab, a simulation software from Atomistix for analysis of physical and chemical nanoscale properties
- Via Net Loss, telco circuit switching network architecture
- VNL (vision numerics library), part of the VXL (vision-X-libraries) collection
- von Neumann-Landauer limit, a lower bound on energy consumption for computation

== Other uses ==
- Vanalite (mineral symbol Vnl), see List of mineral symbols
- Vennesla Station (station code VNL), Vennesla, Vennesla, Agder, Norway; a train station
- Victor Nilsson Lindelöf, Swedish footballer who has played for Manchester United and the Swedish national team
- Journal of Vinyl and Additive Technology (abbrev. vnl)
- Vnitr̆ní Lékar̆ství ("Internal Medicine"; abbrev. vnl), Czech medical journal
- Volvo VNL heavy duty truck
- Voltage no-load (V_{nl}); another term for open-circuit voltage (V_{OC})
- Veselí nad Lužnicí, town in the Czech Republic

== See also ==
- V equals L
- V&L, Dutch handball club
- VL (disambiguation)
