= AMATPS =

Telecommunications and support service

AMATPS is an Operations Support System developed during the early 1980s by the Bell System and Bell Communications Research. AMATPS is an acronym that stands for Automatic Message Accounting Tele-Processing System. The purpose of this OSS and communications application was to transport customer billing information from switching systems to a centralized computer that serves as a repository for billing data. Nearly all wireline and wireless telecommunications companies utilize similar technologies today to transport near-real-time billing information.

Early systems deployed in the mid-1970s include HOBIC or Hotel Billing Information Center features deployed with Traffic Service Position System TSPS switching systems used for operator-assisted calls. HOBIC provided near-real-time billing to hotels for calls initiated by their guests.
