= Service assurance =

Application of policies and processes by a Communications Service Provider

Service assurance, in telecommunications, is the application of policies and processes by a Communications Service Provider (CSP) to ensure that services offered over networks meet a pre-defined service quality level for an optimal subscriber experience.

The practice of service assurance enables CSPs to identify faults in the network and resolve these issues in a timely manner so as to minimize service downtime. The practice also includes policies and processes to proactively pinpoint, diagnose and resolve service quality degradations or device malfunctions before subscribers are impacted.

== Areas covered ==
Service assurance encompasses the following:

- Fault and event management
- Performance management
- Probe monitoring
- Quality of service (QoS) management
- Network and service testing
- Network traffic management
- Customer experience management
- Service level agreement (SLA) monitoring
- Trouble ticket management

== Adoption ==
There are many drivers for service assurance adoption, with some considering the most important to be the ability to measure the performance of a service. A subscriber's service experience quality can be directly linked to customer churn. Therefore, maintaining satisfactory service quality levels is key to creating customer stickiness.

Other factors driving growing interest in service assurance include increasing competition, new challenges due to the convergence of networks, services, applications and devices, enabling services over IP and the merging of IT and telecommunications services. But ultimately, it is the CSP's ability to ensure a satisfactory level of QoS that will have the greatest impact on revenue.

The importance of service performance is also reinforced by research stating that two thirds of subscribers will stop trying a new service after two failed attempts with that service. Therefore, it is increasingly apparent that service assurance tools must be put in place prior to the introduction of a new service if it is to be successful in the market. This is particularly true of deployments of such services as VoIP, IPTV and mobile video.

Service assurance spending by CSPs is forecast to grow to US$3.0 billion by 2011. Leading global service assurance providers include InfoVista, VIAVI, TEOCO, Ericsson, nsn, EXFO, MYCOM OSI, Centina, Anritsu, Epitiro, Riverbed Technology, Spirent, Empirix, JumpSoft, Computer Associates, EMC, Telcordia, Tektronix, RADCOM, CENX, Agilent, Cisco, HP, IBM, IBM Tivoli/Netcool and Softenger (I) Pvt Ltd.

== See also ==
- Service fulfillment
