= Service Evaluation System =

The Service Evaluation System (SES) was an operations support system developed by Bell Laboratories and used by telephone companies beginning in the late 1960s. Many local, long distance, and operator circuit-switching systems provided special dedicated circuits to the SES to monitor the quality of customer connections during the call setup process. Calls were selected at random by switching systems and one-way voice connections were established to the SES monitoring center.

During this era, most voice connections used analog trunk circuits that were designed to conform with the Via Net Loss plan established by Bell Laboratories. The purpose of the VNL plan and five-level long distance switching hierarchy was to minimize the number of trunk circuits in a call and maximize the voice quality of the connections. Excessive loss in a voice connection meant that subscribers may have difficulty hearing each other. This was particularly important in the 1960s when dial up data connections were developed with the use of analog modems. The SES evaluated multi-frequency outpulsing signaling as well as voice impairments including sound amplitude, noise, echo, and a variety of other parameters. Deployment of common-channel signaling systems such as Common Channel Interoffice Signaling and later Signaling System #7 obviated the need to monitor multi-frequency signaling as it became obsolete.

The Service Evaluation System was described in Notes on the Network published by AT&T in 1970, 1975, 1980 and later versions published by Bell Communications Research (now Telcordia Technologies) in 1983, 1986, 1990, 1994, and 2000.
