= EADAS =

EADAS is an acronym for Engineering and Administrative Data Acquisition System created at Bell Laboratories in Columbus, Ohio and used in the Bell System during the 1970s. EADAS was an Operations Support System (OSS) developed for the AT&T long distance and local Bell System telephone networks. The EADAS system collected network traffic usage data, generated periodic management reports, provided network management code controls and routing controls, and provided automated trouble analysis support for network support staff. EADAS was developed by a collaborative effort between Wisconsin Bell, a major "trial site", and Bell Laboratories in both Holmdel, New Jersey and Columbus, Ohio.

This OSS was deployed on DEC PDP-11 computer systems throughout the Bell System network of central offices. See the Bell System Technical Journal published during the mid-1970s for more details.
