= Loop maintenance operations system =

Trouble ticketing system

The Loop Maintenance Operations System (LMOS) is a telephone company trouble ticketing system to coordinate repairs of local loops (telephone lines). When a problem is reported by a subscriber, it is filed and relayed through the Cross Front End, which is a link from the CRSAB (Centralized Repair Service Answering Bureau) to the LMOS network. The trouble report is then sent to the Front End via the Datakit network, where a Basic Output Report is requested (usually by a screening agent or lineman). The BOR provides line information including past trouble history and MLT (Mechanized Loop Testing) tests. As LMOS is responsible for trouble reports, analysis, and similar related functions, MLT does the actual testing of customer loops. MLT hardware is located in the Repair Service Bureau. Test trunks connect MLT hardware to the telephone exchanges or wire centers, which in turn connect with the subscriber loops.

The LMOS database is a proprietary file system, designed with 11 access methods (variable index, index, hash tree, fixed partition file, etc.). This is highly tuned for the various pieces of data used by LMOS.

LMOS, which was first brought on line as a mainframe application in the 1970s, was one of the first telephone company operations support systems to be ported to the UNIX operating system. The first port of LMOS was to Digital Equipment Corporation's PDP 11/70 machines and was completed in 1981. Later versions used VAX-11/780s. Today, LMOS runs on HP-UX 11i systems.

== See also ==
- Operations support systems
