= Trunks Integrated Record Keeping System =

Operations support system for telecommunications first developed in the 1970s

Trunks Integrated Record Keeping System (TIRKS) is an operations support system originally developed by the Bell System during the late 1970s. It was developed for inventory and order control management of interoffice trunk circuits that interconnect telephone switches.

TIRKS supports circuits from POTS and 150 baud modems up through T1, DS3, SONET and DWDM, and continues to evolve today. TIRKS became a registered trademark in 1987. A version of TIRKS was given to AT&T Communications as part of the AT&T divestiture. This version of the system has evolved separately from the version at Bell Communications Research.
