= VLE =

VLE may refer to:

== Science and technology ==
- Vapor–liquid equilibrium, in thermodynamics and chemical engineering
- Virtual learning environment, in educational technology
- Maximum landing gear extended speed (V_{LE}), a V speed in aviation
- Variable-length encoding, an information theory technique for assigning shorter encoding to more frequently-occurring sequences
  - Variable-length encoding of an instruction set, as is used in a variable-length instruction set
  - Variable-length, aka variable-width encoding
- Mercedes-Benz VLE, a battery electric minivan

== Other uses ==
- Universal Lithuanian Encyclopedia (Visuotinė lietuvių enciklopedija)

== See also ==
- VL (disambiguation)
