= Schiller International University =

For-profit university in Tampa, Florida, US

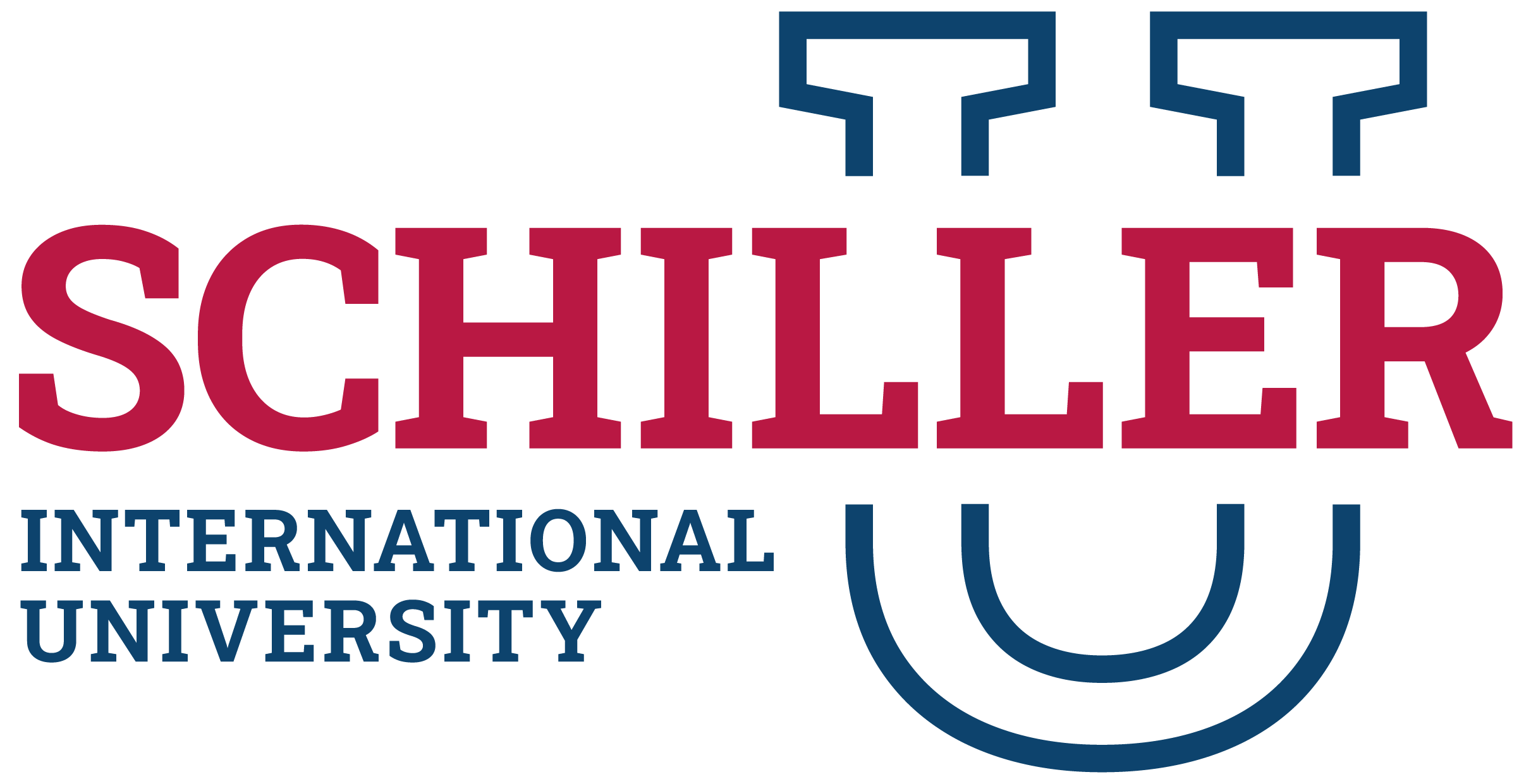
- Type: Private for-profit university
- Established: 1964; 62 years ago
- Founder: Walter Leibrecht
- Accreditation: ACCSC
- President: Dr. Jennifer King
- Provost: Dr. Saib Othman
- Location: Tampa, Florida, Paris, France, Madrid, Spain, Heidelberg, Germany
- Campus: Urban
- Website: schiller.edu

Schiller International University (SIU) is a private, for-profit university with its main campus and administrative headquarters in Tampa, Florida. It is named after the German playwright and philosopher Friedrich Schiller.

It has campuses on two continents in four countries: Tampa (United States), Paris (France), Madrid (Spain), Heidelberg (Germany). Schiller offers bachelor's and master's degrees. It also offers online degrees through distance learning.

== History ==
Schiller was founded in 1964 by Walter Leibrecht, a German professor who taught at Columbia University and Harvard University, as a study-abroad program for Americans living in West Germany. In 1967, Schiller International University opened Madrid and Paris international campuses. Students could move around the two campuses. Two years later, Schiller moved its international campus in Germany to Heidelberg and in 1983 they received accreditation from the Accrediting Council for Independent Colleges and Schools. In 1991, the university opened its international Campus in Tampa, Florida.

In 2023, Schiller International University was accredited by the Accrediting Commission of Career Schools and Colleges.

== Campuses ==
=== Tampa ===
The university's administrative headquarters and admissions office are in Tampa. At one time it was located in Dunedin, Florida. By 2006, the university moved to East Bay Drive and then Ulmerton Road in Largo.

=== Paris ===
In 2022, the Schiller Paris campus moved from the 15th arrondissement of Paris to a new location near the Arc de Triomphe, at 55 Avenue Hoche.

=== Madrid ===
Since February 2023, the Madrid Campus is located in a historic building on Paseo de Recoletos next to Paseo del Prado and the Spanish National Library. The Madrid campus specializes in International Business and in International Relations. In addition to US accreditation, the Madrid campus is recognized by the Comunidad de Madrid, allowing students to apply for "homologación."

=== Heidelberg ===
Schiller International University opened its first campus in 1964 at a medieval castle in Ingersheim, near Stuttgart in southern Germany. In 1969, the university relocated its German campus to Heidelberg, which would eventually become the institution's largest and most prominent location. Over the years, the Heidelberg campus operated from several notable sites, including a facility at Hölderlinweg 8 in the Altstadt (Old Town) during the 1980s and the historic Villa Krehl on Bergstraße in the district of Handschuhsheim. In the summer of 2012, the campus was moved to modern facilities in the Bahnstadt, a newly developed district known for its focus on sustainability and innovation.

== Accreditation ==
Schiller International University has been accredited by the Accrediting Commission of Career Schools and Colleges (ACCSC) since May 2023.

As of 2015, Schiller students can gain a double degree awarded by Schiller and the University of Roehampton in the United Kingdom, thanks to a bilateral agreement between both universities. This double degree is valid in the United States and in the 45 countries of the Bologna Process and the Commonwealth.In addition, Schiller has established a double degree agreement with Dublin Business School (DBS) in Ireland allowing eligible students to earn a second qualification recognized within the European Higher Education Area (EHEA).

== Academics ==
Schiller International University follows a U.S. curriculum and offers competency-based courses. English is the language of instruction on all campuses. Students may relocate from campus to campus while continuing their academic program.

The university offers undergraduate and graduate degree programs in fields such as International Relations and Diplomacy, International Business, International Hospitality and Tourism Management, and International Marketing. Additional programs include Data Science and Artificial Intelligence, Sustainability, Computer Science, and Global Trade and Finance. The academic model is based on a 2-day intensive class and term course delivery, immersive learning, and challenge-based methodology.

In June 2024, Schiller International University signed a cooperation agreement with the United Nations Institute for Training and Research (UNITAR). Through this partnership, students enrolled in the Bachelor's program in International Relations and Diplomacy and in the Master's in Sustainability Management are eligible for internships at United Nations institutions and can participate in joint activities, specialized training sessions, and co-certified courses aligned with global diplomatic and sustainable development goals.

== Notable alumni ==
- Simon Bowthorpe (born 1964), English
- Usman Dar, Pakistani politician
- Paras Shah, Ex Crown Prince of Nepal
- Otto Sonnenholzner, former Vice-President of Ecuador

== See also ==
- List of colleges and universities in Florida
- List of international schools in the United States
