= Fanfare (company) =

- Type: Private
- Industry: Software
- Founded: 2004; 22 years ago
- Founders: Kingston Duffie; Denise Savoie; Carl Hubbard
- Defunct: February 14, 2011
- Fate: Acquired by Spirent Communications
- Headquarters: Mountain View, California, United States
- Website: fanfaresoftware.com

Fanfare was a U.S. technology company located in Mountain View, California, which developed automated testing software that enables telecom service providers, network equipment manufacturers, and enterprises to automate quality testing of their products and services. Fanfare's flagship test automation product, iTest is built for testers, developers, and automation specialists. iTest automates feature, black box, and regression testing to accelerate system and device testing throughout the quality process. Fanfare was bought by Spirent Communications in early 2011.

== History ==
Fanfare was founded in 2004 by Kingston Duffie, Denise Savoie, and Carl Hubbard. A serial entrepreneur by nature, Duffie also founded Turnstone Systems, which went public in 2000; and Whitetree Inc., a network switch maker that was acquired in 1997 by Ascend Communications. Fanfare was the first company to commercialize an automated testing product that addressed the testing challenges around increasingly complex network devices. To get the job done, feature testers and device testers tend to rely on traditional script-based automation, a time-intensive approach that requires highly trained manual testers to accomplish. With this approach, it can take hours or days to set up devices, configure test beds, and communicate basic test reports. Language barriers from geographically dispersed QA teams exacerbate the problem, resulting in duplicated efforts and reduced productivity.

Additionally, scripting skills were phased out of college engineering programs, resulting in a shortage of skilled scripters. Testers without a wide range of scripting abilities are often unable to contribute to the testing process, resulting in further automation backlog. At the same time, telecom service providers are struggling to keep up with the demand for more bandwidth, Wireless and services. The increasing popularity of video, and need for wireless connectivity and broadband speed, is taxing existing networks, and network testing to verify the continuous stream of software updates to network applications can't keep up with volume. The testing requirements are growing exponentially but the resources and techniques cannot keep pace.

As a result, products and services can be released to market without undergoing the proper testing. Quality suffers, as do companies' bottom lines as time to market is dependent on how quickly testing can be completed.

Duffie identified this critical void in the market, recognizing the need for software that simplified device and network testing. Fanfare released its first product to market in July 2005, and continues to enhance its product offerings to solve these ongoing challenges.

== Alliances and Industry Groups ==
- NTAF (Network Test Automation Forum)
- TesLA Alliance (Test Lab Automation Alliance)
