= Bagmane Group =

Indian real estate developer

Coordinates: 12.978611°N 77.661111°E

Bagmane Developers Pvt. Ltd.
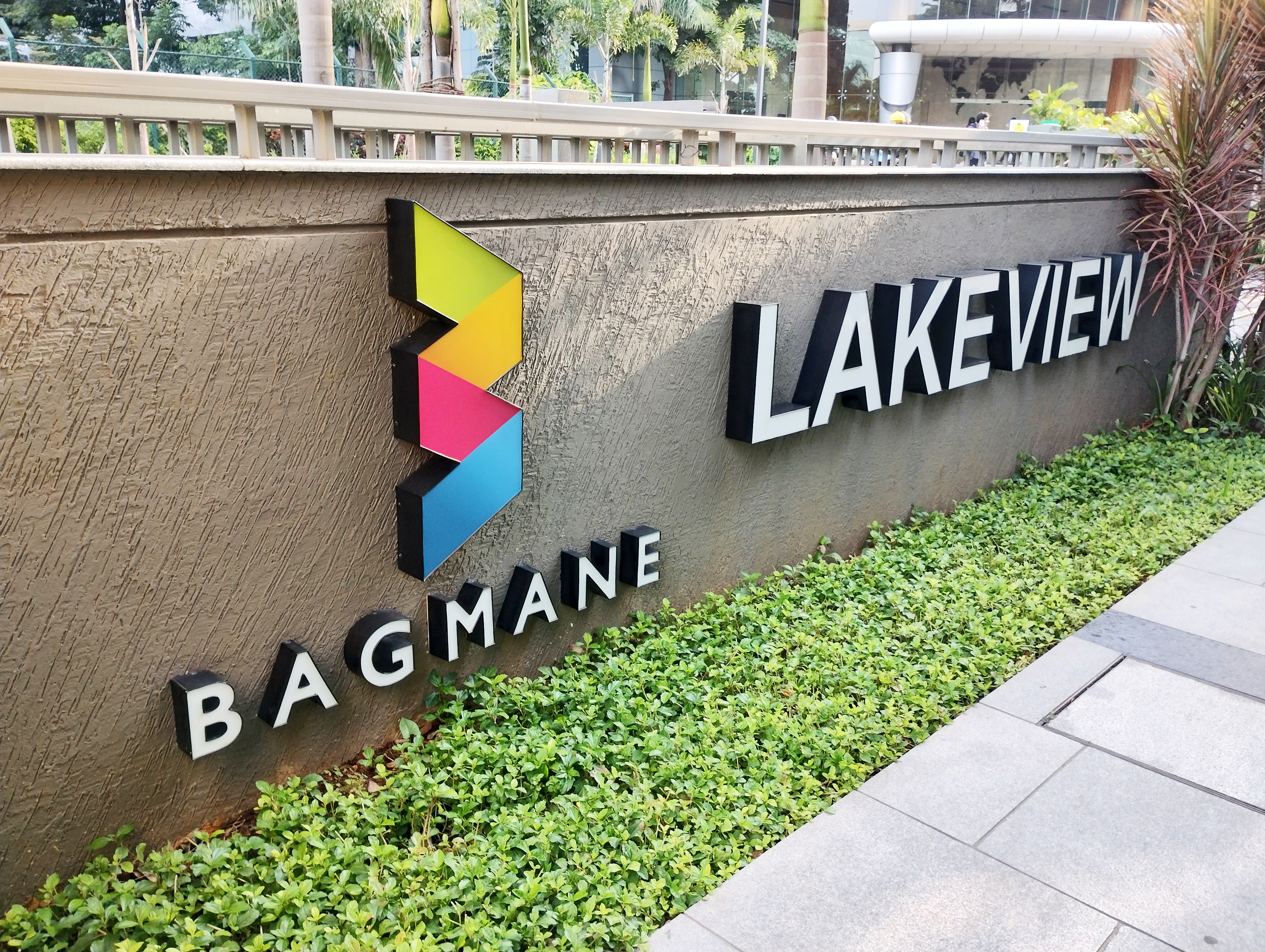
- Bagmane Tech Park
- Type: Private
- Industry: Real estate investment management and real estate development
- Founded: 1996; 30 years ago
- Headquarters: Bengaluru, India
- Website: bagmanegroup.com

Bagmane Group is a real estate developer based in Bengaluru, India.

== History ==
Bagmane was founded in 1996. Its flagship IT park, Bagmane Tech Park, was one of the earliest in Bengaluru when launched in 2001. As of 2025, it operates around 30 million sq.ft. of offices and controls a land bank with development potential for 31 million sq.ft.

In December 2024, US-based investment firm Blackstone purchased a minority stake in Bagmane. In July 2025, the group was reported to be considering an IPO valued at up to ₹4,000 crore (US$419 million).

== Properties ==
To date, all of Bagmane's business parks have been in Bengaluru, India, although the company is developing parks in Chennai and the Delhi National Capital Region.

- Bagmane Tech Park, C V Raman Nagar (2001). This park is built and maintained by Bagmane Group. The park shares its boundaries with HAL and DRDO and is near the HAL Airport. Consisting of 10 large buildings, the park is home to companies including Boeing India Pvt Ltd etc., Alstom Transport, CommVault Systems, Netserv Technologies, Informatica, Infineon Technologies, Dover Corporation, HSBC, Motorola, Hewlett Packard Enterprise, Publicis Sapient, Grant Thornton India, Oracle Financial Services Software Limited, HP, Juniper Networks, Ericsson, Lenovo, Texas Instruments, LinkedIn, MphasiS, Sasken, Micro Focus, Cognizant Technology Solutions, Ogilvy, Volvo, Dell, Tecnotree, Concur Technologies, PwC, CME Group, Palo Alto Networks.
- Bagmane World Technology Centre, Outer Ring Road (2007).
- Bagmane Constellation Business Park, Outer Ring Road
- Bagmane Capital
- Bagmane Bagmane Solarium City, Whitefield
- Bagmane Sierra Business District, Whitefield

== Gallery ==
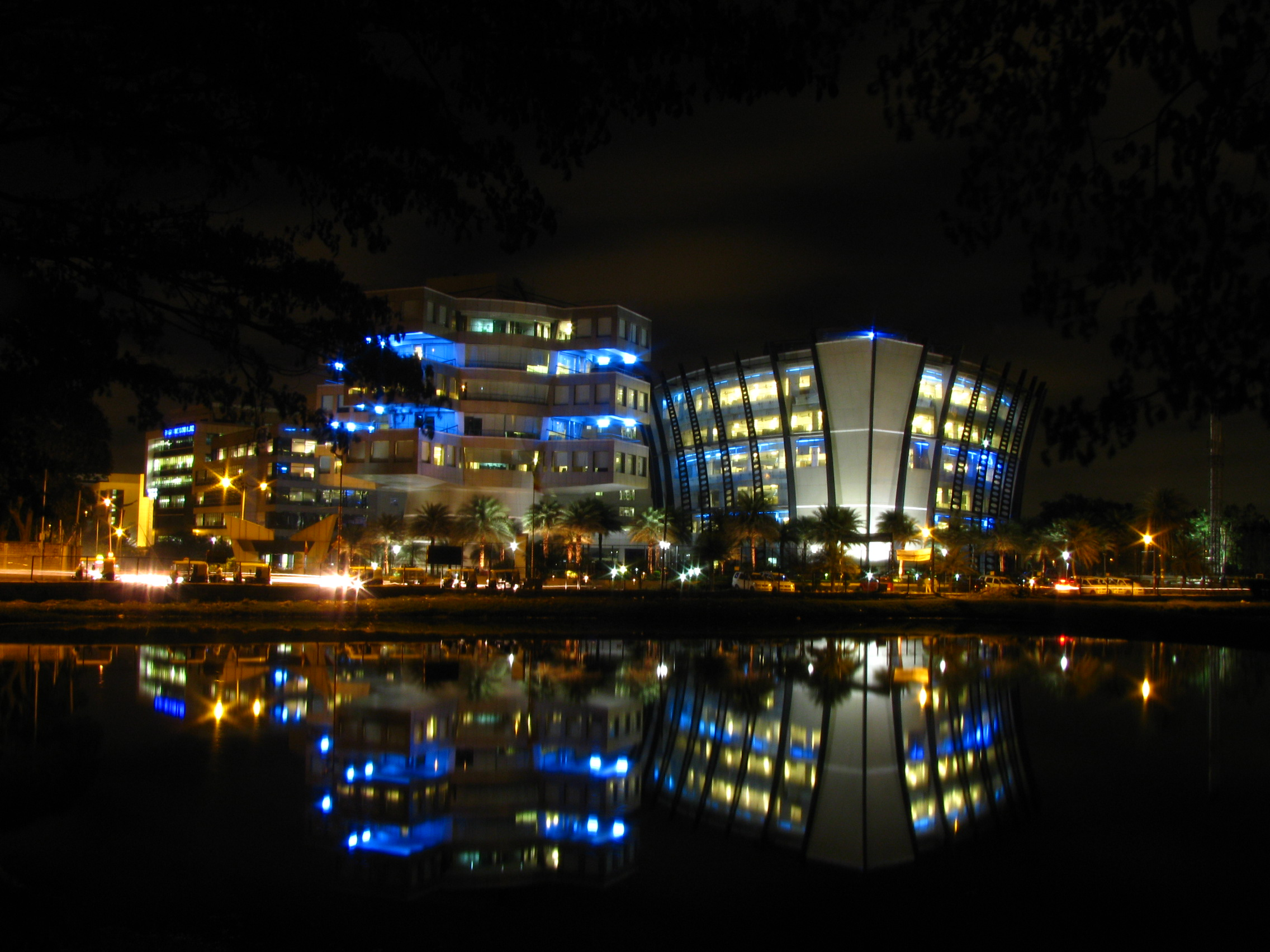
Offices of Oracle and others in Bagmane Tech Park Bangalore

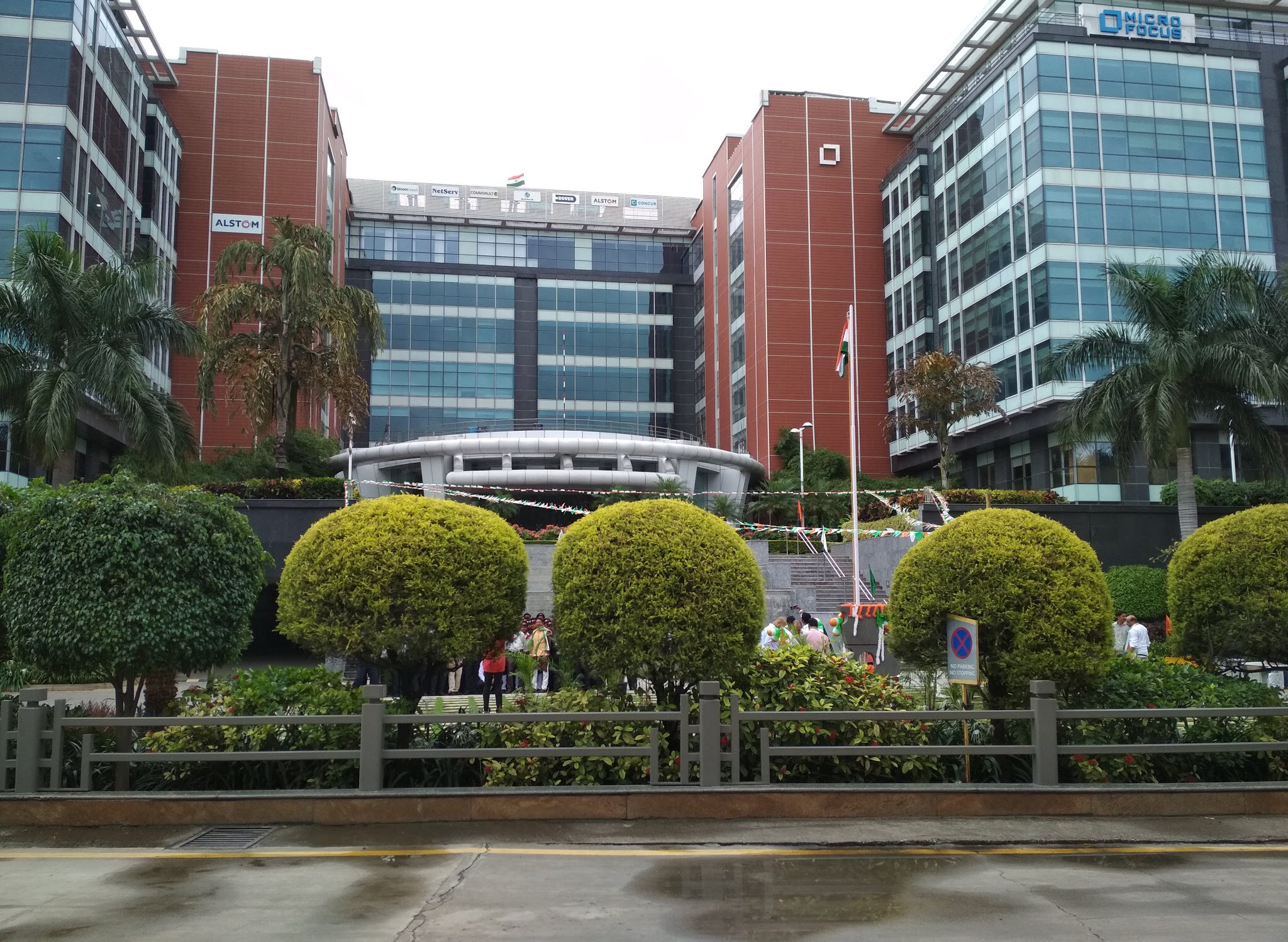
The Bagmane Tech Park houses many IT companies

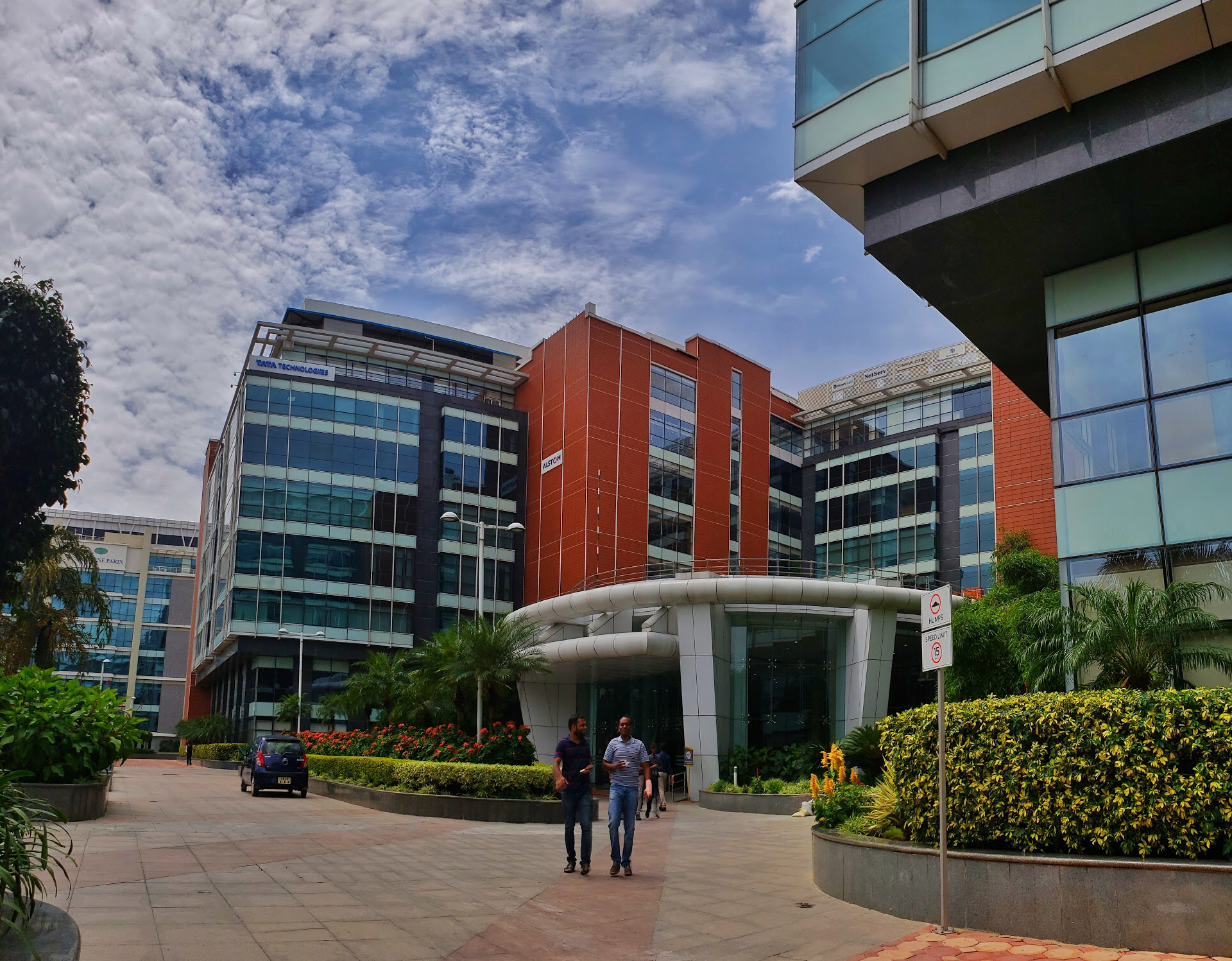
