= Jack Bowthorpe =

British electric equipment businessman (1905–1978)

Jack Bowthorpe CBE (8 July 1905 – 24 July 1978) was the founder of Spirent plc, one of the United Kingdom's largest telecommunications businesses.

== Early life ==
Orphaned, he started working at the General Electric Co. in London, aged 16, as a ledger clerk, before moving into the sales and finally the export department. In 1926, he left GEC to join the Electrical Equipment & Carbon Co. in New Oxford Street. He was a keen amateur footballer, playing with the Christ Church Athletic Club for many years, which is where he met Ray Parsons. In 1934 he married Norah Beatrice Davies and they had two children, Peter (21 May 1935 – 27 September 2016) and Sonia (born 1937). In 1938, Jack Bowthorpe exhibited at the Leipzig Fair.

== Career ==
Borrowing £2,000 from a relative, Jack Bowthorpe started his own business in 1936 originally trading as Goodlife Electrical Supplies although, on repayment of the loan in 1938, Bowthorpe Electric Ltd was established with the help of Park Trust Ltd (Lord Doverdale's family trust). He operated his business from a garage in 8, Eagle Street, London, W.C.1., cutting up electrical wiring into standard lengths and selling it to the aircraft industry. He was one of the first people to realise that the purpose of different cables needed to be identified by the colour of their sleevings. He initially employed one person, Ray Parsons, to assist him and together they built the Company into one of the UK's largest electrical businesses.

He was awarded the CBE for services to British Industry in 1978. He died later that year.

== Works ==
- Bowthorpe, Jack (1976). The Bowthorpe Story.
