= Arkipelago =

American cultural organization

Arkipelago was a volunteer-run cultural organization based in New York City that promoted critical dialogue and community engagement around important issues concerning the Philippines and the Filipino Diaspora. Arkipelago is known for promoting conversations regarding immigrant rights, AIDS, generational gaps, and racism through arts related projects and programs.

== History ==
Arkipelago was formed on December 10, 1993.

The organization was developed out of Boses Filipino, an annual arts-based event that provided a space for Filipino/American artists to share their work. The night consisted of songs, poetry, dance, and other performances that visualized contemporary issues faced by local Filipino communities. The event presented a venue for Filipino and Filipino Americans to share their experiences and concerns.

The event was named “Arkipelago,” the Tagalog translation of the word “archipelago.”

What was intended as a one-night event became an advocacy organization that continues to put up art-based events relevant to its cause. Sa Pinilakang Tabing (On the Silver Screen), Pelikulang Pilipino (Filipino Films), and the Salamin, are examples of events Arkipelego went on to create.

The organization also participated in Street Theatre performances, where they raised awareness of abandoned toxic waste on US bases in the Philippines, domestic workers, mail-order brides, and anti-immigrant legislation. By the 2000s, Arkipelago became one of the most significant Filipino art platforms in New York City.

== Programs ==
=== Sa Pinilakang Tabing (On the Silver Screen) ===
"On the Silver Screen" screened films and videos installations that address the conflicts and experiences of a Filipino/Filipino American. "On the Silver Screen" was the only annual film festival hosted by Arkipelago on the East Coast. If the work was not about the Filipino or the Philippines, at least one or more of the production crew(art director, cinematographer, director, editor, producer or screenwriter) had to be of Filipino descendant. The submitted artworks had to adhere to the following restrictions:

1. The work must be in VHS format for prescreening purposes.
2. Video installation artists must include 8-10 35 mm slides of artwork.
3. Complete submissions should include artist's resume, biography, statement(s) and synopsis of submitted work(s).
4. Press information and film stills are preferred, but not necessary.
5. Include self-addressed, stamped envelope for return of materials.

==== On the Silver Screen 97' ====
The fourth Sa Pinilakang Tabing (On the Silver Screen) was held in 1997 to celebrate the 100th year of Filipino cinema. Although Filipino cinema is one of the country's greatest cultural assets, it rarely receives chances for exposure and screening in the U.S. due to the lack of funding and government initiative, which presents Sa Pinilakang Tabing with a great opportunity. The documentary film "Private Wars" by Nick Deocampo was screened during the opening night. Deocampo is a significant independent filmmaker from the Philippines. His works have gained international interests and garnered critical acclaim.

=== Pelikulang Pilipino (Filipino Films) ===
Pelikulang Pilipino was a three-part function composed of a general overview of contemporary Philippine cinema, screened excerpts from a select few Filipino films, and paneled reviews of the screenings. The events served as a loose blueprint for the annual film festival.

=== maARTe.org ===
"maARTe.org" is an art related webzine that discussed issues brought out through artists' works or responses to them. The webzine captured the Filipino art scene and recorded concerns the art raised at the opening of the twenty-first century. The Arkipelago archive consists of electronic files of the webzine.

=== Brainfood Sessions ===
Brainfood Sessions was a forum where invited artists discussed and presented their works. Arkipelago's events are mostly documented through objects such as banners, flags, and leaflets. 4 in × 6 in (100 mm × 150 mm) color photographs document Brainfood Sessions, Arkipelago's participation in the Coalition of Asian Pacific Americans’ (CAPA) Annual Asian/Pacific American Heritage Festival, and Sa Pinilakang Tabing(On the Silver Screen).

=== Salamin ===
Held on August 10, 1994, at the Art in General Gallery at 79 Walker Street, Salamin brought together five local Filipino and Filipino-American artists to take part in a forum and slide presentation. Recognizing the isolating working and living environments of Filipino and Filipino-American artists, Arkipelago sponsored Salamin as a platform for dialogue and collaboration to exhibit the strength in sharing perspectives and experiences of Filipino diaspora. The five artists who shared their insights and work were: Paul Pfieffer, Christine Quisumbing Ramilo, Lewanda Lim, Ayan Rivera, and Genera Banzon.

=== Tagalog on Site ===
Though not an Arkipelago program, it was founded by its first program director - the educator, activist, and writer Susan Quimpo. Tagalog On Site provides second and third generation Filipino Americans with the opportunity to travel to the Philippines to uncover their heritage first-hand. Her work with Filipino-Americans was inspired by a Philippine history workshop she conducted in New York. The workshop elicited a homogenous sense of national pride and desire for more knowledge among her young audience. By offering lectures on Philippine history, culture, and politics, Tagalog on Site works to assist adolescent Filipino-Americans in reclaiming their roots.
