= VLS =

VLS may refer to:

- Valk Last Slot, a set of speedcubing algorithms
- Vapor-Liquid-Solid method, a method of growing nanocrystals
- Vermont Law School
- Vertical Launching System for firing missiles
- Vertical Lift System, a style of scissor doors
- VideoLAN Server
- Von Luschan's chromatic scale of skin colour
- West Flemish, a dialect in Belgium, ISO 639-3 code

== See also ==
- VLS-1, the Brazilian Space Agency satellite launcher
