= Tecnotree =

Tecnotree Corporation
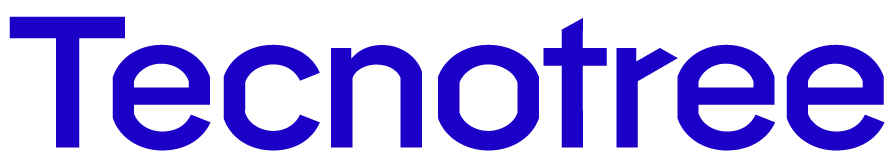
- Type: Julkinen osakeyhtiö
- Traded as: Nasdaq Helsinki: TEM1V
- Industry: Telecommunications; Computer software
- Founded: Espoo, Finland (1978)
- Headquarters: Espoo, Finland
- Area served: Worldwide
- Key people: Padma Ravichander , Chief Executive Officer
- Products: Messaging and charging solutions
- Revenue: ▲€52.8M (2020)
- Website: www.tecnotree.com

Tecnotree Corporation is a Finnish vendor of software to telecommunications service providers. It operates in the BSS sector.

== History ==
In 2008 the Finnish company Tecnomen acquired Indian company Lifetree for $46 million. Initially it was rebranded as Tecnomen Lifetree before being rebranded once more in 2010 as Tecnotree.

Tecnomen itself was founded in 1978 and was headquartered in Espoo, Finland, where Tecnotree's headquarters are also based.

Tecnotree has offices in Finland, France, South Africa, India, Malaysia, Argentina, Ecuador and Peru. In 2019 it opened a new customer experience centre in Dubai.
