= Via Net Loss =

Via Net Loss (VNL) is a network architecture of telephone systems using circuit switching technologies deployed in the 1950s with Direct Distance Dialing and used until the late 1980s. The purpose of the VNL plan and a five-level long-distance switching hierarchy was to minimize the number of trunk circuits used during a call and maximize the voice quality achieved on each circuit. Excessive noise or loss meant that subscribers may have difficulty hearing each other. This was particularly important in the 1960s when dial-up data applications were developed using analog modems. The five levels of PSTN switching systems used with VNL were:

- Class 1 - Regional long-distance switching systems
- Class 2 - Sectional long-distance switching systems
- Class 3 - Primary long-distance switching systems
- Class 4 - Toll-access switching systems
- Class 5 - End-office switching systems

Class 5 end-office switches provide local telephone service and dialtone to residential, business, and government subscribers, as well as telephone company payphones. Residential service includes message rate and flat rate local calling plans with extra charges for long-distance calls and supplementary services such as call waiting, 3-way calling, and call forwarding. Business service is mostly message rate local calling plans with extra charges for long distance and supplementary services. Message Rate calling means that subscribers pay for calls based on duration of the call and distance to the called party. Government subscribers include cities, counties, state, and federal agencies and often included Centrex service. Pay phones were traditionally provided exclusively by telephone companies but during the early 1980s Customer-owned coin-operated telephone services were established.

Class 4 toll access switches provide long-distance (toll) telephone service including intrastate calling and inter-state calling. Intrastate calls are generally more expensive than inter-state calls due to favorable tariffs with price plans approved by the Public Utilities Commission or Public Service Commission for each state. Inter-state calls are generally less expensive than intrastate calls since tariffs are filed with the Federal Communications Commission because of the inter-state commerce aspect of the service. Class 4 switches provide access to long-distance service in rural areas. In addition, Class 4 switches traditionally provided operator assisted calls such as person-to-person, collect, and calls billed to third parties. However, many operator services are now automated with minimum human intervention.

Class 3 primary switches provided the first layer of the AT&T long-distance switching network. VNL routing methods preferred trunk connections between Class 3 switches to minimize class 1 and class 2 connections. Class 3 switches also act as Service Switching Points or SSP's that provide access to Intelligent Network services such as Toll-Free, Virtual Private Network, Calling Card, and Credit Card calls. If circuits to other Class 3 switches were unavailable, the call was routed to the Class 2 (and/or Class 1) switch in the same region. Calls were not routed "up-chain" to Class 2 or Class 1 switches in a different region. Analog circuits between AT&T long-distance switches are known as Inter-Toll trunks while circuits from a long-distance switch to local switches are known as Toll Completing trunks or toll switching trunks. Trunks between long-distance switches in other carrier networks are known as Inter-Machine Trunks or IMT's.

Class 2 sectional switches provide the second layer of long-distance switching. VNL routing methods preferred trunk connections between the originating Class 2 switch and a Class 3 or Class 2 switch in a different region. Calls were not routed "up-chain" to a Class 1 switch in a different region.

Class 1 regional switches provide the final layer of long-distance switching. VNL routing methods preferred "down-chain" trunk connections between the originating Class 1 switch and a Class 3, Class 2, or Class 1 switch in a different region. Analog trunk connections between Class 1 switches were required to have a loss of zero decibels.

The VNL architecture was gradually phased out due to the conversion of network circuits from analog to digital and the related conversion to a non-hierarchical network routing schemes such as AT&T's Dynamic Non-Hierarchical Routing or Nortel's Dynamically Controlled Routing methods. See IEEE publications for details on DNHR and DCR.

== See also ==
- Service Evaluation System
