= Hammer Technologies =

Software company

Hammer Technologies Inc.
- Formerly: Empirix Inc.
- Type: Private company
- Industry: Telecommunications
- Founded: 1991; 35 years ago
- Founder: Steve Gladstone and John Kuenzig
- Headquarters: Billerica, Massachusetts, United States
- Key people: Alex d'Arbeloff (Chairman)
- Products: Testing of IP communications networks and services
- Owner: Infovista
- Website: www.hammer.com

Hammer Technologies (formerly known as Empirix) is an American company which designs and manufactures service assurance testing and monitoring equipment for IP-based communications networks such as Voice-over-Internet-Protocol (VoIP), IP Multimedia Subsystem (IMS)-based, next generation network and 5G wireless networks.

Hammer is headquartered in Billerica, MA. On April 21, 2021, Hammer was acquired by Infovista, a Network automation software. Infovista, which is majority owned by Apax Partners France, today known as Seven2, said the deal “brings together a team of over 1,000 professionals serving over 1,700 customers across more than 150 countries, including 23 of the top 30 CSPs globally[1].”

== History ==
Hammer Technologies was founded by Steve Gladstone and John Kuenzig in late 1991.

On September 6, 2000, the Hammer test technology spun out of Teradyne to become Empirix Inc., with Teradyne co-founder Alex d'Arbeloff appointed as chairman of the board.

On June 6, 2008, Empirix sold its e-TEST suite, a set of Web application testing products, to Oracle. The company then focused on developing testing and monitoring products for voice quality, contact center equipment, and enterprise communications networks. It also developed carrier-grade products for mobile, cable, and telecom operators.

The July 2010 acquisition of Mutina Technology S.p.A. expanded the company's offerings to cover Mobile Broadband (MBB), Next Generation Networks (NGN), SS7/SIGTRAN Signaling, VoD/IPTV, and IP Core for telecom and enterprise networks.[5]

In November 2013, Empirix was acquired by Thoma Bravo LLC, a private equity partnership.[6]

In April 2021, Empirix was acquired by Infovista.

In October 2022, Empirix rebranded as Hammer.

In January 2024, Hammer updated their legal entity name from Empirix Inc. to Hammer Technologies Inc.

== Technology ==
The company's core Hammer technology was designed to automate the testing of IP communications networks, applications and services. It models realistic user behavior and emulates the associated session-based, network traffic to measure real-time voice and video quality as well as the performance of the underlying infrastructure. This capability enables real-world load testing of pre-production VoIP, Unified Communications, IMS, NGN, mobile and other IP-based networks, applications and equipment. Hammer testing predicts both network traffic issues and the quality of the end-user, customer experience.

Empirix adapted the Hammer test technology to provide on-going monitoring for in-production contact centers, enterprise communications systems as well as telecommunications, cable and mobile operators. Empirix has more than 30 patents and patents-pending.

== Clients and partners ==
Notable deployments of Empirix technology include China Mobile, lastminute.com, National Society for the Prevention of Cruelty to Children, Suddenlink, and Amtrak.

Empirix's partners include Accenture, Avaya, Genesys, IBM, Cisco Systems, Intervoice, Nuance Communications, and Sonus.

== Publications and research ==
Empirix has published a book about testing and monitoring IMS subsystems and services entitled “Ensuring a Quality IMS Experience: A Practical Guide to Testing and Monitoring IP Multimedia Subsystem and Services.” In addition, the company has sponsored a DMG Consulting research study entitled, “Business As Usual? A Benchmarking Study of Disaster Recovery and Business Continuity for Contact Centers.”

Empirix also sponsored the “Companies Unifying the Conversational Contact Center” survey and report created by Opus Research.

== Memberships ==
- European Competitive Telecommunications Association
