= TEOCO =

TEOCO Corp.
- Type: Privately held company
- Industry: Telecommunications
- Genre: Software
- Founded: 1994
- Founder: Atul Jain
- Headquarters: Fairfax, Virginia, United States
- Area served: Worldwide
- Key people: Atul Jain, Chairman & CEO; Philip Giuntini, Vice Chairman & President; Avi Goldstein, CFO
- Website: www.teoco.com

TEOCO is a privately held telecom software vendor based in Fairfax, Virginia, in the United States.

== History ==
TEOCO was founded in 1995 and is based in Fairfax, Virginia. The company's name is an acronym derived from 'The Employee Owned Company.' It has grown through acquisition, which has enabled it to add new solutions to its portfolio, as well as new customers and territories. In October 2009, TA Associates completed a $60 Million minority investment in TEOCO. In 2014 it employed 1,300 people and had revenues of approximately $175 million.

In 2008, Razorsight, a revenue and cost optimization vendor, was ordered to pay TEOCO $4.5 million for theft of TEOCO's intellectual property.

TEOCO was involved in the Iowa Utilities Board and subsequent FCC ruling in Qwest communication's Traffic pumping case. TEOCO, a supplier to Qwest of cost and revenue management solutions, used its technology to capture and analyze five years of call detail records to help determine damages.

=== Acquisitions ===
- 2008 – Vero Systems, a margin management and Least-cost routing solutions vendor
- 2010 – TTI for $58 million
- 2011 – Schema, a provider of software for planning and optimization of Cellular Networks
- 2013 – Aircom, a provider of network design and optimization software and solutions
- 2017 – CETECOM's US Mobile Communications Testing Services (CTS MC) subsidiary
- 2017 – PreClarity, a provider of data processing and analytics solutions
- 2019 – CIQUAL Limited, a vendor of quality of experience (QoE) solutions

== Products ==
TEOCO provides invoice business process outsourcing, consultancy, cloud and support services. This includes: a range of analytics solutions, RAN solutions to address planning and configuration, optimisation and analytics, and service assurance solutions covering performance, fault and service management.

In February 2020, TEOCO announced the latest version of its service assurance platform called HELIX 11.
