= Spirent =

British telecommunications company

Spirent Communications plc
- Type: Public
- Traded as: LSE: SPT
- Industry: Telecommunications
- Founded: 1936; 90 years ago
- Headquarters: Crawley, West Sussex, UK (corporate); San Jose, California, US (operational)
- Key people: Bill Thomas (chairman); Eric Updyke (CEO); Paula Bell (CFO)
- Products: Network diagnostics
- Revenue: ▼US$460.2 million (2024)
- Operating income: ▲US$46.2 million (2024)
- Net income: ▼US$12.9 million (2024)
- Total assets: ▲US$614.2 million (2024)
- Total equity: ▲US$392.5 million (2024)
- Owner: Keysight
- Number of employees: 1,500 (2025)
- Website: spirent.com

Spirent Communications plc is a British multinational telecommunications testing company headquartered in Crawley, West Sussex, in the United Kingdom. It was listed on the London Stock Exchange until it was acquired by Keysight in October 2025.

== History ==
The company was founded by Jack Bowthorpe in 1936 as Goodliffe Electric Supplies. In 1949 it changed its name to Bowthorpe. It acquired Optima Electronics in 1987 and disposed of its defence businesses in 1990.

The company's electronics business grew rapidly during the dot-com boom of the 1990s, with the 1995 purchase of Telecom Analysis Systems (located in Eatontown, New Jersey) and the 1997 purchase of businesses such as Adtech, a digital test equipment concern based in Hawaii.

It disposed of its automotive industry businesses in 1999, the same year that it bought Netcom Systems, a US telecoms testing business which makes network equipment testers, and DLS, a Canadian telecoms testing business.

In 2000 it also bought Hekimian, a major Operations Support Systems business, Zarak Systems, another communications software business and Net-Hopper, an access systems specialist.

In 2000 it changed its name to Spirent. The name is derived from the words "inspired innovation."

It acquired Caw Networks, a Santa Clara company which makes network performance testing appliances including Avalanche, in 2002, Scientific Software Engineering, a United States–based developer of software including Landslide for testing the performance and functionality of wireless network infrastructure, in 2006, Imperfect Networks, an IDS/IPS testing company, in 2006, and Fanfare Software, a United States–based developer of the iTest automation software, in 2011.

It went on to buy Mu Dynamics, a Sunnyvale company which makes cloud and app testing products such as Blitz, and Metrico Wireless, a company involved in mobile device performance analytics for wireless service providers, OEMs and corporate enterprises based in Frederick, Maryland, in 2012.

In July 2014, Spirent acquired Radvision's Technology Business Unit from Avaya. Radvision, a company based in Tel Aviv, Israel, offers development and test suites for voice and video over IP communications.

In September 2014, Spirent announced that it acquired Mobilethink A/S and its wholly owned subsidiary, Tweakker ApS, a provider of mobile device management for mobile operators.

In March 2016, Spirent announced that it had acquired Testing Technologies, a developer of test automation software for the automotive and IoT industries based in Berlin.

In July 2017, both the Tel Aviv operations and Mobilethink were divested by way of a management buyout into a separate company, Softil.

In March 2021, Spirent acquired octoScope, a company based in Littleton, Massachusetts that offers solutions for automated Wi-Fi and 5G testing in emulated real-world environments.

In September 2023, Spirent acquired the Test Lab Automation business of Netscout Systems.

The board of the company accepted a £1 billion takeover offer from Viavi Solutions in March 2024, but was subsequently outbid by Keysight with a £1.16 billion offer later that month. This led Spirent to withdraw its support for the Viavi deal and recommend Keysight's offer. The takeover was completed in October 2025.

== Operations ==
Spirent Communications PLC is a communications and network testing company. Spirent mainly consists of the former Consultronics (later DLS Testworks) (of Ottawa, Ontario), Netcom Systems (of Chatsworth, California and later Calabasas, California), Adtech (of Honolulu, Hawaii), Zarak Systems (of Sunnyvale, California), Caw Networks (of San Jose, California), Hekimian (of Rockville, Maryland), Telecom Analysis Systems (of Eatontown, New Jersey) in 1995, Global Simulation Systems (of Paignton, Devon) in 1997, DLS (of Ottawa, Ontario) in 1998 and a number of other small network test equipment providers that it has acquired such as Imperfect Networks (of Burlington, Massachusetts).
