= Business support system =

Business tool

Business support systems (BSS) are the components that a telecommunications service provider (or telco) uses to run its business operations towards customers.

Together with operations support systems (OSS), they are used to support various end-to-end telecommunication services (e.g., telephone services). BSS and OSS have their own data and service responsibilities. The two systems together are abbreviated in various ways, such as OSS/BSS, BSS/OSS, B/OSS, BSSOSS, OSSBSS or BOSS. Some commentators and analysts take a network-up approach to these systems (hence OSS/BSS) and others take a business-down approach (hence BSS/OSS).

The initialism BSS is also used in a singular form to refer to all the business support systems, viewed as a whole system.

== Role ==
BSS deals with the taking of orders, payment issues, revenues, etc. It supports four processes: product management, order management, revenue management and customer management.

=== Product management ===
Product management supports product development, the sales and management of products, offers and bundles to businesses and mass-market customers. Product management regularly includes offering cross-product discounts, appropriate pricing and managing how products relate to one another.

=== Customer management ===
Service providers require a single view of the customer and regularly need to support complex hierarchies across customer-facing applications (customer relationship management). Customer management also covers requirements for partner management and 24x7 web-based customer self-service. Customer management can also be thought of as full-fledged customer relationship management systems implemented to help customer care agents handle the customers in a better and more informed manner.

=== Revenue management ===
Revenue management focuses on billing, charging and settlement. It includes billing for consumer, enterprise and wholesale services, including interconnect and roaming. This includes billing mediation systems, bill generation and bill presentment. Revenue management may also include fraud management and revenue assurance. In recent years, operators have started using automation and artificial intelligence in revenue management to detect anomalies, predict payment behavior, and streamline billing operations. These approaches aim to reduce revenue leakage and improve operational efficiency.

=== Order management ===
Order management encompasses four areas:

- Order decomposition details the rules for decomposing a Sales Order into multiple work orders or service orders. For example, a Triple Play Telco Sales order with three services - landline, Internet and wireless - can be broken down into three sub-orders, one for each line of business. Each of the sub-orders will be fulfilled separately in its own provisioning systems. However, there may be dependencies in each sub-order; e.g., an Internet sub-order can be fulfilled only when the landline has been successfully installed, provisioned and activated at the customer premises.

- Order orchestration is an objective application which is used by telcos to precisely manage, process and handle their customer orders across a multiple fulfillment and order capture network. It helps in the data aggregation transversely from assorted order capture and order fulfillment systems and delivers an all-inclusive platform for customer order management. It has been in vast application in the recent times, due to its advanced and precise order information efficiency and low order fulfillment costs, thus aggregating lesser manual process, and faster output. Its radical exception response based functioning and proactive monitoring enables it to centralize order data in accurate manner with ease.

- Order fallout, also known as Order Failure, refers to the condition when an order fails during processing. The order fallout occurs due to multiple scenarios; such as downstream system failure, which relates to an internal non-data related error; or when the system receives incorrect or missing data, which subsequently fails the order. Other Order Fallout conditions include database failure or error pertaining to network connectivity. Validation or recognition of order also occurs, in which the system marks the received corrupted order from an external system as failed. Another Order Fallout condition refers to the state of run-time failure, wherein an order is inhibited from getting processed due to non-determined reliance. Order Fallout Management helps in complete resolve of order failures through detection, notification and recovery process, helping the order to process sustain-ably and precisely.

- Order status management

Order management as a beginning of assurance is normally associated with OSS, although BSS is often the business driver for fulfillment management and order provisioning.

== See also ==
- Business Process Framework (eTOM)
- Operations, administration and management (OAM)
