= TM Forum =

Industry association for telecommunications companies

- Predecessor: OSI/Network Management Forum; TeleManagement Forum; IPsphere Forum
- Formation: 1988; 37 years ago
- Type: Non-profit
- Key people: Nik Willetts (CEO); Rachel Yoxen (CFO); Steffen Roehn (Chairman of the Board)
- Website: www.tmforum.org

TM Forum is a global industry association for service providers and their suppliers in the telecommunications industry. Members include communications and digital service providers, telephone companies, cable operators, network operators, cloud providers, digital infrastructure providers, software suppliers, equipment suppliers, systems integrators, and management consultancies. The Forum has 800+ member companies (including the world's 10 largest telecommunications service providers) that collectively generate US$ 2 trillion in revenue and serve 5 billion customers across 111 countries.

== History ==
TM Forum was founded as the OSI/Network Management Forum in 1988 by eight companies to collaboratively solve systems and operational management issues with the OSI protocols. In 1998 the name was changed to the TeleManagement Forum. In 2008, the organization changed its name to TM Forum.

== Conferences & Events ==
TM Forum hosts a variety of digital and in-person events year-round.

In September 2022, TM Forum held its first in-person event post Covid-19 pandemic when Digital Transformation World (DTW) 2022 opened doors at the Bella Center, Copenhagen.

- DTW23 - Ignite returned to Copenhagen 19–21 September 2023 and DTW24 - Ignite is back in Copenhagen 18-20 June 2024
- DTW Asia 2023 took place in Tokyo in Jan 2024. Mumbai and Indonesia are next in March 2024
- Accelerate is a collaborative event where members come together to work with like-minded peers and industry experts on projects covering AI, data analytics, customer experience management, digital ecosystems, Open APIs, and more. TM Forum hosts both in person and virtual Accelerate events throughout the year.
- TM Forum Local events are networking events held in locations around the world.
- Digital Leadership Summits are invitation-only workshops held in locations around the world.
