= Aryt Industries =

Israeli holding company

Aryt Industries Ltd.
- Native name: ארית תעשיות בע"מ
- Type: Public company
- Traded as: TASE: ARYT
- Industry: Arms industry
- Founded: May 1979; 47 years ago
- Founders: David Kolitz
- Headquarters: Or Yehuda, Israel
- Key people: Zvi Levi (Chairman); Haim Stapler (CEO)
- Products: Electronic fuzes, electro-optical systems
- Revenue: NIS 524 million (2025)
- Operating income: NIS 323 million (2025)
- Net income: NIS 347 million (2025)
- Total equity: NIS 1.05 billion (2025)
- Website: www.arytltd.com

Aryt Industries Ltd. (Hebrew: ארית תעשיות בע"מ) is an Israeli holding company active, through its subsidiaries, in the development, manufacture and marketing of electronic fuzes and electro-optical systems for the defense market. Most of the company's business is carried out through its subsidiary Reshef Technologies Ltd. Aryt is a public company traded on the Tel Aviv Stock Exchange under the ticker ARYT.

Beginning with Russia's invasion of Ukraine in 2022 and accelerating after the outbreak of the Gaza war in October 2023, global demand for artillery munitions drove a sharp rise in Aryt's revenue, order backlog and share price, turning the previously little known Sderot based manufacturer into one of the best performing stocks on the Tel Aviv Stock Exchange.

== History ==
=== Founding and early years (1979–1989) ===
The company was incorporated in Israel in May 1979 as a private company under the name "Ranly Investments Ltd." It began operating in 1981 under the name "Aryt Optical Industries Ltd.", designing and manufacturing electro-optical components for the civilian and military electro-optics industry at a plant in Jerusalem. The company was founded on the initiative of the Koor Industries concern and businessman David Kolitz, who were its principal shareholders at the time. At the end of 1982 the company completed an initial public offering and began trading on the Tel Aviv Stock Exchange. Brigadier General (res.) Moshe "Musa" Peled was appointed CEO. The company acquired a 33% stake in Ophir Optics (later Ophir Optronics) and established a US subsidiary, Diamond Electro Optics.

In February 1986 the company was renamed "Aryt Optronic Industries Ltd." That April it raised $6 million through a share offering in the United States, where it traded over-the-counter. At the end of 1988, the operations of Aryt Optronic Industries and Ophir Optics were merged under joint management at a single site in the Har Hotzvim industrial park in Jerusalem.

=== Change of business focus (1989–1992) ===
In October 1989 David Kolitz purchased, for $1.65 million, the 20% stake in Aryt held by the Koor concern. Roughly two months later he sold control of Aryt to a company called "Yishtak" for about $5 million. A series of transactions followed with an investment company called "Geotek", which held several civilian and defense companies in Israel and the United States. Aryt's own industrial activity effectively ceased around this time, and from 1991 most of its assets consisted of shares and convertible bonds in Geotek.

During 1992 Aryt acquired two military technology companies from Geotek, Reshef Technologies and Jericho Precision, and changed its name to its current form, "Aryt Industries Ltd."

=== 1993–2007 ===
Control of the company changed hands several times over the following years: to the investment company Evergreen (1993), to T.A.T Technologies (1994–95), and to businessman Benny Shabtai and his family (1997). In 1993 Aryt co-founded "Telegate", a developer of cable network telephony and data technology, which was sold in January 2000 for stock worth about $135 million, of which Aryt's share was roughly $30 million. The company also cycled through a series of unsuccessful diversification attempts in medicine and high tech in the early 2000s (including Sigmed, Elscintech, Sensotech and "Voice Diary"), all of which failed by 2002, and briefly held a stake in Ophir Optics and other shell companies.

In 2007 businessman Zvi Levi acquired control of the company for approximately NIS 5 million, and has held a controlling stake ever since.

=== Recovery and growth of the fuze business (2010–2022) ===
Aryt's core business today derives almost entirely from Reshef Technologies, which was founded in 1984 by Yoram Oron and Yaron Eitan and manufactures electronic fuzes for artillery shells, mortar bombs, tank rounds, rocket artillery and loitering munitions at a plant in Sderot. The Sderot plant, opened in 1988, repeatedly faced closure threats over the following decades amid fluctuating defense orders, including a full shutdown announcement in 2003 that was reversed after new Ministry of Defense orders were received.

In 2009 Reshef signed its first cooperation agreement with India's state owned defense electronics company Bharat Electronics (BEL) to supply fuzes to the Indian Army, though substantial orders did not begin until 2016. Reshef also helped BEL set up its own electronic fuze assembly line in India.

=== Rapid expansion (2023–2026) ===
Aryt's revenue and share price began rising sharply after it won an Indian Ministry of Defense tender in March 2023, worth an estimated $170–190 million over ten years, to supply about 500,000 artillery fuzes per year.

Demand accelerated further following the 7 October 2023 attacks and the ensuing Gaza war, as the Israel Defense Forces increased procurement of artillery munitions. The plant's order backlog grew from about NIS 220 million in November 2023 to NIS 430 million in August 2024 and NIS 700 million by November 2024, after Aryt received a NIS 310 million order from a North American customer for delivery in 2025. The company leased additional buildings near its Sderot plant, added production lines and significantly expanded its workforce to meet demand.

By late 2024 Aryt had also signed a further ten year agreement with Bharat Electronics guaranteeing about $20 million in annual revenue, and had begun exploring distribution partnerships in Europe, including a memorandum of understanding with a Danish company.

For full year 2025, Aryt reported revenue of approximately NIS 525 million (about $168 million), an increase of more than 300% from 2024, and net profit of NIS 346.8 million (about $111 million), roughly six times the prior year's figure; gross margin rose to 69% of sales, up from 56% in 2024, and the order backlog reached about NIS 785 million. About 60% of 2025 sales were generated internationally and 40% in Israel; the company also announced it had completed development of a locally manufactured battery for its fuzes, reducing reliance on imported components after wartime supply disruptions, and said it was developing an advanced fuze for precision loitering munitions led by Brig. Gen. (res.) Zvika Haimovitz.

By early 2025 Aryt's market capitalization had risen to roughly NIS 2.1-2.2 billion, up from about NIS 5-14 million when Levi acquired control in 2006-2007, with the stock delivering a cumulative return reported at roughly 2,650% over the three years following Russia's invasion of Ukraine.

=== 2026 insider trading investigation ===
In February 2026 investigators from the Israel Securities Authority searched the offices of Aryt Industries and Reshef Technologies over suspicions that a senior investment executive had traded shares using leaked insider information; the company denied wrongdoing, and its share price fell following the reports. At the time, Aryt's market value was reported at approximately NIS 6.2 billion (about $2 billion), and Chairman Zvi Levi's stake was reported at 39%.

== Operations ==
Aryt's principal business is conducted through Reshef Technologies, which develops, manufactures and markets electronic fuzes for artillery, mortar, tank and rocket ammunition, as well as guided munitions, primarily for the Israel Defense Forces and export customers including India. Products include:

- Proximity fuzes for high angle trajectory weapons (mortars, artillery, rockets), which detonate ammunition at a pre-set height above ground
- Time fuzes, which trigger illumination and smoke rounds at a set time after firing, or detonate tank rounds before, at, or beyond a target
- Impact fuzes, which detonate on contact, with or without delay
- Fuzes for precision guided munitions, incorporating communication with the operator to allow in flight mission changes or abort

Reshef and its development partners won the Israel Defense Prize in 2011 for the development of fuzes used in the "Kalanit" artillery shell.
