= Newport Corporation =

Newport Corporation may refer to:

- Newport City Council, of which Newport Corporation was a forerunner
  - Newport Bus, also known as Newport Corporation Transport
- Newport Corporation (company), a supplier of scientific equipment
