= Meir Nir =

Renowned Israeli architect

Meir Nir מאיר ניר
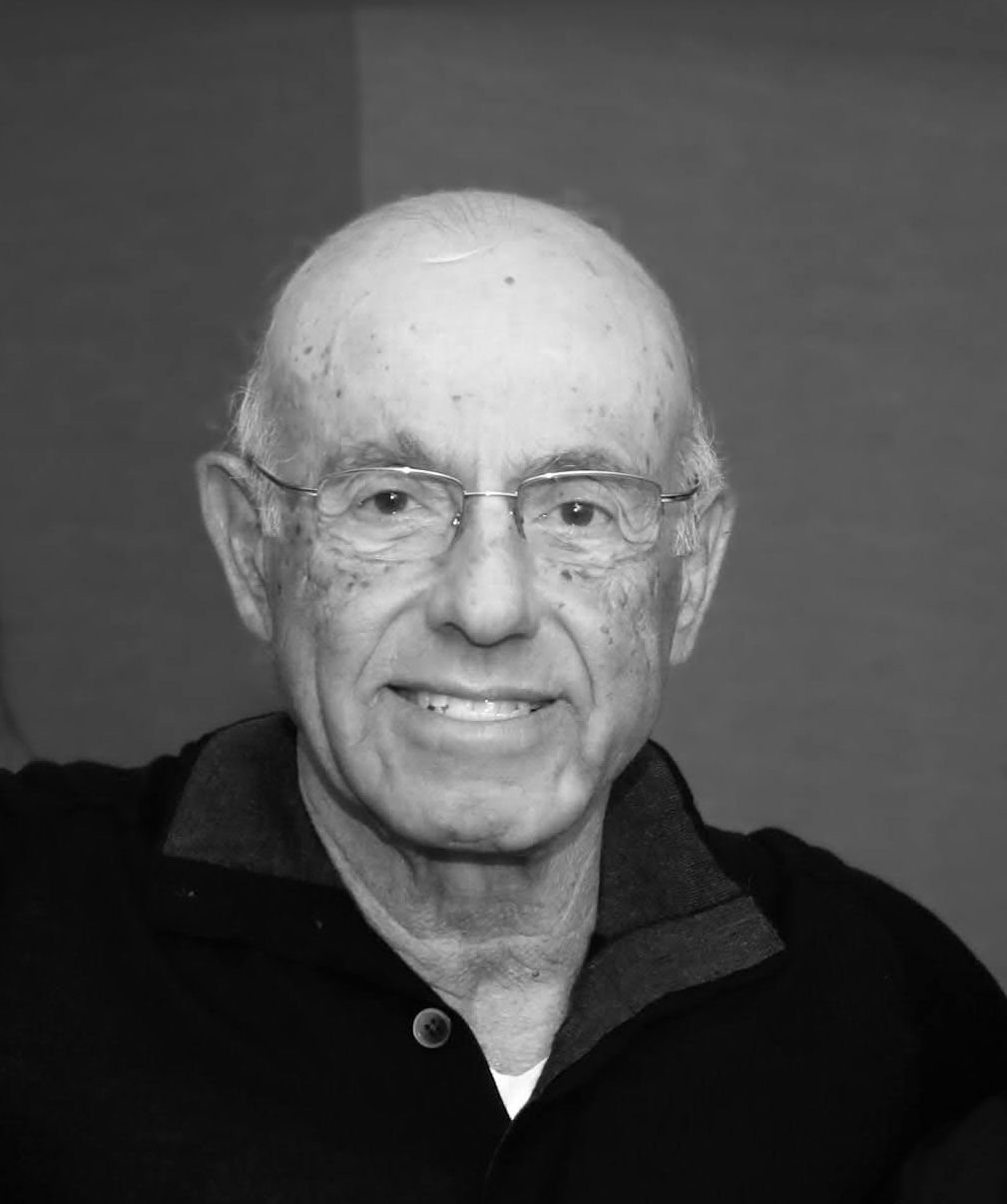
- Born: Alexandria, Egypt
- Education: Technion-Israel Institute of Technology
- Occupation: Architect
- Spouse: Heichick Nir
- Children: 2
- Practice: Meir Nir Architects & Town Planners
- Buildings: RAD Bynet Building, Ben Gurion International Airport – Terminal 4, Caps-Pharma Capsule Factory, Ichud Shivat Zion Synagogue and Community Center
- Website: www.instagram.com/meirnirarchitect

Meir Nir (Hebrew: מאיר ניר; born September 4, 1939) is an Israeli architect renowned for designing public buildings across Israel and internationally from the early 1960s to 2020.

== Early life and education ==
Meir Nir was born in Alexandria, Egypt, and immigrated to Israel with his parents and four siblings in 1946. The family settled on Lassalle Street in Tel Aviv, near the Ben-Gurion House, the private residence of Israel's first Prime Minister, David Ben-Gurion. Nir attended the Gretz School in Tel Aviv (1946–1954) and later studied at Ironi Alef High School.

After graduating from high school in 1958, Nir served in the Nahal Brigade of the Israel Defense Forces for three years. Following his military service, he enrolled at the Faculty of Architecture and Town Planning at the Technion–Israel Institute of Technology. During his studies, Nir gained national recognition for his designs. In 1963, he won second prize in a national competition to design the Soldier's House (Beit HaHayal) in Haifa. Later, in his final year, Nir and his colleague Markus Noldi secured first prize in a competition to design the Ichud Shivat Zion Synagogue and Community Center in Tel Aviv.

== Career ==
Nir graduated from the Technion in 1965 and co-founded an architectural firm with Markus Noldi. In 1967, their design for Rogozin High School in Tel Aviv earned first prize in a national competition. In 1970, Nir established his independent practice, where he designed numerous projects for private, governmental, and public-sector clients, including the Israel Ministry of Construction and Housing, the Jewish Agency, the Israel Airports Authority, and the Tel Aviv-Yafo Municipality.

Nir's architectural philosophy emphasized functional, minimalist designs inspired by Ludwig Mies van der Rohe's "Less is more" principle. His work seamlessly blended geometric aesthetics with functionalism.

From 1989 to 1993, Nir served as Acting Chairman of the Association of Architects and Urban Planners in Israel, playing a pivotal role in advancing the profession. His career, spanning over six decades, earned him multiple awards and widespread recognition before his retirement in 2020.

== Personal life ==
Meir Nir resides in Tel Aviv with his wife, Heichik Nir, a sculpture teacher and founding member of the art department at the Tel Aviv School of Arts. They are the parents of artist Uri Nir and designer Michal Nir.

== Selected works ==
- RAD Bynet Building (Mount Hotzvim, Jerusalem)
- Ben Gurion International Airport, Terminal 4
- Caps-Pharma Capsule Factory (Mount Hotzvim, Jerusalem)
- Ichud Shivat Zion Synagogue and Community Center (Tel Aviv)

== Gallery ==
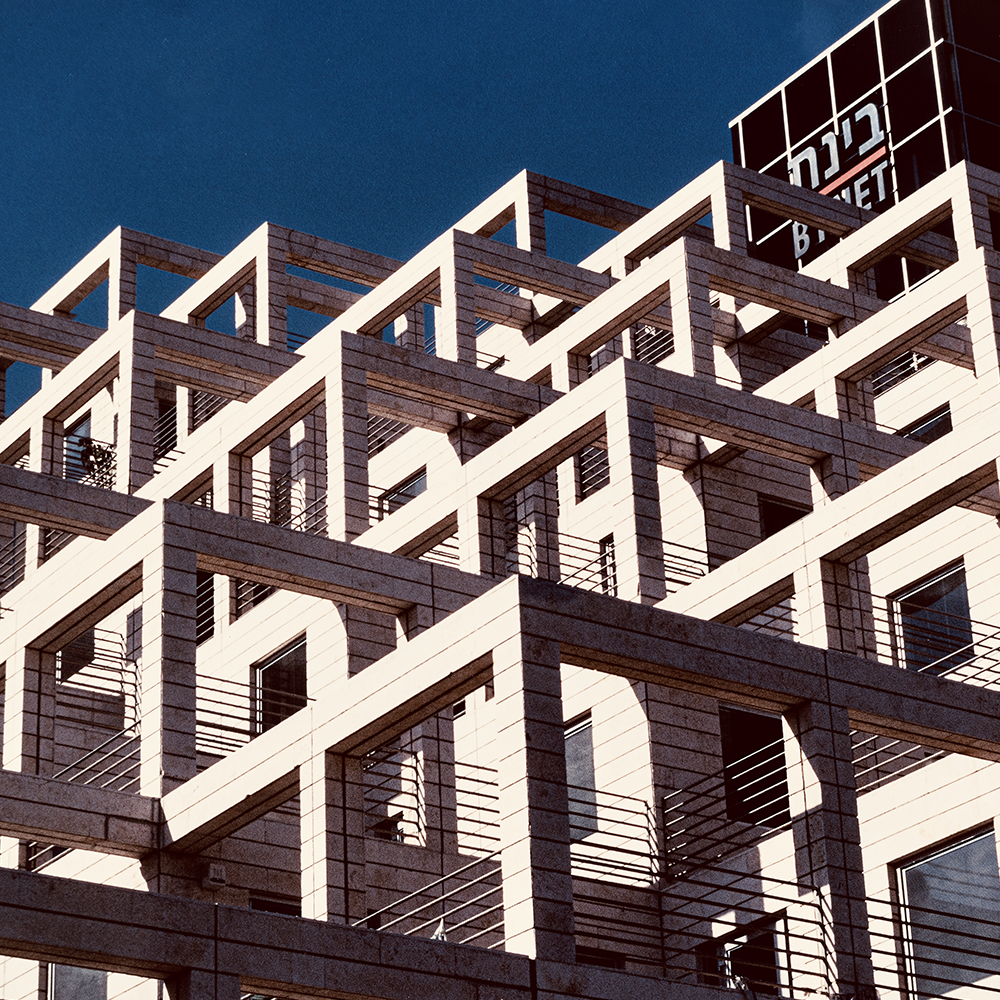
Rad Bynet Building, Mount Hotzvim, Jerusalem

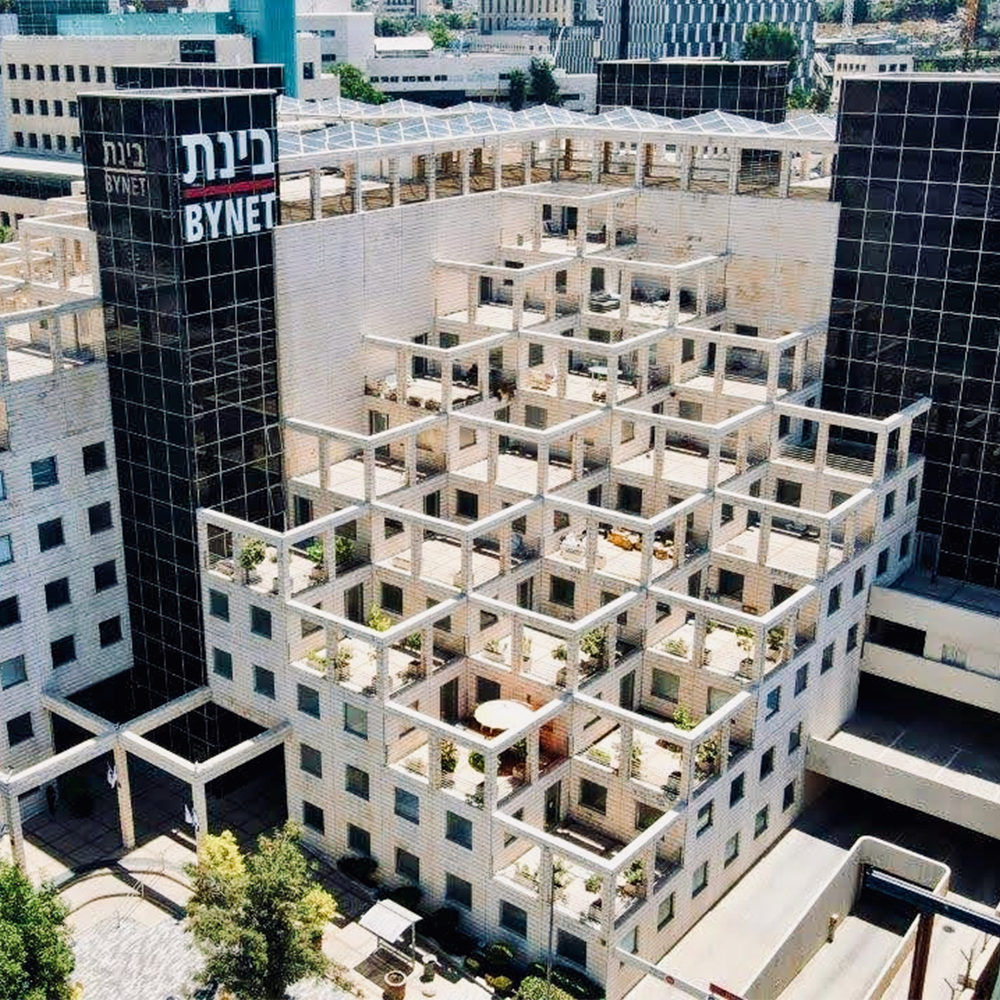
Rad Bynet Building, Mount Hotzvim, Jerusalem

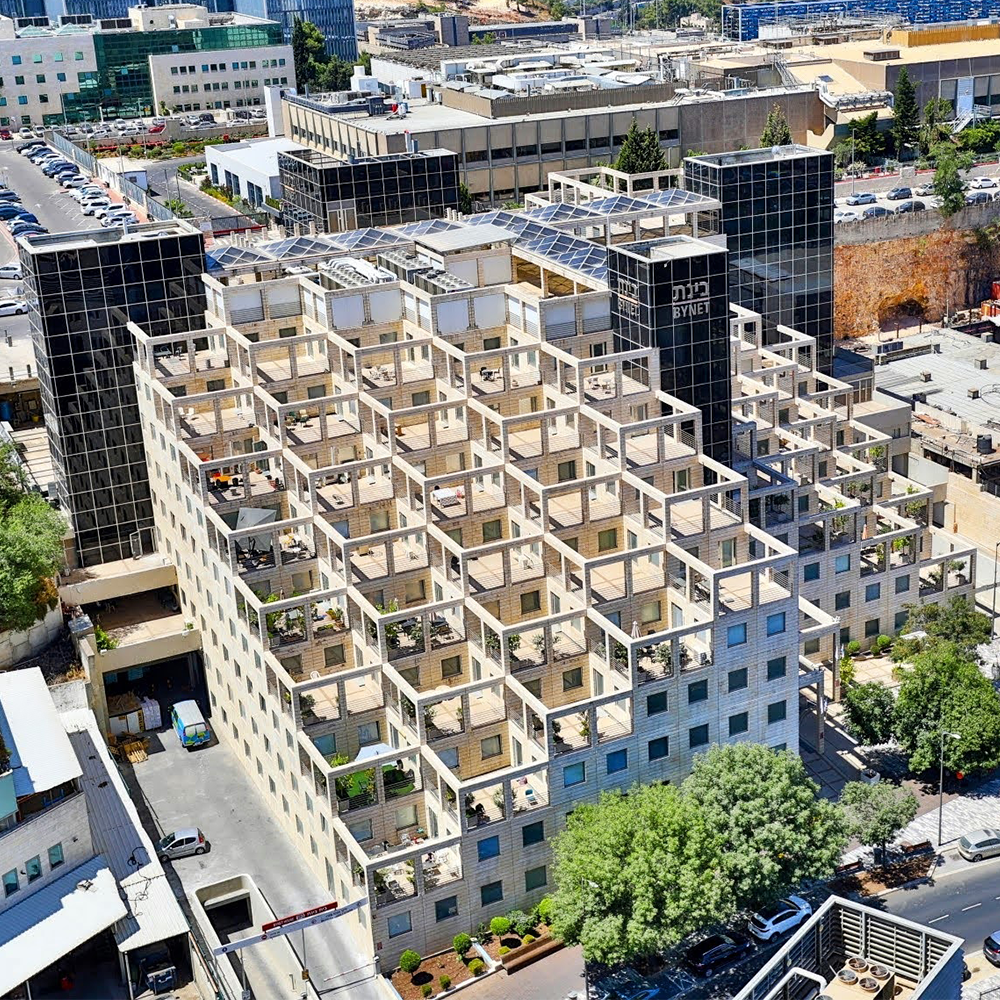
Rad Bynet Building, Mount Hotzvim, Jerusalem

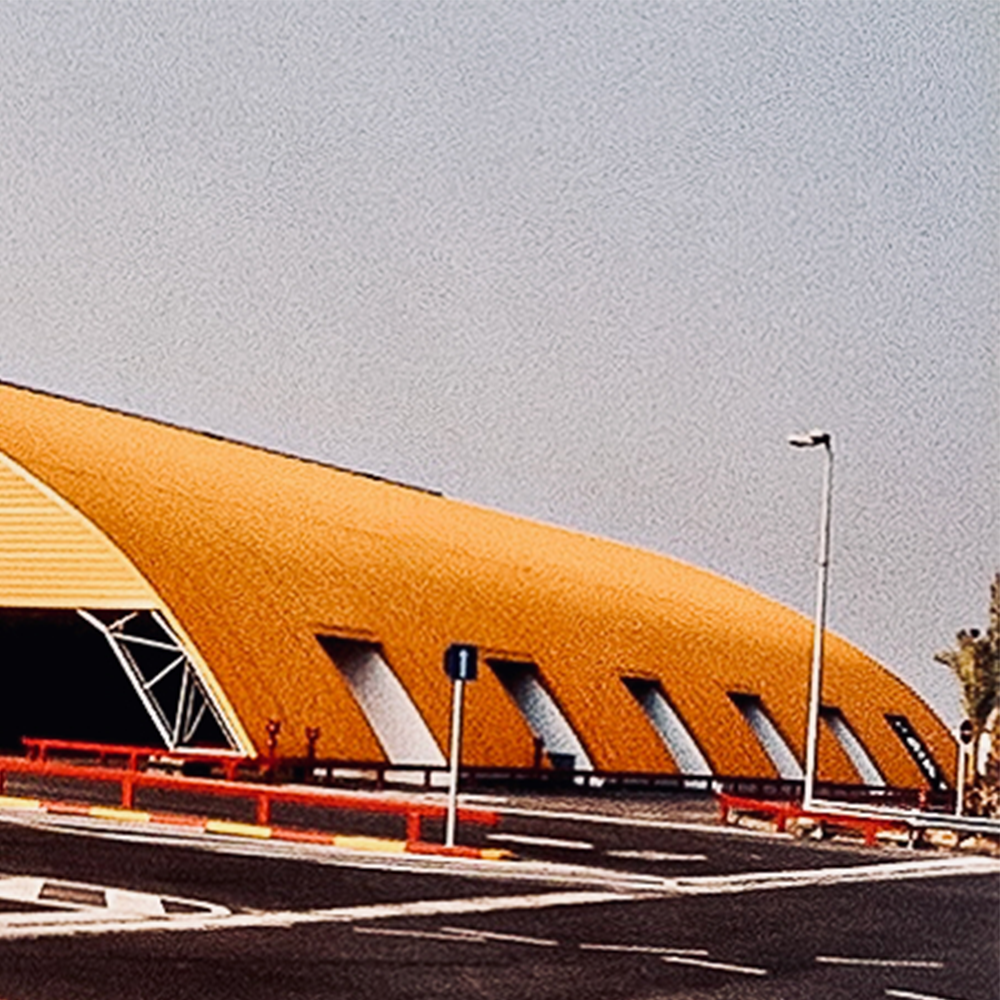
Ben Gurion International Airport, Terminal 4

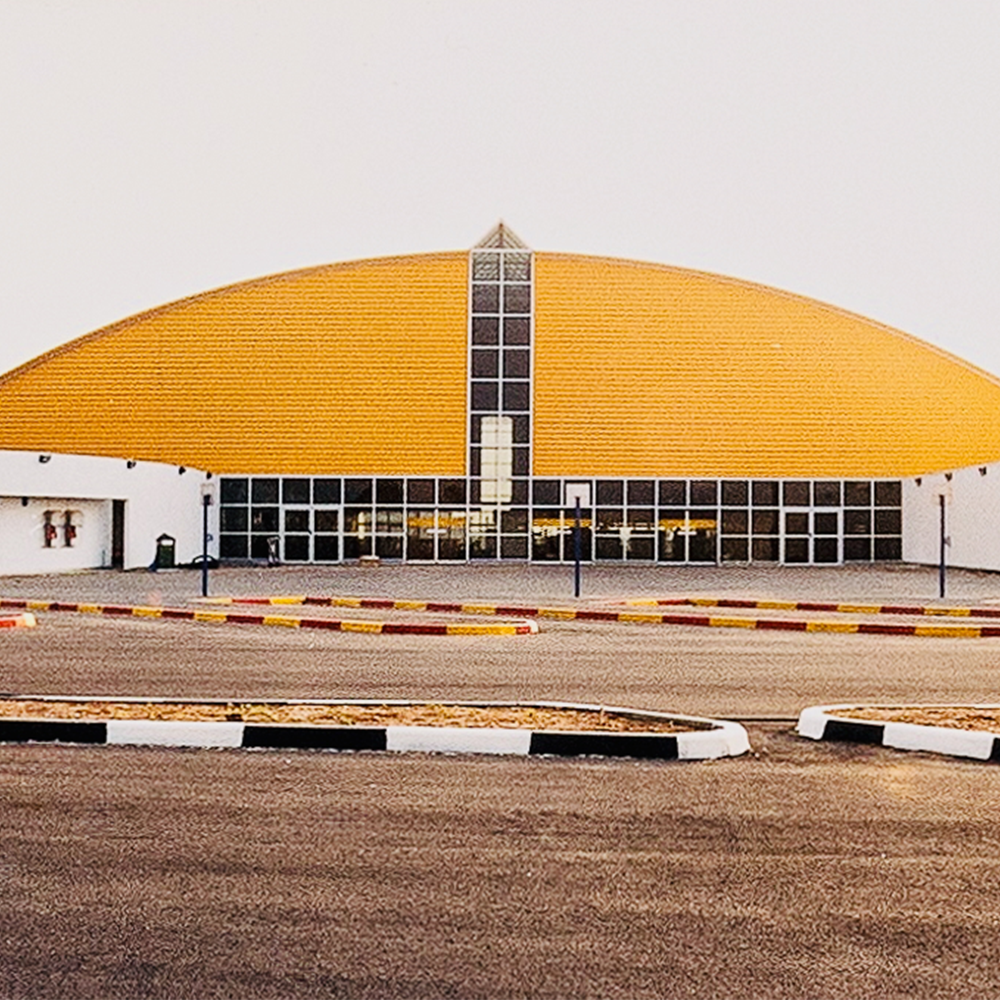
Ben Gurion International Airport, Terminal 4

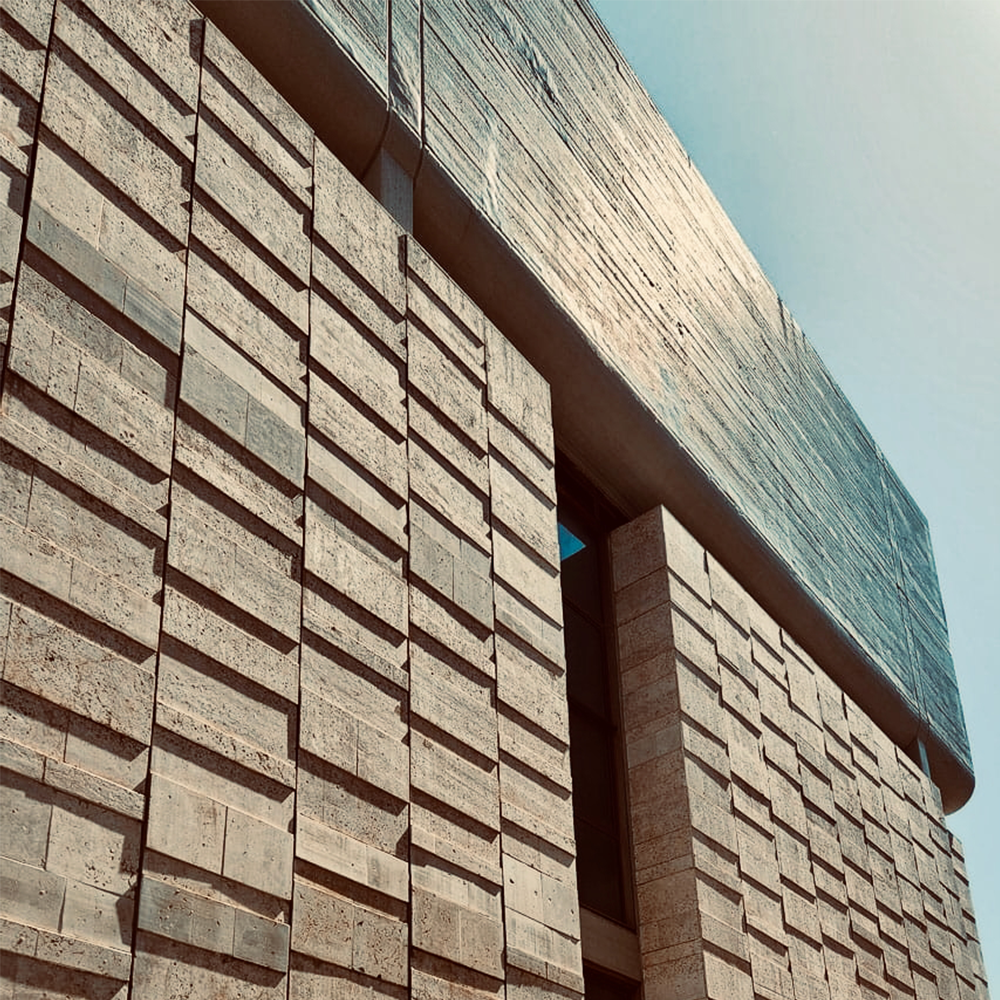
Ichud Shivat Zion Synagogue and Community Center, Tel Aviv

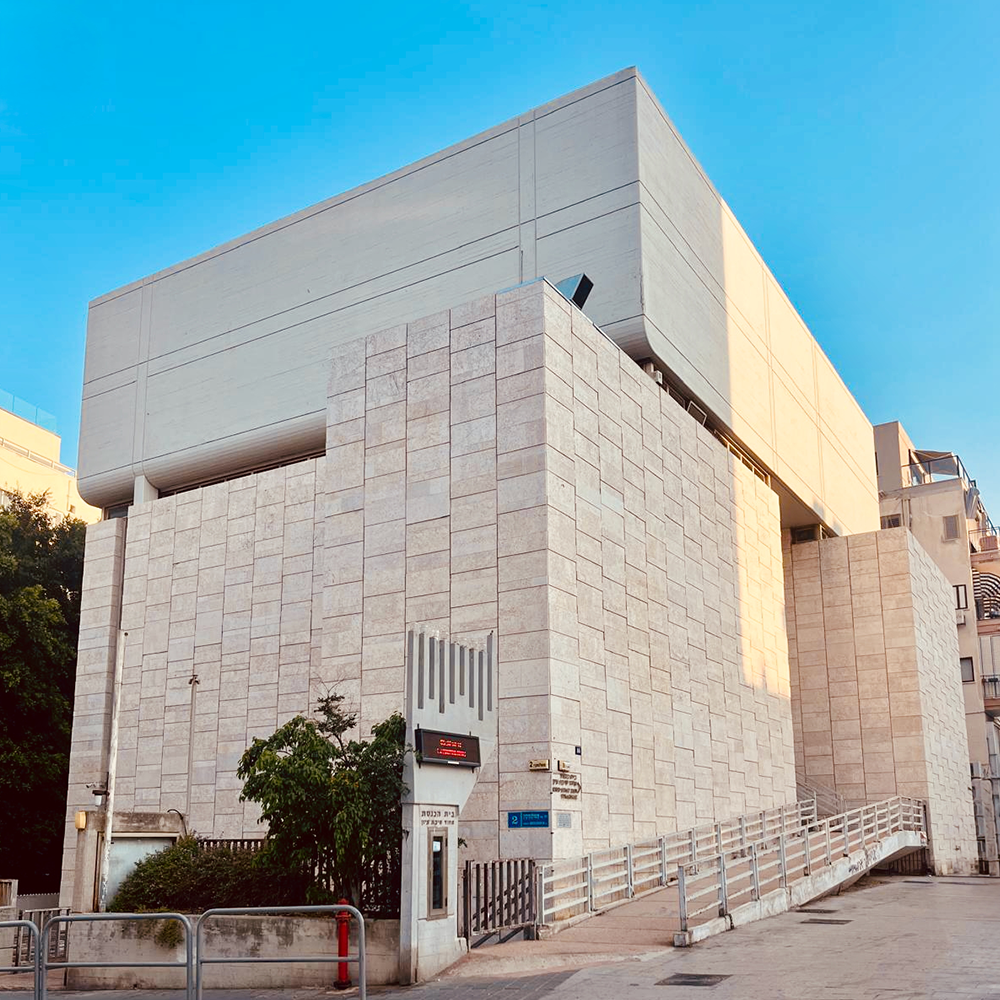
Ichud Shivat Zion Synagogue and Community Center, Tel Aviv

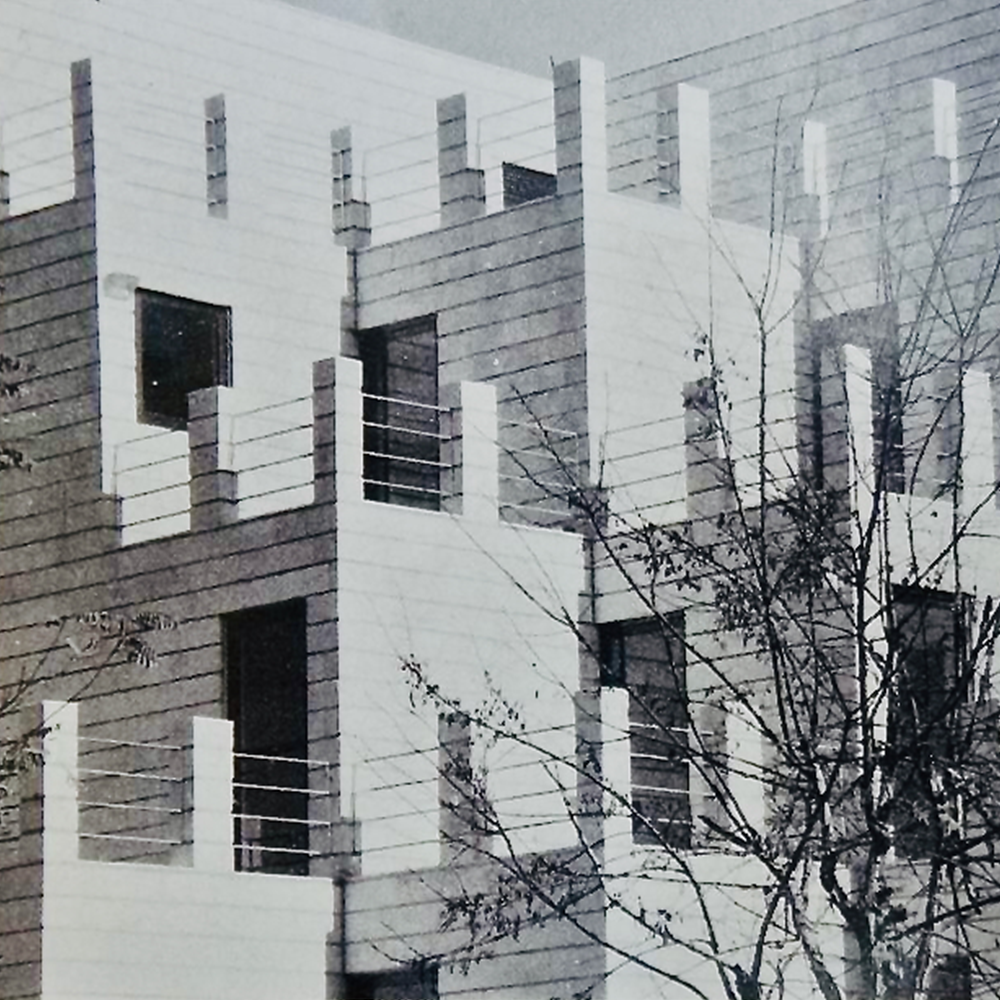
Caps-Pharma Capsule Factory, Mount Hotzvim, Jerusalem

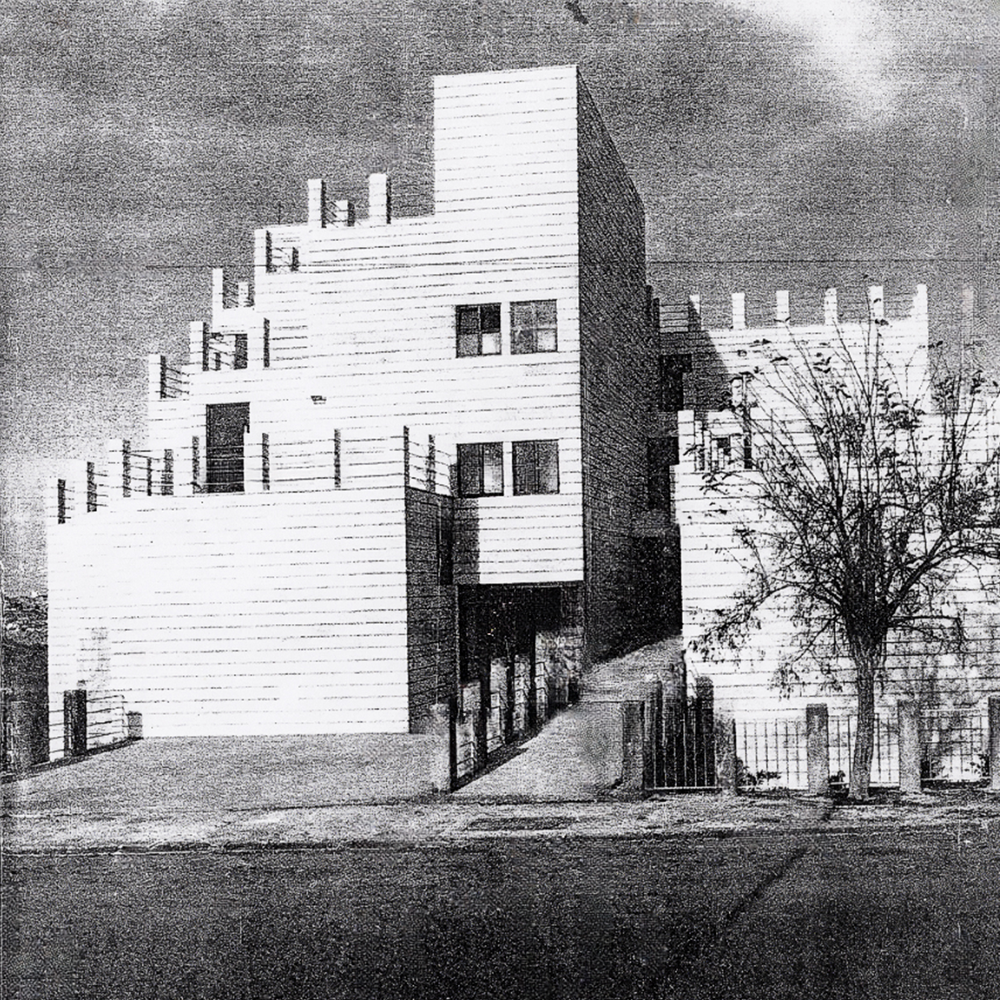
Caps-Pharma Capsule Factory, Mount Hotzvim, Jerusalem
