= William J. Rothwell =

American professor

- Born: December 17, 1951 (age 74); Springfield, Illinois
- Occupations: Author; Professor; Coach

Willam J. Rothwell (born on December 17, 1951, in Springfield, IL) is a PhD, SPHR, SHRM-SCP, RODC, CPTD fellow, FLMI, and Distinguished Professor of Workforce Education and Development in the Department of Learning and Performance Systems at Pennsylvania State University. His research includes works in competency modeling, specifically the American Society for Training and Development Competency Model.

Rothwell has conducted research in succession planning, organization development, and instructional design. As a published author, he is widely held in libraries worldwide.

== Education ==
In 1973 Rothwell obtained a BA in English from Illinois State University, Normal, IL. He then acquired a MA in English from the University of Illinois, Urbana-Champaign in 1978. The following year he continued his education at Sangamon State University, now known as the University of Illinois at Springfield and received a M.A.B.A. [Master of Arts in Business Administration] with a concentration in Human Resource Management. Simultaneously, Rothwell was enrolled at the University of Illinois, Urbana-Champaign, where he received his doctorate in education/employee training, also known as training and development or talent development.

== Teaching career ==
In 1993, Rothwell was hired as an Associate Professor of human resource development within Workforce Education and Development at Pennsylvania State University. This program is housed within the Learning and Performance Systems department within Penn State's College of Education. From 2003 to 2006 he acted as Professor in Charge in the Workforce Education and Development Program, during which they received the #1-ranked graduate program in Workforce Development in the United States. Rothwell was awarded the Graduate Faculty Teaching Award at Pennsylvania State University. In 2022 he was named a Distinguished Professor and also received the Global Lifetime Achievement Award at Penn State.

== Research ==
=== Succession planning ===
Rothwell developed a model on Succession planning that is used by human resource professionals and is also included in Canadian Libraries and Librarianship's section on Succession planning From his work on succession planning, Rothwell has broadened his research and practice on the succession topic. One strand of his work examined how succession issues could be examined for knowledge workers Rothwell's work on competencies could also be related to work on succession planning, talent management, and training and development.

== Consultancy/international travels ==
=== Consultancy ===
Rothwell has served as consultant to business, industry, government, and nonprofit organizations, with clients across 35 nations. Clients have included AccuWeather, the American Red Cross, the American Society for Training & Development, Atotech, CARE (the International Relief Agency), the City of Virginia Beach, Conoco, Corning, Ford (Fairlane Center), JLG Industries, LandAmerica, Motorola University U.S., Motorola University China, Singapore Airlines, the University of Pittsburgh Medical Center, the United States Department of Labor and the United States Postal Service

=== International work ===
In partnership with Peking University, Rothwell has been involved with Leadership Development studies through Training and development. The studies focused on four large organizations both locally based or parts of larger global organizations including ABB, BenQ, Lenovo and Motorola. his travels has taken him to Vietnam, where he was able to share his work on local news channel NetViet

== Selected works ==
Rothwell has authored, co-authored, edited, or co-edited a collection of over 300 books, book chapters, and articles including 80+ books.

=== Instructional design ===
1. Rothwell, W. J., & Kazanas, H. C. (2011). Mastering the instructional design process: A systematic approach. John Wiley & Sons.

=== Succession planning ===
1. Rothwell, W.J. (2015), Effective Succession Planning: Ensuring Leadership Continuity and Building Talent from Within, 5th ed., American Management Association, New York, NY

=== Organization development ===
1. Rothwell, W. J., & Sullivan, R. L. (Eds.). (2015). Practicing organization development: A guide for consultants, 4th ed. John Wiley & Sons.

=== Competency-based training ===
1. Rothwell, W. J., & Lindholm, J. E. (1999). Competency identification, modelling and assessment in the USA. International journal of training and development, 3(2), 90–105.

=== Community college leadership development ===
1. Rothwell, W., and Gerity, P. (Eds.). (2008). Cases in linking workforce development to economic development: Community college partnering for training, individual career planning, and community and economic development. Washington: American Association of Community Colleges.
