= IDT Global Israel =

- Company type: Subsidiary of IDT Corporation (until 2008); Private limited company (from 2008)
- Industry: Business process outsourcing solutions
- Founded: 2002; 24 years ago
- Headquarters: Jerusalem, Israel
- Key people: Eli Ninio (CEO)
- Number of employees: 450 (2008)

IDT Global Israel is a multi-lingual contact services company headquartered in Jerusalem, Israel.

Until July 1, 2008, it was a fully owned subsidiary of IDT Corp.; on that date, 80% of the company was sold to its Israeli CEO, Eli Ninio, with 20% remaining in the hands of Howard Jonas' IDT Corp. This was in response to a time of financial struggles within the parent company, which resulted in layoffs of employees working for the Israel branch.

Among the company's customers are Netgear, McAfee, 888.com, and the Israeli political party Shas. Most of the company's projects are not in Hebrew - Israel's primary official language - but rather in various European languages, including English, German, French, Dutch, Spanish and others. Until 2007, American companies were the company's main customers; these included AOL and Knowledge Networks. Since 2008, the company has focused almost exclusively on the European and Israeli markets.

The company's main location is in a Har Hotzvim office building which is shared with the Israeli branch of NDS Group. A smaller office is located in the Tel Aviv neighborhood Ramat HaHayal.

== See also ==
- Economy of Israel
