= MKS Instruments =

American technology company

MKS Inc.
- Type: Public
- Traded as: Nasdaq: MKSI; S&P 400 component
- ISIN: US55306N1046
- Industry: Semiconductors
- Founded: 1961; 65 years ago
- Headquarters: Andover, Massachusetts, U.S.
- Area served: Worldwide
- Revenue: $3.6B (2024)
- Number of employees: 10,000 (2024)
- Website: www.mks.com

MKS Inc. is a technology company that supplies instruments, subsystems, systems, process control technologies, and specialty chemical products used in manufacturing semiconductor chips, printed circuit board, advanced packaging (semiconductor), and specialty industrial applications. The company also provides chemicals and equipment used for creating decorative and functional surface finishes. The company is headquartered in Andover, Massachusetts, with offices and facilities worldwide.

== History ==
MKS was founded in 1961 by engineers Ken Harrison and John A. Dillon. Both co-founders contributed to the company's first product, the Baratron capacitance manometer, which measures gas pressure within a semiconductor wafer fabrication chamber.

The 1990s saw substantial growth in the semiconductor industry due to the development of more powerful microprocessors and integrated circuits and the adoption of personal computing by consumers and businesses worldwide. MKS capitalized on the demand with advancements in vacuum measurement and control, gas and vapor delivery, and process monitoring solutions. The company expanded its global presence by establishing new sales and service offices worldwide to better serve an international customer base and tap into emerging markets in Europe and Asia.

In 1999, the company undertook an initial public offering (IPO). MKS went public on the NASDAQ stock exchange.

In 2000, MKS acquired California-based Spectra International, LLC, a designer and manufacturer of mass spectrometer and optical spectrometer-based process monitoring products used in the semiconductor, thin film coatings and advanced materials processing industries, for $9.7 million in cash.

In 2001, MKS acquired Applied Science and Technology Inc. (ASTeX), a supplier of sputtering equipment and other products, for $300 million in stock.

In 2002, MKS acquired Emerson Electric Company's ENI Division, a supplier of solid-state radio frequency (RF) and direct current (DC) plasma power supplies, matching networks and instrumentation for $288 million in stock.

Umetrics, a privately held Swedish supplier of multivariate data analysis and design of experiments software, was purchased by MKS in 2008.

In 2010, MKS purchased Granville-Phillips from Azenta for $87 million. Granville-Phillips is a provider of vacuum measurement and control instruments for the thin film, semiconductor, and general industrial markets.

In 2012, Plasmart, a South Korean supplier of RF plasma systems was acquired by MKS.

In 2016, MKS acquired Newport Corporation in an all-cash leveraged buyout valued at approximately $980 million, more than doubling its addressable market. The deal included Newport's subsidiaries, Spectra-Physics and Ophir Optronics, providers of photonics and optics products.

In 2019, Electro Scientific Industries (ESI) was acquired by MKS for $1 billion, in a deal announced in late 2018. ESI is a provider of laser micro-machining, laser-based advanced manufacturing systems, and photonic-based precision equipment used in PCB manufacturing.

As of 2021, sixty percent of the company's sales were from semiconductor products.

In 2022, MKS acquired Atotech, a German tech company, for approximately $4.4 billion in cash and MKS common stock. Atotech is a supplier of specialty chemicals and surface finishing technologies.

== Patents ==
As of 2024, MKS holds 750 active patents. A sample of MKS' key patents are below.

1. Baratron^{®} Capacitance Manometer (U.S. Patent No. 3,509,775) Issued: April 28, 1970, this patent covers the fundamental technology for the Baratron capacitance manometer.
2. Gas Flow Control System (U.S. Patent No. 5,711,105) Issued: January 27, 1998, this patent describes a system for accurately controlling gas flow in vacuum processes. Accurate gas flow control is vital for maintaining process consistency and yield in semiconductor manufacturing.
3. Laser Beam Delivery System (U.S. Patent No. 6,208,417) Issued: March 27, 2001, this patent covers technology related to the precise delivery of laser beams for applications in materials processing, medical devices, and scientific research.
4. Surface Finishing Technology (U.S. Patent No. 9,073,652) Issued: July 7, 2015, this patent involves advanced plating chemistries and equipment used in surface finishing for electronics and automotive applications.
5. Plasma Source and Methods (U.S. Patent No. 10,505,348) Issued: December 17, 2019, this patent involves innovations related to plasma generation and control for processes such as etching and deposition in semiconductor fabrication.

== Sustainability ==
In December 2023, MKS announced it had committed to reducing its combined Scope 1 and 2 emissions by 42% by 2030 from its 2022 baseline, according to criteria established by the Science Based Targets initiative (SBTi).

=== Indexed with ===
- PHLX Semiconductor Sector
- S&P 400
- Russell 1000 Index
