= Atotech =

Speciality chemicals and equipment company

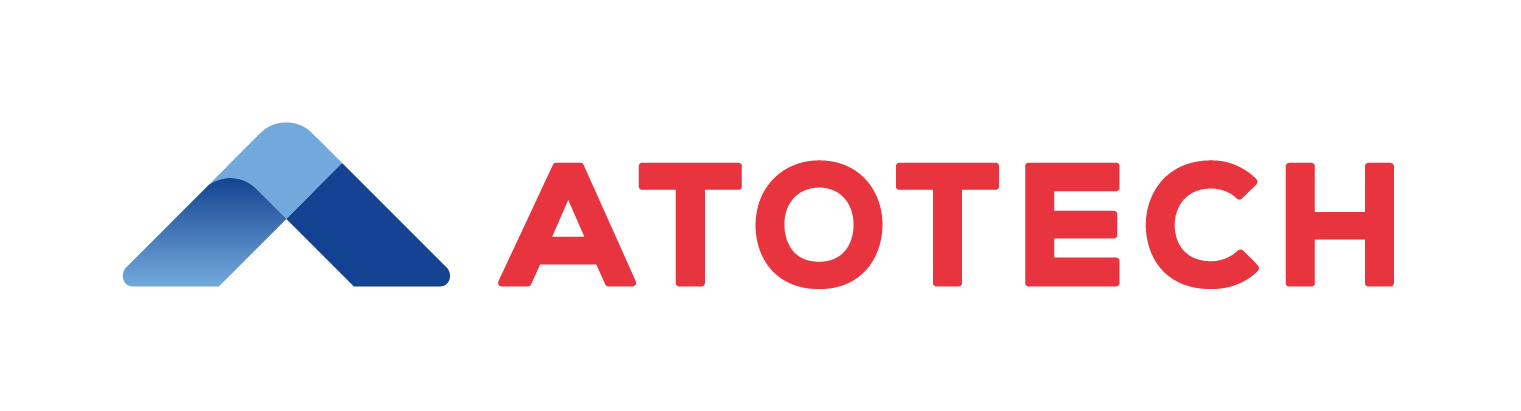

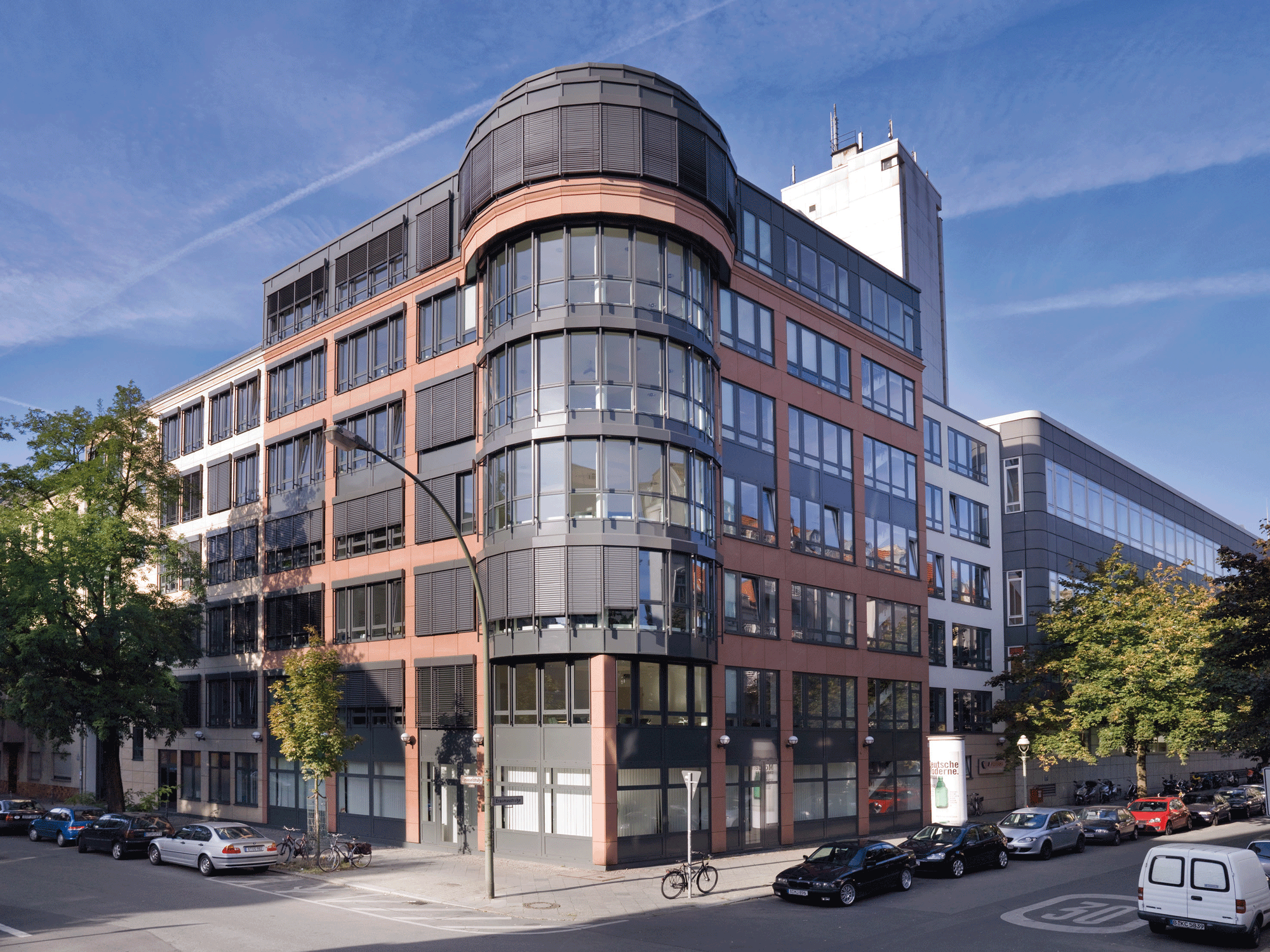
- Atotech head office Berlin
- Type: Public
- Traded as: NYSE: ATC
- Industry: Chemical industry
- Predecessor: Elf ATOChem (Aquitaine Total Organico) and M & T Harshaw
- Founded: 1993 in Berlin, Germany
- Headquarters: Berlin, Germany, Erasmusstrasse 20, 10553
- Area served: Worldwide
- Key people: Geoff Wild (CEO); Peter Frauenknecht (CFO); Harald Ahnert (President Electronics); Gertjan van der Wal (President General Metal Finishing); Brian Daniels (Vice President R&D)
- Products: Specialty chemicals, equipment and services used in the production of smartphones, communications infrastructure, cloud-computing infrastructure; and in automotive surface finishing and other general industrial end-markets
- Owner: MKS Instruments
- Number of employees: Approximately 4,000 (2020)
- Website: www.atotech.com

Atotech is a German speciality chemicals and equipment company that operates in 40 countries. It provides chemistry and equipment for companies that manufacture printed circuit boards, IC-substrates and semiconductors; and also provides specialty chemicals and equipment for decorative and functional surface finishing in the automotive, construction, furniture and other industries.

The company is composed of two main business units: Electronics and General Metal Finishing. Of the over 4,000 employees, approximately 56% are in Asia; 35% are in Europe; and 9% are in the Americas. The company owns approximately 2,300 patents. The company has manufacturing, technology centers, and sales and service sites in over 40 countries, including Germany, Czech Republic, Slovenia, Spain, China, Korea, Taiwan, Singapore, India, Japan, United States, Canada, Mexico and Brazil. Its headquarters is in Berlin, Germany.

Atotech was founded in 1993, when ELFAtochem merged its M&T Harshaw operations with the electroplating division of Schering AG. Major competitors of Atotech are the US-based companies Element Solutions, DuPont, and the French company Coventya.

== History ==
Atotech traces its origins to Grüne Apotheke founded in Berlin in 1851 by Ernst Christian Friedrich Schering.

In 1901, the electroplating division was launched. It produced salt mixtures for storing metals with the brand name Trisalyt. In 1927, Chemische Fabrik auf Actien (vorm E. Schering) merged with CAF Kahlbaum Chemische Fabrik GmbH to create Schering-Kahlbaum AG (known as Schering AG after 1937).

In 1936, the electroplating division developed the first “fast” electrolyte – Copper Trisalyt Extra Rapid – as well as the world's first gloss surface bath, called 'Brilliant.' The success of these innovations led to the establishment of the first department for electroplating.

In 1951, Schering AG started its electroplating division in Feucht, Germany, where Atotech had its main equipment production site. In 1989, the electroplating division moved to a new location in Berlin, Germany.

In 1993, Schering AG sold its electroplating division to the French chemical company ELF Atochem. Subsequently, ELFAtochem merged its subsidiary M&T Harshaw with the newly acquired electroplating division from Schering AG and founded Atotech Deutschland GmbH.

The company established factories and service centers in Germany. Later, manufacturing and service networks were launched across Europe, Asia, and subsequently in the Americas.

At the end of 2016, Atotech was sold by Total to The Carlyle Group.

In March 2017, Geoff Wild was appointed as CEO of Atotech. The company's CFO is Peter Frauenknecht. John Stephenson heads the operations of the Group as COO. Josh McMorrow is Group General Counsel for Atotech.

On February 4, 2021, Atotech went public with an IPO on the New York Stock Exchange under the ticker name "ATC".

In July 2021, MKS Instruments agreed to purchase Atotech for $5.1 billion in cash-and stock deal. MKS completed the acquisition in August 2022, and Atotech's shares were delisted from the New York Stock Exchange. The Atotech business became the Materials Solutions Division of MKS.

== Structure ==
Atotech has two core business segments. These are electronics (printed circuit boards and semi-conductors) and general metal finishing, (for automobiles, construction, furniture and more). The company provides custom-made integrated production systems and local service to its customers worldwide.

== Products ==
Atotech provides specialty chemical processes and equipment for the

- Printed circuit board industry
- Package substrate industry
- Semiconductor industry
- Decorative and functional surface finishing industry (decorative coatings, corrosion protection coatings, electroless nickel, hard chrome, functional electronic coatings)
