= Ophir Optronics =

Multinational optronics solutions corporation

Ophir Optronics Solutions, Inc.
- Type: Public (NASDAQ: MKS)
- Industry: Optronics solutions
- Founded: 1976; 50 years ago
- Headquarters: Jerusalem, Israel
- Area served: Worldwide
- Key people: Kobi Lasri, Reuven Silverman
- Products: Laser measurement instruments, infrared optics, optics for fiber and CO_{2} lasers, 3D non-contact measurement
- Number of employees: 360
- Website: ophiropt.com

Ophir Optronics Solutions is a multinational company that sells optronics solutions. The company develops, manufactures and markets infrared (IR) optics and laser measurement equipment. Founded in 1976, in Jerusalem, Israel, as a developer and manufacturer of precision infrared optics and laser measurement instrumentation. The company initially focused on producing optical components and measurement tools for industrial and defense applications and was traded on the Tel Aviv Stock Exchange from 1991 until it was acquired, and was a constituent of its Tel-tech index. Headquartered in the Har Hotzvim industrial park in Jerusalem, Israel Ophir owns a 100,000-square-foot (9,300 m^{2}) complex that includes the group's main production plant. Ophir has additional production plants in North Andover, Massachusetts and Logan, Utah in the US and sales offices in the US, Japan and Europe.

In 2006, Ophir acquired Spiricon Group, a US-based company in the beam-profiling market. Ophir's sales increased sharply from $45 million in 2005 to $74 million in 2007. During 2007, Ophir established a Swiss-based subsidiary (Ophir Optics Europe GmbH) to market lenses and components for surveillance and imaging systems in Europe. In May 2010, Ophir acquired Photon Inc., another US-based beam-profiling company. Newport Corporation, a global supplier in photonics solutions, completed its acquisition of the Ophir company in October 2011. In 2016, metrology firm MKS Instruments bought Newport Corporation, including the Ophir brand, for $980 million.

Ophir was publicly traded on the Tel Aviv Stock Exchange from 1991 until 2011, when it was acquired by Newport Corporation, a global supplier of photonics solutions. In 2016, Newport—and by extension, Ophir—was acquired by MKS Instruments, Inc., for $980 million integrating Ophir into MKS's Photonics Solutions Division. As of August 2025, Ophir operates as a division of MKS Inc, with manufacturing and R&D facilities in Israel, the United States, Romania and India.

In 2017, Ophir Optronics, Ophir Optics Group, released the LightIR range of infrared thermal imaging zoom lenses, designed for UAVs, drones, and handheld devices. At Eurosatory 2018, Ophir introduced another infrared thermal imaging lens to the range, the LightIR 15-75mm f/1.2, for uncooled 10–12-μm-pixel-size long–wave infrared (LWIR) detectors. In 2019, Ophir expanded its family of cooled MWIR long range lenses, adding 900mm and 1350mm FLs, for use in aviation and observation systems.

In January 2020, Ophir's SupIR 50-1350mm f/5.5, an MWIR long range lens for thermal imaging cameras, was named a 2020 SPIE's PRISM Awards finalist in the category of Safety and Security.

== Products and technology ==
Ophir develops and manufactures infrared optics in the MWIR, LWIR and SWIR wavelengths, including both zoom and single field-of-view lenses for security surveillance and observation systems. In 2025, the company launched MWIR zoom lenses with folded optics designed for long-range imaging in compact formats. In 2023, Ophir introduced its first SWIR & NIR 25–250 mm continuous zoom lens as a low-SWaP (Size, Weight, and Power) design covering 700–1700 nm. This lens has a 10× zoom range, weighs approximately 860 g, and is used with small-pixel SWIR detectors in drones, coastal surveillance, and defense applications.

The company's laser optics division manufactures components for CO_{2} and 1 μm (fiber) laser systems employed in industrial cutting, welding, and marking. Ophir also produces laser power and energy meters capable of measuring outputs from femtowatts to hundreds of kilowatts, and from picojoules to kilojoules, covering both continuous wave and pulsed sources. Its beam profilers and analysis systems measure beam shape, size, divergence, and energy distribution, including BeamSquared (m^{2}) measurement, using CMOS and InGaAs sensors that detect wavelengths from UV to far infrared. The company also produces spectral measurement instruments for verifying laser wavelength and spectral content, as well as software platforms such as BeamGage and StarLab for visualization, logging, automation, and system integration.

Ophir's technologies are developed in-house and calibrated to international standards, including those set by the National Institute of Standards and Technology (NIST).

== Ophir Groups and Subsidiaries ==
The Ophir Photonics Group manufactures, calibrates and sells a complete line of laser measurement instruments for analyzing and measuring laser power, energy, beam profile and spectrum used in industry, telecom, medical and scientific research. Products include reliable and accurate laser power and energy meters, laser beam diagnostic instrumentation, laser measurement tools and spectral analysis instruments, which comply with NIST calibration.

The Infrared Optics Group designs and produces optical lenses and elements for military, security and commercial markets. All manufacturing is done in-house, using automated CNC and patented Diamond Turning technologies. Ophir has expanded its optical and mechanical design department to offer lens assemblies and broadened its product lines to include the design and manufacture of optical elements for CO_{2} high power lasers used in industry for laser cutting and welding machines.

In July 2008, the FIMI fund invested $23.5 million in Ophir in exchange for five million shares of the company and 1.75 million warrants, exercisable within five years at $5.75 each.

In December 2016 Haaretz reported that Ophir Optronics was subject of British intelligence gathering, as it was believed connected to Israeli defense fiber optics systems.

== Global Operations ==
The company maintains production in Har Hotzvim industrial park, with additional facilities in Romania, Massachusetts, and Utah. In 2024, the company opened a new service and assembly hub in Delhi, India, to meet regional demand and support defense projects. In 2024 MKS relocated and expanded its Romania Bucharest site to a 6,500 sqm site manufacturing Ophir Optics product solutions amongst other MKS products.

== Recognition ==
- 2012 – BeamTrack Laser Power/Position/Size Sensors received the R&D 100 Award.
- 2015 – BeamWatch awarded Laser Focus World Industry Award.
- 2016 – Ophir U.S. business unit named Utah Manufacturer of the Year.
- 2018 – BeamWatch AM received Laser Focus World Innovators Award.
- 2020 – Ophir received Supplier Excellence Award and was recognized by Leonardo DRS for Ophir Optics group outstanding performance.
- 2020 – SupIR 50–1350mm f/5.5 MWIR lens finalist in SPIE PRISM Awards.
- 2022 – BeamPeek awarded Silver Honoree Award by Laser Focus World.
