= Kalanit (shell) =

Israeli 120 mm multi-purpose tank cartridge

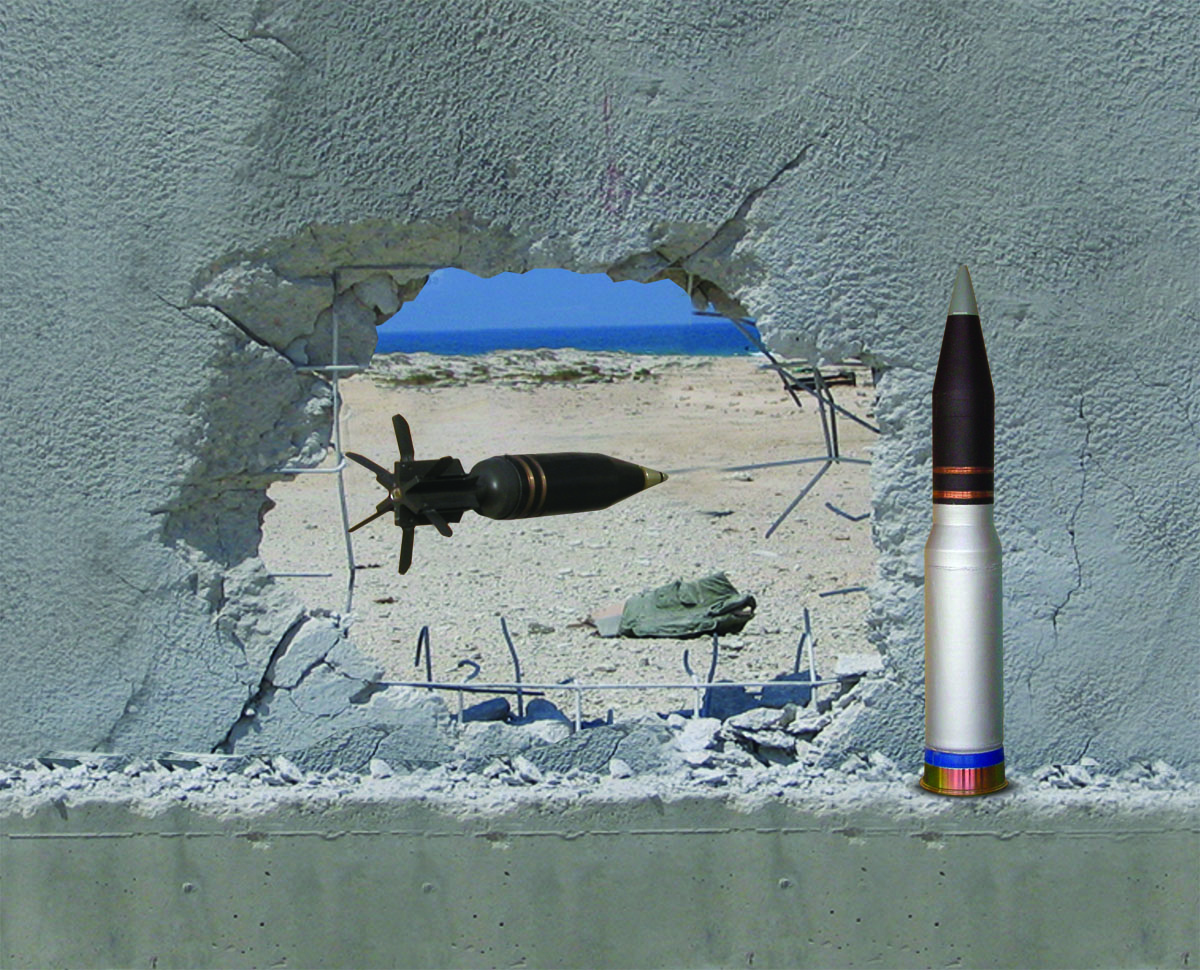
- The 120 mm Kalanit round
- Type: Multi-purpose tank cartridge
- Place of origin: Israel

Service history
- In service: 2009–present
- Used by: Israel Defense Forces
- Wars: Operation Protective Edge

Production history
- Designer: Israel Military Industries
- Manufacturer: Israel Military Industries
- Unit cost: c. NIS 30,000 (2013)
- Produced: 2005–present
- Variants: Rakefet (105 mm); Hatzav

Specifications
- Caliber: 120 mm
- Filling: Six disc-shaped explosive charges
- Detonation mechanism: Programmable fuze, set automatically by the tank's fire-control system

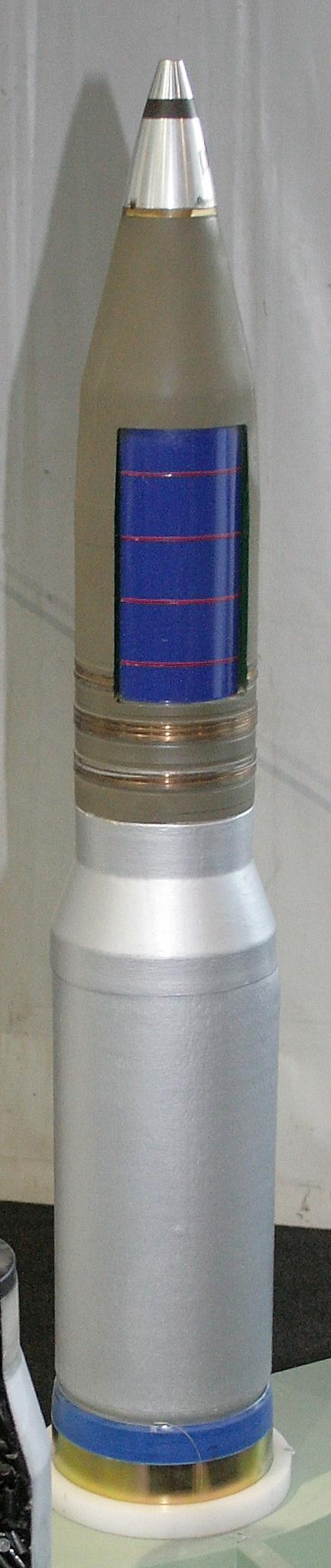
The 120 mm Kalanit projectile at the end of a cartridge case containing the propellant. The cutaway reveals the charges, shown in blue.

The Kalanit (Hebrew: כלנית, romanized: anemone), officially designated the 120mm APAM-MP-T, M329 Cartridge (APAM-MP-T being an acronym for Anti-Personnel Anti-Material Multi-Purpose Tracer), is a multi-purpose tank round (Note: Although tank ammunition is of fixed (unitary) type and is therefore termed a "cartridge" in IDF terminology, the term "shell" has become widespread among the general public for tank ammunition.) manufactured by Israel Military Industries (IMI), intended to provide an answer to the range of threats found on the modern battlefield. The Kalanit is used in tanks with 120 mm guns, such as the Merkava Mark III and Merkava Mark IV. A further version of the round, known as the "Rakefet", is adapted to 105 mm tank guns such as that of the Merkava Mark II, and was developed before the Kalanit. Because the Kalanit serves as tank ammunition, it comes in cartridge form, that is, in a configuration in which the Kalanit projectile is fixed to a combustible cartridge case containing granules of propellant.

Production of the round by IMI began in 2005, and its fuzes are produced by Reshef Technologies of the Arit Industries group.

For its development, the designers of the Kalanit round were awarded the Israel Defense Prize in 2011.

== Mode of operation ==
The Kalanit was designed to serve both as an anti-personnel round and as a high-explosive round, in order to economize on the number of rounds carried and on stowage space within the tank. The projectile contains six disc-shaped explosive charges, and can be fired in three firing modes, which can be set by means of a mechanism located at the tip of the warhead, similarly to the flechette round. The three firing modes are:

1. High-explosive: all six discs detonate on impact with the target. Used against soft targets (Jeeps, APCs, etc.).
2. Anti-personnel: the discs disperse above the target, detonate in the air and scatter a corridor of fragmentation roughly 200 metres long over dug-in infantry. This action overcomes the main drawback of the flechette round, whose darts are fired horizontally and allow troops to take cover.
3. Air-burst fragmentation: for engaging targets inside a structure, exposed infantry or helicopters. The discs are thrown forward beyond the set range and produce fragmentation in a forward direction.

Unlike the Rakefet round, in which the mode of operation had to be entered into the projectile manually, the Kalanit receives the target type automatically from the fire-control system and sets its mode of operation accordingly.

== Israel Defense Prize ==
In 2011, a team from the Israeli Ministry of Defense/MANTAK, Israel Military Industries, Reshef Technologies and the Ground Forces Command was awarded the Israel Defense Prize for the development of the round and its operational implementation. The citation stated that the system gives armoured forces new operational capabilities, embodies advanced technological and engineering capabilities and has already been used operationally; that it contributes to the security of the state; that the Kalanit round represents the cutting edge of tank armament worldwide and can also be used against an enemy sheltering inside a bunker or a structure, against light armoured vehicles and against helicopters, through variable use of the charge contained in the round; that from the point of view of armoured crews this amounts to a single press of a button; and that the development of the Kalanit helps adapt the role of the tank on the modern battlefield from a traditional weapon intended for anti-tank combat into a principal weapon system in ground battles and in urban warfare.

== Operational use ==
The Kalanit round entered service with the Israel Defense Forces during 2009. A Kalanit round successfully destroyed an Egyptian Fahd armoured personnel carrier that had penetrated into Israel during the 2012 Egypt–Israel border attack on 5 August 2012. The Kalanit's first large-scale combat use was in Operation Protective Edge in July–August 2014: during the operation, Merkava tanks of the Israeli Armored Corps fired a significant number of "Kalanit" and "Hatzav" rounds against militants targets. The rounds were used alongside the older HEAT round, which was fired in far greater quantities.

Owing to the high cost of the Kalanit, some NIS 30,000 per round, the Israeli Armored Corps decided also to procure the 120 mm Hatzav round, a downgraded version of the Kalanit costing about half as much.

== Operators ==
- Israel — The Kalanit round entered service during 2010 with the Israeli Armored Corps, aboard Merkava Mark III and Mark IV tanks fitted with the IMI 120 mm gun.
- United States — The United States Army has evaluated the round under the designation XM329.
