= Har Hotzvim =

Industrial park in Jerusalem

Mount Hotzvim
- הַר חוצבים; Har Hotzvim
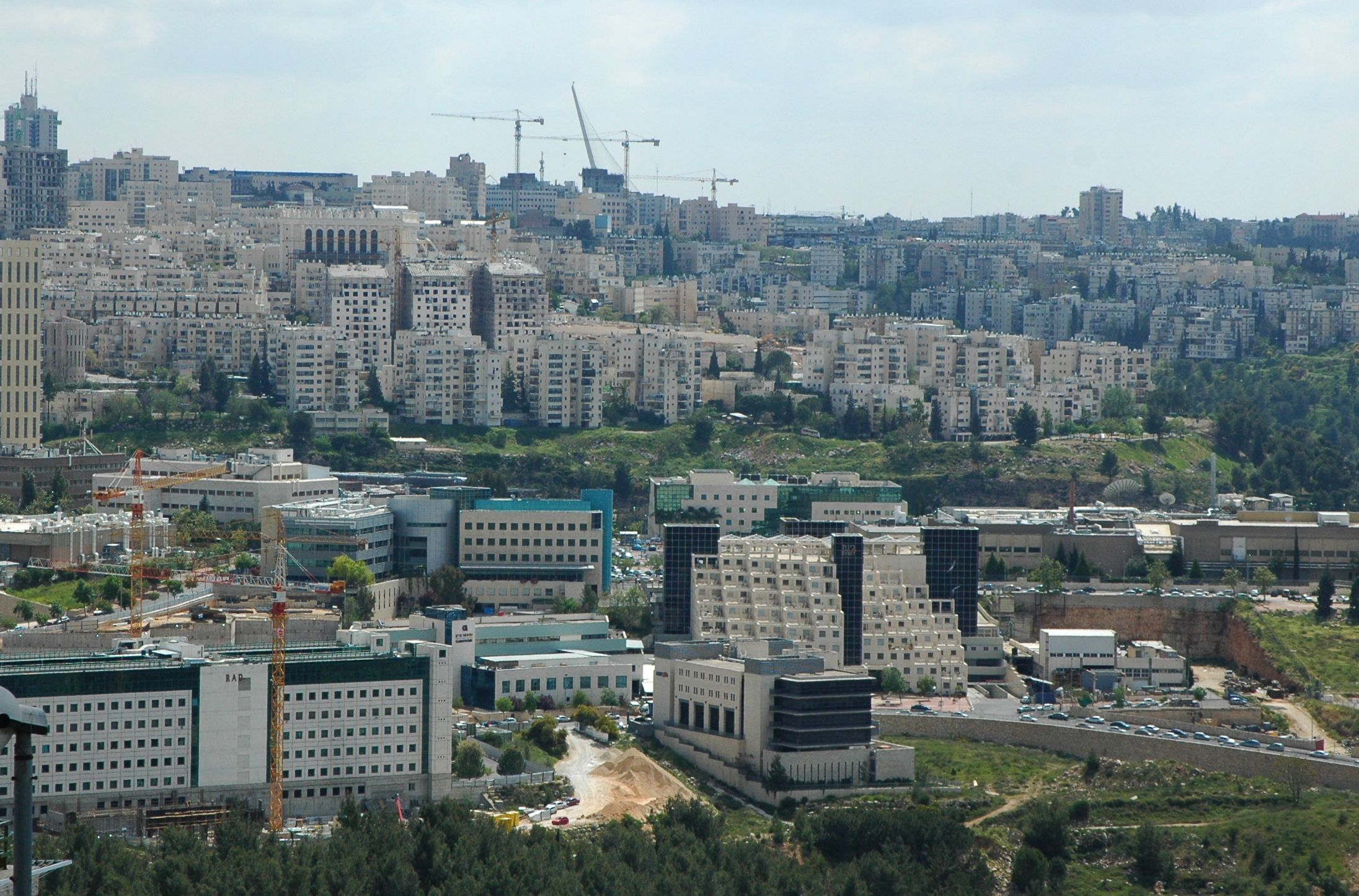
- Har Hotzvim, view from Ramat Shlomo

Highest point
- Elevation: 700 m (2,300 ft)
- Coordinates: 31°48′9.1″N 35°12′34.69″E

Geography
- Location within Jerusalem
- Location: Jerusalem
- Parent range: Judean

Har Hotzvim (Hebrew: הר חוצבים, lit. Stonecutter's Mountain), also Campus of Science-Rich Industries (קריית תעשיות עתירות מדע, Kiryat Ta'asiyot Atirot Mada) is a high-tech industrial park located in northwest Jerusalem. It is the city's main zone for science-based and technology companies, among them Intel, Teva, NDS (now Cisco), RAD Data, Mobileye, Ophir Optronics, Sandvine, Radware, IDT Global Israel, Medtronic, SATEC, Johnson and Johnson and more. In addition to large companies, the park also hosts about 100 small and medium-sized high-tech companies, as well as a technological incubator. In 2011, Har Hotzvim provided employment for 10,000 people.

== History ==
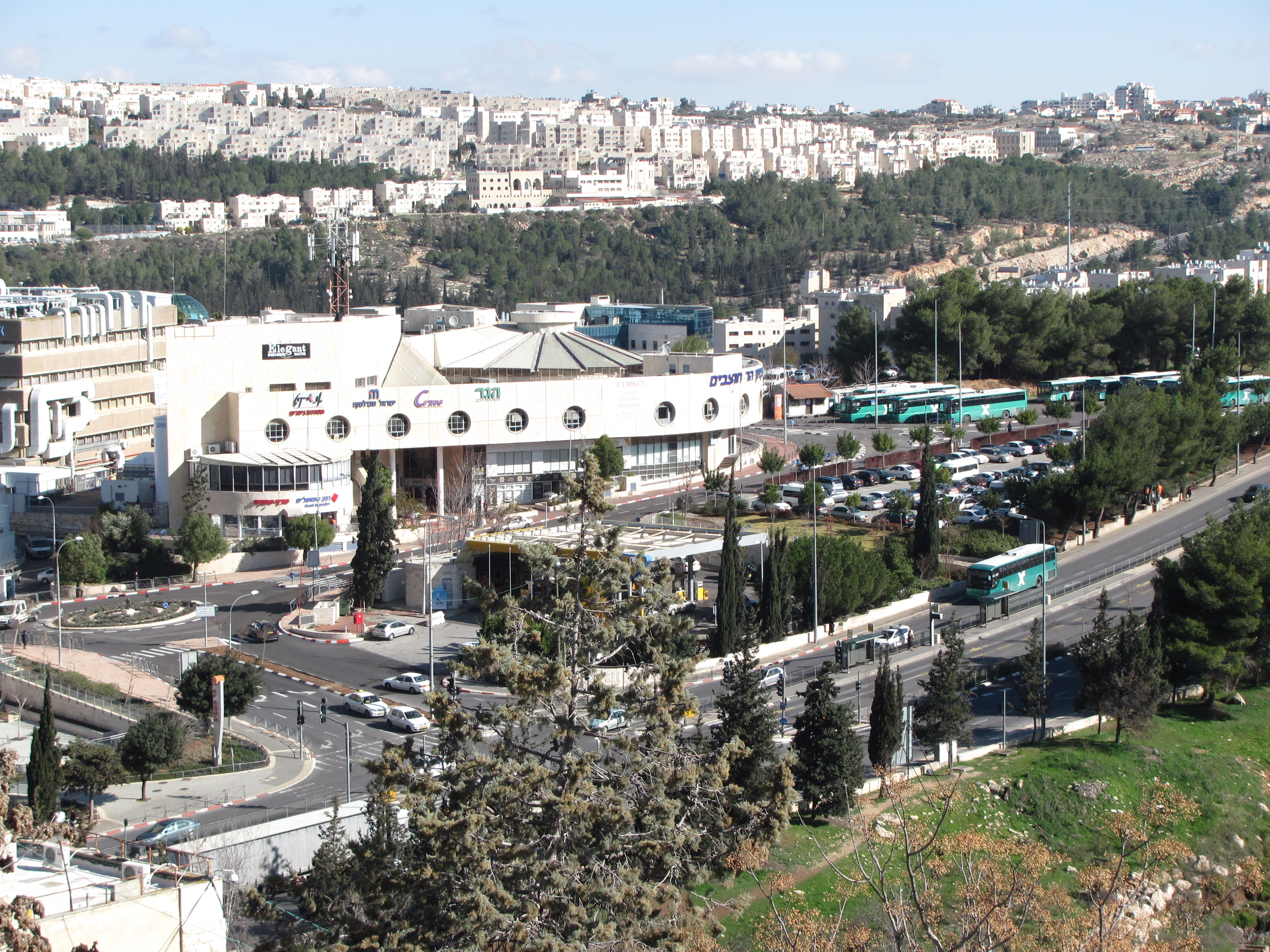
Entrance to Har Hotzvim industrial park and shopping mall

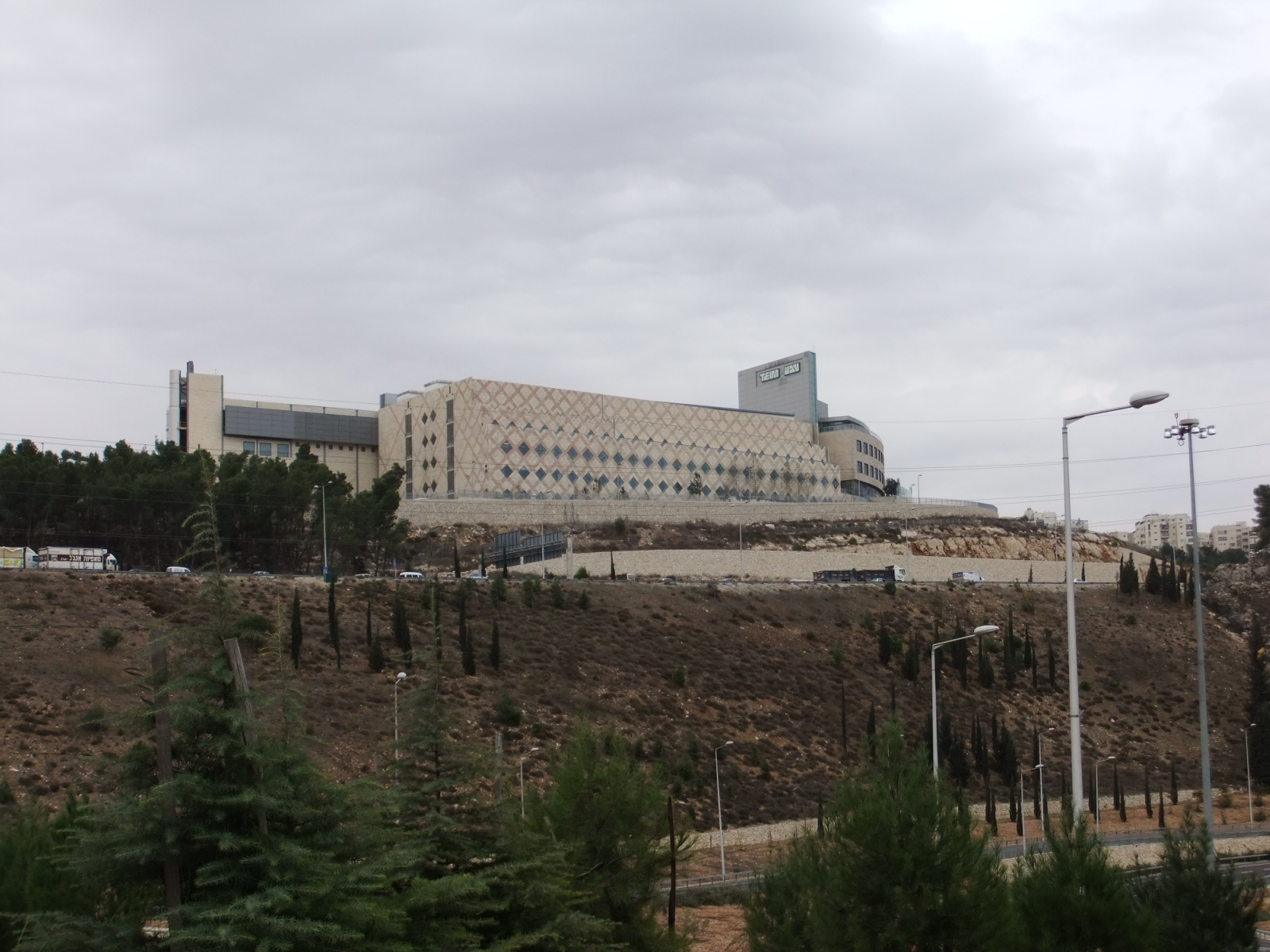
Teva factory at Har Hotzvim

The park was founded in the early 1970s by the Jerusalem Economic Corporation, in order to facilitate the development of a high tech industry in Jerusalem. At the time the location was at the edge of the built up area of the city, but over the years several major roads were built and accessibility to the site was improved; including: the Begin Expressway to the west of the park and Route 9 north of the park. One of the first tenants in the park was Luz Industries an early pioneer of Solar thermal energy, which in the 1980s built the world's largest solar energy generating facility SEGS in the Mojave Desert.

The first major international corporation to establish a base at Har Hotzvim was Intel, which opened its Fab 8 semiconductor manufacturing plant in 1985.

In the early 1990s, as Jerusalem was awarded the status of a preferred development zone for the high-tech industry, an expansion plan was initiated by the Jerusalem Development Authority. The expansion took place in three stage (known as Har Hotzvim stage b, c and d) and by the mid-2000s most of the available plots have been developed.

In 2005, Teva Pharmaceutical Industries opened a new, state-of-the-art pharmaceutical manufacturing plant in Har Hotzvim, at a cost of US$80 million. It initially produced about 4 billion tablets a year, rising to 8 billion a year when the second phase of building was completed.

In 2008 Intel closed its aging Fab 8 chip plant and started converting the facility to a die preparation plant. The plant was inaugurated in November 2009; the company planned to operate it on Saturdays in accordance with its business needs, requiring continuous operation of the production line. This angered the Haredi Jewish community living in nearby religious neighborhoods, who strictly observe the Sabbath laws. For several weeks they gathered every Saturday outside the building; some threw rocks at the building and the police. Eventually representatives of the Haredi community reached an agreement with Intel to keep the plant open on Saturdays, but allow only non-Jews to work.

In July 2011 Haredi United Torah Judaism party in the Jerusalem city council proposed to clear the area for new residential development for their community, an offer that was firmly rejected by Jerusalem's mayor Nir Barkat

In 2015 the Bank of Israel moved its headquarters and activity to the park, due to renovations in its facility in Givat Ram. Towards the end of 2018 several of the bank's divisions returned to the Givat Ram facility.

In June 2020, the Jerusalem District Planning and Building Committee approved the plan for the construction of Road 22, which will connect the Ramot Shlomo Interchange to Har Hotzvim.

At the northern edge of the park are located Jerusalem's veterinarian services.

== Tenants ==
- Intel
- Teva Pharmaceutical Industries
- Radware
- Umoove
- NDS Group (now part of Cisco)
- AVX Corporation
- MRV Communications
- Ericom Software
- SATEC
- PricewaterhouseCoopers
- IDT Global Israel
- Sigma-Aldrich
- Ophir Optronics
- Mobileye
- Sandvine
- RAD Data Communications
- Minicom Advanced Systems
- BAE Systems Rokar
- Ness Technologies
- BrightSource Energy
- Solel Solar Systems
- Digital Fuel
- Oridion
- Mango DSP
- CDI Systems
- Dexcel Pharma
- Gamatronic
- Medinol
- BioLineRx
- Deloitte
- Brainsway
- Matrix
- AccuBeat
- Intec Pharma
- BioMetrix
- Data Technologies
- Omrix (Acquired by Johnson & Johnson)
- MalamTeam
- Compaq
- Wizcom Technologies

== See also ==
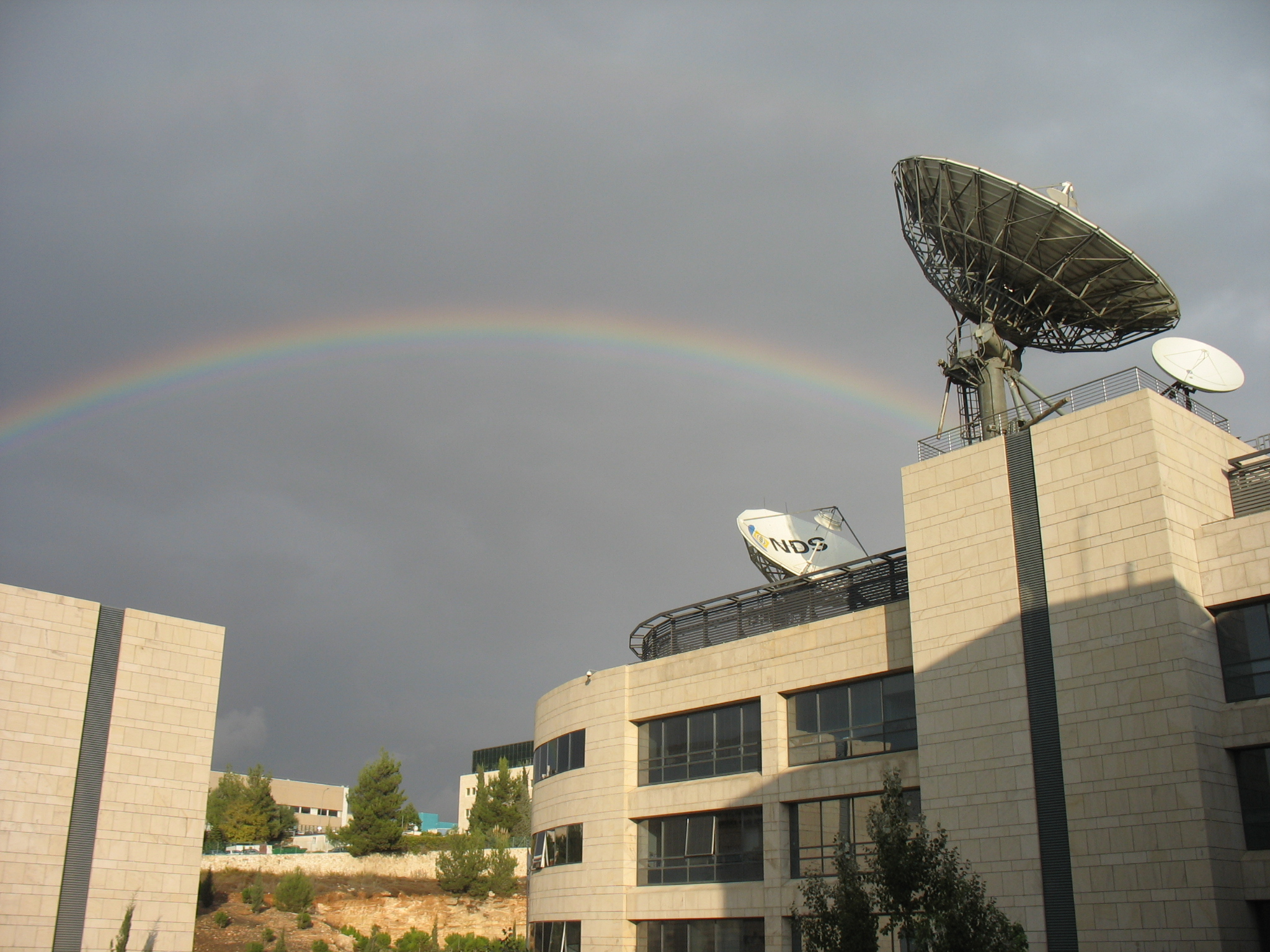
NDS building at Har Hotzvim

- Economy of Israel
- Jerusalem Technology Park in Malha
- Silicon Wadi
