= Talisman (board game) =

Fantasy adventure board game

- The Talisman 2nd edition game cover.
- Designers: Robert Harris
- Publishers: Games Workshop; Fantasy Flight Games
- Publication: 1983; 43 years ago
- Players: 2–6
- Playing time: 240 Minutes
- Chance: Card drawing Dice
- Skills: Role-playing game skills

Talisman: The Magical Quest Game is a fantasy-themed adventure board game for two to six players, originally designed and produced by Games Workshop. The game was first released in 1983 and has gone through three revisions. As of 2024, the fifth edition (2024) is the latest version. The board game sold over 800,000 units by 2000.

From 2008 to 2017 Fantasy Flight Games produced Talisman under license from Games Workshop. Beginning in 2019, Pegasus Spiele took over production of Talisman and all of the game expansions.

As of 2025 a 5th edition of the game is being sold under license from Games Workshop by Avalon Hill.

== History ==
The game was created by Robert Harris for the amusement of himself and his friends. The game's original objective was to become prefect of a boys' school. Changing the theme to fantasy, and naming the game "Talisman", Harris signed a royalty publishing contract with Games Workshop, and the game was shown at Games Day 1983. After releasing the third edition, Games Workshop bought out his remaining interest.

The primary object of the game is to reach the Crown of Command at the centre of the board. The game contains three regions: Outer, Middle, and Inner. Players start in the Outer Region and try to progress to the Inner Region, through the Valley of Fire, and claim the Crown of Command. The game's name, "Talisman", refers to the rule that only characters possessing a Talisman card may enter the Valley of Fire.

=== First and second editions ===
Gameplay begins by selecting a character, or "hero", at the beginning of the game. All characters have the attributes of Life, Strength, and Craft; all characters start with four lives and one bag of gold, but different characters start with different levels of Strength and Craft and have different special gameplay abilities. Players then take turns rolling a die, moving their characters, and following the board's instructions for the locations where they land. Locations may activate events, initiate encounters, or provide "Adventure" cards. Adventure cards may be events, encounters, places, or treasure, and the cards sometimes remain on the board for other players to land on. Through gameplay, players search for a Talisman while increasing their character's attributes to become strong enough to venture inward to the Crown of Command. Once at the Crown, a character can cast the Command Spell, causing opponents to lose one life each time it is successfully cast. The game is over when all opposing players have lost all their lives.

The second edition of Talisman made only cosmetic changes to the first edition. The 1st edition cards, featuring black and white art by Gary Chalk, were colourized, and the game board was changed from a single folded unit to four interlocking pieces. The box art also used a painting by Chris Achilleos instead of a pen-and-ink drawing.

==== Expansions ====
Games Workshop released several expansions for the game. Each expansion added new locations, characters and Adventure cards to the game, while some added new spells and objects. Some even allowed characters the opportunity to bypass the Valley of Fire and be transported directly to the Inner Region or the Crown of Command.

The first, Talisman Expansion Set, was released in 1986, followed by Talisman The Adventure which gave rules clarifications, alternative endings, character sheets, and additional slotted bases for up to 12 players.

The third expansion set, Talisman Dungeon, was released in 1987 and added a second "Dungeon" board to be placed alongside the main Talisman game board. The dungeon is laid out in a spiral pattern, leading to the Treasure Chamber in the centre. Some spells and character abilities are nullified or altered within the dungeon. Players encounter dungeon entrances on the main Talisman board, and, having entered the dungeon, navigate its traps and creatures to reach the fabulous treasure at its centre. On their next turn after reaching the Treasure Chamber, players are transported back to a location on the main board determined by a die roll. Dungeon can be played without the main game board by starting at the entrance to the dungeon and racing to the centre, with the first to arrive declared the winner.

Talisman Timescape, loosely based on the Warhammer 40,000 science fiction setting, was released in 1988. The Timescape added a new board, representing a linked chain of different dimensions, as well as new heroes and objects with a science-fiction theme. Characters may enter the Timescape by encountering a Warp Gate, stumbling upon the Horrible Black Void, or visiting special people such as the Enchantress or the Warlock. Characters cannot encounter each other while in the Timescape—they have been teleported to an entirely different reality. To move, players roll a die and consult a table to see where they are drawn to next.

The next expansion, Talisman City, was released in 1989, and replaces the single "city" space (in the Outer Region on the Talisman board) with an entire "city" board. Within the new city region there are more places to visit and additional items to purchase. Characters can have arrest warrant served on them in the city, either for having no gold or for fighting. If a character with a warrant encounters the City Patrol or Watch, they will be arrested and taken prisoner.

The final expansion, Talisman Dragons, was released in 1993 and added dragon-related cards and heroes.

=== Reception ===
Andy Blakeman reviewed Talisman for Imagine magazine, and stated that "Obviously, this is a luck game, and the amount of luck required is sometimes very frustrating. However, quite an epic fantasy atmosphere builds up around the game, and it plays efficiently and cleanly. If you like fantasy boardgames, then this is quite a good example."

In the April 1984 edition of White Dwarf (Issue 52), Alan Paull liked the high quality of the game components, but thought that games went on for far too long, and winning seemed to be a matter of luck. Paull gave the game a below-average rating of 6 out of 10, concluding, "Talisman is not a bad game. If it was shorter, it would make an enjoyable family game."

In the March–April 1985 edition of The Space Gamer (Issue No. 73), Matthew Costello commented that "This is an ideal fantasy game for your non-gaming friends or relatives. There's enough familiar 'boardgame' here so that they'll be comfortable, but Talisman adds subtle and challenging elements from the FRP world."

Larry DiTillio reviewed Talisman for Different Worlds magazine and stated that "Ease of play, lots of replayability, great fun win or lose, these are the hallmarks of a good beer & pretzels game and Talisman scores high in all three. If this were not enough, Games Workshop has recently put out an expansion set that provides 14 new characters, along with some new Spells and Adventure Cards, that add even more fun to the game. Need I say more?"

In the December 1993 edition of Dragon (Issue 200), Allen Varney considered Talisman a classic, calling it "a nutty romp that calls for lots of luck, a laid-back attitude, and tolerance for getting turned into a toad. You won’t believe how often this game toadifies you."

Talisman was chosen for inclusion in the 2007 book Hobby Games: The 100 Best. Shane Lacy Hensley commented that the very name of Talisman "conjures a smile – if not a nerdish giggle – from most thirty-something gamers as they recall countless high school and college days playing this simple and addictive game."

=== Reviews ===
- Casus Belli #34 (Aug 1986)
- Asimov's Science Fiction v9 n5 (1985 05)
- Isaac Asimov's Science Fiction Magazine
- Jeux & Stratégie #41

=== Third Edition ===
The third edition made numerous changes to the artistic design and mechanics of the game.

Games Workshop released the third edition for Talisman in the Spring of 1994. The third edition contained a new board which included many of the same locations as the first and second editions, but had a new art treatment. The Inner Region became The Wizard's Tower. In the Tower, the heroes encounter a couple of traps and tests, through a set of Tower cards, before combat with the Dragon King, who must be defeated to win the game.

The first and second editions used cards to represent the characters in the game. The cards were placed on plastic bases (called "slotta bases") and moved about the board as the game was played (paintable metal miniature figures for the characters could be purchased separately). The Third Edition did away with the stand-up character cards and instead included plastic miniatures. It removed many characters from the Second Edition and added new ones which tied the world of Talisman more closely to the Warhammer Fantasy settings games.

The Third edition also added an additional character attribute, Experience, not unlike a role-playing game to help the character develop their powers. By defeating enemies (hostile monsters, but not other player characters), the characters accrue experience points. The experience they gain is equal to the defeated enemies' craft or strength. These experience points can then be redeemed for gold, strength, craft or life at the cost of seven experience points for one. The earlier editions used a similar, but more limited feature which applied to strength.

==== Expansions ====
Three expansions were released and some extra characters were printed through White Dwarf magazine. Each of the expansions used "realm dice" (a die marked from 1–4) which made movement slower in the realms. The realms were normally accessible from only one square on the main board.

The first expansion, City of Adventure, was released in 1994 added two boards: the City board (based on, but more compact than, the 2nd Edition Talisman City expansion) and a Forest realm.

Dungeon of Doom was released later in 1994 and added 2 additional game boards: a "Dungeon realm" and a "Mountain realm" which fit around the 2 corners of the original board not used by the City of Adventure expansion. It was based loosely on the expansion Talisman Dungeon for the Second Edition. At the end of the Mountain realm and Dungeon realms there were valuable treasures; reaching and defeating the Eagle King of the Mountain realm entitled the player to move to any square on the board, including the causeway that connected the Wizard's Tower to the middle board.

The 1995 expansion pack, Dragon's Tower added a playing board, a card tower surmounted by a dragon model, extra rules, a realm die and four additional characters. Two extra characters were printed in White Dwarf to coincide with its release. The Dragon's Tower replaced the normal endgame of entering the centre square. Movement through the tower is slower (a die marked only 1-4 is used) and used its own deck of adventure cards.

==== Reception ====
Chris McDonough reviewed Talisman Boxed Game in White Wolf #49 (Nov., 1994), rating it a 4 out of 5 and stated that "Despite Talisman's [high] price tag, however, this really is one of the most fun games I have played. So, if money is no object, run out and buy it. if not, [the price] is a lot of dough to pay for the contents of this box. The only significant additions to the old [...] set are the plastic miniatures. That's a lot to pay for figures."

==== Reviews ====
- Rollespilsmagasinet Fønix (Danish) (Issue 4 - September/October 1994)

=== Fourth Edition ===
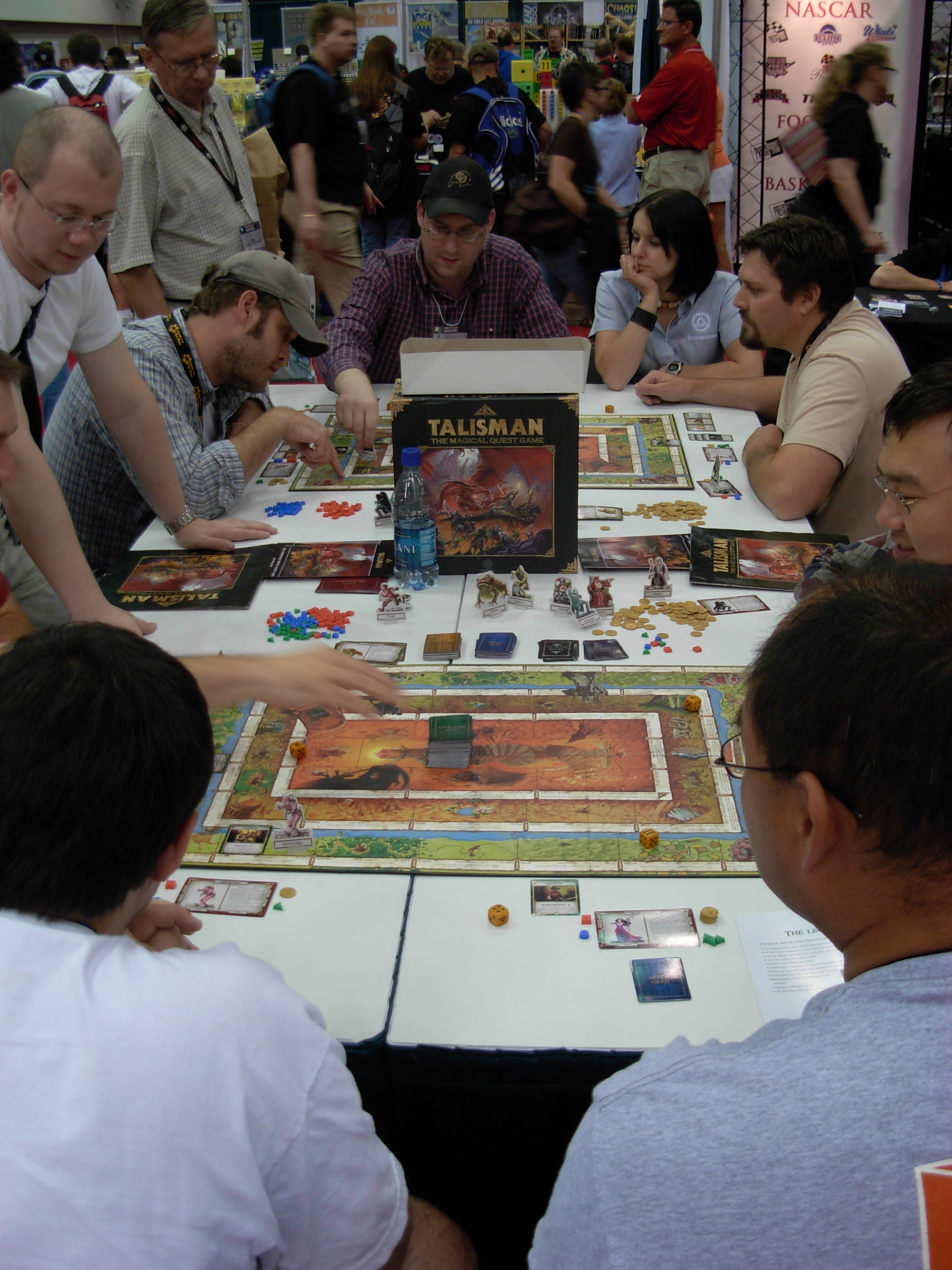
The fourth edition of Talisman was demoed and sold at Gen Con Indy 2007.

On January 8, 2007, Black Industries (an imprint of Games Workshop's publishing division, BL Publishing) announced the launch of a new edition of Talisman, which was released on the confirmed release date of October 5, 2007. This new edition is based around the second edition, incorporating some rule revisions from the Third, as well as a larger six-piece board. The game board is about 30% larger than the second edition board and has an art treatment in-line with contemporary fantasy role-playing games from Games Workshop. The game comes with 14 playable characters: Priest, Monk, Prophetess, Minstrel, Elf, Wizard, Sorceress, Assassin, Ghoul, Warrior, Thief, Druid, Dwarf, and Troll.

At the GAMA Trade Show, it was announced that there would be expansions, but no details were provided at that time.

A few copies of the fourth edition were sold at the Games Day 2007 on September 23, 2007. Numerous images of the pre-production version of the game were posted on Board Game Geek before its general release on October 5, 2007.

==== Reviews ====
- Rebel Times #2

=== Revised Fourth Edition ===
On 28 January 2008 Black Industries announced that they would no longer be publishing board games, including Talisman. On 22 February 2008, Fantasy Flight Games announced that they would be taking over the license for Talisman, continuing to produce the 4th edition and its expansions. Fantasy Flight Games published the Talisman Revised 4th Edition on 17 December 2008, as well as an upgrade pack with updated cards and miniatures for people who bought the original 4th edition.

==== Expansions ====
Through 2016, Fantasy Flight produced numerous expansions to Talisman. Most came with new characters and one or more new endings for the game.

Name	Release date	New characters	Alternative endings	New cards	Other
The Reaper	December 2008	Sage, Dark Cultist, Merchant, and Knight	none	90 Adventure cards, 26 new Spell cards, 12 Warlock Quest cards	Two optional game mechanics: additional Warlock quests and the Grim Reaper, a non-player character that can kill characters outright.
The Dungeon	May 2009	Gladiator, Amazon, Swashbuckler, Gypsy, and Philosopher	none	A new deck of 128 cards called Dungeon cards. 10 Adventure Cards, 20 Spell Cards, 10 Treasure Cards	Includes a new region, an L-shaped piece connected to one corner of the board.
The Frostmarch	October 2009	Leprechaun, Necromancer, Ogre Chieftain, and Warlock	Crown and Sceptre, Ice Queen and Warlock Quests	84 Adventure cards, 20 Spell cards, 24 Warlock Quest cards	none
The Highland	May 2010	Alchemist, Valkyrie, Highlander, Vampiress, Rogue, and Sprite	Battle Royale, The Eagle King, and Hand of Doom	142 Highland cards, 10 Spell cards, 12 Adventure cards, 4 Relic cards	Includes a new region, an L-shaped corner board for heroes to explore.
The Sacred Pool	October 2010	Magus, Cleric, Chivalric Knight, and Dread Knight	Demon Lord, Judgement Day and Sacred Pool	72 new Adventure cards, 16 new Spell cards, 24 Quest Reward cards, 12 Stables cards, 4 Neutral Alignment cards	none
The Dragon	September 2011	Dragon Hunter, Dragon Priestess, Dragon Rider, Minotaur, Fire Wizard, and Conjurer	Wrath of the Dragon King, Challenge for the Crown, Dragon Spawn	168 Dragon cards, 3 Draconic Lord cards	A two-sided Inner Region board (one side featuring the original Inner Region but with new tactics, the other side featuring the Dragon Tower).
The Blood Moon	May 2012	Grave Robber, Vampire Hunter, and Doomsayer	Blood Moon Werewolf, Horrible Black Void, Lightbearers	111 new Adventure cards, 10 new Spell cards, 1 Time card, 6 Lycanthrope cards	Adds a Werewolf, a non-player character that can turn players into Lycanthropes, and a Day and Night mechanic.
The City	January 2013	Spy, Tinkerer, Cat Burglar, Tavern Maid, Bounty Hunter, and Elementalist	3 new Alternative Endings	A new deck of City-themed cards, 18 Wanted Poster cards, various new purchase cards (for the Armoury, Menagerie, Magic Emporium, Apothecary and Stables)	A third L-shaped region board is added. Occupying the corner next to the city.
The Nether Realm	February 2014, print on demand	A new Nether deck of advanced Adventure cards to be used with the alternative endings	3 alternative endings	36 Nether cards	The first print on demand expansion for Talisman.
The Firelands	February 2014	Dervish, Nomad, Jin Blooded and Warlord	3 new Alternative Ending	81 new Adventure cards, 19 new Spell cards, 19 Terrain cards	A set of Fireland tokens that are added to the game, a new "burn" mechanic and new Terrain cards that terraform game board spaces.
The Woodland	September 2014	Totem Warrior, Scout, Spider Queen, Leywalker, and Ancient Oak	3 alternative endings	103 Woodland cards, 10 Adventure cards, 20 Path cards, 14 Destiny cards, 5 Spell cards	A fourth L-shaped region is added, in which characters must use the new Path cards and, if they fulfil its requirements, may gain a Destiny card. It also expands on the concept of Fate, separating the existing Fate tokens into light and dark sides, changing how Fate works.
The Deep Realm	Mid January 2015, print on demand	none	none	2 realm cards, 20 Tunnel Cards and 20 Bridge Cards	Requires the Dungeon and City expansions, and allows for travel between the two realms. The two realm cards serve as bridgeways between the two boards
The Harbinger	June 2015	Celestial, Possessed, and Ascendant Divine	2 new Alternative Endings	75 Harbinger cards, 10 Spell cards, 10 Terrain cards, 32 Omen cards	Focuses on the new titular and non-playable character of the Harbinger, and the seven Omens that can bring about the end of the world.
The Cataclysm	2016	Black Knight, Scavenger, Mutant, Arcane Scion, and Barbarian	4 Alternative Endings	47 Adventure cards, 10 Spell cards, 6 Warlock cards, 6 Talisman cards, 24 Purchase cards, 10 Terrain, 40 Denizen cards, 24 Remnant cards	A new main board that replaces the original main board.

=== Fifth Edition ===
In February 2024, it was announced that a 5th edition of the game would be released on August 1, with preorders beginning May 21, 2024. On May 23, 2024, Nomad Games' website stated that a Talisman Digital Edition 5th edition for Steam was in the works and players could wishlist it on their Steam accounts.

The Fifth Edition of the game is produced by Avalon Hill under license from Games Workshop.

=== Video game versions ===
A version of the game for the ZX Spectrum, Talisman, was released in 1985.

In 2007, Capcom announced plans to release a version of Talisman for the PlayStation Network, Xbox Live Arcade, and Microsoft Windows platforms. This product was originally to coincide with the release of the Fourth Edition of the board game (Q4 2007), but on October 12, 2008, Capcom's Senior Director of Strategic Planning announced the cessation of development, due to a "misfire" and the costs of transferring the project to new developers. He stated that the rights to Talisman had reverted to Games Workshop. This digital version would have supported up to four players, either online or offline. Including 25 different characters from the game and its expansions, it also promised additional downloadable content, such as extra characters and alternative ending conditions.

On November 15, 2012, Nomad Games Ltd released Talisman: Prologue, a single-player video game version of Talisman.

On February 12, 2014, a multiplayer version of the game called Talisman: Digital Edition was released on Steam by Nomad Games and later ported to the PlayStation 4 and Nintendo Switch, along with Android and iOS mobile devices.

Nomad Games released Talisman: Origins on May 16, 2019 for the PC, Mac, iOS, and Android.

== Legacy ==
There are several active communities for the game on the Internet and many individuals have produced their own versions of the game, featuring custom expansions complete with custom Adventure cards, characters and objects.

Random Games attempted to convert Talisman into a Microsoft Windows video game. However, they lost support from their publisher and could not find another before they went out of business.

An unofficial Talisman video game was released in July 2008 but has since been taken down after Games Workshop asserted its intellectual property rights.

In 2012, Fantasy Flight Games announced Relic, a board game using the Talisman rules system and set in Games Workshop's Warhammer 40,000 universe, available in early 2013.

Talisman: Batman was released in 2019, allowing players to play as several members of Batman's rogues gallery attempting to escape from Arkham Asylum.

== International editions ==
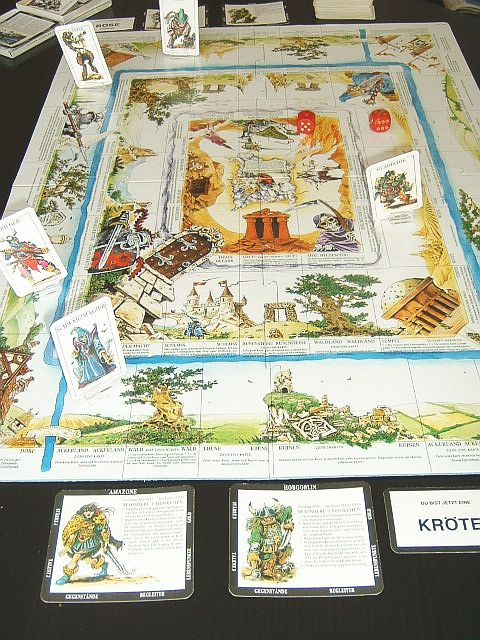
German 2nd Edition

Talisman was translated into several languages: Finnish (2nd Edition), French (1st, 2nd, 3rd and 4th revised Edition), German (2nd, 3rd and 4th revised Edition), Italian (2nd and 4th revised Edition), Czech (2nd Edition and 4th revised Edition), Slovak (2nd Edition), Hebrew (1st, 2nd and 4th Edition), Swedish (1st and 2nd Edition), Polish (2nd and 4th Edition), and Hungarian (4th Edition). All save the Polish versions were only translations of the original game.

=== Hebrew Edition ===
The Hebrew edition was published by Meytzuv in Israel. It was published in both 1st and 2nd edition.

Years after Meytzuv went bankrupt, the game was republished by Lemada and is still played by many fans in Israel. During the Champions' Hall 2nd convention – ChampsCon 2006.

In 2015, Monkey Time, the distributor of Fantasy Flight Games in Israel, translated the 4th revised edition of the game and will publish it instead of the 2nd edition still in the stores in Israel.

=== Polish Edition ===
The Polish edition, published in 1989 by BPiRF Sfera (Biuro Promocji i Reklamy Fantastyki Sfera) company as Magia i Miecz (Magic and Sword) was based on 1st edition rules, and was the only edition with new artwork for all cards. All 2nd Edition expansions were translated, although some were bundled together (Talisman Expansion cards came together with the main set, and The Adventure cards with Dungeon). Furthermore, the Polish edition had one additional expansion, Jaskinia (The Cave), with a new board, cards and heroes. The Cave had some tough monsters and only very advanced heroes could think of going inside.

When Sfera lost the Talisman license from Games Workshop, they published an unauthorized new version of the game: Magiczny Miecz (The Magic Sword). The main board was changed (it had four regions, and "The Beast" (a copy of the Dragon King alternative ending), instead of the Crown of Command), the heroes and cards were different (although many were just copies of the original ones with changed names), and the terminology was changed (event cards instead of adventure cards, sorcery cards instead of spell cards, etc.). The Magic Sword had new graphics (no images from the Polish Talisman were kept, except for the re-edition of Cave, as all expansions were re-released under new names) which was not well received as compared to Talisman. Magic Sword also had one more board, Krypta upiorów (The Crypt of Wraiths), with some innovations. Magic Sword was not well received by Talisman fans, although it appealed to many new players. Later, a second edition of this game, with improved graphics, was released (this time only the main set).

Revised 4th Edition was translated and published in Poland under the name Talisman. Magia i Miecz, owing to popularity of Magia i Miecz in the 1990s.

== Popular culture ==
In several episodes of the television show The Big Bang Theory, some of the main characters can be seen playing Talisman (4th Edition) in Sheldon and Leonard's living room.

== See also ==
- Dungeonquest, a similar board game with a fantasy setting and emerging playfield.
