= Talisman City =

Expansion to Talisman board game

Talisman City is an expansion to the Talisman board game. It was published in 1989 by Games Workshop.

== Description ==
Talisman City provides 72 new Encounter cards, 7 new Adventure cards, 3 new Dungeon cards, 20 new Purchase cards, 10 new Spells, 6 new Characters, and an additional board that represents Talisman City.

The Talisman City expansion replaces the city space in the Outer Region on the original Talisman game board, where there are more places to visit and additional items to purchase.

=== Special rules ===
All characters visiting the city must always own at least one gold; an arrest warrant is issued for a penniless character, and if that character encounters the Patrol or Watch, the character is arrested and thrown into the Dungeon. Combat within the City also results in an arrest warrant.

== New characters ==
Two of the new characters, the Minotaur and the Valkyrie, are regular characters. The four others (Sheriff, Archmage, King's Champion and Master Thief) are "titles" or "offices" that a character can acquire. If the character accepts one of these titles, the player hands in the original character card and receives the new position with all its attributes and abilities.

== Publication history ==
In 1983, Robert Harris designed the fantasy board game Talisman and it was published by Games Workshop (GW) with black & white cards. The game proved popular, and two years later, GW issued a second edition, which only differed in having full colour cards and new box cover art. In 1986, GW released an expansion set with new characters, spells and adventure cards. The expansion set also proved popular, and GW released more expansions: The Adventure (1986), Dungeon (1987), City (1989), and Dragons (1993).

City was designed by Evan Friedman and Paul Morrow.

== Reception ==
In the September–October 1989 edition of Games International (Issue 9), Richard Ashley commented, ""If you enjoy Talisman this is well worth adding as it is fun, although I found the rich [characters] had an easier time." Ashley concluded by giving it an average rating of 3 out of 5.

In the January 1990 issue of Shadis, B.O. Felton thought that this expansion, the fifth for Talisman, "raises the question of how far Games Workshop can take the Talisman system and retain the playability of the original game." Felton felt this game added too much time, noting, "In our sessions, the City expansion seemed to double the normal playing time of an already time-devouring game. The game dragged on and on. Players became disinterested after a few hours and we were relieved when someone finally managed to claim victory." Despite this, Felton noted a positive aspect, commenting, "Our group is renowned for its backstabbing sessions of Talisman and City has only fueled our nefarious gameplay. The presence of the Dungeon and the ability to frame other players has become our bread and butter and most of us have spent our share of time staring at the dungeon walls." Felton concluded that those that already enjoyed Talisman would be the beneficiaries of this game, saying, "If you are an avid Talisman player you will no doubt enjoy this new offering. If, however, you only moderately liked the basic game, you will probably find that the expansion has only heightened the qualities of the game you didn't like. Those drawbacks are mainly the time requirements needed to play and the length of time before your turn comes around."

In the Italian edition of Videogame & Computer World, Massimo De Lisio noted, "The City is not exactly like the Dungeon or Timescape expansions, in the sense that it is not interspersed with the base game, but constantly supports it, increasing the potential for randomness and new events."
