= Talisman Timescape =

Talisman Timescape is a 1988 expansion for the second edition of the fantasy board game Talisman, both produced by Games Workshop (GW).

== Description ==
Talisman Timescape adds a new "Timescape" board to Talisman as well as eight new characters (Astropath, Chainsaw Warrior, Astronaut, Space Pirate, Cyborg, Space Marine, Archaeologist, and Scientist). This is only an expansion set, not a complete game — the Talisman game is also required for play.

=== Contents ===
Timescape contains these items:

- Timescape game board
- 42 Timescape Cards
- 12 Timescape Purchase Cards
- 2 Spell Cards
- 8 Character Cards
- 8 cardboard playing pieces. (These could be replaced by separately purchased 25mm metal miniatures produced by GW's sister company Citadel Miniatures.)
- 4 Timescape Data Sheets
- 1 rulesheet

=== Setup ===
After setting up the main Talisman game board, the Timescape board is set out beside the main gameboard, along with the deck of cards and Purchase cards. The eight new characters are shuffled into the main character deck.

=== Gameplay ===
Players may enter the Timescape board by encountering a Warp Gate, via the Horrible Black Void (from the Talisman The Adventure expansion set), or by visiting special encounters such as the Enchantress or the Warlock.

Once on the Timescape board, characters do not move from square to square as with the regular game, but are randomly teleported (via a die roll) to a new area, always moving in a clockwise direction. Unlike the main game, players cannot encounter each other in the Timescape, even if they are in the same area.

== Publication history ==
Talisman was published by GW in 1983, and became a bestseller. GW published a second edition, and then several expansion sets including Talisman Expansion Set (1986), Talisman The Adventure (1986), Talisman Dungeon (1987), and Talisman Timescape in 1988. Timescape was designed by Canadian Frank Bourque, who loosely based the areas and characters (such as the Astropath and Space Marine) on GW's popular Warhammer 40,000 game.

== Reception ==
In the 2018 book Storytelling in the Modern Board Game: Narrative Trends from the Late 1960s to Today, Marco Arnaudo said of Talisman Timescape and other expansion sets, "Given that the pleasure of playing Talisman was never in strategy and optimization but in trying on heroic identities, discovering things, and defeating enemies, the addition of such expansions greatly increased the entertainment value of the game."

== Other reviews ==
- Casus Belli #44 (April 1988)
- Isaac Asimov's Science Fiction Magazine v12 n10 (October 1988)
