= Ephraim Hertzano =

Romanian-born Israeli board game designer (1912 - 1987)

- אפרים הרצנו
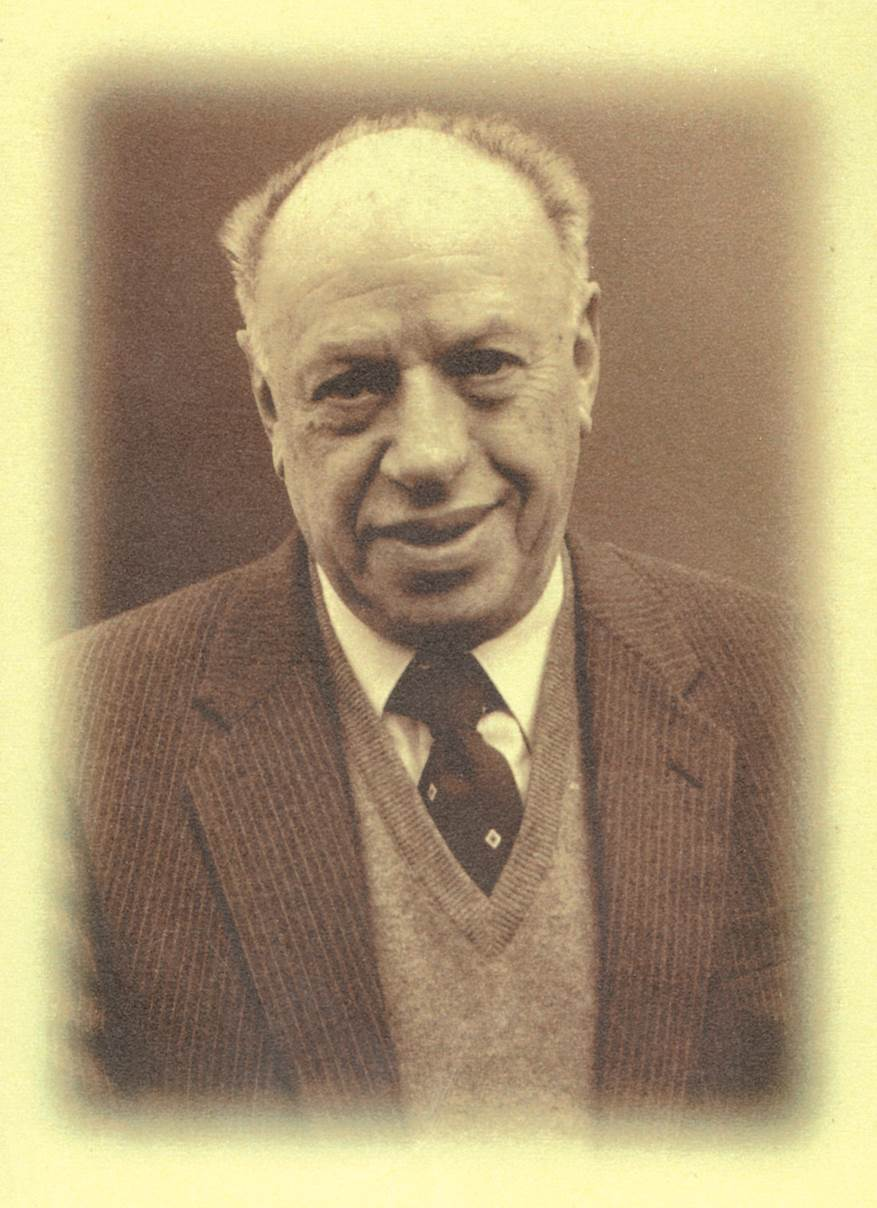
- Born: 1912
- Died: 1987 (aged 74–75)
- Occupation: Board game designer
- Known for: Inventor of Rummikub
- Awards: Spiel des Jahres (1980); Spel van het Jaar (1983)

Ephraim Hertzano (Hebrew: אפרים הרצנו; 1912 – September 1987) was a Romanian-born Israeli board game designer. He is the inventor of the board game Rummikub.

== Biography ==
Ephraim Hertzano was born in Romania, to a Jewish family. He originally sold toothbrushes and cosmetics. He invented the tile game Rummikub in the 1940s when card-playing was outlawed under the Communist regime. In the 1940s, after immigrating to British Mandate of Palestine (now Israel) after World War II, the former perfume seller developed the first sets with his family in the backyard of his home in Bat Yam.

Over the years, the family licensed it to other countries. Rummikub became Israel's best selling export game. In 1977, it became a best-selling game in the United States. The following year Hertzano published an Official Rummikub Book, which describes three different versions of the game: American, Sabra, and International. The game was first made by Lemada Light Industries Ltd, founded by Hertzano in 1978.

Hertzano died in September 1987.

== Awards and recognition ==
- Spiel des Jahres, 1980, for Rummikub
- Spel van het Jaar, 1983, for Rummikub

== See also ==
- Israeli inventions and discoveries
