= Rummikub =

Tile-based game for two to four players

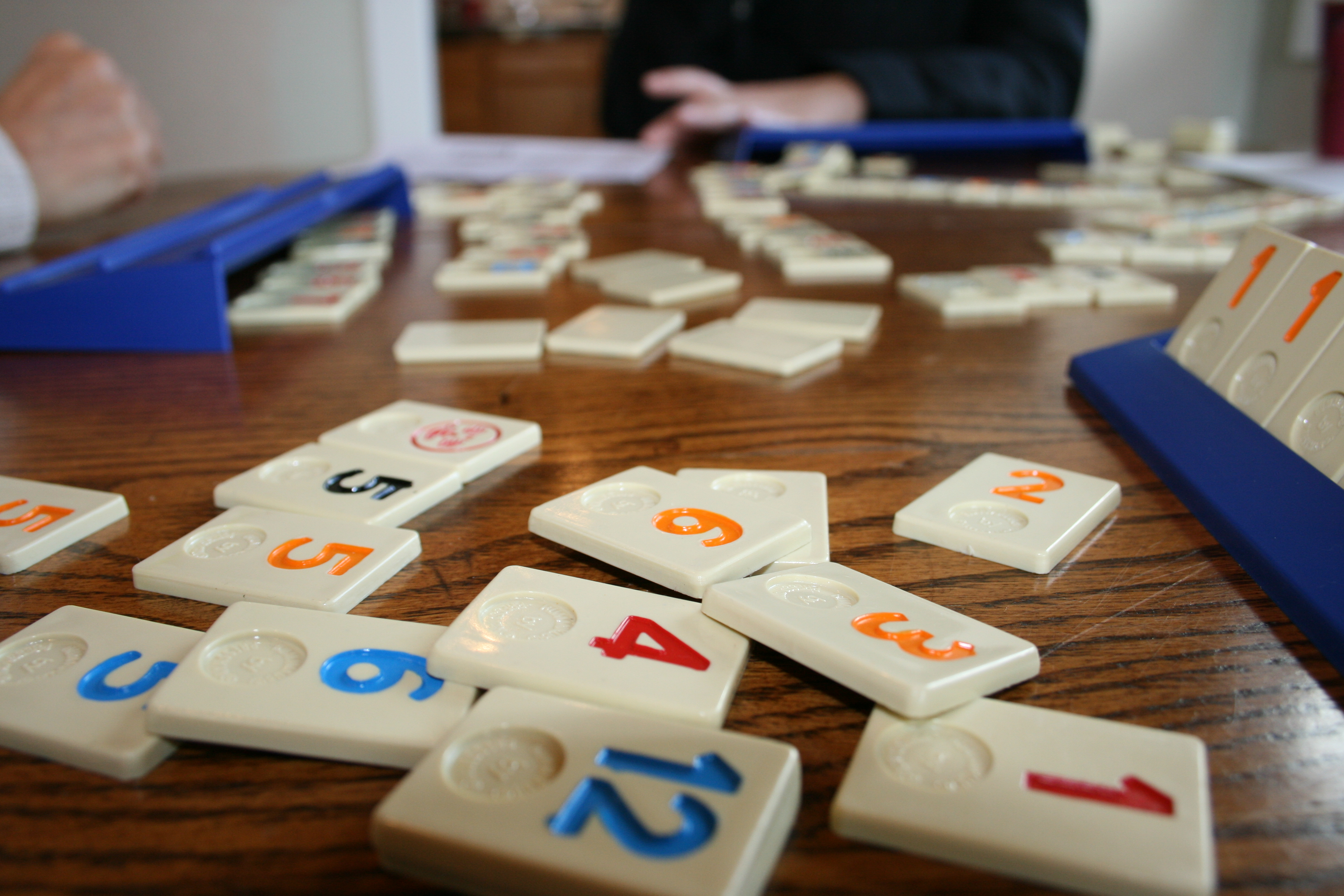
A selection of Rummikub tiles and racks

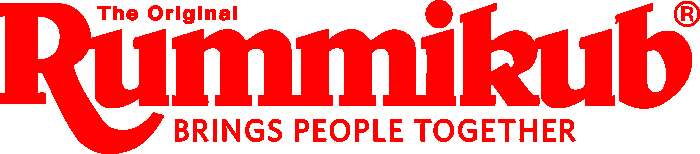
Rummikub logo

Rummikub (/ˈrʌmikjuːb/, "rummy cube") is the proprietary board game that was developed and marketed by Ephraim Hertzano in the 1950s. It is a tile-based game for two to four players, combining elements of the card game rummy and mahjong. There are 106 tiles in the game, including 104 numbered tiles (valued 1 to 13 in four different colors, two copies of each) and two jokers. Players have 14 tiles initially and take turns putting down tiles from their racks into sets (groups or runs) of at least three. Players have a time limit for one or two minutes for their turn, or draw a tile if they cannot play. In the Sabra version (the most common and popular), the first player to use all their tiles scores a positive score based on the total of the other players' hands, while the losers get negative scores. Variations of the game contain four jokers. An important feature of the game is that players can move and reuse the tiles that have already been placed on the table. The game can also be played with two decks of playing cards, with suits being different colors and numbers as follows: Ace = 1, numbers 2–10 = the corresponding number, Jack = 11, Queen = 12, King = 13, and with Jokers.

== History ==
Rummikub was invented by Ephraim Hertzano, a Romanian-born Jew, who emigrated to Israel after World War II. He hand-made the first sets with his family in the backyard of his home. Hertzano sold these sets door-to-door and on a consignment basis at small shops. Over the years, the family licensed it to other countries and it became Israel's best-selling export game. In the 1970s it was brought to the United States by Irv and Arline Kossoff to sell in their New York's Gift, Games, and Luggage store. Arline translated the rules from Hebrew to English and by 1977, it became a bestselling game in the United States. The game was marketed as "Rummikid" during part of the 1970s.

Hertzano's Official Rummikub Book, published in 1978, describes three different versions of the game: American, Sabra, and International. Modern Rummikub sets include only the Sabra version rules, with no mention of the others, and there are variations in the rules between publishers. The game was first made by Lemada Light Industries Ltd, founded by Hertzano in 1978.

Rummikub is similar to several central European card games which are played with two decks of playing cards, including Machiavelli and Vatikan. Vatikan is played with two decks of cards and one joker per player, thus making 106 cards for two players.

In Turkey, a variant of the game is known as Okey and is widely played by families at gatherings or at local cafes.

In 2026, Longshore Limited acquired the worldwide IP rights (including the Rummikub trademark) to the physical tabletop versions of Rummikub, excluding Israel, the U.S., Canada and the online game format.

== Game pieces ==
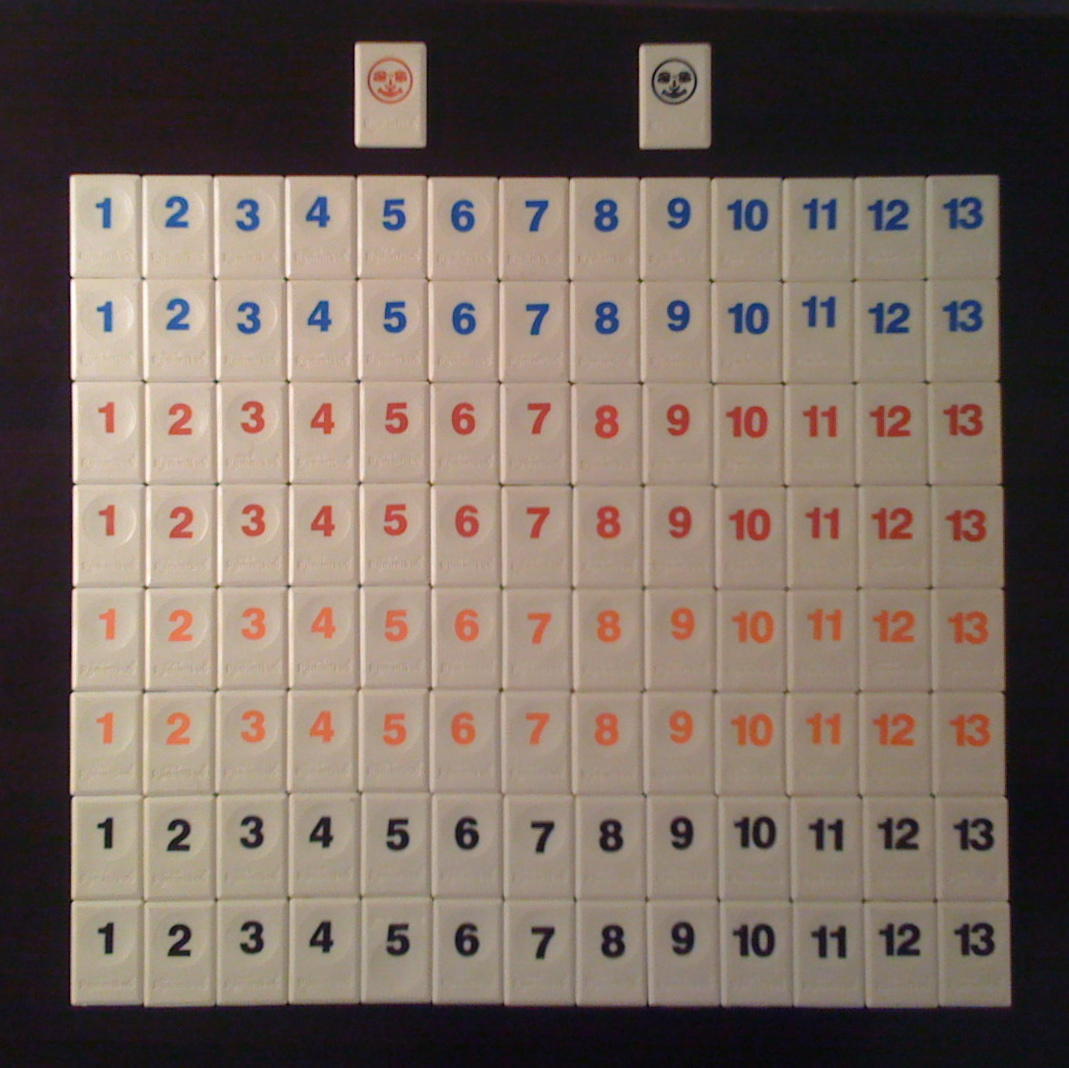
The 106 Rummikub tiles

Rummikub's main component is a pool of tiles, consisting of 104 number tiles and two joker tiles. The number tiles range in value from one to thirteen in four colors (blue, red, orange, and black). Each combination of color and number is represented twice. Players each have a rack to store tiles without revealing the face of the tiles to the other player(s).

== Rules ==
The following explanation is based on the rules in the 1998 Pressman American edition.

=== Setup ===
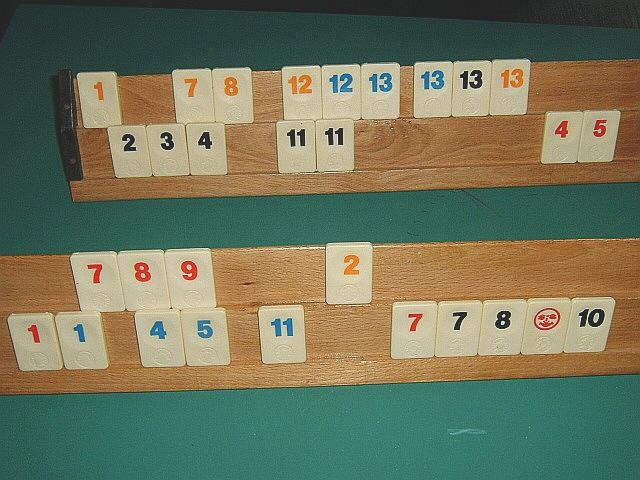
The racks of two players

Tiles are shuffled together and either placed into a bag or spread out face down across the table. Each player draws and reveals one tile. The player whose tile has the highest number value will start the game. The remaining tiles are called the "pool." Tiles are returned to the pool, and players collect 14 random tiles and arrange them on their racks. Play begins with the starting player and proceeds in a clockwise (for modern variants) direction.

=== Play ===
For the first player's move, they must play a set (or sets in some versions) with a value of at least 30 points. Point values are taken from the face value of each tile played, with the joker (if played) assuming the value of the tile it is being used in place of. A player may not use other players' tiles to make the "initial meld". If a player cannot make an initial meld, they must pick up a single tile from the pool and add it to their rack. Play then proceeds to the next player.

Once a player has made their initial meld, they can, on a separate turn, play one or more tiles from their rack, making or adding to groups and/or runs. If the player cannot (or chooses not to) play any tiles, they must pick a tile randomly from the pool and add it to their rack.

Players may not make their initial meld and, along with that, play on groups and runs during the same turn. They can play on runs and groups after the turn of making the initial meld.

Players may play tiles by amending sets already in play. The only limit to the length of a run is the extremes of the tile values. Groups are limited to four because colors may not repeat within a group.

Rummikub sets visualized as radial (runs) or circumferential (groups) rows of at least three regions in a stacked radial plot

==== Sets ====
All tiles in play must be arranged in sets of at least three tiles. The two valid set types are called runs and groups.

A run is composed of three or more, same-colored tiles, in consecutive number order. (A 1 may not follow a 13.)

Example run:	9 10 11 12

A group is made from three or four same-value tiles in distinct colors. For example: red 3, blue 3, black 3 and yellow 3.

Example group:	7 7 7

==== Examples of invalid sets ====
Invalid because numbers are not consecutive:	1 2 4
Invalid because numbers in a run must all be the same color:	1 2 3
Invalid because colors may not repeat in a group:	1 1 1

==== Example of play ====
Tiles already out:	3 4 5
Own tiles:	2 5 5
Recombined result:	2 3 4 and 5 5 5

==== Manipulating existing tiles ====
During a player's turn, sets of tiles that have already been played may be manipulated to allow more tiles to be played. At the end of the turn, all played tiles must be in valid sets.

Shifting a run
Players may add the appropriate tile to either end of a run and remove a tile from the other end for use elsewhere. If red 3, 4, and 5 have already been played, a player may add the red 6 to the end and remove the 3 for use elsewhere.
Splitting a run
Players may split long runs and insert the corresponding tiles in the middle. Thus, if blue 6, 7, 8, 9, and 10 are already a run, the player may insert their own 8 to make two runs: 6, 7, 8 and 8, 9, 10.
Substituting in a group
Players may replace any of the tiles in a three-tile group with a tile of the fourth color and the same value. If blue 6, red 6, and yellow 6 are already a group, the player may add the black 6 and remove any one of the other three for use elsewhere.
Removing tiles
So long as the remaining tiles form a valid run, tiles can be removed from the ends of runs. Any one tile may be removed from a four-tile group.
Joker substitution
A joker may not be retrieved before the initial meld. A joker can be retrieved from a set by replacing it with a tile of the same numerical value and colour it represents. The tile used to replace the joker can come from the player's rack or from the table. In the case of a group of 3, the joker can be replaced by the tile of either of the missing colours. A joker that has been replaced must be used in the player's same turn as part of a new set. A set containing a joker can have tiles added to it, be split apart or have tiles removed from it. The joker can be moved or replaced in any possible way as long as you maintain a set of at least three tiles.
Harvested tiles
In the course of a turn, a tile that is "harvested" from an existing set must be played during the turn; it cannot be kept for later use. Example: if there is a 3, 4, 5 run on the table, the 3 can be harvested by putting down the appropriately colored 6, but the 3 must be used during that turn, not kept in the player's hand for later use.

=== Scoring ===
Once a winner has been declared, the losing players must add up the values of the tiles remaining in their racks, with jokers worth 30 points (their score for the game). The joker has a penalty value of 30. A player's score for the game is subtracted from their current cumulative score. Once calculated, each of the losing players' scores for the game is added to the winners current cumulative score.

For example: suppose in a game player A wins, player B has a score of 5, player C has a score of 10 and player D a score of 3. Player A will now have a cumulative score of 18, player B will be −5, player C will be −10 and player D will be −3.

Should the game result in no winner, the player with the lowest number of tiles in their rack is the winner. Scoring is then carried out in the normal manner.

If one person never had the required points to make a meld and the game is over, their points are added to the score of each of the other players. The person with the highest number of points is the winner.

=== Winning ===
Game play continues until a player has used all of the tiles in the rack, at which point they should call out "Rummikub," and are declared the winner. If the pool runs out of tiles, play continues until there is a winner or no player can make a valid play.

=== Rule variations ===
Draw Two / River

- Draw two - when you cannot or do not want to add a tile, you can draw from the Pool. To draw, pick up two (2) tiles, discard one (1) to the River, and place the other on your Rack, ending your turn. (The River is a row of tiles discarded during a draw. They must be kept in order of discard.)
- Pull from River - when you want a particular Tile from the River, you must pick up all the Tiles preceding it. Tiles are added to the River from left to right. So, the oldest Tile is to the far left, and the newest is to the far right. The oldest Tile that you pick up in the River is the Key Tile and must be played during that turn. The remaining tiles pulled from the River are called the Plunder. All of the Plunder Tiles must be placed on your Rack and cannot be used this turn. Once you play the Key Tile your turn is over. You can use any tiles already on your rack in order to use the Key Tile.

"French" Rules

- Runs (1,2,3) are played horizontally, like the original rules, but Groups (2,2,2) are played vertically both on their own and also using the existing tiles that have been played (like Scrabble), allowing for a faster and more strategic game.
- Like the original, the initial meld must be separate from the tiles already out but can be played with a Run and Group together from your own tiles.

==== Example of play using French Rules ====
Tiles already out:	3 4 5
Own tiles:	2 4 4
Recombined result: 2 3 4 5 4; 4

== Reception ==
Games magazine included the game as Rummy-O II in their "Top 100 Games of 1980", noting the appeal of playing with tiles rather than cards for "the sound of snapping them onto the table when making a strong play". Rummikub has sold more than 50 million units.

=== Awards ===
- 1977 USA: Best Selling Game award
- 1980 Germany: Game of the year award (Spiel des Jahres)
- 1983 Holland: Game of the Year award
- 1990 Spain: Game of the Year award
- 1993 Poland: Best game of the Year award (Gra Roku)
- 1997 France: Rummikub Word won France's As d'Or award at the Cannes International Games Festival
- 2000 Israel: Game of the Decade award
- 2003 USA: 100 Years of Power Play
- 2005 Korea: Best Game Award
- 2009 USA: Parents Choice award
- 2016 UK: Rummikub Twist, won highly commended in the games and puzzle category for the young ones - Rainbow Toy Awards UK
- 2016 UK: #2 in Family Strategy Games
- 2016 UK: #3 Rummikub Junior was awarded ‘bronze’ in the Best Game category at the Right Start Awards
- 2018 UK: #1 in Family Strategy Games
- 2019 UK: #1 Family Classic Award. Imagination Gaming Family and Education Game Awards
- 2020 Poland: Rummikub received the "Child friendly World“ award
- 2022 UK: #1 IG Family Classic Award

== World Championship ==
Following Herzano's death, his children launched the Remmikub World Championship, holding the first one in Jerusalem in 1991 with 12 countries. It has been held every three years since. The first champion was Japan's Masato Kuwahara.

The 1994 championship was held on a cruise ship sailing the Rhine River from Basel to Amsterdam. It was won by Egyptian Nehad Zahran.

By 2024 the tournament had grown to include representatives from 32 countries.

== Reviews ==
- Games #3
- Family Games: The 100 Best

== See also ==
- Israeli inventions and discoveries
