= Machiavelli (Italian card game) =

Italian card game

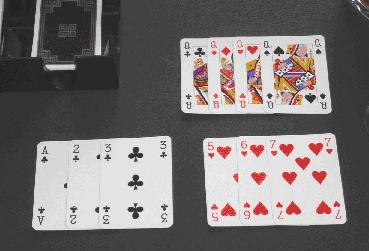
- Three melds
- Origin: Italy
- Named variants: Thirty-Six
- Family: Rummy
- Deck: Two 52-card decks

Machiavelli (also Thirty-Six) is an Italian card game derived from Rummy and is usually played by 2 up to 5 players, but can be played by even a higher number. Because of its characteristics, it is not generally associated with gambling, but is instead a party game.

Its appearance can be traced to World War II.

== Dealing ==
Play requires two decks of 52 standard playing cards, excluding the jokers.

The dealer, chosen randomly, deals either 12 or 15 cards to each player in clockwise direction. If there are more than five players, the dealer may reduce the number of cards dealt to each person, three cards being the minimum. After dealing the remaining deck is placed in the center of the table.

=== Alternative version ===
Two decks of cards without jokers are needed. The dealer, chosen at random, deals 6 cards to each player in clockwise direction. After dealing they put four face up cards in front of where they would put the rest of the cards, in the center of the table. These cards can be placed in hand only if you can form with other cards at least three of same and different numbers. They are helping cards.

== Opening play ==
The player to the left of the dealer goes first. The game continues going clockwise.

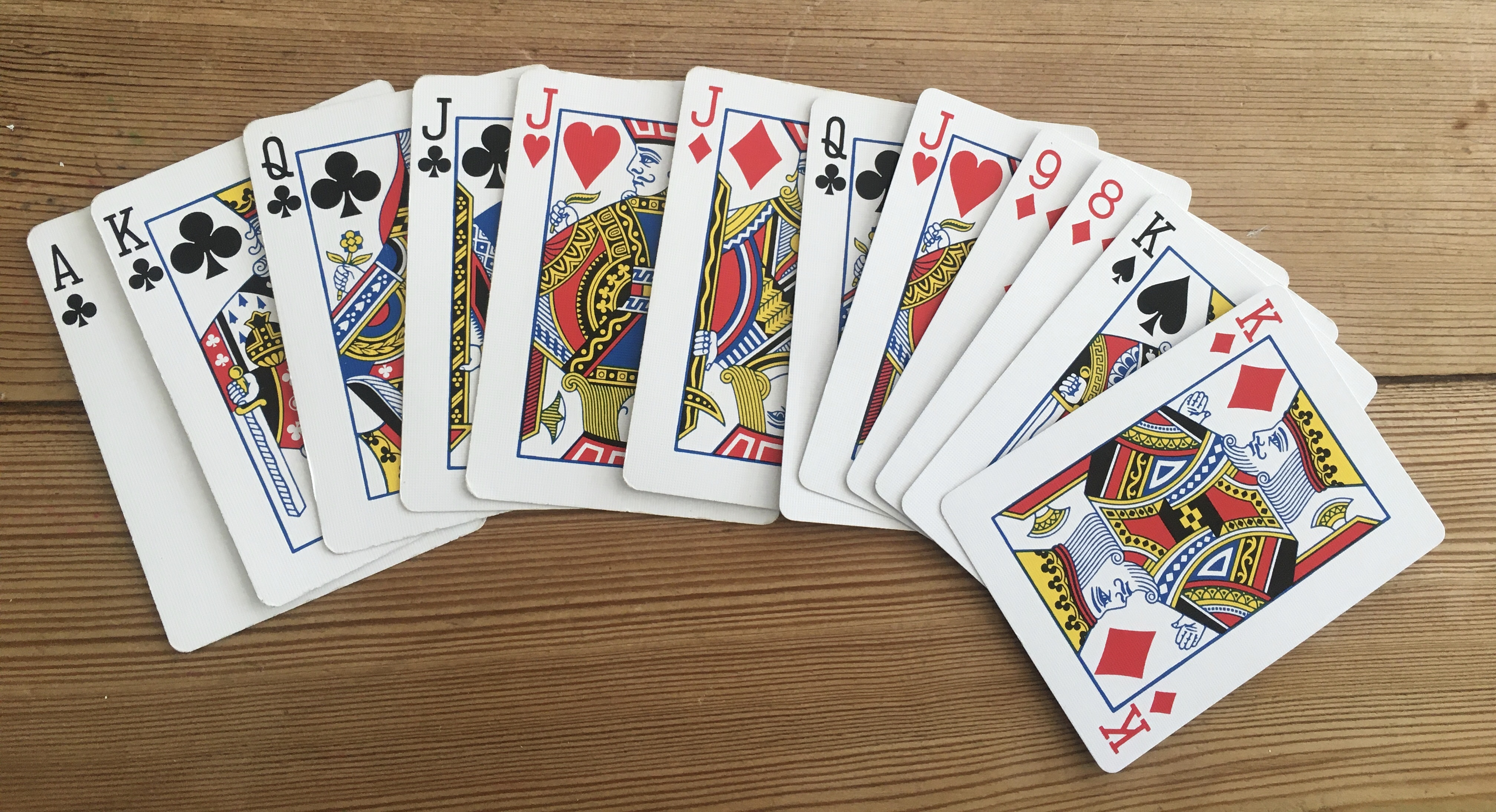
This photo depicts a starting hand for the card game Thirty-Six (with 12 cards). There are three possible combinations playable here, Ace-King-Queen-Jack of Clubs; Jacks of Clubs, Hearts, and Diamonds; and Kings of Clubs, Spades, and Diamonds. There is an incomplete combination of 9-8 of Diamonds. There are two 'duplicate' cards - Queen of Clubs, and Jack of Hearts.

In certain variations, the card in the player's hand must reach 36 points in valid combinations (hence the name Thirty-Six). A player cannot change combinations of cards already on the table, or add to any combinations on the table until they are able to put down these 36 points.

Points are allocated to cards as follows:

- Aces are always worth 1 point, even if they follow a King.
- 2, 3, 4, 5, 6, 7, 8, 9, and 10 are worth their face value.
- Jack, Queen, and King are worth 10 points each.

These point allocations are not relevant later in the game.

== Rules ==
There are three main actions that the player can decide to play:

- Play a valid combination of cards on the table.
- Add one or more cards to an existing combination of cards.
- Draw a card from the deck if you don't play any cards.

In some variations it is compulsory for the player to draw a card at the beginning of their turn.

A valid combination means:

- Three (or four) of the same card, but different suits (example: 7♥ 7♦ 7♠)
- A straight of at least three consecutive cards of the same suit (example: 3♠ 4♠ 5♠)
- Adding one or more cards to a combination on the table (example: adding 2♠ to 3♠ 4♠ 5♠, and/or adding 7♣ to 7♥ 7♦ 7♠)

When finished, the current player passes the game to the player on their left. A player who fails to place any cards on the table must draw the top card from the deck and end their turn.

The player who manages to play all the cards in their hand wins the game.

== Special features ==
The defining feature of Machiavelli is being able to make changes to the combinations of cards already on the table. The current player, if they desire, may reorganise the cards in order to make new combos that make it easier to play one or more cards in their hand. All new combinations must be valid, and players cannot remove any cards already on the table.

=== Example 1 ===
Imagine that there are three triplets on the table: one of Kings (K), one of Queens (Q) and one of Jacks (J) consisting only of hearts, diamonds and clubs.

- K♥ K♦ K♣
- Q♥ Q♦ Q♣
- J♥ J♦ J♣

The current player wants to play their A♣ on the table. They can change the combinations on the table to form three straights: one of hearts, one of diamonds and one of clubs.

- J♥ Q♥ K♥
- J♦ Q♦ K♦
- J♣ Q♣ K♣

Now, the player can add their A♣ the straight made of clubs

- J♥ Q♥ K♥
- J♦ Q♦ K♦
- J♣ Q♣ K♣ A♣

This play is correct because all the new combinations created are valid.

=== Example 2 ===
Imagine that the following combos are on the table

- 10♥ 10♦ 10♠
- J♥ J♦ J♠
- Q♥ Q♦ Q♣

The current player wants to play their 9♠. They attempt to modify the groups by creating a straight of Hearts, one of Diamonds and one of Spades.

- 10♥ J♥ Q♥
- 10♦ J♦ Q♦
- 9♠ 10♠ J♠
- Q♣

This play is not valid as it leaves a Q♣ that can not be combined with any other combination on the table. They must restore the combinations to the way they were.

The player, however, can use the last card to create a new combination with the cards in their hand. If they have a Q♦ and Q♠ in their hand, they may play both Queens to create a new triple. The result would be:

- 10♥ J♥ Q♥
- 10♦ J♦ Q♦
- 9♠ 10♠ J♠
- Q♣ Q♦ Q♠

This final result is valid.

If a player rearranges the cards on the table, then realizes their intended play will leave invalid combinations, they must return all cards to the groups they were in before they began their turn. If they are unable to do so, they must draw three cards. The other players will then try to restore the cards to their proper groups. Any invalid cards left on the table will be later incorporated into valid groups by other players.

== See also ==
- Rummikub
