= Talisman (video game) =

1985 video game

- Developer: SLUG
- Publisher: Games Workshop
- Platform: ZX Spectrum
- Release: 1985
- Genres: Digital board game, role-playing game

Talisman (also called The Talisman) was released in 1985 for ZX Spectrum, developed by SLUG and published by Games Workshop. The game is a conversion of the Second Edition of the board game. It is a fantasy hybrid board/role-playing game, in which players moved across a text-based virtual board, fighting creatures, collecting items, and strengthening their characters through experience. The ultimate goal was to defeat the other players, typically by reaching the Crown of Command on the game board.

== Reception ==
Gameplay screenshot

Trevor Mendham reviewed Talisman for White Dwarf #66, giving it an overall rating of 7 out of 10, and stated that "Overall, the presentation of Talisman is excellent and the graphics make it a pleasure to play. It will certainly appeal to Talisman fans lacking opponents, as the computer makes a very reasonable job of this." Richard Price of Sinclair User gave the game four out of five stars and said: "Even with four players it is unlikely that anyone will be bored as the action can be quite entertaining, even to watch. This gives The Talisman an edge over text-based multiple player games." Paul Coppins of Computer and Video Games gave it one out of ten and said: "[...] for me this Adventure is summed up in one word — poor!" Derek Brewster of Crash gave the game seven out of ten and said: "Talisman is a very complex strategy game with superb graphics and all the other trappings of a well designed and highly polished piece of software. Where the game really excels is in its offering entertainment for up to four players which is sufficiently complex to keep all interested for the duration. As with all involved strategy games it will take a while to get into it, but I think the time would be well spent as this game has a lot going for it."
