= Okey =

Board game

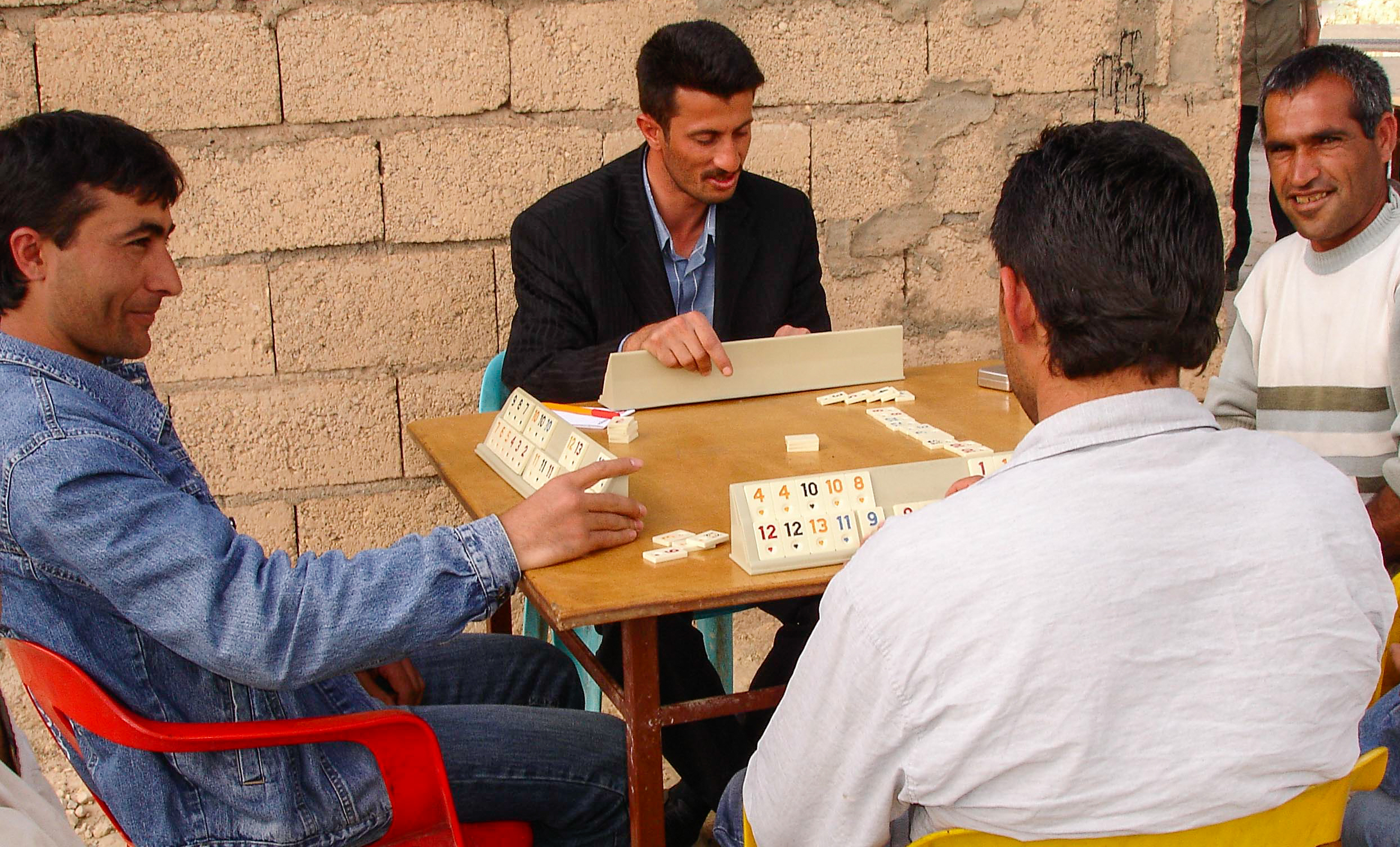
A game of Okey in the Mardin Province of Turkey

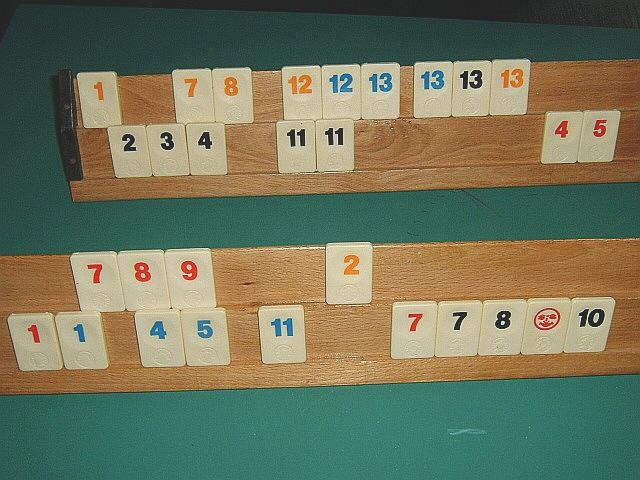
Racks and tiles used commonly in Okey and Rummikub

Okey (Turkish pronunciation: [ˈocej]) is a tile-based game, popular in Turkey, of the rummy family. The aim of the game is to score points against the opposing players by collecting certain groups of tiles. It is usually played with four players, but can also be played with only two or three players.

== Setting up the game ==
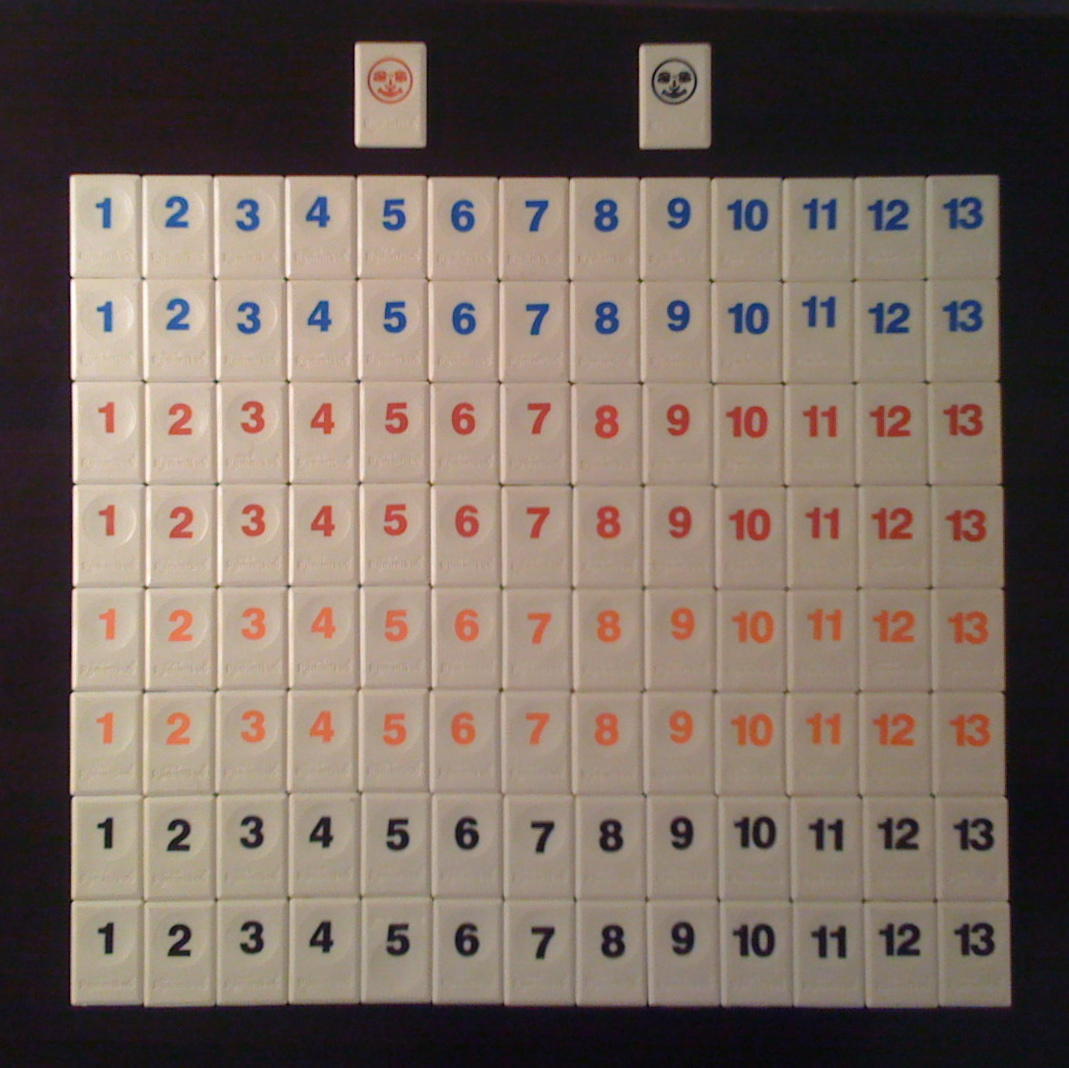
Every game has 104 numbered tiles and 2 false joker tiles

The 106 tiles are placed face down on the table and thoroughly mixed. Next, the players stack the tiles face down in groups of 5, creating a total of 21 stacks. There is no specific rule about how many stacks should be in front of each player. It is convenient to have at least six in front of the dealer, but this makes no real difference to the game.

One tile remains unstacked and is kept by the dealer briefly. The dealer is randomly chosen at the start and passes to the right after every round.

The dealer then throws a die to determine on which stack the one remaining tile will be placed upon. For example if a 6 is thrown, the tile is placed on the sixth stack in front of the dealer (counting from left). If the number thrown is greater than the number of stacks in front of the dealer, then the count will continue using the stacks in front of the player to dealer's right, and one of these will be selected. The selected stack now has six tiles.

Next, the dealer throws the die for a second time to determine which tile will be shown face-up. The second throw selects one of the tiles in the selected stack, counting upwards from the bottom of the stack. The selected tile is extracted from the stack and placed face-up on top of it. If the selected tile is a false joker, it is returned to the selected stack and the second throw of the die is repeated until a numbered tile is selected.

This face-up tile helps determine the "joker" (okey) and "false joker" (sahte okey) for the game. The color and value of the joker and the false joker changes every round.

=== Determination of joker ===
The face-up tile on top of the stack helps determine the joker. The joker has the same color as this face-up tile. And its number for is +1 of this tile. For example, if the face up-tile is the red 10, the red 11s become jokers. If the face up tile is a 13, the 1s of the same colour become jokers.

The joker is a very useful tile, because it functions as a wild tile that can be used to represent other tiles to complete a combination. Players with the joker tile are free to assign for themselves which color and number the joker tile will represent.

=== Determination of false joker ===
The face-up tile on top of the stack also helps determine the false joker. The false jokers are not wild - they are used only to represent the tiles that have become jokers. So for example, if the red 11s became the jokers, then the false jokers are played as red 11s (and cannot represent any other tile).

New players may wonder why false joker tiles aren't used as joker themself. A possible reason can be that through any defect in the tiles, some players learn to recognise the false jokers from the back, that would give them an unfair advantage. If a different tile is used as the joker in each game, recognising a joker from the back becomes much more difficult.

=== Distribution of the tiles ===
After determining the joker and the false joker, the stacks of tiles are distributed among the players. The player to dealer's right will receive 15 tiles and the others 14 each. The player to the right of the dealer takes the next stack after (to the right of) the selected stack with the face up tile on top of it, then the player opposite the dealer takes the following stack, and so on anticlockwise around the table, until each player has two stacks (10 tiles). Now the player to the dealer's right receives the whole of the next stack, but the player sitting opposite the dealer is given only the top 4 tiles of the following stack. The player to the dealer's left receives the last tile of this stack and 3 tiles from the top of the next stack, and finally the dealer takes the last 2 tiles from this stack and 2 from the next stack.

In the above diagram the dealer threw a 5, placed the spare tile on top of the 5th stack from her left. She then threw a 2, and took the second tile from the bottom of the selected stack and placed it on top. It is a red 4, so red 5s will be jokers for this deal. Now player 2 must take stack 'a', player 3 stack 'b', player 4 'c', player 1 'd', player 2 'e', player 3 'f', player 4 'g', player 1 'h' and player 2 'i'. Next player 3 takes the top 4 tiles of stack 'j', player 4 the last tile of 'j' and three from 'k', and player 1 two from 'k' and two from 'l'.

All the players should arrange their tiles so that they can see their faces but the other players cannot. Wooden racks are often used for this. The remaining tiles are left for the players to draw from during the game. They are moved to the middle of the table, without looking at them or disturbing their order.

== Play ==
Before the round starts, a player can score a point if the player holds the tile that matches the face-up tile. If the player doesn't show the tile to others, it will miss out the point.

Now the player to the dealer's right begins the play by discarding one tile, face up. After this, each player in turn may either take the tile just discarded by the previous player, or draw the next tile from the supply in the centre of the table, and must then discard one unwanted tile. This continues in anticlockwise rotation until a player forms a winning hand and exposes it, ending the play.

Discarded tiles are placed to the right of the player who discarded them, in a stack, so that only the most recent discard in the stack is visible.

The usual rule is that the player is allowed to look through all the tiles in the discard stacks to their right (tiles they discarded) and to their left (tiles they had an opportunity to take), but they can only see the exposed top tiles of the two discard stacks on the other side of the table.

Tiles are always drawn from the top of the next available stack. When only the final stack of 6 tiles remains, the exposed tile is removed from the top of this stack and the other five tiles are drawn in order. The exposed tile (the red 4 in the example diagrams) can never be drawn. When there are no tiles left in the centre except the single exposed tile, if the next player to play does not want to take the previous player's discard, the play ends because there are no cards left to draw.

=== Winning conditions ===
There are multiple ways for a player to win a round. The object of the game is to have a rack full of runs, sets or seven pairs.

A run is composed of three or more, same-colored tiles, in consecutive number order. (After 13, a 1 may follow but it can't continue after 1)

Example run:	9 10 11

A set is made from three or four same-value tiles in distinct colors.

Example set:	7 7 7

Another type of winning hand consists of having at least seven pairs. Two identical tiles (same number and colour) is called a pair.

Example of seven pairs:	4 4 2 2 9 9 5 5 13 13 7 7 4 4

If a player has a winning hand, he or she must show it to the other players. The other players then check whether all of 14 tiles of the player are grouped correctly. Apart from the discarded tiles and the face up tile on top of the six-tile stack, no tiles are exposed until a player shows a winning hand: no sets or runs are exposed during the game.

=== Examples of invalid groupings ===
Invalid because numbers are not consecutive:	1 2 4
Invalid because numbers in a run must all be the same color:	1 2 3
Invalid because colors may not repeat in a set:	1 1 1

The 1 can be used as the lowest tile, below the 2, or as the highest tile, above the 13, but not both at once. So black 1-2-3 or black 12-13-1 would be valid runs, but black 13-1-2 would not be valid.

=== Usage of jokers and false jokers ===
As previously explained, the two tiles that are the same colour as the face up tile and one greater in number are the jokers. These tiles can be used to represent any tile the holder desires, in order to complete a set or run. Assuming a round with red 5 as being the joker:

Example of using one joker (red 5) to form a set:	8 8 5

Example of using two jokers (red 5) to form a run:	6 5 5 9

Example of using one joker (red 5) to form seven pairs:	4 4 2 2 9 9 5 5 13 13 7 7 4 5

The two false jokers - the tiles without numbers - are used only to represent the joker tiles. So for example when red 5s are jokers, the false jokers are played as red 5s: for example {red 4, false joker, red 6} is a run, and {black 5, green 5, yellow 5, false joker} is a set.

If the player has a winning hand of groups and runs using at least one joker, they do not have to expose it immediately. If they wish, they can continue playing in the hope of forming a winning hand plus a joker. If the player is able to end the game by discarding a joker and exposing their remaining 14 tiles as a winning hand, their win is worth twice as much as an ordinary win. Note that by continuing to play instead of exposing their ordinary win, the player run the risk that another player may complete a winning hand and expose it before they can achieve their double win, in which case they gain nothing for their concealed winning hand.

== Scoring ==
Each player begins the game with 20 points and loses points each time another player wins a game, as follows:

- 2 points: When a player wins a game, each of the other players loses 2 points.
- 4 points: When a player wins a game by discarding a joker, each other player loses 4 points.
- 4 points: When a player wins a game with seven pairs, each other player loses 4 points.
- 1 point: When a player, at the start of the game, shows the tile that matches the face up tile on the six-tile stack, each of the other players loses 1 point. This is known as gösterme (to show), and can only be claimed before the holder of the matching tile first draws a tile.

If the game ends without any player exposing a winning hand (because there are no tiles left to draw, and the player whose turn it is cannot win by taking the previous discard), then there is no score.

Play continues until any player's score reaches zero or less. The two players with the highest scores at that time are the winners and the two with the lowest scores are the losers.

== Variations ==
Some play that any player whose score reaches zero or less leaves the game, but the other players continue to play.

Some play that the players sitting opposite each other are partners. In practice partners cannot help each other much, except by cheating(!) [In the partnership game, presumably each team starts with 20 points, and when a player exposes a winning hand, the opposing team loses 2 or 4 points as appropriate. If a player shows the tile matching the exposed tile at the start, the other team loses 1 point.]

Some players use the exposed tile as the last tile to be drawn from the centre, when all the other tiles have been taken.

Some players omit the formal procedure for choosing the joker and distributing the tiles. Having shuffled the tiles face down on the table, each player simply takes any 14 tiles from the table (the player chosen to play first taking 15) and a tile is turned up to be the joker. When drawing tiles during the play, any face down tile can be taken from the stock on the table.

Some play that a player who wins a game with tiles of one colour only, the score is doubled: the other players lose 4 points if the winner discarded an ordinary tile, 8 points if the winner's final discard was a joker. Some only award this double score for a hand consisting entirely of red tiles or black tiles.

=== Okey 101 ===
This variant is played with four players over multiple rounds. The object of the game is to collect as few points as possible at the end of the game. The player who has the fewest points, after all of the rounds are completed, is declared the winner. Points are determined according to the face value of the tile (e.g. a red 3 = 3 points & a black 11 = 11 points). A round is completed when there are no more tiles left to draw from the bank or when one of the players has completed his/her hand (tiles on the rack). A game is played over a predetermined number of rounds (e.g. 3,5,7,9 or 11 rounds). All of the rounds must be completed before a winner is declared, not just a best of rounds.

==== Starting the game ====
After a random dealer is chosen, each player is given 21 tiles except for the dealer, who gets 22 tiles. The rest of the tiles go face down into the bank and one tile which indicates what the joker will be is turned face up. The game is played counter-clockwise. The dealer starts the game by throwing away one of his tiles. The turn then goes to the player on his right. A player starts their turn by either taking a tile from the bank or taking the tile thrown away by the previous player. The player then either 'opens' (puts his sets on the table) and/or adds to the sets already on the table. If the player cannot open they finish the turn by throwing away one of the tiles from their hand. A player must always throw away a tile to finish the turn, even when finishing their entire hand.

==== Joker ====
The tile that indicates what the joker will be changes each individual round. The two joker tiles (also called 'false jokers') are the same value as this tile's value plus 1. These jokers look different from the standard tiles and vary in appearance according to the tile set used. The actual jokers (which can represent any tile in the game) are the actual tiles that get replaced by the false jokers. If, for example, the indicator tile is a blue 5, the actual jokers are the two blue 6 tiles and the joker tiles (or false jokers) have the value of the blue 6.

==== Sets and opening ====
The minimum number of points required to open a player's hand is 101. In order to open, the player needs to create sets of either 3 or 4 identical numbered tiles of different colors (e.g. black 5, red 5 & blue 5) or running numbers of the same color (e.g. red 7, red 8, and red 9). A set must have a minimum of three tiles. Players are only allowed to add to existing sets on the table after they have opened with a minimum of 101 points already. Players are, of course, allowed to open and then add to other sets within the same turn. If a player takes the discarded tile from the previous player, they must always use that tile. If the player has not opened yet, he/she must open with that tile included. The player is not allowed to keep the tile in their hand. A player is allowed to take the discarded tile and then return it and still take from the bank without receiving a penalty.

==== Doubles ====
Another way to open a hand is with a minimum of five doubles. Doubles are two identical tiles. If a player opens with doubles, they are not allowed to lay normal sets. They are, however, allowed to add tiles to existing sets from other players on the table. If all four players open with doubles within one round, that round gets canceled and replayed. No players receive any penalties.

==== Point scoring and end of the game ====
In order to complete a round, a player must play all the sets from their hand and finish with discarding a tile. The other players receive penalty points.

- When a player finishes their hand they receive 101 minus points. The other players receive penalty points according to the total value of all of the tiles left in their hand. If they have not opened yet they automatically receive 202 penalty points instead.
- If a player finishes their hand by discarding the joker all points get doubled instead. The player the finished receives 202 minus points and players that have not opened receive 404 penalty points.
- If a player has opened with doubles instead of sets the points also get doubled at the end of the round. If he finishes his hand other players receive double penalty points. If another player finishes the round, the player that opened with doubles receive double the value of their remaining tiles in penalty points.
- If a player finishes their entire hand in one turn when none of the other players have opened yet all points get doubled as well. Points get doubled again if the player is also able to finish with a joker as well. In this case, the player that finished receives 404 minus points and all other players receive 808 penalty points.

When all of the rounds have finished, all penalty and minus points of all of the rounds are added together and the player with the fewest points is the winner.

==== Additional penalties ====
Players receive an additional penalty of 101 for the following actions. These penalties are added to the total points for that round.

- If a player has a joker left in their hand when another player finishes the round or the round had ended they receive a 101 penalty. When they have not opened yet they receive the standard total penalty of 202.
- If a player discards the joker they receive a 101 penalty.
- If a player tries to open, but does not have the required 101 points and they have to take back their tiles, they receive a 101 penalty.
- If a player throws away a tile that can be added to a set that is already on the table they receive a 101 penalty. This happens even if the player has not opened yet. The player does not receive a penalty if it is the last tile they discard when finishing their hand.
- If a player adds multiple tiles on the table and takes them back they receive a 101 penalty. The player is only allowed to take back the last tile they put down without a penalty.

==== Additional rules ====
If the indicator tile is a 13 the joker then becomes a 1. Sets of the same number are not allowed to have the same color in them (e.g. A blue 10, a red 10 & a blue 10 is not allowed). Running sets are not allowed to continue from 13 to the 1 (e.g. black 13, black 1 & black 2 is not allowed).

== See also ==
- Rummikub
