= Lemada =

Lemada Light Industries Inc. is an Israeli game manufacturer. It was founded in 1978 by Mariana and Micha Hertzano, the children of Ephraim Hertzano, who invented Rummikub, their most famous game. It is still run by the Hertzano family with their head office located in Moshav Magshimim, near Ben Gurion International Airport.

== About ==
The original parent company of Lemada was established in the early 50s by Ephraim Hertzano. Lemada Light Industries Ltd specializes in the development and manufacturing of board and educational games.

Rummikub is the third most popular game played by families in the world. Over 50 million Rummikub games have been sold in 54 different countries across 5 continents. The game has been printed in 26 different languages. The factory is based in Arad along with the head office spanning 6,000 sq. meters and employing 80 workers who manufacture over 3 million games a year using state-of-the-art machinery.

In the local Israeli market, games are sold under a different brand name. They are called "Kod Kod", which is the leading and older game company in the country having been in business for 55 years.

== See also ==
- List of game manufacturers
