= Talisman The Adventure =

Expansion to Talisman board game

Cover art by Christos Achilleos, 1986

Talisman The Adventure is a 1986 expansion to the Talisman board game, both produced by Games Workshop. The Adventure, which requires the original Second Edition board game, is incompatible with and has no counterpart for subsequent editions.

== Description ==
=== Contents ===
This expansion includes

- 37 new Adventure cards
- 11 new spells
- 8 new character cards
  - Centaur
  - Ninja
  - Ork
  - Samurai
  - Soldier
  - Warrior of Chaos
  - Witch Doctor
  - Woodsman
- 6 Alternate endings (See "Victory conditions")
- 6 character record sheets with which to organize character's attributes, followers and objects.
- rules sheet

=== Victory conditions ===
In the original game, the character who reached the Crown of Command first was the winner. In this supplement, when the player reaches the inner sanctum, the player draws an alternate ending card and encounters one of the following:

- Demon Lord: a powerful demonic being with Craft 12 and 4 Lives. If the player defeats the Demon Lord, the player wins the game. Otherwise, play continues.
- Pandora's Box: the character draws Adventure and spell cards to be used against his or her foes. Play continues.
- Hercules' Belt: a powerful artifact which gives the character 12 Strength and 5 lives. Play continues.
- Dragon King: a randomized finale with many possibilities.
- The Horrible Black Void: the character is sucked into the void and dies instantly. (If playing with the Talisman Timescape set, the character is transferred there instead.) Play continues.
- Crown of Command: as in the original version, the player wins the game.

If drawing one of the above does not result in the end of the game, the card that was drawn is replaced with a new random ending.

== Publication history ==
Games Workshop published Talisman in 1983, and followed up with several supplements, including Talisman The Adventure, which was designed by Edward Campbell, Charles Johnson, Alan Merrett, and Aly Morrison, with interior art by Aly Morrison, and cover art by Christos Achilleos.

== Metal miniatures ==
The supplement comes with small cards illustrating each character, which are then mounted in plastic bases to provide each player with a character token to move around the board. Games Workshop, through its subsidiary Citadel Miniatures, also offered metal miniatures of the characters for sale.

== Reception ==
Robert Neville reviewed Talisman The Adventure for White Dwarf #83, and stated that "This is just the thing for those irritatingly smug people who always win at Talisman – just watch their joy turn to misery as their beloved hero disappears down into the darkness. All in all, Talisman The Adventure is a fun package, and will do much to refresh the parts of Talisman that other expansion sets can't reach."
