= List of Israeli companies listed on the Nasdaq =

Israel had more companies listed in 2012 on the NASDAQ stock exchange than any country outside of the United States and China. As of 2011, some sixty Israeli companies are listed on the Nasdaq. 2000 was the year that saw the most new Israeli listings on the exchange – 33 companies. Through the years, many have been acquired, merged with other companies, privatized, or gone out of business. Since the 1980s, over 250 Israeli companies had an initial public offering on the Nasdaq. As of August 2017, one Israeli company was listed on the NASDAQ-100 index: Check Point Software.

== List of Israeli companies currently listed on Nasdaq ==
This is a list of Israeli companies currently listed on the NASDAQ electronic stock exchange.

Name	Ticker Symbol	Year Listed	Sector	Products / Solutions	Notes
Ayala Pharma	AYLA	2020	Biotech		
Polypid Ltd.	PYPD	2020	Pharma		
Allot Communications Ltd.	ALLT	2006	Networking & communication	Broadband service optimization	Dual listed on TASE
Anchiano Therapeutics Ltd.	ANCN	2019	Biopharmaceuticals	Cancer drug development	
Arcturus Therapeutics Holdings Inc.	ARCT	2013	Biotech	RNA treatment	
AudioCodes Ltd.	AUDC	1999	Networking & communication	VoIP	Dual listed on TASE
B.O.S. Better Online Solutions	BOSC	1996	Wireless technology	RFID and Supply Chain solutions	
BioLineRx Ltd.	BLRX	2011	Biopharmaceuticals		Dual listed on TASE
BiondVax Pharmaceuticals Ltd	BVXV	2015	Pharmaceuticals	Infectious diseases	
Brainstorm Cell Therapeutics Inc	BCLI	2004	Biotech		
Brainsway Ltd.	BWAY	2019	Biotech	Neural medical devices	
CollPlant Biotechnologies Ltd.	CLGN	2018	Biotech	3D bioprinting organs	
Caesarstone	CSTE	2012	Home building	Quartz surfaces	
Camtek Intelligent Imaging Ltd.	CAMT	2000	Industrial equipment	Automated optical inspection for PCB manufacturing	Dual listed on TASE
Ceragon Networks Ltd.	CRNT	2000	Wireless technology		Dual listed on TASE
CEVA, Inc.	CEVA	2002	Semiconductors	Silicon intellectual property provider for DSP solutions	
Check-Cap Ltd.	CHEK	2015	Medical equipment	C-Scan System for colorectal polyps detection	
Check Point Software Technologies Ltd.	CHKP	1996	IT Security		
CYREN Ltd. (previously Commtouch)	CYRN	1999	Internet Security	Web Security, Email Security, Anti-Malware	Dual listed on TASE
Compugen Ltd.	CGEN	2000	Biotech		Dual listed on TASE
CyberArk	CYBR	2014	Software		
DarioHealth Corp.	DRIO	2016	Healthcare	health monitoring by phone	
DSP Group, Inc.	DSPG	1994	Semiconductors	Fabless DSP solutions	
Elbit Systems Ltd.	ESLT	1996	Defense		Dual listed on TASE
Eltek Ltd.	ELTK	1997	Electronic components	Printed circuit boards (PCB) manufacturer	
Entera Bio Ltd.	ENTX	2018	Pharmaceuticals		
Evogene Ltd.	EVGN	2010	Biotech		
Foresight Autonomous Holdings Ltd.	FRSX	2017	Software	Autonomous vehicle systems	
ForeScout Technologies	FSCT	2017	IT Security		
Formula Systems (1985) Ltd.	FORTY	1997	Holding Company		Dual listed on TASE
Galmed Pharmaceuticals Ltd.	GLMD	2014	Pharmaceuticals		
Gamida Cell Ltd.	GMDA	2018	Biotech		
G. Willi-Food International, Ltd.	WILC	2005	Food dist		Dual listed on TASE
Gilat Satellite Networks Ltd.	GILT	1993	Networking & communication	Satellite receivers	Dual listed on TASE
InMode Ltd.	INMD	2019	Medical equipment	Skin-related procedures	
Intec Pharma Ltd.	NTEC	2015	Pharmaceuticals		
Itamar Medical Ltd.	ITMR	2019	Medical equipment	Non-invasive cardiology devices	
Ituran Location and Control Ltd.	ITRN	2005	Communication services	location-based services	Dual listed on TASE
Kamada Ltd.	KMDA	2013	Biopharmaceuticals		
JFrog Ltd.	FROG	2020	Software		
Kitov Pharma Ltd	KTOV	2015	Pharmaceuticals		
Kornit Digital	KRNT	2015	Printing	Inkjet printers for the garment and apparel decorating industry	
Magal Security Systems	MAGS	1993	Security Systems		
Magic Software Enterprises Ltd.	MGIC	1991	Software		Dual listed on TASE
Medigus Ltd.	MDGS	2015	Medical equipment	Minimally invasive endosurgical tools	Dual listed on TASE
Mediwound Ltd	MDWD	2014	Biotech		
MER Telemanagement Solutions Ltd.	MTSL	2004	Networking & communication		
Microbot Medical Inc.	MBOT	1992	Medical equipment	Micro-surgery robots	
Micronet Enertec Technologies Inc	MICT	2004	Defense		
Mind CTI Ltd.	MNDO	2002	Networking & communication	Billing solutions	
monday.com	MNDY	2021	Software	Work OS	
Motus GI Holdings, Inc.	MOTS	2018	Medical equipment	colonoscopy device	
My Size, Inc.	MYSZ	2016	Software	E-commerce clothing sizer	
Nano Dimension Ltd.	NNDM	2016	Printing	Digital printers for Printed circuit boards	
Nano-X Imaging Ltd.	NNOX	2020	Medical equipment	Nano-scale X-ray imaging	
NICE Systems Limited	NICE	1996	Networking & communication		Dual listed on TASE
Nova Measuring Instruments Ltd.	NVMI	2000	Industrial equipment		Dual listed on TASE
Optibase Ltd.	OBAS	1999	Networking & communication	Internet protocol television (IPTV)	
Oramed Pharmaceuticals, Inc.	ORMP	2013	Pharmaceuticals	Oral insulin capsule	
Partner Communications Company Ltd.	PTNR	2000	Communication services		Dual listed on TASE
Perion Network Ltd.	PERI	2006	Software		Dual listed on TASE
Pluristem Therapeutics Inc.	PSTI	2003	Biotech	Stem cell therapeutic products	Dual listed on TASE
RADA Electronic Industries Ltd.	RADA	1985	Aerospace		
Radcom Ltd.	RDCM	1997	Networking & communication		Part of the RAD Group
Radware Ltd.	RDWR	1999	Networking & communication		Part of the RAD Group
RedHill Biopharma Ltd.	RDHL	2013	Biopharmaceutical	Gastrointestinal treatment	
ReWalk	RWLK	2014	Medical equipment		
Safe-T Group Ltd	SFET	2018	Software	Cyber-security	
Sapiens International Corporation N.V.	SPNS	1992	Software		Dual listed on TASE
Silicom Ltd	SILC	1994	Networking & communication		Part of the RAD Group
Sol-Gel Technologies Ltd.	SLGL	2018	Pharmaceutical	Skin treatments	
SolarEdge	SEDG	2015	Renewable energy	Photovoltaic systems	
Supercom Ltd	SPCB	2006	Security Systems		
TAT Technologies Ltd.	TATT	1988	Defense	Environmental control systems	Dual listed on TASE
Tower Semiconductor Ltd.	TSEM	1994	Semiconductors		Dual listed on TASE
UroGen Pharma Ltd.	URGN	2017	Biopharmaceuticals	Cancer and urologic treatments	
Varonis Systems	VRNS	2014	IT Security	Data and access control	
Vascular Biogenics Ltd.	VBLT	2014	Biopharmaceuticals	Cancer treatment	
Verint Systems Inc.	VRNT	2002	Networking & communication		
Wix.com	WIX	2013	Internet		
XTEND AI Robotics Inc	XTND	2026	Defense / AI		Merged with JFB Construction Holdings at a $1.5B valuation; investors included Eric Trump and Unusual Machines.
XTL Biopharmaceuticals Ltd.	XTLB	2002	Biotech		
Playtika	PLTK	2021	Gaming		

== List of Israeli companies formerly listed on Nasdaq ==
Name	Ticker Symbol	Year Listed	Year Delisted	Sector	Fate
Ability Inc	ABILF	2016	2018	Mobile Security	Now OTC.
Accord Networks Ltd.	ACCD	2000	2000	Networking & communications	Acquired by Polycom for Approximately $339 Million
Accent Software International Ltd.	ACNTF	1992	2004	Software	
ACRO Inc	ACRI	2007	2016	Defense	
ACS Motion Control Ltd.	ACSEF	1999		Electronic components	Now OTC.
Aladdin Knowledge Systems Limited	ALDN	1993	2009	IT Security	Acquired by Vector Capital
Alcobra Ltd.	ADHD	2013		Pharmaceuticals	Merged with Arcturus Therapeutics, Inc.
Alvarion Ltd.	ALVRQ	2000		Wireless technology	Dual listed on TASE. Now OTC.
Ampal-American Israel Corporation	AMPLQ	1979		Holding Company	Went bankrupt in 2013
Answers Corporation	ANSW	2004	2011	Internet	Acquired by AFCV Holdings
Arel Communications and Software	ARLCF	1994	2006	Software	Gone private
Ariely Advertising Ltd.	RELEF	1992	1998	Advertising	Acquired by Publicis
Arzan International Ltd.	ARZNF			Semiconductors	
Attunity Ltd.	ATTU	1992	2019	Software	Acquired by Qlik
BackWeb Technologies Ltd.	BWEB	1998	2007	Software	Bid price less than min. requirement.
B Communications	BCOM	2007	2020	Telecommunications	Voluntary delisting. Dual listed on TASE
Baran Group Ltd.	BRAN	2002	2004	Engineering services	Delisted from NASDAQ but still listed on TASE
BigBand Networks, Inc.	BBND	2007	2004	Networking & communication	Acquired by ARRIS for $172 million.
BluePhoenix Solutions Ltd.	BPHX	1997		Software	See ModSys International Ltd.
BVR Systems (1998) Ltd.	BVRSF	2004	2009	Defense	Acquired by Elbit Systems for $34 million.
Cellcom Israel Ltd.	CEL	2009		Wireless	Moved to NYSE. Dual listed on TASE.
Cell Kinetics Ltd.	CKNTF	2008	2020	Biotech	OTC - pink, possibly delisted
Cicero Inc.	CICN	1996	2003	Formerly traded as Level 8 Systems Inc (LVEL).	
Cimatron, Limited	CIMT	1996		Software	Privatized
ClickSoftware Technologies Ltd.	CKSW	2000		Software	Privatized
Comverse Technology, Inc.	CMVT	1999		Networking & communication	Privatized
Crow Technologies 1977 Ltd.	CRWTF	2004		Security Systems	Now OTC
D. Medical Industries Ltd.	DMED	2010	2012	Medical devices	Failure to meet Nasdaq requirements
Delta Galil Industries	DELT	1999	2008	Manufacturing	Voluntarily delisted.
Deltathree, Inc.	DDDC	1999	2008	Communication services	Bid price less than min. requirement
DSP Communications Ltd.	DSPC	2000	2001	Semiconductors	Bought by Intel for U$1.6 bn
ECI Telecom Ltd.	ECIL	1982	2007	Networking & communications	Acquired by Swarth Group from US$1.2 billion
ECtel Ltd.	ECTX	1999	2010	Networking & communication	Acquired by cVidya for $21 million
Edusoft Ltd.	EDUSF	1992	1998	Software	Acquired by CINAR Corporation for US$40 million
Elbit Medical Imaging Ltd.	EMITF	1996	Holding Company		OTC - pink
Elbit	ELBT	1996	2002	Holding company	Merged with its parent company Elron
Elbit Vision	EVSNF	1996	2003	Industrial equipment	Shareholders' equity less than min. requirement.
Ellomay Capital Ltd.	EMYCF	1999	2005	Holding Company	Shareholders' equity less than min. requirement.
Elron Electronic Industries Ltd.	ELRN	1981	2010	Holding Company	Voluntarily delisted
Elscint Ltd.	ELT	1972	1999	Medical Equipment	Acquired by Philips Electronics for $1.1 billion
Enzymotec Ltd	ENZY	2013	2018	Biotech	Acquired by Frutarom for $168 million
EZchip Semiconductor Ltd.	EZCH	1992	2016	Semiconductors	Privatized. Dual listed on TASE
e-SIM LTD.	ESIM	2000	2007	Software	
ForeScout Technologies	FSCT	2017	2020	IT Security	Class action lawsuit
Fundtech Ltd.	FNDT	1998	2011	Software	Acquired for $390 million, merged with GTCR affiliate BankServ
Galileo Technology Ltd	GALT	1996	2001	Semiconductors	Acquired by Marvell Technology Group
GammaCan International, Inc.	GCAN	2004		Biotech	Didn't report filings to the SEC in 2012. Ticker now under The Greater Cannabis Company, Inc.
Geotek Communications Ltd	GOTK			Networking & communications	
Given Imaging Ltd.	GIVN	2001		Medical equipment	Dual listed on TASE. Privatized.
Home Centers DIY Ltd.	HOMEF			Retail	
ICTS International N.V.	ICTSF	1997		Security services	OTC - Pink
Internet Gold Golden Lines Ltd.	IGLDF	2004		Communication services	Dual listed on TASE. OTC - Pink
Indigo NV	INDGF	1992	2002	Digital Presses	Acquired by Hewlett-Packard for $680 million
Inksure Technologies Inc.	INKS	2002	2013	Security Systems	Merged with Spectra Systems Corporation (SPSY.L or SPSC.L)
Intelligent Information Systems Ltd.	IISLF	2004		Software	Privatized
Israel Land Development Company Ltd.	ILDCY		2004	Holding company	
Isramco, Inc.	ISRA-L.TA	1983		Oil exploration	Moved to TASE
IXI Mobile, Inc.	IXIM	2002		Networking & communication	Privatized
Jacada Ltd.	JCDAF	1999		Software	OTC - Pink
Laser Industries Ltd.	LASRF	1992	1997	Medical Equipment	Merged with ESC Medical Systems Ltd. (Now called Lumenis Ltd.)
Lipman Electronic Engineering Ltd.	LPMA	1994	2006	POS solutions	Acquired by VeriFone for $793 million
Logal Educational Software	LOGLF	1996		Software	
Lumenis	LMNS	1992	2007	Medical Equipment	Acquired by LM Partners L.P. and Ofer Hi-Tech Group
Macrocure Ltd	MCUR	2014		Biotech	Privatized
Madge Network NV	MADGF		2003	Networking & communications	
magicJack VocalTec Ltd.	CALL	1996		Networking & communication	Privatized. Formerly VocalTec Communications Ltd.
Matav-Cable Systems Media Ltd.	MATV	1996	2004	Communication services	Merged with competitor to form HOT Telecommunication Systems
Mazor Robotics	MZOR	2013		Medical equipment	Dual listed on TASE. Merged with Medtronic.
Medis Technologies Ltd.	MDTL	2009	2009	Alternative Energy	Net worth less than min. requirement.
Mellanox Technologies, Ltd.	MLNX	2007	2020	Semiconductors	Acquired by Nvidia $6.9 billion
Menlo Therapeutics Inc.	FOMX	2014		Pharmaceuticals	New name due to Foamix Pharmaceuticals Ltd merger
Memco Software Ltd.	MEMCF	1996	1998	Software	Merged with Platinum Technology later acquired by Computer Associates.
Mercury Interactive Corp	MERQ	1996	2006	Software	Acquired by HP $4.5 billion
Metalink, Ltd.	MTLK	2004	2011	Semiconductors	Bid price less than min. requirement.
ModSys International Ltd.	MDSYF			Software	Changed name from BluePhoenix Solutions Ltd. in 2014. Was MDSY, now OTC.
M-Systems Flash Disk Pioneers Ltd.	FLSH	1998	2006	Semiconductors	Acquired by SanDisk.
m-Wise, Inc.	MWIS	2005		Wireless technology	Privatized.
NDS Group PLC	NDSS	1998	2009	Digital TV solutions	Acquired by Permira Private Equity
Ness Technologies, Inc.	NSTC	2004	2011	IT Services	Acquired by Citi Venture Capital International (US$307 million)
NetManage Inc	NETM	1992	2008	Software	Acquired by Micro Focus International .
New Dimension Software, Ltd.	DDDDF	1993	1999	Software	Acquired by BMC Software for US$650 million
NexGen Biofuels Ltd.	HCTL, NXGNF, NXGN	1989		Alternative Energy	New name: Laxai Pharma Ltd.
Nogatech, Ltd.	NGTC	2000	2001	Semiconductors	Acquired by Zoran
NUR Macroprinters Ltd.	NURM	1998	2007	Digital Presses	Acquired by Hewlett-Packard
On Track Innovations Ltd	OTIVF	2002		Security Systems	Now OTC - Pink
Orbotech Ltd.	ORBK	1984		Industrial equipment	Acquired by KLA-Tencor Corporation (KLAC)
Orckit Communications, Limited	ORCT	1996		Networking & communication	Privatized. Dual listed on TASE
OrganiTECH USA, Inc.	ORGT	2007	2014	Biotech	Revoked by SEC for not filing a petition.
Optomedic Medical Technologies Ltd.	KPLNF	1998	2005	Medical Technologies	
Oshap Technologies Ltd.	OSHSF	1993	1999	Software	Acquired by Sungard
Perrigo Company plc	PRGO	1992		Pharmaceuticals	Moved to NYSE.
Pharmos Corporation	PARS	2002	2009	Shareholders' equity less than min. requirement.	
Pointer Telocation Ltd.	PNTR	2004	2019	Security services	Dual listed on TASE
PowerDsine Ltd.	PDSN	2004	2006	Semiconductors	Acquired by Microsemi Corporation
Precise Software Solutions Ltd	PRSE	1999	2003	Software	Acquired by Veritas Software (later part of Symantec) for $609 million, span-off in 2008
PROLOR Biotech, Inc.	PBTH	2008	2013	Biotech	Merged with OPKO Health, Inc. Dual listed on TASE
RadView Software Ltd.	RDVWF	2000		Software	OTC - Pink
RADVision Ltd.	RVSN	2000		Networking & communication	Privatized. Part of the RAD Group
Retalix Ltd.	RTLX	1998	2013	Software	Acquired by NCR Corporation for $650 million.
RiT Technologies Ltd.	RITT	1997	Networking & communication		OTC - Pink. Part of the RAD Group
RoboGroup T.E.K. Ltd.	ROBOF	1999	2005	Industrial equipment	Voluntarily delisted.
Robomatix Technologies Ltd	RBMXF			Holding company	
Rosetta Genomics	ROSGQ	2007		Biotech	OTC - Pink
RR Media Ltd.	RRM	2007		Digital media services	Privatized
Saifun Semiconductors Ltd.	SFUN	2004	2008	Semiconductors	Acquired by Spansion Inc.
Scailex Corporation Ltd.	SCIX	1980	2006	Holding Company	
Scanvec (1990) Ltd.	SVECF			Software	
Scopus Video Networks Ltd.	SCOP	2005	2009	Networking & communications	Acquired by Harmonic Inc.
Shamir Optical Industry Ltd.	SHMR	2005	2011	Spectacle lens	Merged with Essilor
SignalSoft Corporation	SGSF	2000	2002	Software	Acquired by Openwave Systems Inc.
Shopping.com Ltd.	SHOP	2004	2005	Software	Acquired by eBay for $634 million
Sodastream International	SODA	2010	2018	Food and beverage	Acquired by PepsiCo
Starlims Technologies Limited	LIMS	2007	2010	Software	Acquired by Abbott in 2010 for $123 million.
Summit Design, Inc.	SMMT	1994	1999	Software	Acquired by Mentor Graphics
Syneron Medical Ltd.	ELOS	2004	2017	Medical equipment	Also known as Syneron Candela. Acquired by Apax Partners.
Tadiran Telecommunications Ltd.	TTELF	1982	1998	Networking & communications	Merged with ECI Telecom
Taro Pharmaceutical Industries Ltd.	TARO	1998	2006	Pharmaceuticals	Delayed SEC forms; acquired by Sun Pharmaceuticals in 2010. Moved to NYSE on 22 March 2012
Technoprises Ltd.	TNOLF	1999	2010	Holding Company	Formerly known as BVR Technologies Ltd. Revoked by SEC.
Tecnomatix Technologies Ltd.	TCNOF	1996	2004	Software	Acquired by UGS Corp.
Tefron Ltd.	TFRFF	1996		Manufacturing	OTC - Pink
Teledata Communications Ltd.	TLDCF	1994	1998	Software	Acquired by ADC Telecommunications for $200 million, later sold and now trading as Teledata Networks
Terayon Communication Systems, Inc.	TERN	1998	2007	Networking & communications	Acquired by Motorola for $140 million
Teva Pharmaceutical Industries Limited	TEVA	1982	2012	Pharmaceuticals	Transferred to NYSE
Tissera Inc.	TSSR	2004	2014	Biotech	Revoked by SEC for not filing a petition.
Top Image Systems, Ltd.	TISA	1996	2019	Software	Acquired by Kofax
TTI Team Telecom International Ltd.	TTIL	1996	2010	Networking & communication	Acquired by TEOCO Corporation for $58 million.
TTR Technologies Inc.	TTRE	1995	2002	Digital anti-piracy technologies	Acquired by Macrovision
TVG Technologies Ltd.	TVGTF	1993	2001	IT Security	
Ulticom, Inc.	ULCM	2000	2010	Networking & communication	Acquired from Comverse Technology by Platinum Equity for $90 million
Veraz Networks	VRAZ	2007		Networking & communication	Privatized
Verisity Ltd.	VRST	1999	2005	Software	Acquired by Cadence Design Systems for $281 million
ViryaNet Ltd.	VRYA	1999	2008	Software	
Voltaire Ltd.	VOLT	2007	2011	Networking & communication	Acquired by Mellanox Technologies for $208 million
Vuance Ltd	VUNC	2006	2009	Security Systems	Shareholders' equity less than min. requirement
Vyyo Inc.	VYYO	1999	2008	Networking & communications	Gone private
Wiztec Solutions Ltd.	WIZTF	1994	2000	Networking & communications	Acquired by Convergys Corporation
ZAG Industries Ltd.	ZAGIF	1992	1998	Plastic products manufacturer	Acquired by Stanley Works for $117 million
Zion Oil & Gas, Inc.	ZN	2007	2020	Oil Exploration	
Zoran Corporation	ZRAN	1995	2011	Semiconductors	Acquired by CSR plc

== See also ==
- List of Israeli companies
- List of Israeli companies quoted on the ASX
- List of multinationals with research and development centres in Israel
- Science and technology in Israel
- Silicon Wadi
