= Science and technology in Israel =

National research, development and proficience of Israel

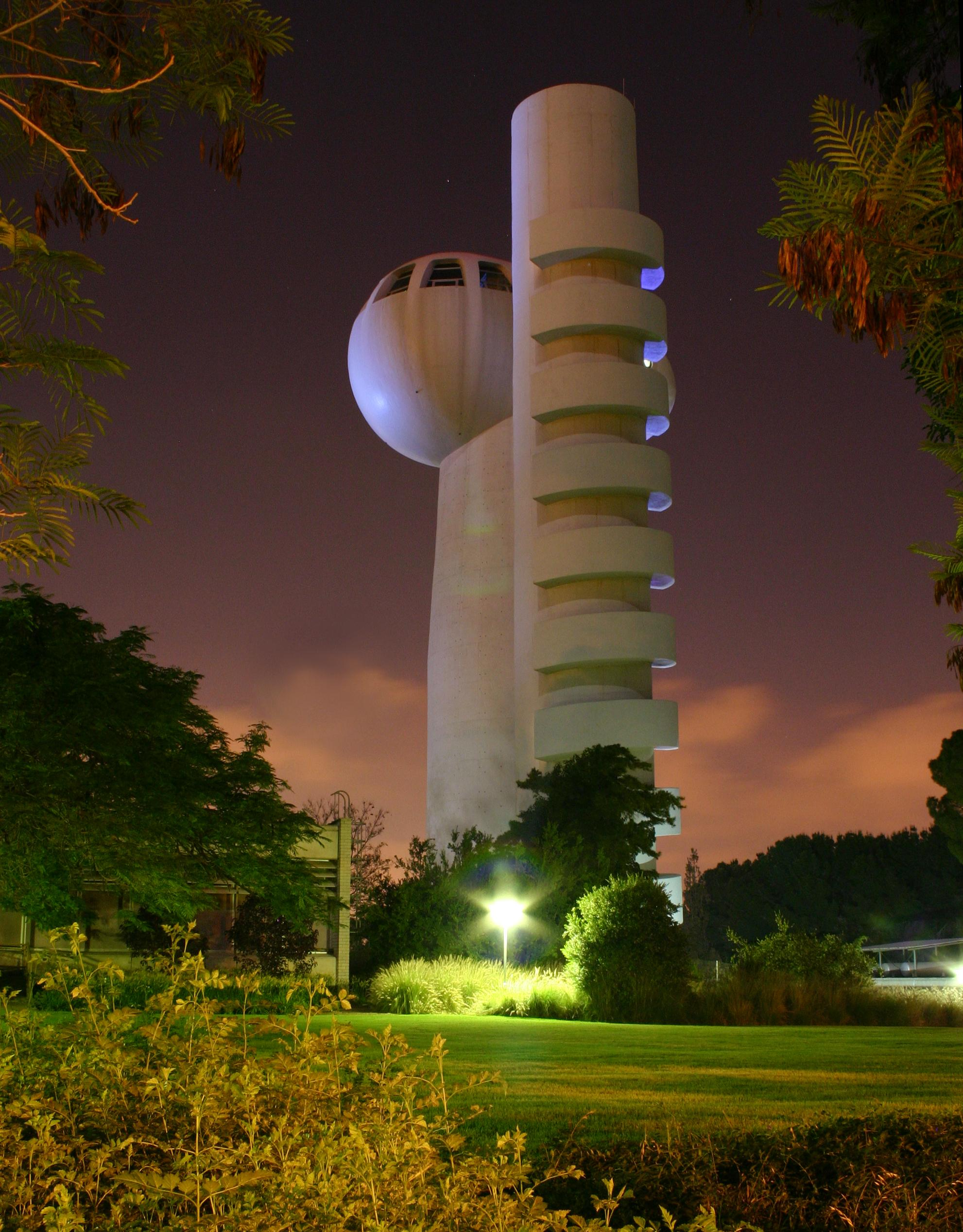
Koffler particle accelerator, Weizmann institute

Science and technology in Israel is one of the country's most developed sectors. In 2019, Israel was ranked the world's seventh most innovative country by the Bloomberg Innovation Index.

Israel counts 140 scientists and technicians per 10,000 employees, one of the highest ratios in the world. In comparison, there are 85 per 10,000 in the United States and 83 per 10,000 in Japan. In 2012, Israel counted 8,337 full-time equivalent researchers per million inhabitants. This compares with 3,984 in the US, 6,533 in the Republic of South Korea and 5,195 in Japan.

Israel is home to major companies in the high-tech industry. In 1998, Tel Aviv was named by Newsweek as one of the ten most technologically influential cities in the world. Since 2000, Israel has been a member of EUREKA, the pan-European research and development funding and coordination organization, and held the rotating chairmanship of the organization for 2010–2011. In 2010, American journalist David Kaufman wrote that the high-tech area of Yokneam, Israel, has the "world's largest concentration of aesthetics-technology companies". Google chairman Eric Schmidt complimented the country during a visit there, saying that “Israel has the most important high-tech center in the world after the US.” It is ranked 14th in the Global Innovation Index in 2025 and 2026. The Tel Aviv region was ranked the fourth global tech ecosystem in the world.

== History ==
Jewish settlement in Israel was motivated by both ideology and flight from persecution. Return to the homeland was an important aspect of Jewish immigration and was perceived by many as a return to the soil. To establish the rural villages that formed the core of Zionist ideology and produce self-supporting Jewish farmers, agronomic experiments were conducted. The foundations of agricultural research in Israel were laid by the teachers and graduates of the Mikveh Yisrael School, the country's first agricultural school, established by the Alliance Israelite Universelle in 1870. On a field trip to Mount Hermon in 1906, the agronomist Aaron Aaronsohn discovered Triticum dicoccoides, or emmer wheat, believed to be the "mother of all wheat." In 1909, he founded an agricultural research station in Atlit where he built up an extensive library and collected geological and botanical samples. The Agricultural Station, founded in Rehovot in 1921, engaged in soil research and other aspects of farming in the country's difficult climatic conditions. This station, which became the Agricultural Research Organization (ARO), is now Israel's major institution of agricultural research and development.

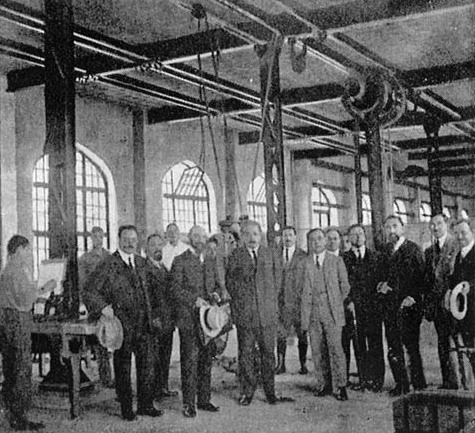
Albert Einstein at the Technion in 1923

In 1912, the first cornerstone of the Technion - Israel Institute of Technology was laid at a festive ceremony in Haifa, which was then occupied by the Ottoman Empire. The Technion would become a unique university worldwide in its claim to precede and create a nation. As Jews were often barred from technical education in Europe, the Technion claims to have brought the skills needed to build a modern state.

Established before World War I, the Hebrew Health Station in Jerusalem, founded by Nathan Straus engaged in medical and public health research, operating departments for public hygiene, eye diseases and bacteriology. The station manufactured vaccines against typhus and cholera, and developed methods of pest control to eliminate field mice. The Pasteur Institute affiliated with the station developed a rabies vaccine. Departments for microbiology, biochemistry, bacteriology, and hygiene were opened at the Hebrew University of Jerusalem, founded on Mount Scopus in 1925. In 1936, Jewish workers in the center of the country donated two-days' pay toward the establishment of the "Hospital of Judea and Sharon," later renamed Beilinson Hospital. In 1938, Beilinson established the country's first blood bank. The Rothschild-Hadassah University Hospital on Mount Scopus opened in 1939 and was the first teaching hospital and medical center in the country. Since renamed the Hadassah Medical Center, it has become a leader in medical research.

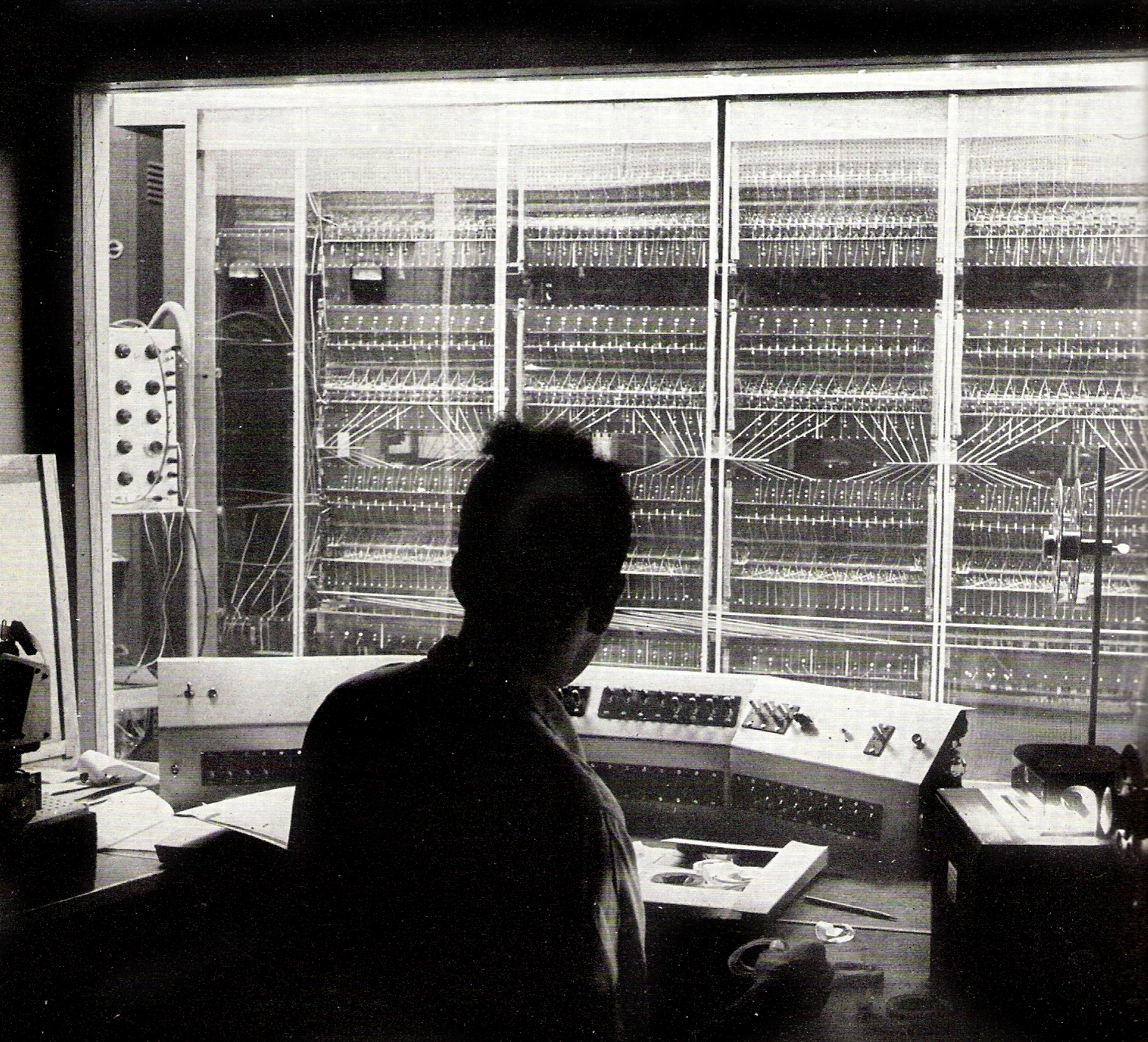
WEIZAC in 1954, the first modern computer in the Middle East

Industrial research began at the Technion - Israel Institute of Technology, was also initiated at the Daniel Sieff Research Center (later the Weizmann Institute of Science), established in 1934 in Rehovot. The Dead Sea Laboratories opened in the 1930s. The first modern electronic computer in Israel and the Middle East, and one of the first large-scale, stored-program, electronic computers in the world, called WEIZAC, was built at the Weizmann Institute during 1954–1955, based on the Institute for Advanced Study (IAS) architecture developed by John von Neumann. WEIZAC has been recognized by the IEEE as a milestone in the history of electrical engineering and computing. IBM Israel, registered on June 8, 1950, was the country's first high-tech firm. The company, located on Allenby Street in Tel Aviv, assembled and repaired punch card machines, sorting machines and tabulators. In 1956, a local plant was opened to produce punch cards, and a year later, the first service center opened, offering computerized data processing services.

Scientific and technological research in Israel was boosted by the appointment of a chief scientist for the Industry and Trade Ministry at the recommendation of a committee headed by Ephraim Katzir, later president of Israel. The Israeli government provided grants that covered 50–80 percent of the outlay for new start-ups, with no conditions, no shareholding and no participation in management. In the early 1980s, Control Data Corporation, a partner in Elron Electronic Industries, formed the country's first venture capital firm.

The Israel Innovation Authority warned in September 2025 of a slump in tech manufacturing. The tech sector is the largest and fastest-growing driver of growth in the Israeli economy. However, the sector has experienced stagnant employment and manufacturing growth, as hiring has not been matched by investment in startups.

=== Origins of Israeli high-tech industry ===
Israel's high-technology industries are a spin-off of the rapid development of computer science and technology in the 1980s in such places as Silicon Valley and Massachusetts Route 128 in the US, which ushered in the current high-tech era. Up until that point, Israel's economy had been essentially based on agriculture, mining and secondary sectors such as diamond polishing and manufacturing in textiles, fertilizers and plastics.

The key factor which enabled high-tech industries based on information and communication technologies to take root and flourish in Israel was investment by the defense and aerospace industries, which spawned new technologies and know-how. Israel devoted 17.1% of its GDP to military expenditure in 1988. Even though this share had dropped to 5.8% of GDP by 2016, Israel military spending remains among the highest in the world. For the purposes of comparison, the United States devoted 5.7% of its GDP to military expenditure in 1988 and 3.3% in 2016. This heavy investment in defense and aerospace formed the basis for Israel's high-tech industries in medical devices, electronics, telecommunications, computer software and hardware.

The massive Russian immigration of the 1990s reinforced this phenomenon, doubling the number of engineers and scientists in Israel overnight. Between 1989 and 2006, about 979,000 Russian Jews and their relatives migrated to Israel, which had a population of just 4.5 million in 1989. These immigrants were extremely educated and quickly assimilated into Israeli society. More than 55% of them had a high level of education and one of the highest rates globally were engineers, architects, physicians, technicians, and other professionals. This huge immigration boosted the Israeli economy and high-tech sector significantly.

The purchase of Mirabilis in 1998 marked the first big exit of high technology in Israel and caused a rush of Israeli companies as part of the Dot-com bubble.

=== Contemporary high-tech industry in Israel ===
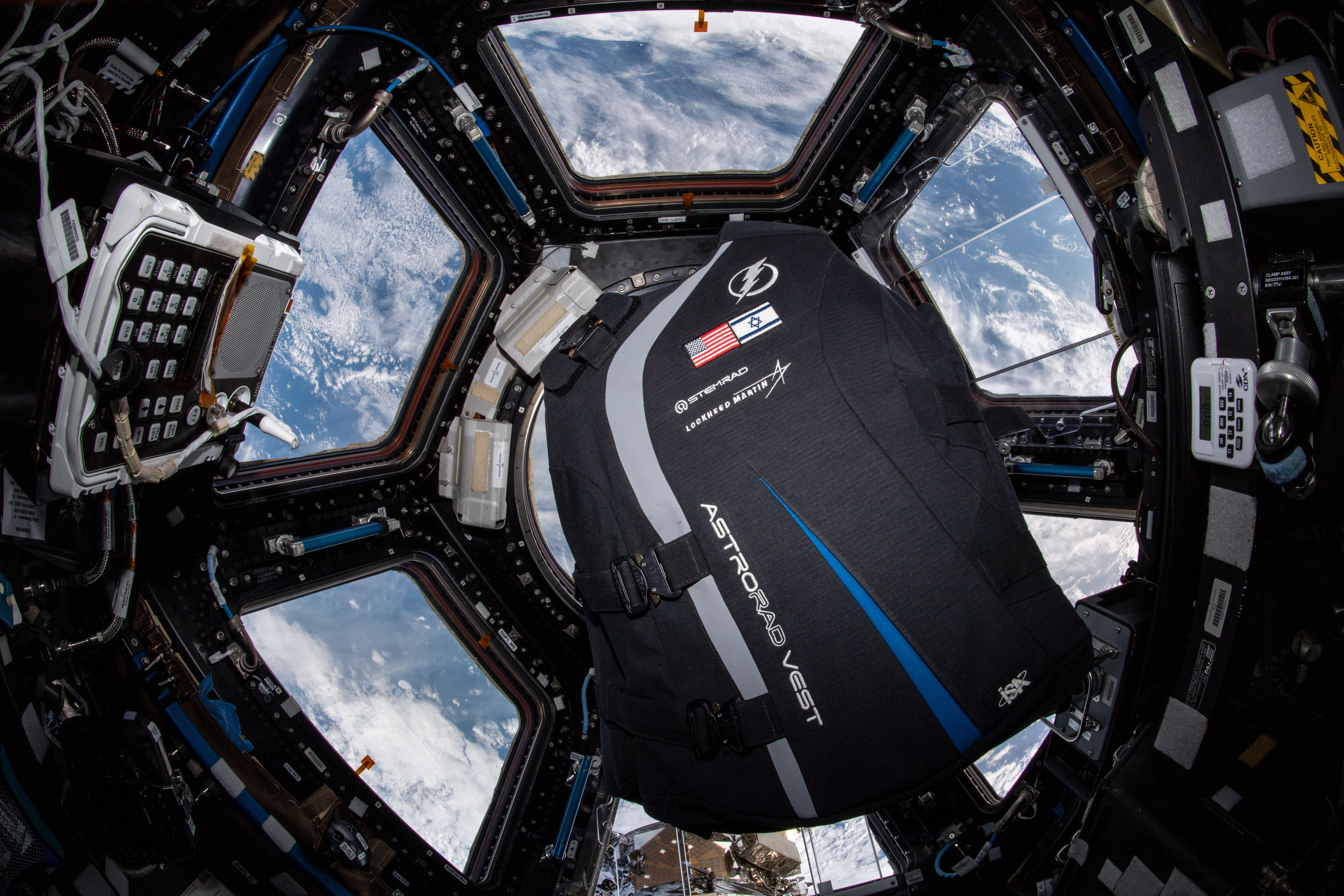
Israeli StemRad astronaut anti radiation suit, picture by NASA

Currently, Israel has the world's most research-intensive business sector. In 2018, 4.95% of its GDP was invested in research and technology. Meanwhile, Israel's technology sector plays a crucial role in the country's economy. In 2021, the Israeli high-technology sector accounted for around 12% of the country's economic output and 10% of its national labour force.

Competitive grants and tax incentives are the two main public policy instruments in supporting business research and development. Government incentives and the availability of a skilled workforce have contributed to multinational corporations establishing research and development centers in Israel. The country's national innovation ecosystem includes foreign multinationals and large corporate investors in research and development, alongside start-ups.

As of 2019, some 530 foreign research centres were currently active in Israel. Many of these centers are owned by large multinational firms that have acquired Israeli companies, technology and know-how and transformed them through mergers and acquisitions into their own local research facilities. The activity of some research centers even spans more than three decades, such as those of Intel, Applied Materials, Motorola, and IBM.

In the late 2010s, Israel saw a sharp increase in the number of high-technology startups that achieved 'unicorn status' (a financing round at a valuation of $1 billion or more): in 2016, Israel had 10 such startups. By 2019, the number had risen to 19. Be the end of 2021, 74 tech unicorns had emerged from Israel's tech sector - 33 in 2021 alone. The growth in the number of unicorn startups in Israel, together with tech startups maturing to become public companies rather being acquired earlier in their lifecycle, has led to the suggestion that Israel has transitioned from 'Startup Nation' to 'Scale-up Nation'.

In January 2026, the Israeli government launched a national artificial intelligence (AI) supercomputer initiative aimed at enhancing technological sovereignty and reducing reliance on foreign cloud providers such as AWS, Google Cloud, and Microsoft Azure. Managed by the Israel Innovation Authority and the Ministry of Innovation, Science and Technology, the program provides local high-tech firms, defense startups, and academic researchers with access to a high-performance computing cluster featuring 1,000 Nvidia B200 Blackwell accelerators. The project is a central component of a multi-year national AI plan, budgeted at approximately 1 billion NIS (about $315 million), designed to lower entry barriers for smaller companies and ensure domestic data sovereignty for sensitive defense and medical research.

== Education policy ==
Despite its reputation as a 'Start Up Nation', 25% of Israelis are technologically illiterate due to cultural and financial barriers. Around 375,000 children in Israel do not have access to a computer at home.

=== Sixth Higher Education Plan ===
Israel's higher education system is regulated by the Council for Higher Education and its Planning and Budgeting Committee. The Israeli higher education system operates under a multi-year plan agreed upon by the Planning and Budgeting Committee (PBC) and the Ministry of Finance. Each plan determines policy objectives and, accordingly, the budgets to be allocated in order to achieve these objectives.

The annual government allocation to universities totalled about US$1.75 billion in 2015, providing 50–75% of their operating budgets. Much of the remainder of their operating budget (15–20%) comes from annual student tuition fees, which are uniform at about US$2,750 per year. The Sixth Higher Education Plan (2011–2016) makes provision for a 30% rise in the Council for Higher Education's budget. The Sixth Plan changes the budgeting model of the PBC by placing greater emphasis on excellence in research, along with quantitative measures for the number of students. Under this model, 75% of the committee's budget (NIS 7 billion over six years) is being allocated to institutions offering higher education. The Sixth Higher Education Plan launched the Israeli Centres of Research Excellence (I-CORE) programme in October 2011. This reflects a renewed interest in funding academic research and constitutes a strong indication of a reversal in government policy.

=== Israeli Centres of Research Excellence ===
The Israeli Centres of Research Excellence (I-CORE) programme, which dates from 2011, envisions the establishment of cross-institutional clusters of top researchers in specific fields and returning young Israeli scientists from abroad, with each centre being endowed with state-of-the-art research infrastructure. The Sixth Higher Education Plan invests NIS 300 million over six years in upgrading and renovating academic infrastructure and research facilities.

I-CORE is run jointly by the Council for Higher Education's Planning and Budgeting Committee and the Israel Science Foundation. By 2015, 16 centres had been established in two waves across a wide spectrum of research areas: six specialize in life sciences and medicine, five in the exact sciences and engineering, three in social sciences and law and two in humanities. Each centre of excellence has been selected via a peer review process conducted by the Israel Science Foundation. By May 2014, around 60 young researchers had been absorbed into these centres, many of whom had previously worked abroad.

The research topics of each centre are selected through a broad bottom-up process consisting of consultations with the Israeli academic community, in order to ensure that they reflect the genuine priorities and scientific interests of Israeli researchers.

I-CORE is funded by the Council for Higher Education, the host institutions and strategic business partners, with a total budget of NIS 1.35 billion (US$365 million). The original goal was to set up 30 centres of research excellence in Israel by 2016. However, the establishment of the remaining 14 centres has provisionally been shelved, for lack of sufficient external capital.

In 2013–2014, the Planning and Budgeting Committee's budget for the entire I-CORE programme amounted to NIS 87.9 million, equivalent to about 1% of the total for higher education that year. This budget appears to be insufficient to create the critical mass of researchers in various academic fields and thus falls short of the programme's objective. The level of government support for the centres of excellence has grown each year since 2011 as new centres have been established and is expected to reach NIS 93.6 million by 2015–2016 before dropping to 33.7 million in 2017–2018. According to the funding model, government support should represent one-third of all funding, another third being funded by the participating universities and the remaining third by donors or investors.

=== University recruitment targets ===
In the 2012–2013 academic year, there were 4,066 faculty members. The targets fixed by the Planning and Budgeting Committee for faculty recruitment are ambitious: universities are to recruit another 1 600 senior faculty within the six-year period – about half of whom will occupy new positions and half will replace faculty expected to retire. This will constitute a net increase of more than 15% in university faculty. In colleges, another 400 new positions are to be created, entailing a 25% net increase. The new faculty will be hired via the institutions’ regular recruitment channels, some in specific research areas, through the Israeli Centers of Research Excellence program.

The increase in faculty numbers will also reduce the student-to-faculty ratio, the target being to achieve a ratio of 21.5 university students to every faculty member, compared to 24.3 at present, and 35 students for every faculty member in colleges, compared to 38 at present. This increase in the number of faculty positions, alongside the upgrading of research and teaching infrastructure and the increase in competitive research funds, should help Israel to staunch brain drain by enabling the best Israeli researchers at home and abroad to conduct their academic work in Israel, if they so wish, at institutions offering the highest academic standards.

The new budgeting scheme described above is mainly concerned with the human and research infrastructure in universities. Most of the physical development (e.g. buildings) and scientific infrastructure (e.g. laboratories and expensive equipment) of universities comes from philanthropic donations, primarily from the American Jewish community (CHE, 2014). This latter source of funding has greatly compensated for the lack of sufficient government funding for universities up until now but it is expected to diminish significantly in the years to come. Unless the government invests more in research infrastructure, Israel's universities will be ill-equipped and insufficiently funded to meet the challenges of the 21st century.

=== Expanding access to higher education ===
Israel has offered virtually universal access to its universities and academic colleges since the wave of Jewish immigration from the former Soviet Union in the 1990s prompted the establishment of numerous tertiary institutions to absorb the additional demand. However, the Arab and ultra-orthodox minorities still attend university in insufficient numbers. The Sixth Higher Education Plan places emphasis on encouraging minority groups to enroll in higher education. Two years after the Mahar program was implemented in late 2012 for the ultra-orthodox population, student enrollment had grown by 1400. Twelve new programs for ultra-orthodox students have since been established, three of them on university campuses. Meanwhile, the Pluralism and Equal Opportunity in Higher Education program addresses the barriers to integration of the Arab minority in the higher education system. Its scope ranges from providing secondary-school guidance through preparation for academic studies to offering students comprehensive support in their first year of study, a stage normally characterized by a high drop-out rate. The program renews the Ma’of fund supporting outstanding young Arab faculty members. Since the introduction of this program in 1995, the Ma’of fund has opened tenure track opportunities for nearly 100 Arab lecturers, who act as role models for younger Arab students embarking on their own academic careers.

== Science, technology and innovation policy ==
=== Policy framework ===
Although Israel does not have an ‘umbrella type’ policy for science, technology and innovation optimizing priorities and allocating resources, it does implement, de facto, an undeclared set of best practices combining bottom-up and top-down processes via government offices, such as those of the Chief Scientist or the Minister of Science, Technology and Space, as well as ad hoc organizations like the Telem forum. The procedure for selecting research projects for the Israeli centers for research excellence is one example of this bottom-up process.

Israel has no specific legislation regulating the transfer of knowledge from the academic sector to the general public and industry. Nevertheless, the Israeli government influences policy formulation by universities and technology transfer by providing incentives and subsidies through programmes such as Magnet and Magneton, as well as through regulation. There were attempts in 2004 and 2005 to introduce bills encouraging the transfer of knowledge and technology for the public benefit but, as these attempts failed, each university has since defined its own policy.

The Israeli economy is driven by industries based on electronics, computers and communication technologies, the result of over 50 years of investment in the country's defence infrastructure. Israeli defence industries have traditionally focused on electronics, avionics and related systems. The development of these systems has given Israeli high-tech industries a qualitative edge in civilian spin-offs in the software, communications and Internet sectors. However, the next waves of high technologies are expected to emanate from other disciplines, including molecular biology, biotechnology and pharmaceuticals, nanotechnology, material sciences and chemistry, in intimate synergy with information and communication technologies. These disciplines are rooted in the basic research laboratories of universities rather than the defence industries. This poses a dilemma. In the absence of a national policy for universities, let alone for the higher education system as a whole, it is not clear how these institutions will manage to supply the knowledge, skills and human resources needed for these new science-based industries.

=== Evaluation of science policy instruments ===
The country's various policy instruments are evaluated by the Council for Higher Education, the National Council for Research and Development, the Office of the Chief Scientist, the Academy of Sciences and Humanities and the Ministry of Finance. In recent years, the Magnet administration in the Office of the Chief Scientist has initiated several evaluations of its own policy instruments, most of which have been carried out by independent research institutions. One such evaluation was carried out in 2010 by the Samuel Neaman Institute; it concerned the Nofar programme within the Magnet directorate. Nofar tries to bridge basic and applied research, before the commercial potential of a project has caught the eye of industry. The main recommendation was for Nofar to extend programme funding to emerging technological domains beyond biotechnology and nanotechnology. The Office of the Chief Scientist accepted this recommendation and, consequently, decided to fund projects in the fields of medical devices, water and energy technology and multidisciplinary research.

An additional evaluation was carried out in 2008 by Applied Economics, an economic and management research-based consultancy, on the contribution of the high-tech sector to economic productivity in Israel. It found that the output per worker in companies that received support from the Office of the Chief Scientist was 19% higher than in ‘twin’ companies that had not received this support. The same year, a committee headed by Israel Makov examined the Office of the Chief Scientist's support for research and development in large companies. The committee found economic justification for providing incentives for these companies.

=== Research funding programmes ===
The Israeli Science Foundation is the main source of research funding in Israel and receives administrative support from the Academy of Sciences and Humanities. The foundation provides competitive grants in three areas: exact sciences and technology; life sciences and medicine; and humanities and social sciences. Complementary funding is provided by binational foundations, such as the USA–Israel Binational Science Foundation (est. 1972) and the German–Israeli Foundation for Scientific Research and Development (est. 1986).

The Ministry of Science, Technology and Space funds thematic research centres and is responsible for international scientific co-operation. The Ministry's National Infrastructure Programme aims to create a critical mass of knowledge in national priority fields and to nurture the younger generation of scientists. Investment in the programme mainly takes the form of research grants, scholarships and knowledge centres. Over 80% of the ministry's budget is channelled towards research in academic institutions and research institutes, as well as towards revamping scientific infrastructure by upgrading existing research facilities and establishing new ones. In 2012, the ministry resolved to invest NIS 120 million over three years in four designated priority areas for research: brain science; supercomputing and cybersecurity; oceanography; and alternative transportation fuels. An expert panel headed by the Chief Scientist in the Ministry of Science, Technology and Space chose these four broad disciplines in the belief that they would be likely to exert the greatest practical impact on Israeli life in the near future.

The main ongoing programmes managed by the Israel Innovation Authority, previously known as the Office of the Chief Scientist within the Ministry of the Economy are: the R&D (Research and Development) Fund; Magnet Tracks (est. 1994); Tnufa (est. 2001) and the Technological Incubator Programme (est.1991). Between 2010 and 2014, the Office of the Chief Scientist initiated several new programmes:

- Grand Challenges Israel (since 2014): an Israeli contribution to the Grand Challenges in Global Health programme, which is dedicated to tackling global health and food security challenges in developing countries; Grand Challenges Israel is offering grants of up to NIS 500 000 at the proof of concept/feasibility study stage.
- Research and development in the field of space technology (2012): encourages research to find technological solutions in various fields.
- Technological Entrepreneurship Incubators (2014): encourages entrepreneurial technology and supports start-up technology companies.
- Magnet – Kamin programme (2014) provides direct support for applied research in academia that has potential for commercial application.
- Cyber – Kidma programme (2014): promotes Israel's cybersecurity industry.
- Cleantech – Renewable Energy Technology Centre (2012): supports research through projects involving private–public partnerships in the field of renewable energy.
- Life Sciences Fund (2010): finances the projects of Israeli companies, with emphasis on biopharmaceuticals, established together with the Ministry of Finance and the private sector.
- Biotechnology – Tzatam programme (2011): provides equipment to support research and development in life sciences. The Chief Scientist supports industrial organizations and the PBC provides research institutions with assistance.
- Investment in high-tech industries (2011): encourages financial institutions to invest in knowledge-based industries, through a collaboration between the Office of the Chief Scientist and the Ministry of Finance.

Another source of public research funding is the Forum for National Research and Development Infrastructure (Telem). This voluntary partnership involves the Office of the Chief Scientist of the Ministry of the Economy and the Ministry of Science, Technology and Space, the Planning and Budgeting Committee and the Ministry of Finance. Telem projects focus on establishing infrastructure for research and development in areas that are of common interest to most Telem partners. These projects are financed by the Telem members’ own resources.

=== Trends in research funding ===
In 2014, Israel topped the world for research intensity, reflecting the importance of research and innovation for the economy. Since 2008, however, Israel's research intensity has weakened somewhat (4.21% of GDP in 2013), even as this ratio has experienced impressive growth in the Republic of Korea (4.15% in 2014), Denmark (3.06% in 2013) and Germany (2.94% in 2013). The OECD average was 2.40% of GDP in 2014. Business expenditure on research and development (BERD) continues to account for ~84% of GERD, or 3.49% of GDP.

The share of higher education in gross domestic expenditure on research and development (GERD) has decreased since 2003 from 0.69% of GDP to 0.59% of GDP (2013). Despite this drop, Israel ranks 8th among OECD countries for this indicator. The lion's share of GERD (45.6%) in Israel is financed by foreign companies, reflecting the large scale of activity by foreign multinational companies and research centres in the country.

The share of foreign funding in university-performed research is also quite significant (21.8%). By the end of 2014, Israel had received €875.6 million from the European Union's (EU's) Seventh Framework Programme for Research and Innovation (2007–2013), 70% of which had gone to universities. Its successor, Horizon 2020 (2014–2020), has been endowed with nearly €80 billion in funding, making it the EU's most ambitious research and innovation programme ever. As of February 2015, Israel had received €119.8 million from the Horizon 2020 programme.

In 2013, more than half (51.5%) of government spending was allocated to university research and an additional 29.9% to the development of industrial technologies. Research expenditure on health and the environment has doubled in absolute terms in the past decade but still accounts for less than 1% of total government GERD. Israel is unique among OECD countries in its distribution of government support by objective. Israel ranks at the bottom in government support of research in health care, environmental quality and infrastructure development.

There has been insufficient government funding for universities in recent years. University research in Israel is largely grounded in basic research, even though it also engages in applied research and partnerships with industry. Basic research in Israel only accounted for 13% of research expenditure in 2013, compared to 16% in 2006. There has since been an increase in General University Funds and those destined for non-oriented research.

=== Trends in human resources ===
In 2012, there were 77 282 full-time equivalent researchers in Israel, 82% of whom had acquired an academic education, 10% of whom were practical engineers and technicians and 8% of whom held other qualifications. Eight out of ten (83.8%) were employed in the business sector, 1.1% in the government sector, 14.4% in the higher education sector and 0.7% in non-profit institutions.

In 2011, 28% of senior academic staff were women, up by 5% over the previous decade (from 25% in 2005). Although the representation of women has increased, it remains very low in engineering (14%), physical sciences (11%), mathematics and computer sciences (10%) relative to education (52%) and paramedical occupations (63%).

There is a visible ageing of scientists and engineers in some fields. For instance, about three-quarters of researchers in the physical sciences are over the age of 50 and the proportion is even higher for practical engineers and technicians. The shortage of professional staff will be a major handicap for the national innovation system in the coming years, as the growing demand for engineers and technical professionals begins to outpace supply.

During the 2012/2013 academic year, 34% of bachelor's degrees were obtained in fields related to science and engineering in Israel. This compares well with the proportion in the Republic of Korea (40%) and most Western countries (about 30% on average). The proportion of Israeli graduates in scientific disciplines and engineering was slightly lower at the master's level (27%) but dominated at PhD level (56%).

Recent statistics support the assertion that Israel may be living on the ‘fruits of the past’, that is to say, on the heavy investment made in primary, secondary and tertiary education during the 1950s, 1960s and 1970s. Between 2007 and 2013, the number of graduates in physical sciences, biological sciences and agriculture dropped, even though the total number of university graduates progressed by 19% (to 39 654). Recent data reveal that Israeli educational achievements in the core curricular subjects of mathematics and science are low in comparison to other OECD countries, as revealed by the exam results of Israeli 15-year-olds in the OECD's Programme for International Student Assessment. Public spending on primary education has also fallen below the OECD average. The public education budget accounted for 6.9% of GDP in 2002 but only 5.6% in 2011. The share of this budget going to tertiary education has remained stable at 16–18% but, as a share of GDP, has passed under the bar of 1%. There is concern at the deteriorating quality of teachers at all levels of education and the lack of stringent demands on students to strive for excellence.

In recent years, Israel encountered the problem of shortage of specialists in the high-tech industry. Now high technology sector is rapidly growing and demand for tech talent increasing as well - the further growth of the industry depends on it. The shortage also generates a significant and disproportionate increase in salaries, which causes companies to look for new employees abroad. To solve the problem Israel's Council for Higher Education has already launched a five-years program to increase the number of graduates from computer science and engineering programs by 40%.

== Digital technologies ==
Israel is investing heavily in technologies such as AI and data science, smart mobility, digital health and e-governance through Digital Israel, a series of national programmes that include the Fuel Choices and Smart Mobility Initiative.

Digital Israel is the concrete expression of the government's Digital Policy for 2017–2022. This NIS 1.5 billion (about US$425 million) initiative aims to make Israel a global leader in this domain. The programme plans to leverage Israeli expertise in information and communication technologies (ICTs) to accelerate economic growth, reduce socio-economic disparities and make governance smarter, faster and citizen-friendlier.

The programme is led by the Headquarters for the National Digital Israel Initiative, placed under the Ministry of Social Equality; this body collaborates with ministries, local authorities, companies and non-profit organizations.

In 2018, Israel embarked on a five-year National Programme for Digital Health. The stated aims are to create a new national economic growth engine, advance Israel's clinical and academic research and create a local digital health care system that is among the best in the world. The programme is backed by an investment of NIS 898 million (ca US$256 million) and implemented by multiple governmental bodies, including the Ministry of Health, the Ministry for Social Equality (Digital Israel), the Ministry of the Economy and Industry, the Israeli Innovation Authority and the Council for Higher Education.

== Research universities ==
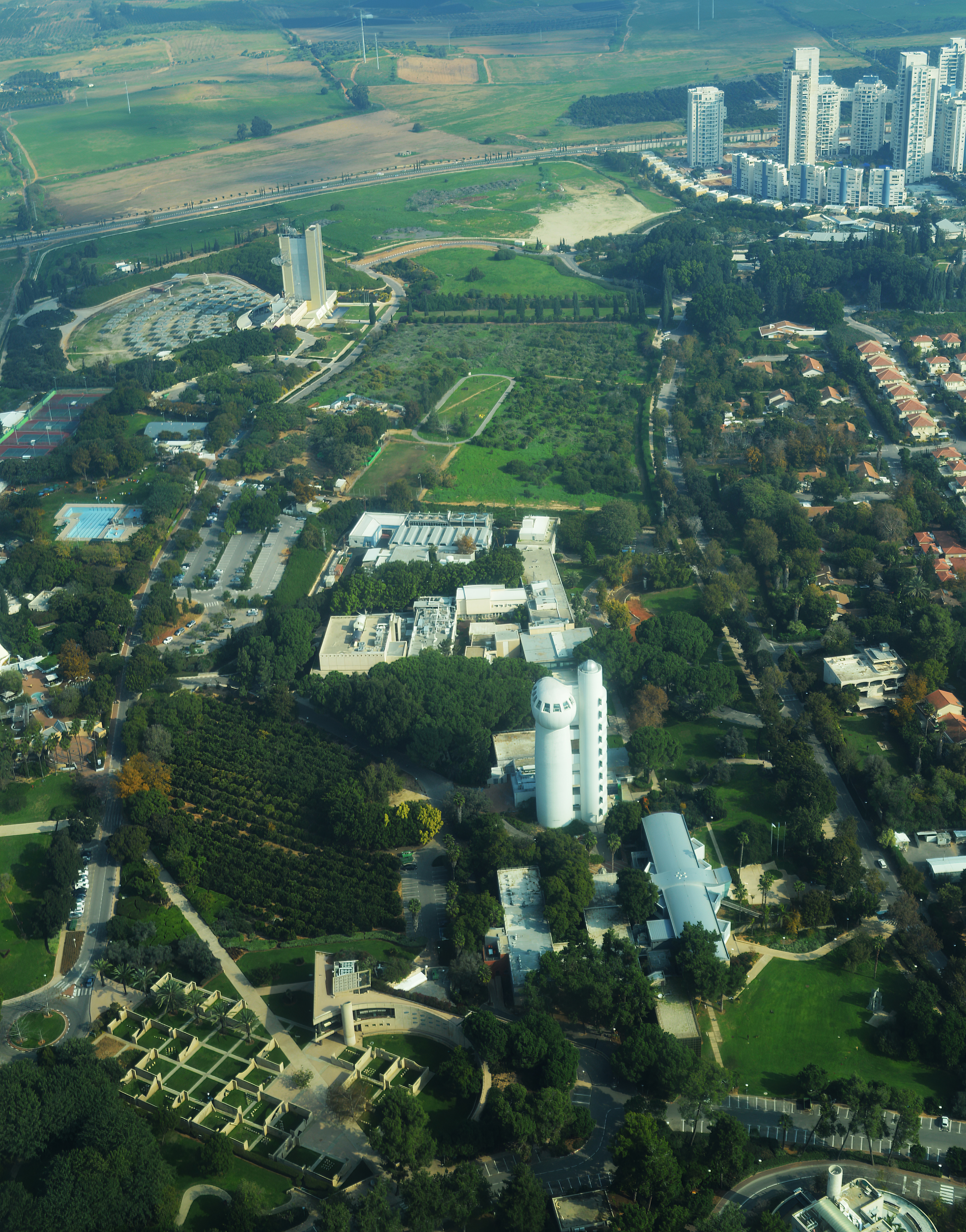
The Weizmann Institute of Science in Rehovot

Israel has nine research universities: Bar-Ilan University, Ben-Gurion University of the Negev, the University of Haifa, Hebrew University of Jerusalem, the Technion – Israel Institute of Technology, Tel Aviv University, Open University of Israel, Reichman University and the Weizmann Institute of Science, Rehovot.

Other scientific research institutions include the Volcani Institute of Agricultural Research in Beit Dagan, the Israel Institute for Biological Research and the Soreq Nuclear Research Center. The Ben-Gurion National Solar Energy Center at Sde Boker is an alternative energy research institute established in 1987 by the Ministry of National Infrastructures to study alternative and clean energy technologies.

Israeli universities are ranked among the top 50 academic institutions in the world in the following scientific disciplines: in chemistry (Technion); in computer science (Weizmann Institute of Science, Technion, Hebrew University, Tel Aviv University); in mathematics and natural sciences (Hebrew University, Technion) and in engineering (Technion).

In 2009, Mor Tzaban, an Israeli high school student from Netivot, won first prize in the First Step to Nobel Prize in Physics competition. In 2012, Yuval Katzenelson of Kiryat Gat won first prize with a paper entitled "Kinetic energy of inert gas in a regenerative system of activated carbon." The Israeli delegation won 14 more prizes in the competition: nine Israelis students won second prize, one won third prize and one won fourth prize.

== Research and development center ==
Except universities, Israel has seven R&D centers in the periphery. These centers were established by the Ministry of Science and Technology, and include Migal and the Dead Sea and Arava science center. Their orientation is based on applied science and the dissemination of scientific knowledge to the general population. To date, seven centers are working with significant academic impact and relevance to the region.

== Scientific output ==
The number of Israeli publications stagnated between 2005 and 2014, according to Thomson Reuters' Web of Science (Science Citation Index Expanded). Consequently, the number of Israeli publications per million inhabitants also declined: between 2008 and 2013, it dropped from 1 488 to 1 431; this trend reflects a relative constancy in scholarly output in the face of relatively high population growth (1.1% in 2014) for a developed country and near-zero growth in the number of full-time equivalent researchers in universities. Between 2005 and 2014, Israeli scientific output was particularly high in life sciences. Israeli universities do particularly well in computer science but publications in this field tend to appear mostly in conference proceedings, which are not included in the Web of Science.

Israeli publications have a high citation rate and a high share of papers count among the 10 percent most-cited. The share of papers with foreign co-authors is almost twice the OECD average, which is typical of small countries with a developed scientific and technological ecosystem. A team of 50 Israeli scientists work full-time at CERN, the European Organization for Nuclear Research, which operates the Large Hadron Collider in Switzerland. Israel was granted observer status in 1991 before becoming a fully fledged member in 2014. An Israeli delegation headed by President Shimon Peres visited the particle accelerator in 2011.

Israeli scientists collaborate mostly with Western countries such as the European Union and the United States but there has been strong growth in recent years in collaboration with East Asian countries such as China, Japan, and South Korea, India, and the Southeast Asian city state of Singapore.

== Technology transfer ==
=== History ===
Research conducted at Israeli universities and institutes is shared with the private sector through technology transfer (TT) units. Israel's first university TT unit, Yeda, was established by the Weizmann Institute of Science in the 1950s. Research in such fields as arid and semi-arid zone agricultural engineering was transferred to kibbutzim and private farmers on a gratis basis and agricultural knowledge was shared with developing countries.

In 1964, Yissum, the technology transfer company of the Hebrew University of Jerusalem, was founded.

Since the 1990s, the traditional dual mission of universities of teaching and research has broadened to include a third mission: engagement with society and industry. This evolution has been a corollary of the rise of the electronics industry and information technology services, along with a surge in the number of research personnel following the wave of immigration from the former Soviet Union.

Israel has no specific legislation regulating the transfer of knowledge from the academic sector to the general public and industry. There were attempts in 2004 and 2005 to introduce bills encouraging the transfer of knowledge and technology for the public benefit but, as these attempts failed, each university has since defined its own policy.

=== University-industry collaboration ===
All Israeli research universities have technology transfer offices. Recent research conducted by the Samuel Neaman Institute has revealed that, between 2004 and 2013, the universities’ share of patent applications constituted 10–12% of the total inventive activity of Israeli applicants. This is one of the highest shares in the world and is largely due to the intensive activity of the universities’ technology transfer offices. The Weizmann Institute's technology transfer office, Yeda, has been ranked the third-most profitable in the world. Through exemplary university–industry collaboration, the Weizmann Institute of Science and Teva Pharmaceutical Industries have discovered and developed the Copaxone drug for the treatment of multiple sclerosis. Copaxone is Teva's biggest-selling drug, with US$1.68 billion in sales in the first half of 2011. Since the drug's approval by the US Food and Drug Administration in 1996, it is estimated that the Weizmann Institute of Science has earned nearly US$2 billion in royalties from the commercialization of its intellectual property.

=== International technology transfer ===
In 2007, the United Nations General Assembly's Economic and Financial Committee adopted an Israeli-sponsored draft resolution on agricultural technology transfer to developing countries. The resolution called on developed countries to make their knowledge and know-how accessible to the developing world as part of the UN campaign to eradicate hunger and dire poverty by 2015. The initiative is an outgrowth of Israel's many years of contributing its know-how to developing nations, especially Africa, in the spheres of agriculture, fighting desertification, rural development, irrigation, medical development, computers and the empowerment of women.

== Venture capital ==
As new technology companies require money and seed capital to grow and thrive, Israel's science and technology sector is backed by a strong venture capital industry. Between 2004 and 2013, the Israeli venture capital industry played a fundamental role in funding the development of Israel's high-tech sector. In 2013, Israeli companies had raised more venture capital as a share of GDP than companies in any other country as it attracted US$2 346 million alone during that year. Today, Israel is considered one of the biggest venture capital centers in the world outside the United States of America. Several factors have contributed to this growth. These include tax exemptions on Israeli venture capital, funds established in conjunction with large international banks and financial companies and the involvement of major organizations desirous to capitalize on the strengths of Israeli high-tech companies. These organizations include some of the world's largest multinational technology companies, including Apple, Cisco, Google, IBM, Intel, Microsoft, Oracle, Siemens and Samsung. In recent years, the share of venture capital invested in the growth stages of enterprises has flourished at the expense of early stage investments. Nowadays, Israeli companies are considered to be more popular than their American peers. For comparison, investments volume in Israeli startups grew by 140% during 2014-2018 and investments in technological startups from the U.S. grew by 64%.

Israel's venture capital market backed deals worth US$4 759 million in 2018. About half of venture capital-backed deals involved an Israeli venture capitalist, either working solo or with others. According to the IVC database, 480 Israeli venture capital companies invested in Israeli high-tech firms in 2018 and 2019.

For most OECD countries, venture capital constitutes less than 0.05% of GDP. Israel and the USA are the exception; their venture capital industry accounts for more than 0.35% of GDP.

== Intellectual property rights ==
Intellectual property rights in Israel protect copyright and performers’ rights, trademarks, geographical indicators, patents, industrial designs, topographies of integrated circuits, plant breeds and undisclosed business secrets. Both contemporary Israeli legislation and case law are influenced by laws and practices in modern countries, particularly Anglo-American law, the emerging body of EU law and proposals by international organizations.

Israel has made a concerted effort to improve the economy's ability to benefit from an enhanced system of intellectual property rights. This includes increasing the resources of the Israel Patent Office, upgrading enforcement activities and implementing programmes to bring ideas funded by government research to the market. Between 2002 and 2012, foreigners accounted for nearly 80% of the patent applications filed with the Israel Patent Office. A sizeable share of foreign applicants seeking protection from the Israel Patent Office are pharmaceutical companies such as F. Hoffmann-La Roche, Janssen, Novartis, Merck, Bayer-Schering, Sanofi-Aventis and Pfizer, which happen to be the main business competitors of Israel's own Teva Pharmaceutical Industries.

Israel ranks tenth in the world for the number of patent applications filed with the United States Patent and Trademark Office (USPTO) by country of residence of the first-named inventor. Israeli inventors file far more applications with USPTO (5 436 in 2011) than with the European Patent Office (EPO). Moreover, the number of Israeli filings with EPO dropped from 1400 to 1063 between 2006 and 2011. This preference for USPTO is largely because foreign research centres implanted in Israel are primarily owned by US firms such as IBM, Intel, Sandisk, Microsoft, Applied Materials, Qualcomm, Motorola, Google, or Hewlett-Packard. The inventions of these companies are attributed to Israel as the inventor of the patent but not as the owner (applicant or assignee). The loss of intellectual property into the hands of multinationals occurs mainly through the recruitment of the best Israeli talent by the local research centres of multinational firms. Although the Israeli economy benefits from the activity of the multinationals’ subsidiaries through job creation and other means, the advantages are relatively small compared to the potential economic gains that might have been achieved, had this intellectual property been utilized to support and foster the expansion of mature Israeli companies of a considerable size.

== Applied science and engineering ==
=== Energy ===
==== Solar power ====
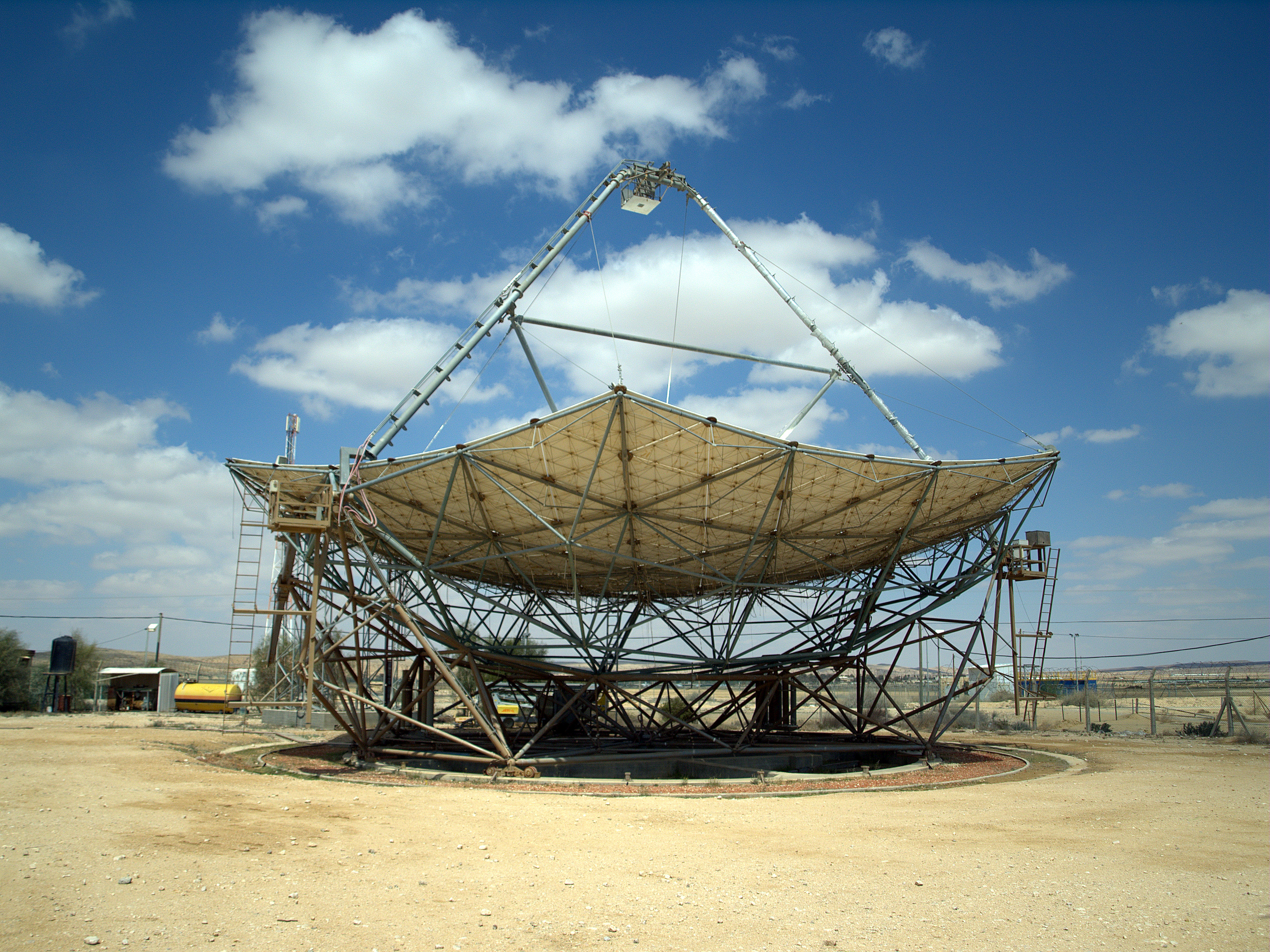
The world's largest solar parabolic dish at the Ben-Gurion National Solar Energy Center

The country's lack of conventional energy sources has spurred extensive research and development of alternative energy sources and Israel has developed innovative technologies in the solar energy field. Israel has become the world's largest per capita user of solar water heaters in the home. A new, high-efficiency receiver to collect concentrated sunlight has been developed, which will enhance the use of solar energy in industry as well.

In a 2009 report by the CleanTech Group, Israel ranked number 5 clean tech country in the world. The Arrow Ecology company has developed the ArrowBio process a patented system which takes trash directly from collection trucks and separates organic and inorganic materials through gravitational settling, screening, and hydro-mechanical shredding. The system is capable of sorting huge volumes of solid waste, salvaging recyclables, and turning the rest into biogas and rich agricultural compost. The system is used in California, Australia, Greece, Mexico, the United Kingdom and in Israel. For example, an ArrowBio plant that has been operational at the Hiriya landfill site since December 2003 serves the Tel Aviv area, and processes up to 150 tons of garbage a day.

In 2010, Technion – the Israel Institute of Technology – established the Grand Technion Energy Program (GTEP). This multidisciplinary task-force brings together Technion's top researchers in energy science and technology from over nine different faculties. GTEP's 4-point strategy targets research and development of alternative fuels; renewable energy sources; energy storage and conversion; and energy conservation. GTEP is presently the only center in Israel offering graduate studies in energy science and technology to bring the energy skills and know-how to address the energy challenges of the future.

==== Natural gas ====
Since 1999, large reserves of natural gas have been discovered off Israel's coast. This fossil fuel has become the primary fuel for electricity generation in Israel and is gradually replacing oil and coal. In 2010, 37% of electricity in Israel was generated from natural gas, leading to savings of US$1.4 billion for the economy. In 2015, this rate is expected to surpass 55%.

In addition, the usage of natural gas in industry – both as a source of energy and as a raw material – is rapidly expanding, alongside the requisite infrastructure. This is giving companies a competitive advantage by reducing their energy costs and lowering national emissions. Since early 2013, almost the entire natural gas consumption of Israel has been supplied by the Tamar field, an Israeli–American private partnership. The estimated reserves amount to about 1 000 BCM, securing Israel's energy needs for many decades to come and making Israel a potentially major regional exporter of natural gas. In 2014, initial export agreements were signed with the Palestinian Authority, Jordan and Egypt; there are also plans to export natural gas to Turkey and the EU via Greece.

In 2011, the government asked the Academy of Sciences and Humanities to convene a panel of experts to consider the full range of implications of the most recent discoveries of natural gas. The panel recommended encouraging research into fossil fuels, training engineers and focusing research efforts on the impact of gas production on the Mediterranean Sea's ecosystem. The Mediterranean Sea Research Centre of Israel was established in 2012 with an initial budget of NIS 70 million; new study programmes have since been launched at the centre to train engineers and other professionals for the oil and gas industry. Meanwhile, the Office of the Chief Scientist, among others, plans to use Israel's fledgling natural gas industry as a stepping stone to building capacity in advanced technology and opening up opportunities for Israeli innovation targeting the global oil and gas markets.

=== Space science and technology ===
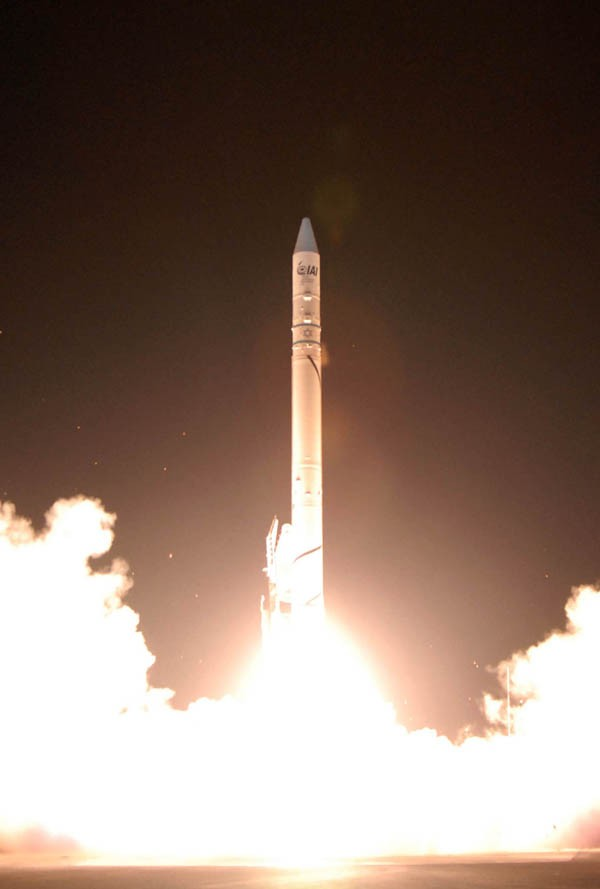
Ofek-7 satellite launch through Shavit vehicle

During the 1970s and 1980s, Israel began developing the infrastructure needed for research and development in space exploration and related sciences. In November 1982, the Minister of Science and Technology, Yuval Ne'eman, established the Israel Space Agency (ISA), to coordinate and supervise a national space program as well as to conduct space, planetary, and aviation research. Because of geographical constraints, as well as safety considerations, the Israeli space program focuses on very small satellites loaded with payloads of a high degree of sophistication, and cooperation with other national space agencies. The Technion Asher Space Research Institute plays a central role in educating the aerospace engineers of the next generation. In 2009 Israel was ranked 2nd among 20 top countries in space sciences by Thomson Reuters agency.

Israel became the eighth nation in the world to have an orbital launch capability when it deployed its first satellite, Ofeq-1, using the locally built Shavit launch vehicle on September 19, 1988, and has made contributions in a number of areas in space research, including laser communication, research into embryo development and osteoporosis in space, pollution monitoring, and mapping geology, soil and vegetation in semi-arid environments.

Key projects include the TAUVEX telescope, the Tel Aviv University Ultra Violet Experiment, a UV telescope for astronomical observations which was developed in the 1990s to be accommodated on an Indian Space Research Organisation (ISRO) geo-synchronous satellite GSAT-4, for joint operation and use by Indian and Israeli scientists; the VENUS microsatellite, developed in collaboration with the French space agency, CNES, which will use an Israeli-developed space camera, electric space engine and algorithms; and MEIDEX (Mediterranean – Israel Dust Experiment), in collaboration with NASA.

Ilan Ramon was Israel's first astronaut. Ramon was the Space Shuttle payload specialist on board the fatal STS-107 mission of Space Shuttle Columbia, in which he and the six other crew members were killed in a re-entry accident over the southern United States. Ramon had been selected as a payload specialist in 1997 and trained at the Johnson Space Center, Houston, Texas, from 1998 until 2003. Among other experiments, Ramon was responsible for the MEIDEX project in which he was required to take pictures of atmospheric aerosol (dust) in the Mediterranean area using a multispectral camera designed to provide scientific information about atmospheric aerosols and the influence of global changes on the climate, and data for the Total Ozone Mapping Spectrometer (TOMS) and Moderate-Resolution Imaging Spectroradiometer (MODIS) instruments. Researchers from Tel Aviv University (TAU) were responsible for the scientific aspect of the experiment. The TAU team also worked with a US company, Orbital Sciences Corporation, to construct and test special flight instruments for the project.

=== Aerospace engineering ===
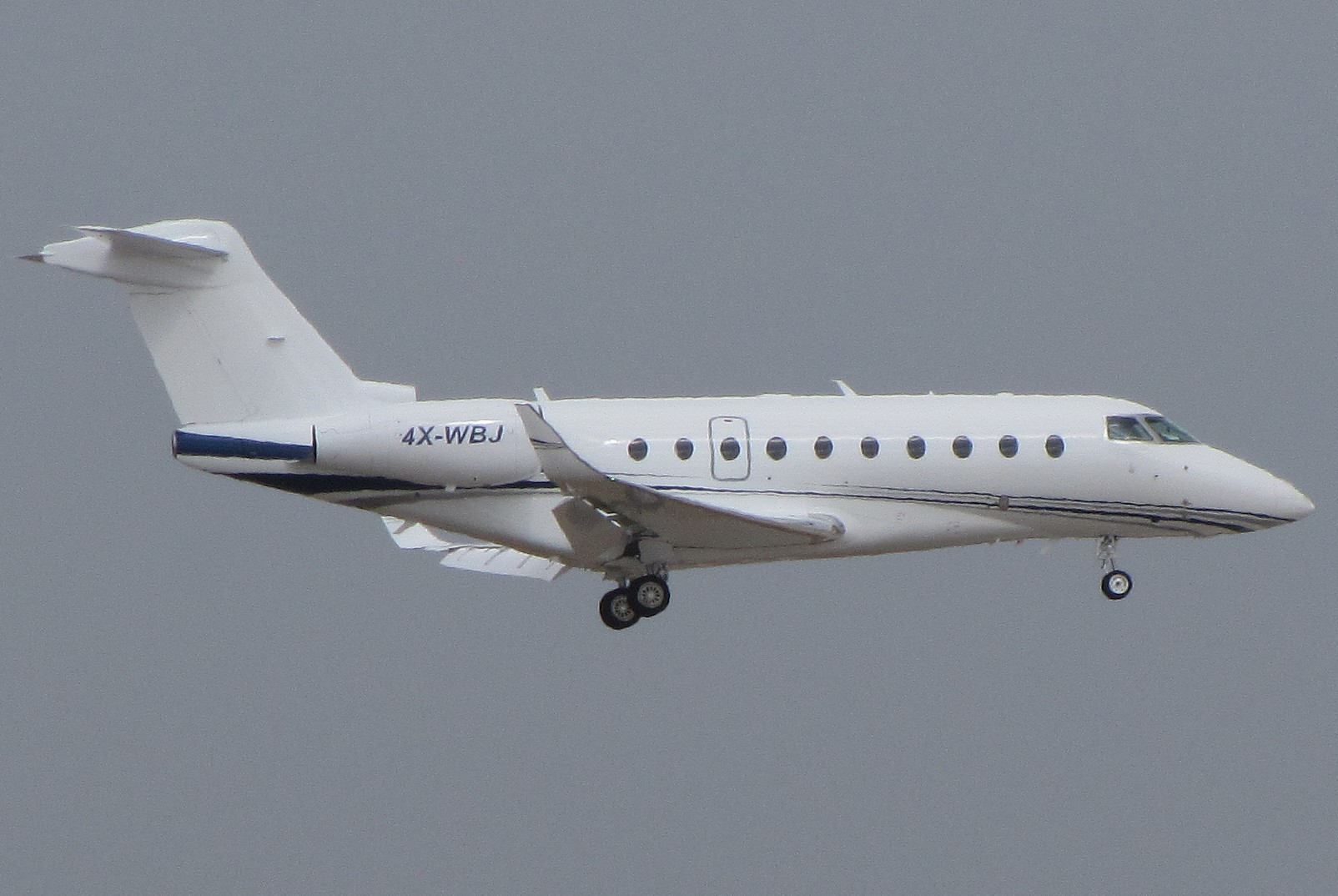
Gulfstream G280 transcontinental business jet was designed and is currently produced for Gulfstream Aerospace by Israel Aircraft Industries (IAI).

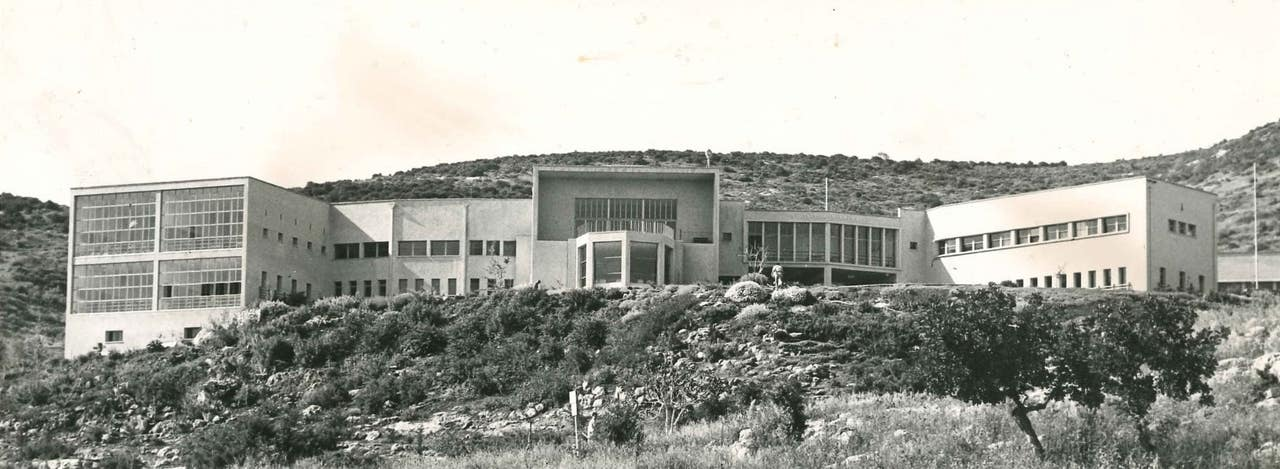
Aerospace faculty, Technion, 1956

Aerospace engineering related to the country's defense needs has generated technological development with consequent civilian spin-offs. The Arava short take-off and landing (STOL) plane manufactured by Israel Aerospace Industries was the first aircraft to be produced in Israel, in the late 1960s, for both military and civilian uses. This was followed by the production of the Westwind business jet from 1965 to 1987, and later variants, the Astra and the Gulfstream G100, which are still in active service.

Israel is among the few countries capable of launching satellites into orbit and locally designed and manufactured satellites have been produced and launched by Israel Aerospace Industries (IAI), Israel's largest military engineering company, in cooperation with the Israel Space Agency. The AMOS-1 geostationary satellite began operations in 1996 as Israel's first commercial communications satellite. It was built primarily for direct-to-home television broadcasting, TV distribution and VSAT services. AMOS-2 was launched in December 2003 and a further series of AMOS communications satellites (AMOS 2 – 5i) are operated or in development by the Spacecom Satellite Communications company, headquartered in Ramat-Gan, Israel. Spacecom provides satellite telecommunications services to countries in Europe, the Middle East and Africa. Another satellite, the Gurwin-II TechSAT, designed and manufactured by the Technion, was launched in July 1998 to provide communications, remote sensing and research services. EROS, launched in 2000, is a non-geostationary orbit satellite for commercial photography and surveillance services.

Israel also develops, manufactures, and exports a large number of related aerospace products, including rockets and satellites, display systems, aeronautical computers, instrumentation systems, drones and flight simulators. Israel's second largest defense company is Elbit Systems, which makes electro-optical systems for air, sea and ground forces; drones; control and monitoring systems; communications systems and more. The Technion - Israel Institute of Technology is home to the Asher Space Research Institute, which is unique in Israel as a university-based center of space research. At ASRI, Israeli students designed, built and launched their own satellite: Gurwin TechSat.

=== Agricultural engineering ===
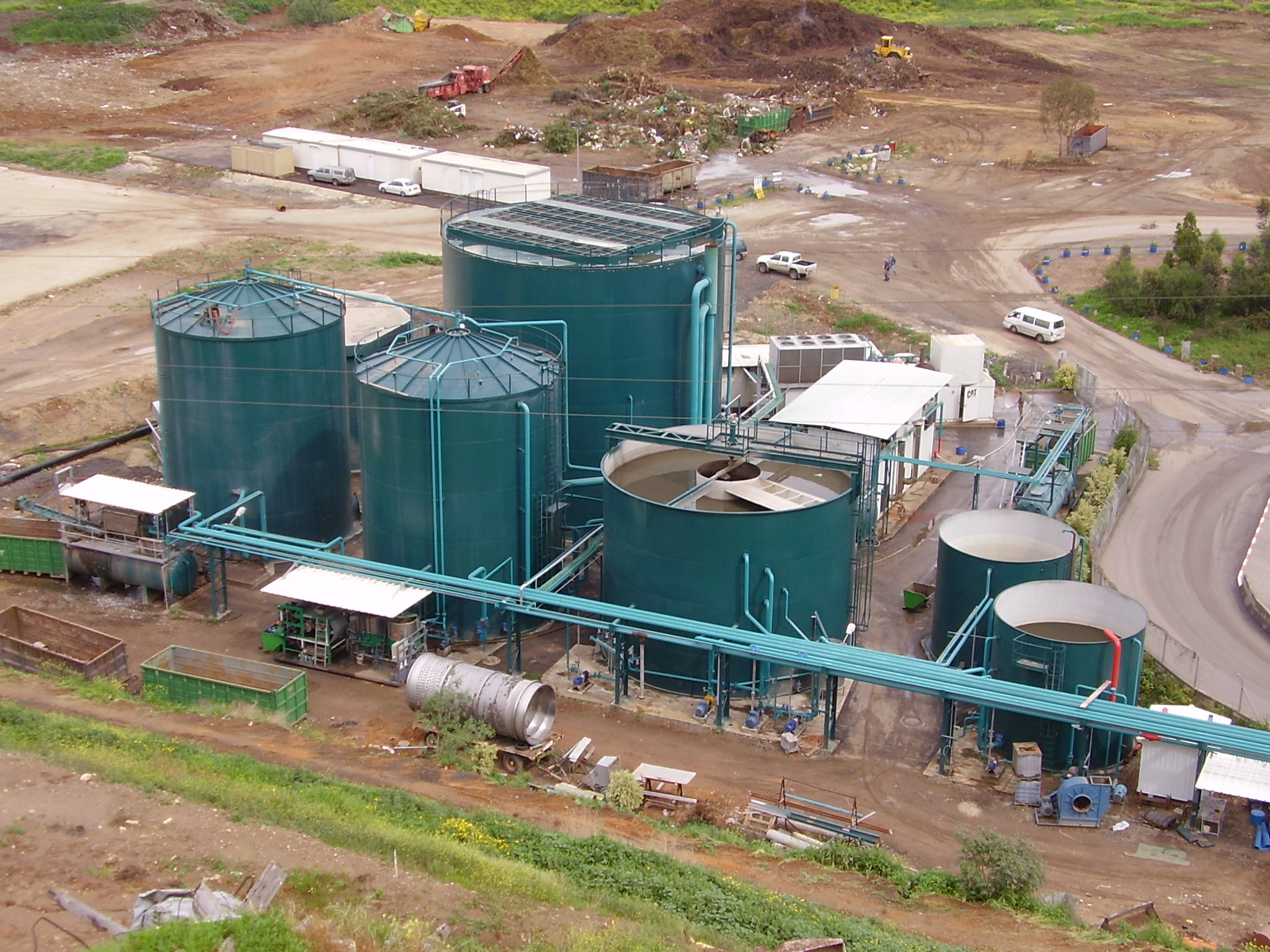
Anaerobic digesters at Hiriya waste facility

Israel's agricultural sector is characterized by an intensive system of production stemming from the need to overcome the scarcity in natural resource, particularly water and arable land, in a country where more than half of its area is desert. The growth in agricultural production is based on close cooperation of scientists, farmers and agriculture-related industries and has resulted in the development of advanced agricultural technology, water-conserving irrigation methods, anaerobic digestion, greenhouse technology, desert agriculture and salinity research. Israeli companies also supply irrigation, water conservation and greenhouse technologies and know-how to other countries.

The modern technology of drip irrigation was invented in Israel by Simcha Blass and his son Yeshayahu. Instead of releasing water through tiny holes, blocked easily by tiny particles, water was released through larger and longer passageways by using velocity to slow water inside a plastic emitter. The first experimental system of this type was established in 1959 when Blass partnered with Kibbutz Hatzerim to create an irrigation company called Netafim. Together they developed and patented the first practical surface drip irrigation emitter. This method was very successful and had spread to Australia, North America and South America by the late 1960s.

Israeli farmers rely heavily on greenhouse technology to ensure a constant, year-round supply of high quality produce, while overcoming the obstacles posed by adverse climatic conditions, and water and land shortages. Technologies include computerized greenhouse climate control, greenhouse shading, irrigation, fertigation, greenhouse water recycling and biological control of plant disease and insects, allow farmers to control most production parameters. As a result, Israeli farmers successfully grow 3 million roses per hectare in season and an average of 300 tons of tomatoes per hectare, four times the amount harvested in open fields.

=== Computer engineering ===
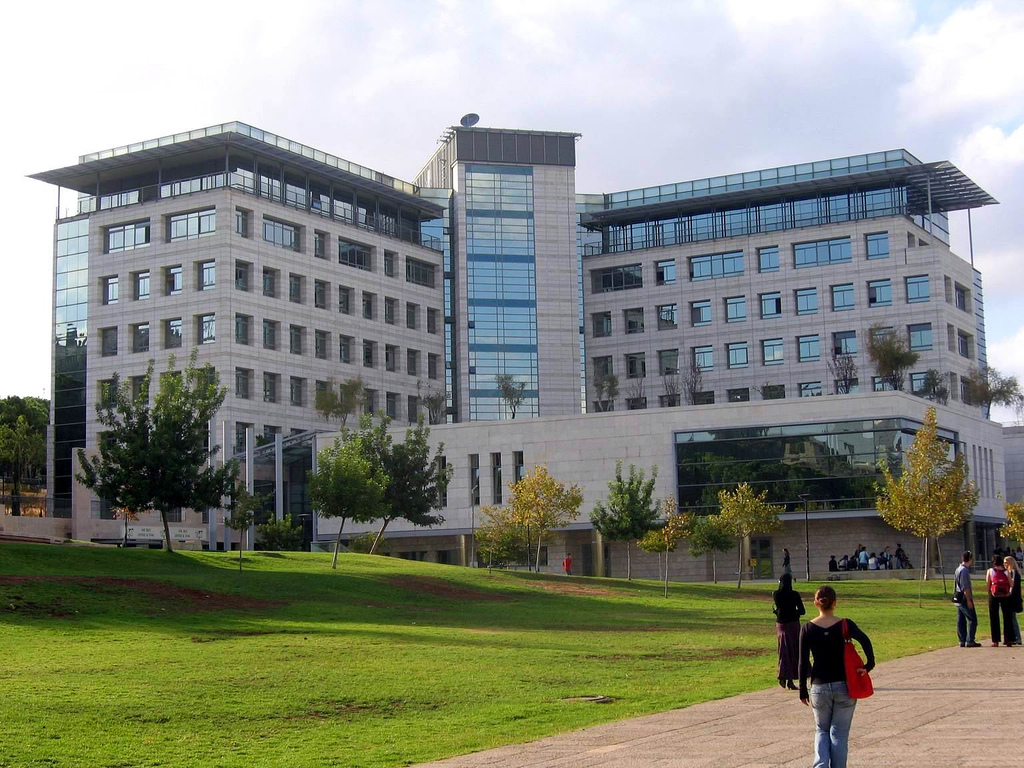
The faculty of computer science of the Technion - Israel Institute of Technology

Israeli companies excel in computer software and hardware development, particularly computer security technologies, semiconductors and communications. Israeli firms include Check Point, the creators of the first commercial firewall; Amdocs, which makes business and operations support systems for telecoms; Comverse, a voice-mail company; and Mercury Interactive, which measures software performance. A high concentration of high-tech industries in the coastal plain of Israel has led to the nickname Silicon Wadi (lit: "Silicon Valley"). Both Israeli and international companies are based there. Intel, Microsoft, and Apple built their first overseas research and development centers in Israel, and other high-tech multi-national corporations, such as IBM, Cisco Systems, and Motorola, have opened facilities in the country. Intel developed its dual-core Core Duo processor at its Israel Development Center in Haifa. More than 3,850 start-ups have been established in Israel, making it second only to the US in this sector and has the largest number of NASDAQ-listed companies outside North America.

Optics, electro-optics, and lasers are significant fields and Israel produces fiber-optics, electro-optic inspection systems for printed circuit boards, thermal imaging night-vision systems, and electro-optics-based robotic manufacturing systems. Research into robotics first began in the late 1970s, has resulted in the production of robots designed to perform a wide variety of computer aided manufacturing tasks, including diamond polishing, welding, packing, and building. Research is also conducted in the application of artificial intelligence for a variety of needs, from robots to foundation models for video creation.

Israel's Weizmann Institute of Science and Technion – Israel Institute of Technology are ranked among the top 20 academic institutions in the world in computer science. An Israeli electronics engineer and businessman who was the founder, chief executive officer, and president of M-Systems, Dov Moran, invented the first flash drive in 1998.

==== Cybersecurity ====
In November 2010, the Israeli prime minister Benjamin Netanyahu entrusted a task force with responsibility for formulating national plans to place Israel among the top five countries in the world for cybersecurity. On 7 August 2011, the government approved the establishment of the National Cyber Bureau to promote the Israeli cyberdefence industry. The bureau is based in the Prime Minister's Office. The National Cyber Bureau allocated NIS 180 million (circa US$50 million) over 2012–2014 to encourage cyber research and dual military–civilian R&D; the funding is also being used to develop human capital, including through the creation of cybersecurity centres at Israeli universities that are funded jointly by the National Cyber Bureau and the universities themselves.

In January 2014, the prime minister launched CyberSpark, Israel's cyber innovation park, as part of plans to turn Israel into a global cyber hub. Located in the city of Beer-Sheva to foster economic development in southern Israel, CyberSpark is a geographical cluster of leading cyber companies, multinational corporations and universities, involving Ben Gurion University of the Negev, technology defence units, specialized educational platforms and the national Cyber Event Readiness Team.

About half of the firms in CyberSpark are Israeli, mostly small to medium-sized. Multinational companies operating in CyberSpark include EMC2, IBM, Lockheed Martin, and Deutsche Telekom. PayPal recently acquired the Israeli start-up CyActive and has since announced plans to set up its second Israeli research centre in CyberSpark, with a focus on cybersecurity. This acquisition is just one of the many Israeli cybersecurity start-ups acquired by multinational companies in the past few years. Major acquisitions of Israeli start-ups in 2014 include Intellinx, purchased by Bottomline Technologies, and Cyvera, purchased by Palo Alto Networks.

The National Cyber Bureau has estimated that the number of Israeli cyberdefence companies had doubled in the past five years to about 300 by 2014. Israeli companies account for an estimated 10% of global sales, which currently total an estimated US$60 billion. Total research spending on cyberdefence in Israel quadrupled between 2010 and 2014 from US$50 million to US$200 million, bringing Israel's spending to about 15% of global research spending on cyberdefence in 2014. Cybersecurity technologies are exported by Israel in accordance with the Wassenaar Arrangement, a multilateral agreement on Export Controls for Conventional Arms and Dual-Use Goods and Technologies.

The Israeli cyber-intelligence firm, NSO Group Technologies had reportedly been selling its Pegasus spyware to the UAE, Saudi Arabia and other repressive Gulf states. In 2018, a lawsuit was filed against NSO accusing it of secretly helping Saudi Arabia to spy Jamal Khashoggi, a Washington Post columnist, later murdered in the Saudi Arabian consulate in Istanbul. In 2019, WhatsApp sued NSO.

=== Hydraulic engineering ===
Since rain falls only in the winter, and largely in the northern part of the country, irrigation and water engineering is vital to the country's economic survival and growth. Large-scale projects to direct water from rivers and reservoirs in the north, to make optimal use of groundwater, and to reclaim flood overflow and sewage have been undertaken. The largest such project was a national water distribution system called the National Carrier, completed in 1964, flowing from the country's biggest freshwater lake, the Sea of Galilee, to the northern Negev desert, through huge channels, pipes and tunnels. The Ashkelon seawater reverse osmosis (SWRO) desalination plant was the largest in the world at the time it was built. The project was developed as a BOT (build-operate-transfer) by a consortium of three international companies: Veolia water, IDE Technologies and Elran.

By 2019, desalination provided 70% of domestic and municipal water. The growing volume of desalinated water is creating challenges of its own. Lack of magnesium in the daily diet is associated with heart disease and this condition is becoming more prevalent in Israel in areas where desalinated water is the only source of drinking water, spurring discussion about whether to add magnesium to the water.

==== Water-saving technologies ====
According to water experts, pipe leakage is one of the major problems confronting the global water supply today. For Israel, which is two-thirds desert, water-saving technologies are of critical importance. The International Water Association has cited Israel as one of the leaders in innovative methods to reduce "non-revenue water," i.e., water lost in the system before reaching the customer.

=== Military engineering and technology ===
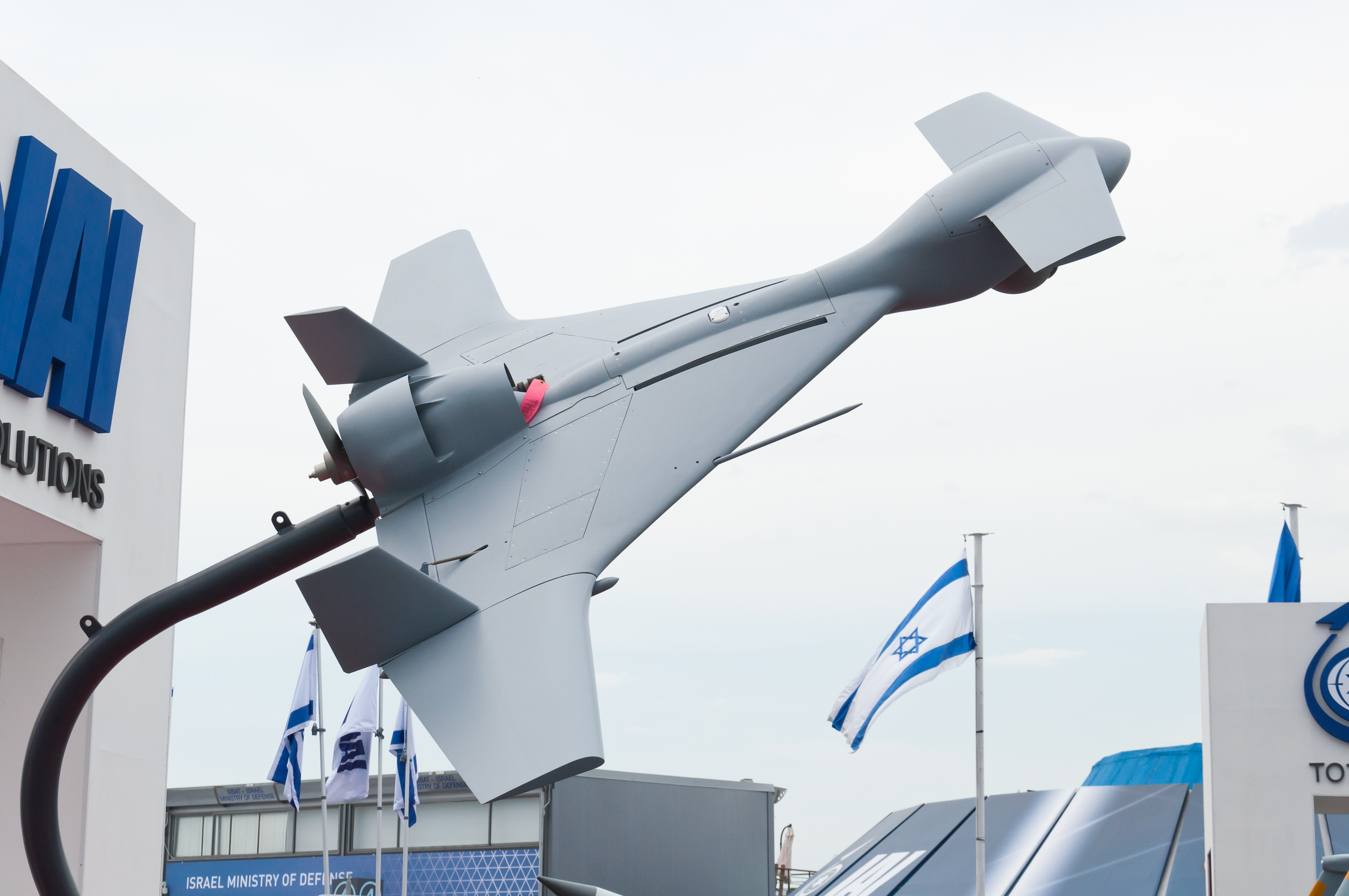
IAI Harop, Israel, is the world's largest exporter of drones.

Rejection of requests for weapons and technologies, arms sanctions and massive rearmament of the Arab countries prodded Israel into the development of a broad-based indigenous arms industry. The Israel Defense Forces relies heavily on local military technology and high-tech weapons systems designed and manufactured in Israel. Israeli-developed military equipment includes small arms, anti-tank rockets and missiles, boats and submarines, tanks, armored vehicles, artillery, unmanned surface vehicles, aircraft, unmanned aerial vehicles (UAVs), air-defense systems, weapon stations and radar. An impetus for the development of the industry was the embargo on arms sales to Israel during the Six-Day War which prompted Israel Aircraft Industries (IAI), founded as a maintenance facility in 1953, to begin developing and assembling its own aircraft, including the Kfir, the Arava and the Nesher.

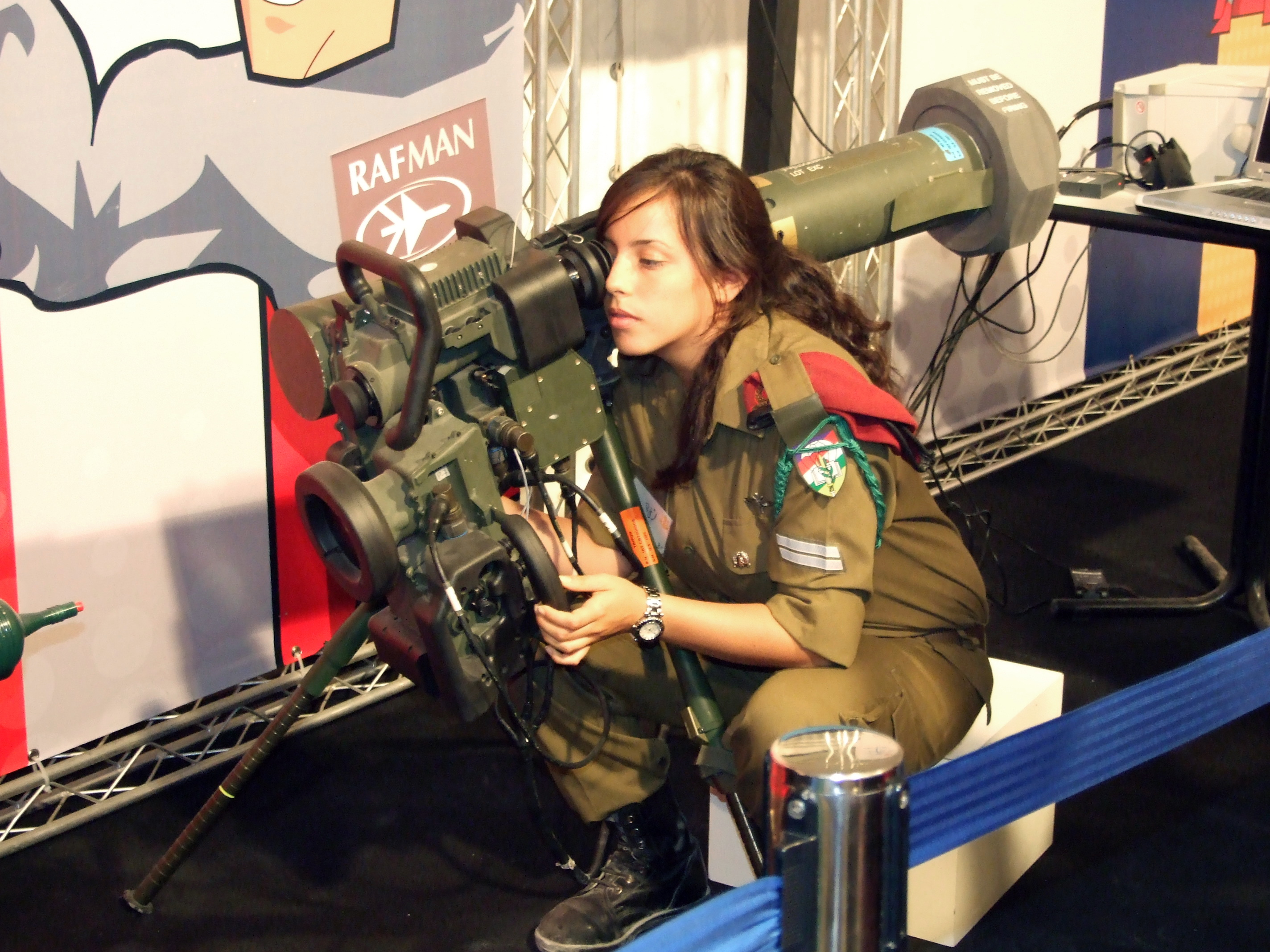
Israeli soldier with Spike (missile)

Notable technology includes the Uzi submachine gun, introduced in 1954, the country's main battle tank, the Merkava, and the jointly designed Israeli and U.S. Arrow missile, one of the world's only operational, advanced anti-ballistic missile systems. The Iron Dome mobile air defense system developed by Rafael Advanced Defense Systems is designed to intercept short-range rockets and artillery shells. The system was created as a defensive countermeasure to the rocket threat against Israel's civilian population on its northern and southern borders, and was declared operational and initially deployed in the first quarter of 2011. It is designed to intercept very short-range threats up to 70 kilometers in all-weather situations. On April 7, 2011, the system successfully intercepted a Grad rocket launched from Gaza, marking the first time in history a short-range rocket was ever intercepted.

Israel has also developed a network of reconnaissance satellites. The Ofeq (lit. Horizon) series (Ofeq 1 – Ofeq 7) were launched between 1988 and 2007. The satellites were carried by Shavit rockets launched from Palmachim Airbase. Both the satellites and the launchers were designed and manufactured by Israel Aerospace Industries (IAI), with Elbit Systems' El-Op division supplying the optical payload.

Israel also has the first all-around operational active defense system for tanks named Trophy, successfully intercepting anti tank missiles fired at Merkava tanks.

Israeli defense technology firm Kela Technologies is reducing cloud computing expenses for tracking companies through the acquisition of the artificial intelligence startup Pelanor, which specializes in the automatic identification of overhead costs. Kela re-emerged in March 2025 with the objective of providing Western militaries with a software platform aimed at promoting the adoption and integration of commercial technologies, including tablets, sensors, and radars, into current military systems.

According to a report released in January 2026 by Israel’s Ministry of Defense Directorate of Defense Research and Development (MAFAT), Israeli defense-tech startups secured NIS 1.08 billion in government orders during 2025. This investment is part of a strategic initiative to preserve Israel’s Qualitative Military Edge (QME) and ensure economic resilience by accelerating the "battle-to-innovation" cycle. The report highlights a significantly integration of early-stage commercial technology, such as AI-driven autonomous systems and counter-drone hardware, directly from the private sector into operational military use.

=== Life sciences ===
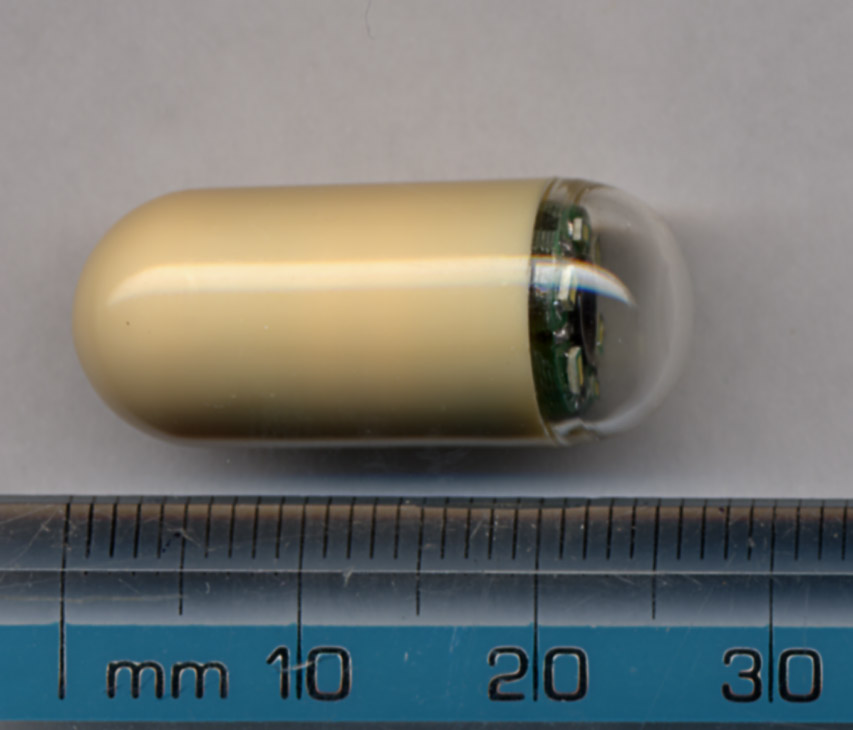
Given endoscopic capsule (Pillcam)

Israel often conducts medical and paramedical research, including bioengineering. Biotechnology, biomedical, and clinical research account for over half of the country's scientific publications, and the industrial sector has used its knowledge to develop pharmaceuticals, medical equipment and treatment therapies.

==== Biotechnology ====
Israel has over 900 biotechnology and life sciences companies in operation throughout the country with nearly 50 to 60 formed each year. Many multinational corporations such as J&J, Perrigo, GE Healthcare and Phillips Medical have all established branches in Israel.

==== Genetics and cancer research ====
Israeli scientists have developed methods for producing a human growth hormone and interferon, a group of proteins effective against viral infections. Copaxone, a medicine effective in the treatment of multiple sclerosis, was developed in Israel from basic research to industrial production. Genetic engineering has resulted in a wide range of diagnostic kits based on monoclonal antibodies, with other microbiological products.

Advanced stem cell research takes place in Israel. The first steps in the development of stem cell studies occurred in Israel, with research in this field dating back to studies of bone marrow stem cells in the early 1960s. By 2006, Israeli scientists were leaders on a per capita basis in the number of articles published in scientific journals related to stem cell research. In 2011, Israeli scientist Inbar Friedrich Ben-Nun led a team which produced the first stem cells from endangered species, a breakthrough that could save animals in danger of extinction. In 2012, Israel was one of the world leaders in stem cell research, with the largest number of articles, patents and research studies per capita.

==== Biomedical engineering ====
Sophisticated medical equipment for both diagnostic and treatment purposes has been developed and marketed worldwide, such as computer tomography (CT) scanners, magnetic resonance imaging (MRI) systems, ultrasound scanners, nuclear medical cameras, and surgical lasers. Other innovations include a controlled-release liquid polymer to prevent accumulation of tooth plaque, a device to reduce both benign and malignant swellings of the prostate gland, the use of botulin to correct eye squint, and a miniature camera encased in a swallowable capsule used to diagnose gastrointestinal disease, developed by Given Imaging. MeMic Medical LTD. founded in 2012 received its FDA approval in 2021 for its robotic platform for natural orifice transluminal endoscopic surgery (NOTES) for myomectomy through the vagina.

In 2009, scientists from several European countries and Israel developed a robotic prosthetic hand, called SmartHand, which functions like a real one, allowing patients to write with it, type on a keyboard, play piano and perform other fine movements. The prosthesis has sensors which enable the patient to sense real feeling in its fingertips. A new MRI system for identifying and diagnosing tumors developed at the Weizmann Institute has received approval from the U.S. Food and Drug Administration and is being used in diagnosing breast and testicular cancer. The new system will replace invasive procedures and eliminate waiting time for the results.

==== Pharmaceutical sciences ====
Teva Pharmaceutical Industries, headquartered in Petah Tikva, Israel, is the largest generic drug manufacturer in the world and one of the 20 largest pharmaceutical companies worldwide. It specializes in generic drugs and active pharmaceutical ingredients and has developed proprietary pharmaceuticals such as Copaxone and Laquinimod for the treatment of multiple sclerosis, and Rasagiline for the treatment of Parkinson's disease.

=== Quantum technology ===
In June 2024, the world's first quantum computing center, which has several different quantum computers able to hold different quibit modalities, was opened at Tel Aviv University.

In July 2026, the Israel Innovation Authority announced a NIS 100 million program to establish a national quantum computing research and development infrastructure. The program aims to enable Israeli researchers and companies to have access to advanced quantum computing capabilities as well as to support research, testing, and the development of quantum technologies.

=== Artificial intelligence ===
Israel has seen rapid growth in generative AI companies such as Bria, which develops ethically sourced and controllable image-generation models, Lightricks, known for creative-AI tools and its multimodal generative model Ltx-2, and Decart, which builds foundational AI models for enterprise and operational use cases.

== Science and technology newspapers in Israel ==
NoCamels and CTech are among several Israeli online websites that focus on Israeli innovation, science and technology.

== Nobel Prize laureates ==
Six Israelis have won the Nobel Prize for Chemistry. In 2004, biologists Avram Hershko and Aaron Ciechanover of the Technion – Israel Institute of Technology were two of the three winners of the prize, for the discovery of ubiquitin-mediated protein degradation. In 2009, Ada Yonath was a co-winner of the prize for her studies of the structure and function of the ribosome. She is the first Israeli woman to win a Nobel Prize. Michael Levitt and Arieh Warshel received the Nobel Prize in Chemistry in 2013 for the development of multiscale models for complex chemical systems.

Additionally, 1958 Medicine laureate Joshua Lederberg was born to Israeli Jewish parents, and 2004 Physics laureate David Gross grew up partly in Israel, where he obtained his undergraduate degree. In the social sciences, the Nobel Prize for Economics was awarded to Daniel Kahneman in 2002, to Robert Aumann of the Hebrew University in 2005, and to Joshua Angrist in 2021.

== Notable companies ==
=== Automotive ===
- Better Place
- Ituran
- Mobileye
- Robomow

=== Chemicals ===
- Adama
- Ahava
- Israel Chemicals

=== Clean technology ===
- BrightSource Energy
- Netafim
- Ormat Industries
- Plastro Irrigation Systems
- SolarEdge
- Solel

=== Medicine ===
- BioLineRx
- Compugen
- D. Medical Industries
- Given Imaging
- Insightec
- Kite Pharma
- Perrigo
- Pluristem Therapeutics
- Rosetta Genomics
- Syneron Medical
- Taro Pharmaceuticals
- Teva Pharmaceutical Industries

=== Defense contracting ===
- Elbit Systems
- Elisra
- Elta
- Israel Aerospace Industries
- Israel Military Industries
- Israel Shipyards
- Israel Weapon Industries
- Plasan
- Rafael Advanced Defense Systems
- Soltam Systems

=== Semiconductors ===
- Anobit
- Altair Semiconductor
- CEVA, Inc.
- EZchip Semiconductor
- Mellanox Technologies
- Nova Measuring Instruments
- Orbotech
- Tower Semiconductor
- Wilocity
- Zoran Corporation

=== Software and IT ===
- Aladdin Knowledge Systems
- Amdocs
- Babylon
- Boxee
- Check Point
- ClickSoftware Technologies
- Commtouch
- CTERA Networks
- Lightricks
- Magic Software Enterprises
- Marvell Software Solutions Israel
- Mirabilis
- Moovit
- M-Systems
- Ness Technologies
- NICE Systems
- Onavo
- Panorama Software
- Plarium
- Retalix
- Sapiens International Corporation
- Scitex Vision
- Secure Islands
- Shopping.com
- Wanova
- Waze
- Wix
- Wiz
- Zend Technologies

=== Telecommunications and computing ===
- Allot Communications
- Alvarion
- ASOCS
- AudioCodes
- Bezeq
- Ceragon
- Comverse
- ECI Telecom
- Humavox
- Gilat Satellite Networks
- Mellanox Technologies
- RAD Data Communications
- Radcom Ltd
- Radvision
- Radware
- Radwin
- Tadiran Telecom

== See also ==
- Economy of Israel
- History of IBM research in Israel
- Israel National Museum of Science, Technology, and Space
- Israel Patent Office
- List of Israeli companies quoted on the Nasdaq
- List of Israeli inventions and discoveries
- List of multinationals with research and development centres in Israel
- Science and technology in Asia
- Science and Technology Minister of Israel
- Silicon Wadi
- Start-up Nation
- Telecommunications in Israel
- Venture capital in Israel

== Sources ==
This article incorporates text from a free content work. Licensed under CC-BY-SA IGO 3.0. Text taken from UNESCO Science Report: towards 2030, 409-429, UNESCO, UNESCO Publishing.
