= Better Online Solutions =

B.O.S. Better Online Solutions Ltd.
- Type: Public
- Traded as: Nasdaq: BOSC
- Industry: Technology
- Founded: 1990; 36 years ago
- Founder: Israel Gal
- Headquarters: Rishon LeZion, Israel
- Key people: Eyal Cohen (CEO)
- Services: Information technology services
- Revenue: ▲US$ 33.187 million (2010)
- Operating income: ▲US$ 1.257 million (2010)
- Net income: ▲US$ –0.635 million (2010)
- Website: www.boscom.com

B.O.S. Better Online Solutions Ltd. is a publicly traded company, headquartered in Israel, that provides RFID and supply chain products and services. Its shares are traded on the NASDAQ Capital Market.

== History ==
B.O.S. Better Online Solutions was founded in 1990 by Israel (Izzy) Gal after he left IIS (Intelligent Information Systems, LTD., an Israeli company where Gal worked as a product manager for AS/400 related products. In its early years B.O.S. specialized in twinax terminal emulation software. In 2009 B.O.S. sold the rights to its e-Twinax Controller, a controller providing TCP/IP compatibility with older twinax devices without the use of SNA, to Phoenix-based 10ZiG Technology. In 2010 B.O.S. closed its two U.S. supply chain subsidiaries (formerly Summit Radio Corp.) due to turbulence in the executive jet market.

In 1996 B.O.S. began trading on what was then the Nasdaq SmallCap Market (today the Nasdaq Capital Market), and in 2000 the company's shares were upgraded to the Nasdaq National Market. Between 2002 and 2009 B.O.S. shares were listed on the Tel Aviv Stock Exchange. In 2009 B.O.S.'s shares were transferred to the Nasdaq Capital Market.

In 2004 Adiv Baruch replaced founder Israel Gal as CEO of the company. The company's current CEO is Eyal Cohen.

== Company ==
B.O.S. clients have included Unilever, Otto, IKEA, and Israel's Ministry of Agriculture.

=== Subsidiaries ===
- Dimex Systems – automatic data collection solutions provider
- Odem Electronic Technologies – electronic components supplier. Its clients have included Israel Aircraft Industries and Hollandia International.

=== Products ===
- BOS ID – software platform for inventory management
- BOSwine – RFID tagging system for monitoring the health and productivity of sows and piglets
- BOSWaste – RFID waste management system for tracking waste collection and controlling waste-management subcontractors

=== Acquisitions ===
Company	Year	Price	Reference
Pacific Information Systems	1998	$12.4 million	
Odem Electronic Technologies 1992 Ltd.	2004–05	$4.8 million	
Summit Radio Corp.	2007	$5.5 million	
Dimex Systems Ltd.	2008	$12.2 million	

== Awards ==
In 2011 B.O.S. was awarded Frost & Sullivan's Entrepreneurial Company of the Year award.

== See also ==
- Supply chain optimization
- Inventory management software
- Automatic identification and data capture
- List of Israeli companies quoted on the Nasdaq
