= BiondVax =

Vaccine company, Israel

BiondVax Pharmaceuticals Ltd.
- Company type: Public
- Traded as: Nasdaq: BVXV
- Industry: Pharmaceuticals
- Founded: 2003; 23 years ago
- Headquarters: Jerusalem, Israel
- Number of employees: 30 (2022)
- Website: www.biondvax.com

BiondVax Pharmaceuticals Ltd. is an Israeli biopharmaceutical company focused on developing and manufacturing immunotherapeutic products, primarily for the treatment of infectious diseases and autoimmune diseases.

In collaboration with the Max Planck Institute for Multidisciplinary Sciences (MPG) and the University Medical Center Göttingen (UMG), both in Germany, BiondVax develops nanosized antibody (NanoAb) therapies for diseases such as COVID-19, asthma and psoriasis.

== History ==
Since its founding, BiondVax has executed eight clinical trials, including a seven-country, 12,400-participant Phase 3 trial of a prior influenza vaccine candidate, and owns and operates a biologics manufacturing facility for housing its laboratories, production facilities and offices.

In 2017, their influenza vaccine was found in a Phase IIb trial to have "broad strain coverage."

In December 2021, BiondVax signed definitive agreements with the Max Planck Society – parent organization of the Max Planck Institute for Multidisciplinary Sciences – and the UMG to enter into a strategic collaboration for the development and commercialization of COVID-19 NanoAbs.

== See also ==
- COVID-19 vaccines
- Health care in Israel
- Science and technology in Israel
