= TAT Technologies =

Israeli company

TAT Technologies Ltd.
- Type: Public
- Traded as: Nasdaq: TATT; TASE: TATTF
- Industry: Diversified technology
- Founded: 1969; 57 years ago
- Founder: Shlomo Ostersetzer
- Headquarters: Charlotte, North Carolina, USA
- Key people: Igal Zamir (CEO and president)
- Products: Heat exchangers Cold plates Cooling systems Flow control valves
- Revenue: ▼US$ 79.76 million (2010)
- Operating income: ▼US$ –6.60 million (2010)
- Net income: ▼US$ –7.39 million (2010)
- Parent: KMN Holdings
- Website: tat-technologies.com

TAT Technologies Ltd. is a publicly traded company, headquartered in the United States, providing environmental control products and services for the commercial and military aviation industries. Its shares are traded on the NASDAQ Capital Market and on the Tel Aviv Stock Exchange.

== Operations ==
TAT Technologies is a manufacturer of environmental control systems for the commercial and military aviation industries. The systems it provides include heat exchangers and cooling systems, essential for the operation of aircraft machinery and electronics, as well as air conditioners for use in military installations and in armored vehicles. TAT's clients have included the United States Army, Boeing, Lockheed Martin, Cirrus Aircraft, and Embraer. The company's competitors include AMETEK, Honeywell International and Hamilton Sundstrand.

=== Subsidiaries ===
- TAT Tulsa. – manufacturer of heat transfer equipment.
- TAT Greensboro – provider of component maintenance and aircraft overhaul. Headquartered in Greensboro, North Carolina, the company's roots date back to the 1940s.
- TAT Israel – provider of jet engine component maintenance. Headquartered in Kiryat Gat.

== History ==
TAT Technologies was founded in Israel in 1969 by Shlomo Ostersetzer in response to a French arms embargo on combatants in the Six-Day War. The company was established with the goal of replacing the French aviation industry, upon which Israel had relied extensively until that time. TAT has been listed on the NASDAQ American stock exchange since 1987 and joined the Tel Aviv Stock Exchange in 2005. In 2007 the ownership of TAT was acquired from Ostersetzer and partner Dov Zeelim by Isal, a subsidiary of KMN Holdings, controlled by Roni Elroy, son-in-law of Yitzhak Tshuva.

=== Acquisitions ===
Company	Year	Price	Reference
Limco	1993		
Piedmont	2005	$15 million	Acquired via Limco
Bental	2008		

== See also ==
- France–Israel relations
- Thermal management of electronic devices and systems
- List of Israeli companies quoted on the Nasdaq
