= Teledata Networks =

Bankrupt Access network solutions company

Teledata Networks Ltd
- Company type: Private company
- Industry: Software, Communication systems, IT
- Founded: 1981
- Headquarters: Herzliya, Israel
- Key people: Eran Ziv, President and CEO
- Products: Next Generation Networks, Network access solutions
- Website: www.teledata-networks.com

Teledata Networks was a global provider of Access network solutions for Telecom Service Providers. The company created solutions that enable service providers to migrate to Next Generation Networks (NGN), and also support a Triple Play service portfolio.

== History ==
The company went bankrupt in 2013, but still providing support and maintenance in Brazil.

Teledata Networks was founded in 1981 as Teledata Communications Ltd. and listed on the NASDAQ in 1992 under the ticker symbol TLDCF. In 1998 it was acquired by ADC Telecommunications for $200 million and changed its name to ADC Teledata.

Since 2005 the company is a privately owned, in which the major shareholders are the Kardan group, Elron Electronic Industries, Infinity Private Equity Fund - an Israeli-Chinese equity fund, and the company’s management and employees.

== Customers ==
The company had an installed base of millions of lines in over 100 countries worldwide, including Germany (Deutsche Telekom), Turkey (Türk Telekom), Brazil (Brazil Telecom, Telefonica & Global Village Telecom), Chile (Telefonica), Mexico (Telmex), Israel (Bezeq), South Africa (Telkom), Australia (Telstra), Serbia (Telekom Srbija, Telenor).

== See also ==
- Silicon Wadi
- List of Israeli companies formerly quoted on NASDAQ
