= RiT Technologies =

Structured cabling management systems company

RiT Technologies Ltd.
- Company type: Public
- Traded as: Nasdaq: RITT
- Industry: Communication technology
- Founded: 1989
- Founder: Ofer Bengal, Yehuda and Zohar Zisapel
- Headquarters: Tel Aviv, Israel
- Key people: Yossi Ben-Harosh(President & CEO)
- Services: Infrastructure management services
- Revenue: ▲US$11.400 million (2010)
- Operating income: ▲US$–3.415 million (2010)
- Net income: ▲US$–3.486 million (2010)
- Website: www.rittech.com

RiT Technologies Ltd. is a publicly traded company, headquartered in Israel, that provides network management systems. Its shares are traded on the NASDAQ Capital Market.

== History ==
RiT Technologies was founded in 1989 by Ofer Bengal, who recruited brothers Yehuda and Zohar Zisapel as chief investors in the company. RiT's first product was an electrical connector, which competed with AMP Incorporated for market share. Their next product was PatchView, a network computer cable infrastructure management system. In 1997 RiT began marketing PairView, a system for monitoring and managing copper-wire telephone networks. Shares of RiT Technologies debuted on the NASDAQ Global Market in July 1997 and were transferred to the NASDAQ Capital Market in January 2004.

== Ownership ==
In September 2008, Moscow-based Stins Coman Inc., RiT's distributor in the Russian Federation, acquired a majority stake of 59.1% in the company, after having acquired 7% and then an additional 34.9% of RiT's outstanding shares earlier in the year.

== See also ==
- Structured cabling
- List of Israeli companies quoted on the Nasdaq
