= D. Medical Industries =

Holding company in Israel

D. Medical Industries Ltd.
- Company type: Public
- Traded as: TASE: DMED; Nasdaq: DMED
- Industry: Medical equipment
- Founded: July 22, 1992; 33 years ago
- Headquarters: Tirat HaCarmel, Israel
- Revenue: US$ 0.39 million (2011)
- Operating income: ▼US$ –12.34 million (2011)
- Net income: US$ –12.63 million (2011)
- Subsidiaries: Spring Health Solutions Ltd. Spring-Set Health Solutions Ltd.
- Website: dmedicalindustries.com

D. Medical Industries Ltd. is a publicly traded holding company, headquartered in Israel, that develops and markets insulin pumps and infusion sets through its subsidiary, Spring-Set Health Solutions. Shares of the company are traded on the Tel Aviv Stock Exchange.

== Company ==
D. Medical Industries develops, manufactures and markets insulin delivery devices for patients with diabetes. In 2010, 70% of people with diabetes lived in low- and middle-income countries, with the International Diabetes Federation projecting a 54% increase in the worldwide incidence of diabetes by 2030, particularly outside North America and Europe. According to the former CEO Efraim (Efri) Argaman, D. Medical's products are ideally suited for the developing world on account of their lower production costs: unlike the industry standard motor-and-gear train, D. Medical's technology is spring-based.

D. Medical's competitors include Medtronic, Roche, and Insulet. The company's Spring subsidiary is developing a semi-disposable hybrid patch pump that can be attached to the body or worn as a tubed pump. A year after having obtained ISO 13485:2003 and ISO 9001:2008 certification from the Canadian Medical Devices Conformity Assessment System, in 2012 D. Medical signed an original equipment manufacturer agreement with a South Korea-based worldwide distributor for its Spring Universal Detach Detect Infusion Sets.

=== Subsidiaries ===
- Spring Health Solutions Ltd.
- Spring-Set Health Solutions Ltd., formerly Nilimedix, markets its products under the Spring™ brand name.

=== Products ===
- Spring Zone Insulin Delivery System – insulin pump
- Spring Universal Infusion Set – FDA-approved (May 2011) semi-disposable insulin pump

== History ==
The company with which D. Medical was reverse-merged in 2004 was founded in 1992 as Peer Elevators and Industries (92) Ltd. (Hebrew: פאר מעליות ותעשיות (92) בע"מ). In 1994 Peer Elevators changed its name to Ram Tzur (or Ram Zur) Ltd. and went public on the Tel Aviv Stock Exchange. In 2001 Ram Tzur acquired the assets of Aryt Systems, a developer and manufacturer of advanced military equipment, and changed its name to Aryt Systems Ltd. In 2004 Aryt Systems, which had by that time become a shell company on the TASE Maintenance List, was acquired by Yehoshua Hershkovitz and sold to a group of investors comprising Zeev Bronfeld, Gal Erez, Eyal Sheratzky, and Meni Mor. They changed the name of the company to D. Medical Industries and used it to acquire a 73% stake in Nilimed, a Technion Entrepreneurial Incubator company.

In August 2010 D. Medical executed an initial public offering in the United States, raising $10.5 million. The company's shares were listed on the NASDAQ Capital Market until July 2012.

=== Mergers and acquisitions ===
In 2006 D. Medical acquired 72.99% of Nilimedix Ltd. for $1.5 million. Over time, it increased its stake in the company until as of 2010 it held 100% of Nilimedix's issued and outstanding share capital.

In 2007 D. Medical acquired 50.01% of Sindolor Medical Ltd. for $800,000. It reverse-merged the company with the shell company Sela Group and renamed it NextGen Biomed Ltd. In August 2011 D. Medical sold its stake in NextGen for $1.6 million.

== See also ==
- Insulin
- Diabetes management
- Blood glucose monitoring
- List of Israeli companies quoted on the Nasdaq
