= XTEND AI Robotics =

Israeli defense company

XTEND AI Robotics Inc
- Type: Public
- Traded as: Nasdaq: XTND
- Headquarters: Tampa, Florida

XTEND AI Robotics Inc is an Israeli defense company that makes human-guided autonomous machine systems. The company was founded as XTEND in Tel Aviv, Israel, and is currently headquartered in Tampa, Florida.

== History ==
In February 2026, XTEND announced plans to go public at a $1.5 billion valuation via a merge with New York Stock Exchange-listed JFB Construction Holdings, an American company based in Florida. Investors included Eric Trump, the son of US President Donald Trump.

In June 2026, XTEND was selected for Phase II of the US Defense Department’s Drone Dominance Program (DDP).

In September 2026, XTEND and American company JFB Construction Holdings combined in a share merger, and was renamed XTEND AI Robotics Inc. The company's shares began trading on the Nasdaq under the ticker XTND.

== Operations ==
As of July 2025, XTEND's AI-enabled systems are being used by the US Department of Defense, Singapore, Europe, the U.K. and Israel Defense Forces.

In September 2026, Conservative Gen Z influencer CJ Pearson registered under the Foreign Agents Registration Act (FARA) on behalf of Israel to lobby for XTEND.
