= Pluri Inc. =

Israeli biotechnology company

- Formerly: Pluristem Therapeutics
- Type: Public
- Traded as: Nasdaq: PLUR; TASE: PLUR
- Industry: Biotechnology
- Founded: May 11, 2001; 25 years ago
- Founder: Shai Meretzki
- Headquarters: Haifa, Israel
- Key people: Zami Aberman (CEO, chairman); Yaky Yanay (CEO, president)
- Revenue: ₪ 0 (2010)
- Operating income: ₪ –30.39 million (2010)
- Total assets: ₪ 27.97 million (2010)
- Number of employees: ~180
- Website: pluri-biotech.com

Pluri Inc., formerly Pluristem Therapeutics, is an Israeli company engaged in the development of human placental adherent stromal cells for commercial use in disease treatment. According to the company's website, it extracts adult stem cells exclusively from postnatal placentas.

== History ==
Pluristem was founded in 2001 by Shai Meretzki of the Technion, who made use of a stem cell patent which was developed during his Ph.D. studies at The Rappaport Faculty Of Medicine, Technion, under the supervision of Dr. Shosh Merchav, together with Professors Dov Zipori and Avinoam Kadouri from the Weizmann Institute of Science.

In 2003, the NASDAQ-listed shell company A1 Software acquired all shares and patents belonging to Pluristem and changed its name to Pluristem Life Systems. In 2007 the name was changed again, this time to Pluristem Therapeutics Inc. Pluristem's shares are traded on the NASDAQ exchange and the Tel Aviv Stock Exchange, as well as on the Frankfurt Stock Exchange.

In December 2020, the Genesis Prize and Start-up Nation Central named Pluri as one of the winners in a competition among Israeli high-tech and biotechnology companies.

In July 2022, the company changed its name from Pluristem Therapeutics to Pluri Inc. and its ticker symbol to PLUR from PSTI.

== Products ==
Pluristem is in the process of clinically testing the use of its PLX (PLacental eXpanded) cells in Phase I, Phase II and Phase III trials. A Phase III trial of PLX-(PAD)-peripheral arterial disease cells in the treatment of critical limb ischemia has been cleared to start enrolling patients by the U.S. Food and Drug Administration. The Phase III trial has also been cleared by regulators in Germany and the United Kingdom. Pluristem has completed enrollment of 172 patients in January 2017 for a multinational Phase II clinical trial of its PLX-PAD treatment pertaining to intermittent claudication. Results from the study suggest that PLX-R18 is safe and may significantly improve outcomes after bone marrow failure or hematopoietic cell transplantation. The U.S. Food and Drug Administration has also cleared Pluristem to commence patient enrollment in a Phase I trial of its PLX-R18 cells to treat insufficient hematopoietic recovery following bone marrow transplant.

PLX-R18 were initially developed with Professor Raphael Gorodetsky at Hadassah Hospital for the treatment of acute radiation syndrome and enhancement of bone marrow regeneration. The U.S. National Institutes of Health is currently evaluating Pluristem's PLX-R18 cells as a treatment for acute radiation syndrome. The dose finding portion of the study was successfully concluded and data showed that PLX-R18 treated subjects had an 85% survival rate compared to the placebo group which had a 50% survival rate. PLX-R18 can serve as a tool for governments to protect their citizens against potential exposure to nuclear radiation.

In May 2012, Pluristem reported that its experimental PLacental eXpanded cells were injected into the muscles of a 7-year-old Romanian girl undergoing treatment for bone marrow aplasia disease at the Hadassah Medical Center in Jerusalem. The girl had undergone two allogenic stem cell transplants since being admitted in August 2011, both of which failed to improve her condition. Two months thereafter, with the patient's condition deteriorating rapidly, the Director of Bone Marrow Transplantation, Cell Therapy and Transplantation Research Center at Hadassah felt that all available options had been exhausted and turned to Pluristem's PLX cells. The Helsinki committee at Israel's Ministry of Health approved the procedure under compassionate use. According to Pluristem CEO Zami Aberman, it was the first time ever that stem cells were injected into the muscle rather than into the body's blood system. Pluristem announced that the treatment led to a significant increase in the girl's red cells, white cells and platelets, effecting a reverse in her condition. She was released from the hospital soon after Pluristem's announcement.

In September 2012 Pluristem reported saving the life of a third bone marrow disease patient using its PLacental eXpanded cell treatment, again at Jerusalem's Hadassah Medical Center and again under the terms of compassionate use. The 45-year-old patient suffered from acute myeloid leukemia and pancytopenia, and his condition was determined to be life-threatening. After two intramuscular injections of Pluristem's PLX cells, the patient's condition improved significantly and he was released from the hospital. This event has been used as a supporting reference to the medical potential of the PLX cells.

In January 2016, the US Food and Drug Administration (FDA) gave Pluristem Therapeutics the go-ahead to move forward with its innovative treatment approach for hematopoietic disorders. Pluristem was given permission to begin its Phase I trial of PLX-R18 cells to treat incomplete hematopoietic recovery following Hematopoietic Cell Transplantation. The clinical trial is expected to begin in the coming months.

In 2020 Pluristem began treating COVID-19 patients with placenta cells known as PLX.

On May 8, 2020, the United States Food and Drug Administration approved Pluristem's application to conduct a Phase II study of its PLX cells (as described by HospiMedica.com, "PLX cells are allogeneic mesenchymal-like cells that have immunomodulatory properties that induce the immune system's natural regulatory T cells and M2 macrophages, and thus may prevent or reverse the dangerous overactivation of the immune system. Previous pre-clinical findings of PLX cells revealed therapeutic benefit in the treatment of severe Covid-19 cases").

== Collaboration and grants ==
Since 2007, Pluri has been engaged in a collaborative research agreement with the Charité – Berlin University of Medicine.

Pluri has been awarded several grants from the Israel Innovation Authority (IIA), formerly named the Office of the Chief Scientist.

Since 2016, the European Union's Horizon 2020 program has awarded millions of euros in grants to Pluri's clinical and research programs, including its Phase III study to treat critical limb ischemia (CLI) and its Phase III study to treat muscle injury following surgery for hip fracture.

Later in 2016, Pluristem announced it had partnered with Japan's Fukushima Medical University to test its placental-derived cellular therapy for radiation treatment and has been asked to join the United States National Institute of Allergy and Infectious Diseases program.

Since 2020, Pluri has been part of the CRISPR-IL consortium, funded by the Israel Innovation Authority. The partnership seeks to develop genetically edited PLX cells tailored for treatment of indications with unmet needs.

In January 2022, Pluri announced a collaboration with Israel's largest food producer, Tnuva, to produce sustainable cultured food. In recognition of their partnership, Pluri and Tnuva participated in the Nasdaq closing bell ceremony in March 2022. The company intends to present its technological proof of concept in 2022, with the goal of launching its first raw cultured meat product in 2023.

== See also ==
- List of Israeli companies quoted on the Nasdaq
