= Nova Ltd. =

Semiconductor company based in Israel

- Type: Public
- Traded as: Nasdaq: NVMI; TASE: NVMI
- Industry: Semiconductor
- Founded: May 1993; 33 years ago
- Founder: Giora Dishon, Moshe Finarov
- Headquarters: Rehovot, Israel
- Key people: Gaby Waisman (president & CEO)
- Services: Semiconductor equipment
- Revenue: ▲US$881 million (2025)
- Operating income: ▲US$253 million (2025)
- Net income: ▲US$259 million (2025)
- Number of employees: 1,612
- Website: novami.com

Nova Ltd., formerly known as Nova Measuring Instruments, is a publicly traded company that provides advanced metrology solutions for semiconductor manufacturing. Founded in 1993, the company specializes in dimensional, materials, and chemical metrology technologies. Nova is listed on both the NASDAQ Global Market and on the Tel Aviv Stock Exchange under the ticker symbol NVMI.

Nova was the pioneer of integrated metrology, revolutionizing the semiconductor industry by embedding measurement capabilities directly within process tools to enable real-time, wafer-to-wafer control.

== History ==
=== Founding and early years (1993–2000) ===
Nova was founded in May 1993 by Giora Dishon and Moshe Finarov.

In 1997, Intel Corporation both a client and an investor. Two years later, Nova expanded internationally with a subsidiary in Japan and operations in Singapore.

In 2000, Nova completed its initial public offering on the NASDAQ.

=== Expansion and listings (2000–2010) ===
In 2002, Nova’s shares were also listed on the Tel Aviv Stock Exchange (TASE).

In 2006 Nova acquired HyperNex Inc., a U.S.-based company specializing in microstructure analysis tools, expanding its technological base in materials characterization.

=== Acquisitions and rebranding (2011–present) ===
Nova Ltd. has pursued an inorganic growth strategy to broaden its process control capabilities through key acquisitions in materials, chemical, and dimensional metrology.

On April 2, 2015, the company completed the acquisition of Revera Inc., a U.S. developer of X-ray metrology solutions for complex film stack measurements, for $46.5 million, thereby integrating standalone X-ray Photoelectron Spectroscopy (XPS) into its portfolio.

At 2021 Nova rebranded as Nova Ltd.

Continuing its expansion into the back-end and advanced packaging markets, Nova acquired ancosys GmbH, a German leading provider of chemical analysis solutions, in February 2022 in an all-cash transaction valued at approximately $100 million.

In early 2025, the company further extended its dimensional metrology offerings for advanced packaging applications by finalizing the acquisition of Sentronics Metrology GmbH, a German developer of wafer metrology sensors, for approximately $60 million.

== Financials ==
For the full year 2024, Nova reported revenues of US$672.4 million, a 30% increase from FY 2023. Net income was US$183.8 million, up 35% year-over-year. The company achieved a profit margin of 27% and earnings per share of US$6.31.

== Leadership ==
As of 2023, Nova's President and CEO is Gaby Waisman.

== Product and Technology Lines ==
Nova Ltd. delivers metrology and process control solutions for semiconductor manufacturing across process steps, for logic, memory, advanced packaging and specialty devices.

Nova’s solutions combine integrated and standalone systems, implementing optical and materials technologies as well as chemical analysis, combined with software suites and utilizing AI and machine learning.

== Awards and Patents ==
In February 2019 Nova and GlobalFoundries Jointly awarded the 'Best Metrology Paper' at SPIE Advanced Lithography Conference, and in April 2022, Nova again awarded the "Best Metrology Paper" Jointly with IBM Research.

In March 2025, Nova and Samsung Electronics were jointly awarded the Vladimir Ukraintsev Award for 'Collaborations in Metrology' at the SPIE Advanced Lithography Conference.

== See also ==
- Metrology
- Semiconductor device fabrication
- TA BlueTech Index
- List of Israeli companies quoted on the Nasdaq
