= Zion Oil & Gas =

Oil and gas exploration company

Zion Oil & Gas, Inc.
- Type: Public OTCQB: ZNOG
- Industry: Petroleum industry
- Founded: 2000; 26 years ago
- Founder: John M. Brown
- Headquarters: Dallas, Texas, US
- Products: N/A
- Revenue: N/A (2023)
- Net income: ▲US$−7.957 million (2023)
- Total assets: ▼US$25.181 million (2023)
- Number of employees: 22 (December 2023)
- Website: zionoil.com

Zion Oil & Gas is an American exploration company headquartered in Dallas and incorporated in Delaware. The company has attempted to drill for oil and gas in Israel driven by its founder's Christian Zionist beliefs, but so far has failed to find any, "economically recoverable reserves." The company was listed on NASDAQ in February 2007, but was delisted on August 31, 2020.

== History ==
The company was founded in 2000 by former tool company executive John Brown with help from an oil-industry attorney named Philip Mandelker.

In 2002 Brown gifted 50,000 shares of Zion to televangelist Hal Lindsey. Lindsey's cousin, Ralph Devore owned 725,000 shares and was a founding member of Zion Oil & Gas's board of directors. Hal Lindsey would later promote the company to his audience without disclosing his family's connection to the firm. When asked about the issue by Mother Jones, Brown stated, "It was simply in my heart to give shares to people who loved Israel."
