= Enzymotec =

Israeli speciality chemicals company

Enzymotec Ltd.
- Company type: Public
- Traded as: NASDAQ: ENZY
- Industry: Food industry
- Founded: 1999; 26 years ago
- Founder: Dr. Sobhi Basheer
- Defunct: January 11, 2018; 7 years ago
- Fate: Acquired by Frutarom
- Headquarters: Migdal HaEmek, Israel
- Key people: Sobhi Basheer and Tali Sivan
- Products: Food ingredients Dietary supplements Medical food
- Revenue: $50.39 million (2015)
- Operating income: $6.17 million (2015)
- Net income: $6.68 million (2015)
- Number of employees: 124 (2015)
- Website: www.enzymotec.com

Enzymotec was an Israeli speciality chemicals company. It was acquired by Frutarom in Jan 2018.

== History ==
The company was founded in 1999 by Dr. Sobhi Basheer at the Naiot Venture Accelerator that markets products created from lipids from raw sources like fish and plants as food ingredients, dietary supplements, and medical food products for adults, children, and infants. As of 2013 it was the second biggest company in the global krill oil market with a 30% market share, and was emphasizing its potential for growth in the Chinese market for infant nutrition with its lipid-based InFat food ingredient.

It began selling medical food products in the US through its subsidiary, Vaya Pharma, in 2011.

As of 2013 Enzymotec had raised $17 million and was selling products globally, and in the summer of 2013 it filed a prospectus for its initial public offering on NASDAQ, seeking to raise around $75M; the IPO was held in October and raised $63M.

In 2014 Enzymotec settled litigation with Canada-based Neptune Technologies & Bioressources over patents held by Neptune related to phospholipids like omega-3 oil extracted from krill oil.

In 2015 shareholders filed a class action securities fraud case against Enzymotec over the IPO prospectus, claiming that the company's management had misrepresented its future profitability and the regulatory status of its products in China; most claims in the suit survived a motion to dismiss in December 2015.

Frutarom, which had built a minority position in the firm, announced on 29 Oct 2017 that it would acquire Enzymotec's remaining equity for approximately $168 million. After the transaction completed on 11 Jan 2018, Enzymotec delisted from the NASDAQ.
