= Syneron Medical =

Cosmetic surgery devices company

Syneron Medical Ltd.
- Company type: Private
- Industry: Healthcare
- Founded: 2000; 26 years ago
- Services: Medical appliances and equipment
- Website: syneron-candela.com

Syneron Medical Ltd., also known as Syneron Candela, is a company that develops and markets devices for cosmetic surgery procedures like hair removal and wrinkle treatments.

Syneron Medical was founded in 2000 by Shimon Eckhouse, after he departed from Lumenis, which he had founded in 1991, and which also sold medical devices for cosmetic treatments. Lumenis sued Eckhouse and Syneron in 2002 for theft of trade secrets. The litigation was resolved in 2004, with Syneron paying Lumenis $1.5M and royalties.

During the 2008 financial crisis, the company was not able to sustain its growth; it acquired Candela, which sold similar products to dermatologists and plastic surgeons.

In 2017 Syneron was acquired by Apax Partners, which took the company private.
