= List of multinational companies with research and development centres in Israel =

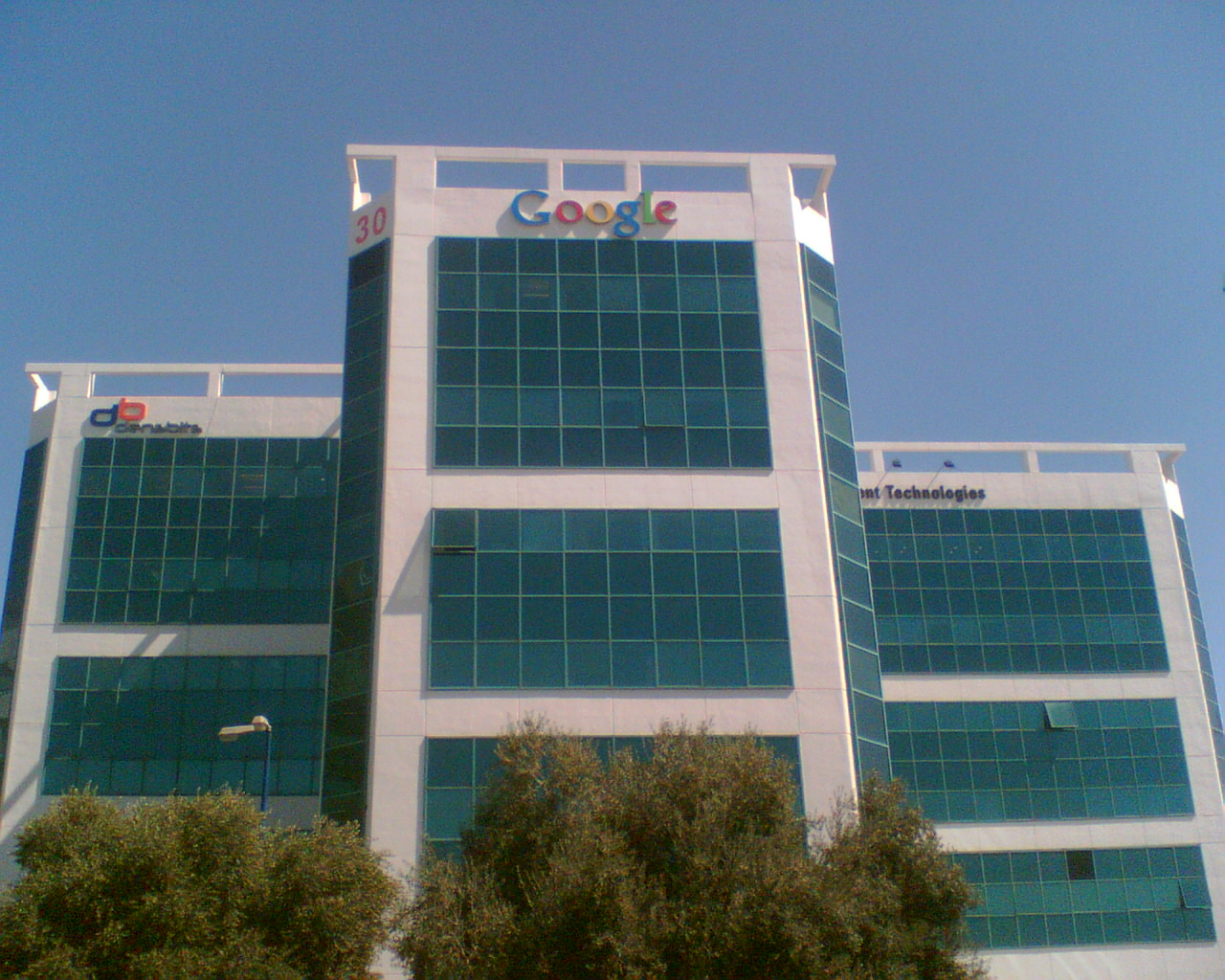
Google development center in Matam, Haifa

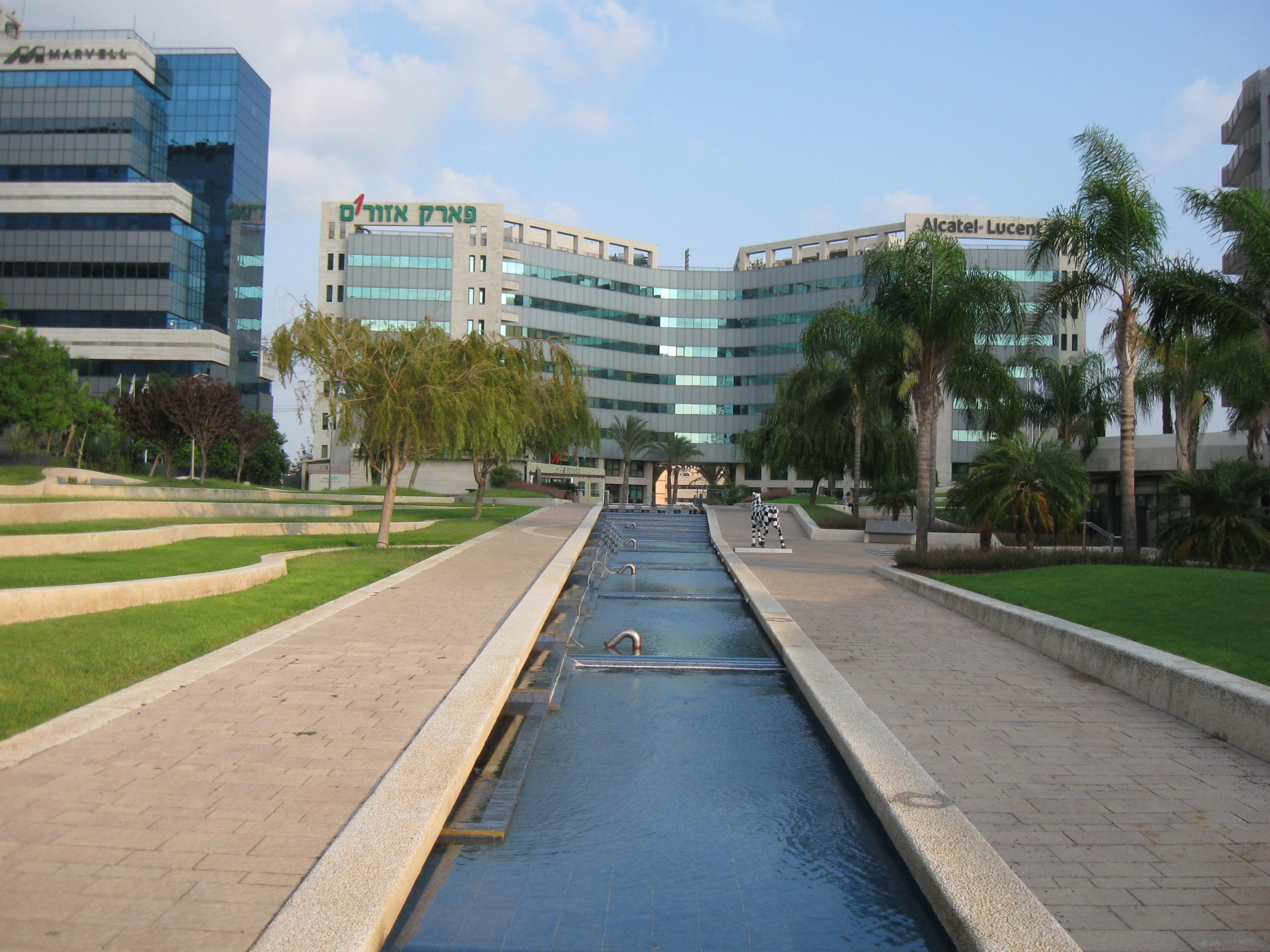
Alcatel-Lucent development center in Azorim technology park

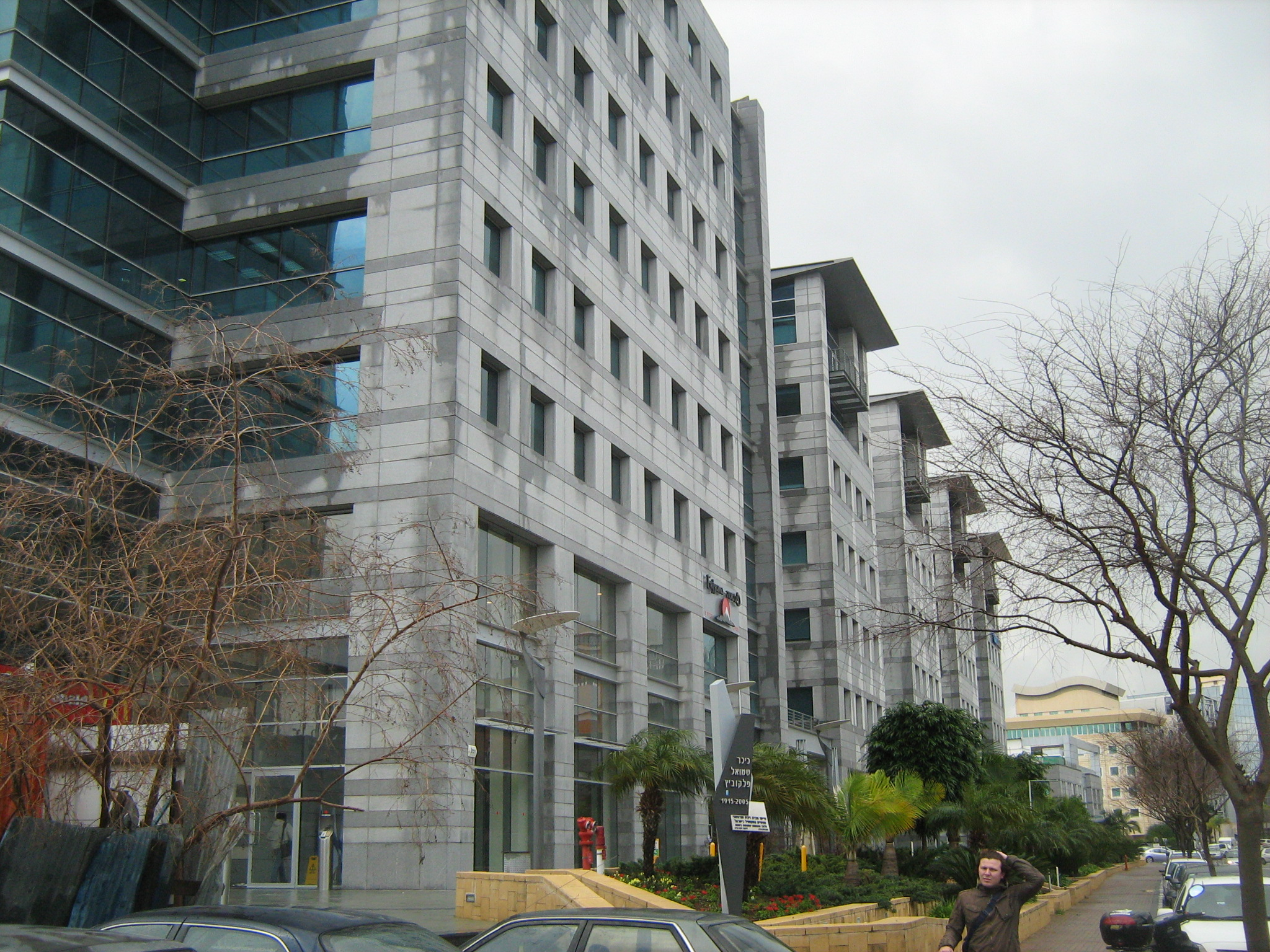
BMC Software development center in Tel Aviv

There are over 570 R&D centers in Israel owned by multinational companies.

Company	Country	Sector	Major acquisitions and investments
3M	United States	Electronics	Attenti
Amazon	United States	Internet	Annapurna Labs
Fujitsu	Japan	Information and communications technology	R&D center
Vimeo	United States	Internet	Magisto
AOL	United States	Internet	5min Media
Mercedes-Benz	Germany	Automobile	R&D Center
Yandex	Russia	Internet	KitLocate
Amobee	Singapore	Internet	Kontera Technologies
Apple	United States	Consumer electronics	Anobit, PrimeSense
Elastic NV	Netherlands	Internet, Software	R&D Center
Applied Materials	United States	Semiconductors	Orbot Instruments, Opal Technologies, Oramir Semiconductor
ARM Holdings	United Kingdom	Semiconductors	Sansa Security
Bosch	Germany	Electronics	
PTC	United States	Software, Internet of things, augmented reality	R&D center in the campus of the Technion – Israel Institute of Technology
AT&T	United States	Telecommunications	Interwise; R&D center (cloud solutions)
Autodesk	United States	Software	R&D Center
Toshiba	Japan	Electronics, semiconductors, Information technology	OCZ Storage Solutions
Alphabet	United States	Internet	Waze, Siemplify
Barclays	United Kingdom	Financial services	R&D Center
Blackberry	Canada	Telecommunications	WatchDox
BMC Software	United States	Software	New Dimension Software, Identify Software
Booking.com	Netherlands	Travel	Evature
Unilever	Netherlands	Consumer goods	
Snowflake Inc.	United States	Cloud computing	R&D Center
Broadcom	United States	Semiconductors	VisionTech, M-Stream, Siliquent Technologies, Dune Networks, Percello, Provigent, SC Square
ChemChina	China	Chemicals	Makhteshim Agan
Citigroup	United States	Financial services	R&D Center
Cisco	United States	Telecommunications	CLASS Data Systems, HyNEX, Seagull Semiconductor, PentaCom, P-Cube, Riverhead Networks, Intucell, Sheer Networks, NDS Group
ST Engineering	Singapore	Integrated engineering	
Dassault Systèmes	France	Software	
Dell	United States	Computer technology	R&D center
Dropbox	United States	Internet	Cloudon (2015)
TDK	Japan	Electronics	
eBay	United States	Internet	Shopping.com, Fraud Sciences, The Gift Project
EMC	United States	Computer technology	Kashya, nLayers, proActivity, Illuminator, ZettaPoint, Cyota, XtremIO
Meta Platforms	United States	Internet	Onavo, Pebbles Interfaces
Gemalto	France	Software	
General Electric	United States	Medical technology	Nuclear and MR businesses of Elscint, Diasonics Vingmed
General Motors	United States	Automotive	
Harman International Industries	United States	Electronics	Red Bend Software
HP	United States	Computer technology	Indigo Digital Press, Scitex Vision, Nur Macroprints, Mercury Interactive, Shunra
IBM	United States	Computer technology	Ubique, I-Logix, XIV, Guardium, Diligent Technologies, Storwize, Worklight, Trusteer Cloudigo
ICAP	United Kingdom	Financial services	Traiana
Škoda Auto	Czechia	Automobile	
Infosys	India	Information technology	Panaya
Intel	United States	Semiconductors	DSPC Envara, Comsys, InVision Biometrics, Telmap, Mobileye, Habana Labs, Moovit, Tower Semiconductor, Granulate
Intercontinental Exchange	United States	Financial services	SuperDerivatives
Intuit	United States	Software	Check, Porticor
Jain Irrigation Systems	India	Agricultural technology	NaanDan Irrigation Systems
John Deere	United States	Agricultural technology	
Johnson & Johnson	United States	Medical technology	Biosense
Kuang-Chi	China	Information technology	Agent Vi, Beyond Verbal, eyeSight Technologies
Legend	China	Information technology	
Lenovo	China	Consumer electronics	
LG	South Korea	Consumer electronics	Cybellum
Marvell Technology Group	United States	Semiconductors	Galileo Technology
McAfee	United States	Software	
Merck Group	Germany	Pharmaceutical, life sciences, material sciences	R&D Center, Healthcare BioIncubator, ExploreBio Biotech Incubator, PMatX Incubator, QLight Nanotech, Wiliot, Metabomed, ARTSaVIT, Medisafe, Neviah Genomics, ChanBio FeelIt Pantheon Biosciences
Micro Focus International	United Kingdom	Software	NetManage
Microsoft	United States	Software	Maximal, Peach Networks, Whale Communications, Gteko, YaData, 3DV Systems
Monsanto	United States	Agricultural technology	Rosetta Green (2013)
Motorola	United States	Telecommunications	Terayon, Bitband
Oracle	United States	Software	R&D Center
Nestlé	Switzerland	Food processing	Osem
Nokia	Finland	Telecommunications	LANNET, Chromatis Networks, Mobilitec
Nvidia	United States	Semiconductors	Mellanox Technologies, Research Center
PayPal	United States	Internet	CyActive, Curv
PepsiCo	United States	Food processing	SodaStream
Philips	Netherlands	Medical technology	R&D Center
Polycom	United States	Telecommunications	R&D Center
Qualcomm	United States	Semiconductors	R&D Center
Red Hat	United States	Software	Qumranet
Samsung	South Korea	Consumer electronics	Boxee
SAP	Germany	Software	OFEK-Tech, TopTier Software, TopManage, A2i, Gigya
Sears	United States	Retail	R&D Center
SeaGate	United States	Computer storage	R&D Center
Siemens	Germany	Electronics	R&D Center
Software AG	Germany	Software	R&D Center
Sony	Japan	Electronics	Altair Semiconductor
Sun Pharmaceutical	India	Pharmaceuticals	Taro Pharmaceuticals
SingTel	Singapore	Telecommunications	R&D Center
Syngenta	Switzerland	Agribusiness	Zeraim Gedera
Tata Group	India	Information technology	Technology Innovation Momentum Fund
Tech Mahindra	India	Telecommunications	Comverse Technology
Teradata	United States	Data warehousing	Appoxee
Teva Pharmaceutical Industries	Israel/United States	Pharmaceuticals	R&D Center
Texas Instruments	United States	Semiconductors	R&D Center
Western Digital / SanDisk	United States	Semiconductors	M-Systems
Xiaomi	China	Consumer electronics	R&D Center
Xerox	United States	Information technology	XMpie
Yahoo	United States	Internet	ClarityRay, Dapper, RayV
Hewlett Packard Enterprise	United States	information technology	R&D Center
Gartner	United States	information technology	R&D Center
Winbond	Taiwan	Semiconductors	R&D Center
Mitsubishi Corporation	Japan	International Trade	R&D Center
Salesforce	United States	Software	R&D Center
Palantir Technologies	United States	Software	R&D Center
Pfizer	United States	Pharmaceutical	R&D Center
Mastercard	United States	Financial services	R&D Center
kaspersky	Russia	Cybersecurity	R&D Center
Visa	United States	Financial services	R&D Center
Atos	France	Electronics, Cybersecurity	R&D Center
BNP Paribas	France	Banking, financial services	R&D Center
Thales Group	France	Electronics, aerospace, defence, transportation and security	R&D Center
Capgemini	France	Electronics, Cybersecurity	R&D Center
Carl Zeiss AG	Germany	Optoelectronics	R&D Center
Honda	Japan	Automobile	R&D Center
Bayer	Germany	Pharmaceutical	R&D Center
CA Technologies	United States	Business-to-business	R&D Center
Schneider Electric	France	Electronics	R&D Center
Ford Motor Company	United States	Automobile	R&D Center

== See also ==
- Economy of Israel
- IBM Israel
- List of Israeli companies quoted on the Nasdaq
- Science and technology in Israel
- Silicon Wadi
- Venture capital in Israel
