= Silicon Wadi =

Hub of advanced technology in Israel

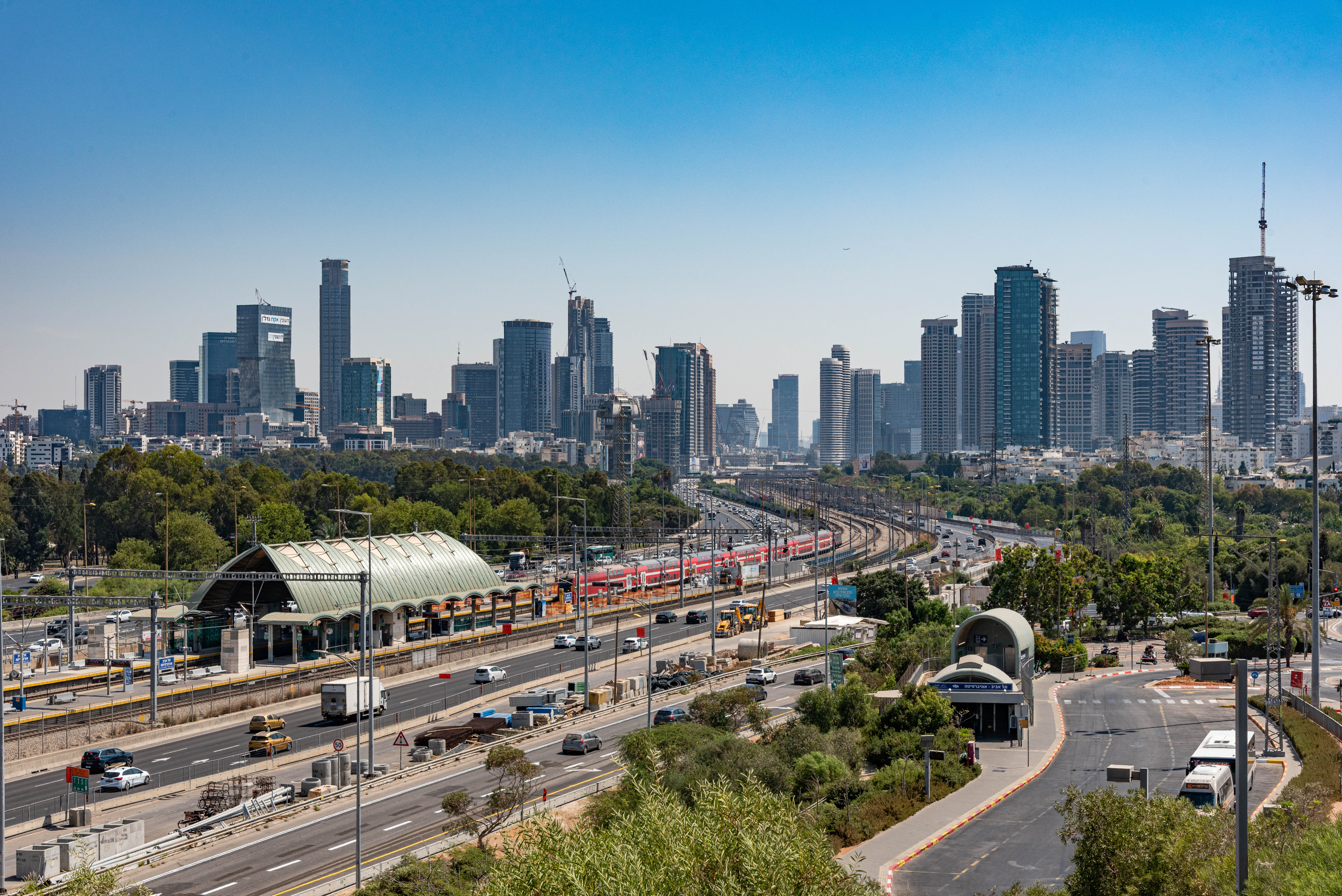
Tel Aviv skyline. Tel Aviv is considered the powerhouse of the Israeli high technology ecosystem.

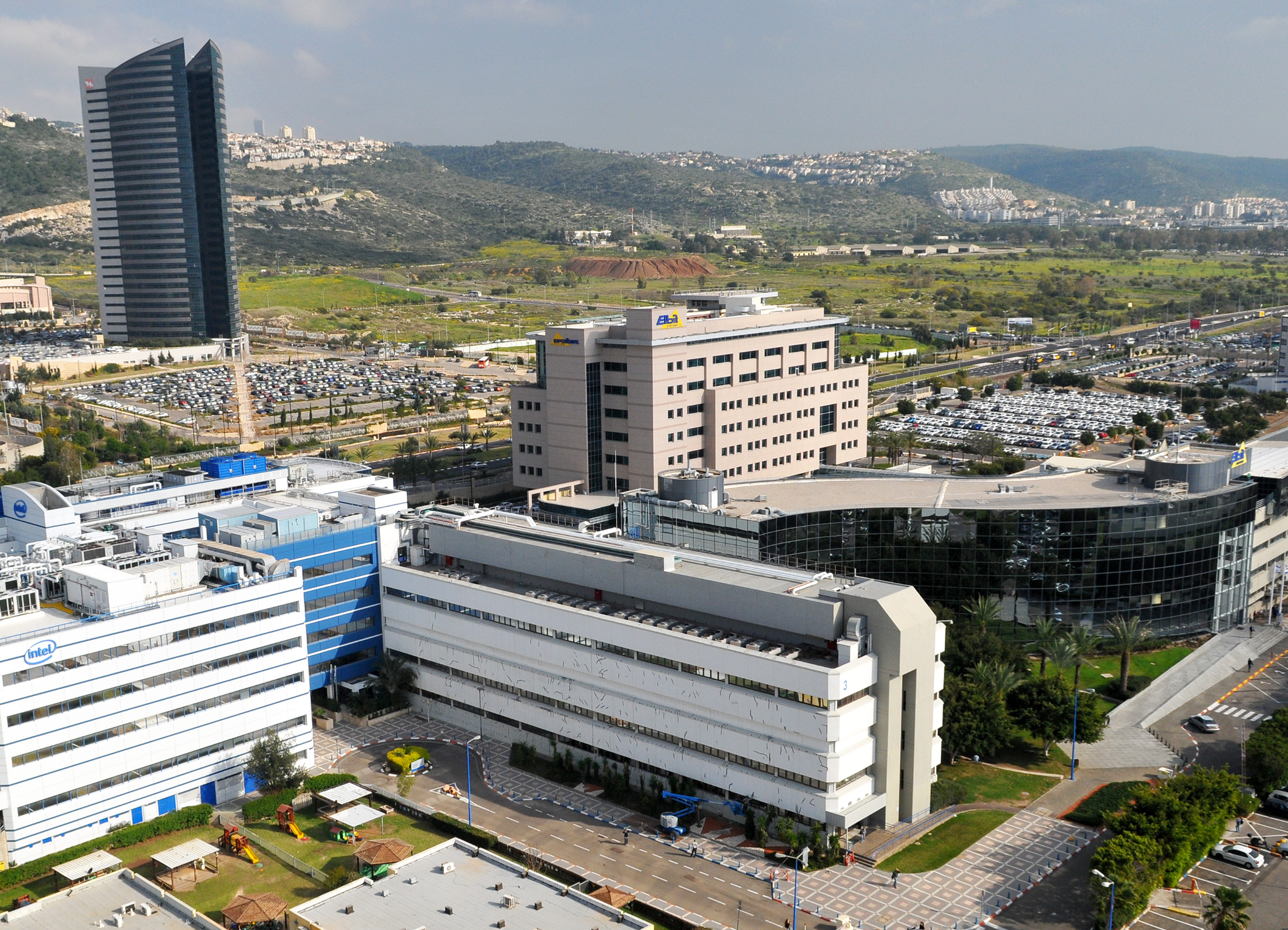
Matam high-tech park in Haifa

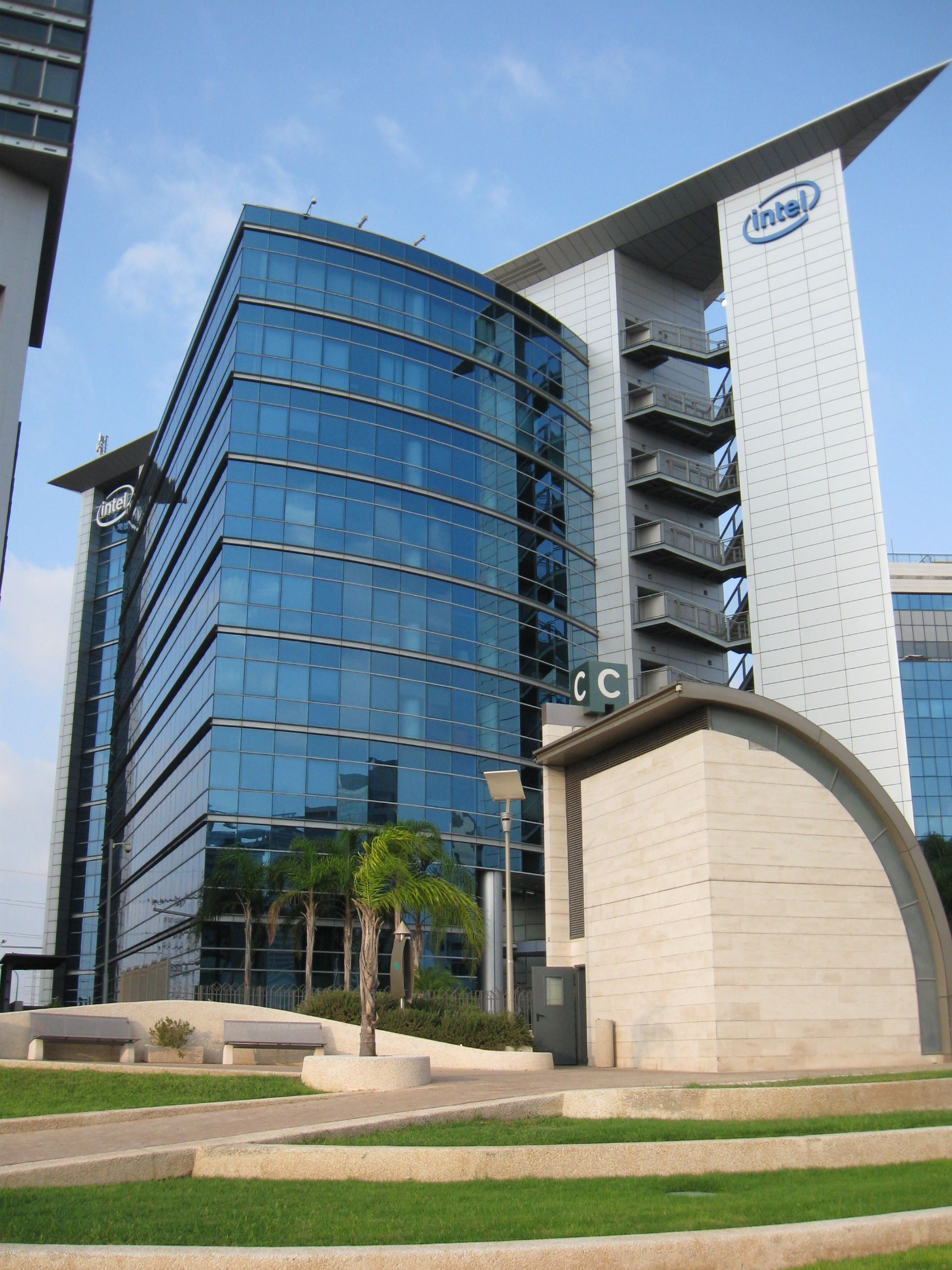
Intel building in Petah Tikva

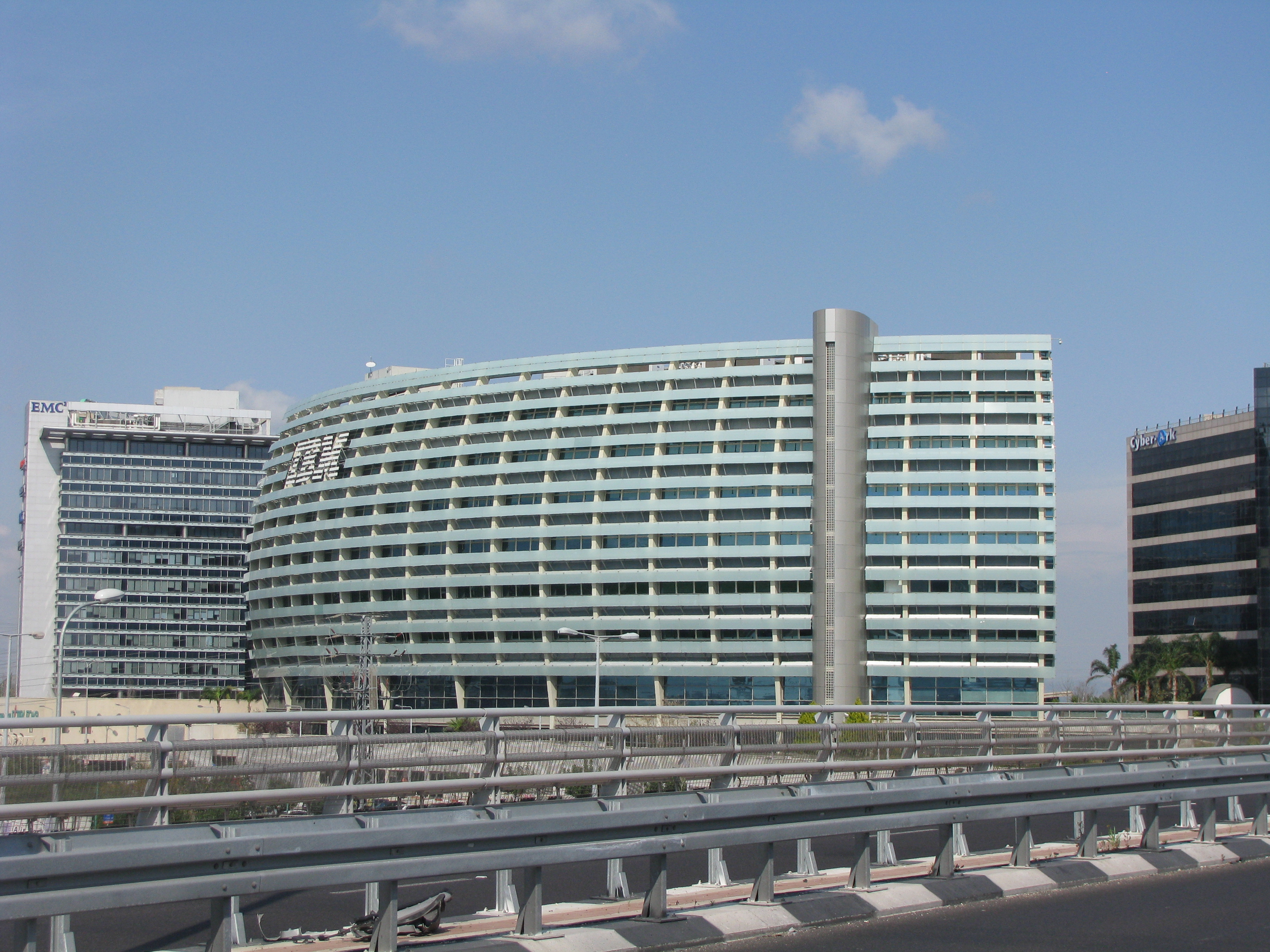
IBM building in Petah Tikva

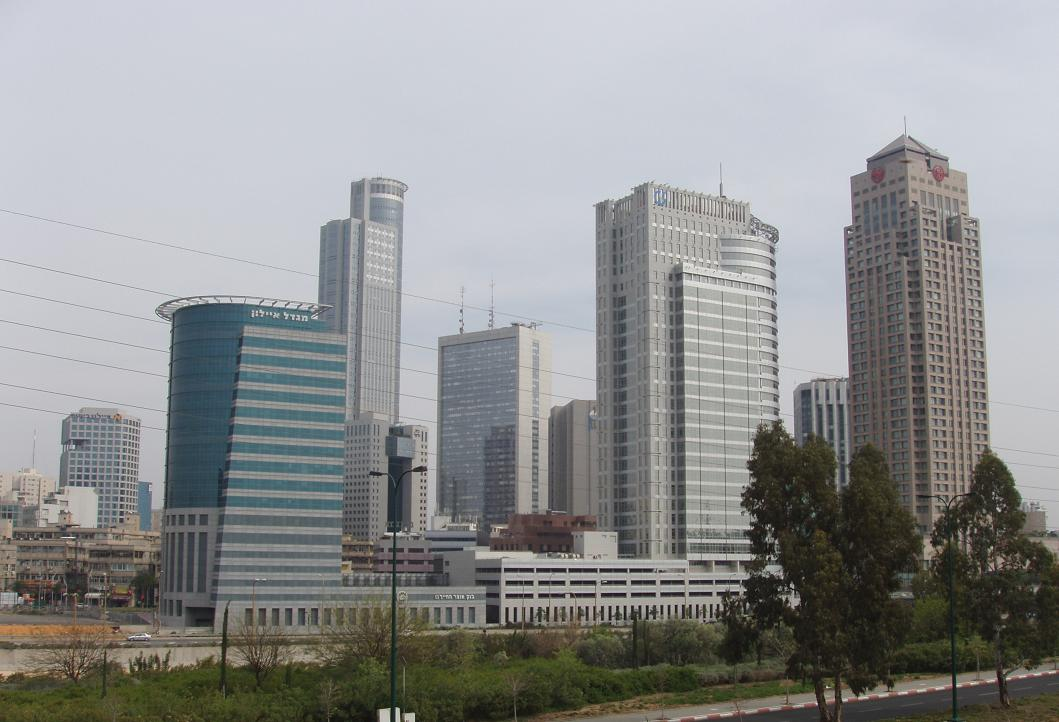
Diamond Exchange District in Ramat Gan

Silicon Wadi (Hebrew: סִילִיקוֹן וָאדִי, lit. 'Silicon Valley') is a region in Israel that serves as one of the global centres for advanced technology. It spans the Israeli coastal plain, and is cited as among the reasons why the country has become known as the world's "start-up nation" (see science and technology in Israel). The highest concentrations of high-tech industry in the region can be found around Tel Aviv, including small clusters around the cities of Raʽanana, Petah Tikva, Herzliya, Netanya, Rehovot, and Ness Ziona. Additional clusters of high-tech industry can be found in Haifa and Caesarea. More recent high-tech establishments have been raised in cities such as Jerusalem and Beersheba, in towns such as Yokneam Illit, and in Airport City. Israel has the third highest number of startups by region, the highest rate of startups per capita in the world, with one in three cybersecurity unicorns in the world being an Israeli company.

== Etymology ==
The term "Silicon Wadi" is a pun-name derived from a similarly high-tech region in the United States known as Silicon Valley, which is located in California. The word "wadi" derives from the Arabic "واد", meaning 'valley'.

== History ==
Israeli high-tech firms originally began to form in the 1960s. In 1961 ECI Telecom was founded, followed in 1962 by Tadiran and Elron Electronic Industries regarded by many to be the "Fairchild of Israel." The number of internationally successful firms grew slowly, with only one or two new successful firms each year until the early 1990s. Motorola was the first U.S. corporation to set up an R&D unit in Israel, in 1964. The center initially developed wireless products including remote irrigation systems and later developed leading chips such as the 68030. Following the 1967 French arms embargo, Israel was forced to develop a domestic military industry, focusing on developing a technological edge over its neighbors. Some of these military firms started to seek and develop civilian applications of military technology. In the 1970s more commercial innovations began, many of which were based on military R&D, including: Scitex digital printing systems, which were based on fast rotation drums from fast-rotation electronic warfare systems, and Elscint, which developed innovative medical imaging and became a leading force in its market.

High-tech firms continued to struggle throughout this period with marketing and many products, such as a mini-computer developed in the 1970s by Elbit, who were unable to successfully commercialise the product.In the 1970s, Intel and IBM both opened offices in Israel, IBM opened in 1972 and Intel opened in 1974.

=== Role in the global software market ===
Slowly, the international computing industry shifted the emphasis from hardware (in which Israel had no comparative advantage) to software products (in which human capital plays a larger role). The country became one of the first nations to compete in global software markets. By the 1980s a diverse set of software firms had developed. Each found niches which were not dominated by U.S. firms and between 1984 and 1991 "pure" software exports increased from $5 million to $110 million. Many of the important ideas here were developed by graduates of Mamram, the Israeli computer corps, established by the IDF in the 1960s.

During the 1980s and early 1990s several successful software companies emerged from Israel, including: Amdocs (established in 1982 as Aurec Information), Cimatron (established in 1982), Magic Software Enterprises (established in 1983), Comverse (established in 1983 as Efrat Future Technologies), Aladdin Knowledge Systems (established in 1985), NICE Systems (established in 1986), Mercury Interactive (established in 1989) and Check Point Software Technologies (established in 1993).

The 1990s saw the real takeoff of high-tech industries in Israel, with international media attention increasing awareness of innovation in the country. Growth increased, whilst new immigrants from the Soviet Union increased the available high-tech workforce. Many of these immigrants were highly skilled and educated which strengthened Israeli entrepreneurship research centers and universities. Peace agreements including the 1993 Oslo Peace Accord increased the investment environment and Silicon Wadi began to develop into a noticeable high-tech cluster.

=== Dot-com boom ===
In 1998, Mirabilis, an Israeli company that developed the ICQ instant messaging program, which revolutionized communication over the Internet, was purchased by America Online (AOL) for $407 million in cash, 18 months after it was founded and having no revenues. The free service attracted a user base of 15 million in that period and by 2001, ICQ had over 100 million users worldwide.

The success of Mirabilis triggered the dot-com boom in Israel; thousands of start-up companies were established between 1998 and 2001, while venture capital raised by Israeli companies reached $1,851 million in 1999, peaking at $3,701 million in 2000. Over fifty Israeli companies had initial public offerings on NASDAQ and other international stock markets during that period.

== Silicon Wadi today ==
The government assists industrial growth by providing low-rate loans from its development budget. The main limitations experienced by the industry are the scarcity of domestic raw materials, limited energy sources, and the restricted size of the domestic market. One certain advantage is that many Israeli university graduates are likely to become IT entrepreneurs or join startups, about twice as much as U.S. university graduates, who are also attracted to traditional corporate executive positions, according to Charles A. Holloway, co-director of the Center for Entrepreneurial Studies and a professor at the Stanford Graduate School of Business of Stanford University. ICQ, for instance, was one of the world's most famous Israeli software products, developed by 4 young entrepreneurs. IBM has its IBM Content Discovery Engineering Team in Jerusalem, which is part of a number of IBM R&D Labs in Israel.

Tel Aviv is a global innovation hub with multiple international companies including not only Volkswagen, Hyundai, Visa and Citi, have built their centers of innovation in the Tel Aviv region. Tel Aviv university in 2023 launched an aggregation center for innovation. Sampo, Jaguar and Amazon have also launched or are launching centers. Investment in Israeli startups in 2023 was $7 billion.

Israel has the third highest number of startups by region and the highest rate of startups per capita in the world.

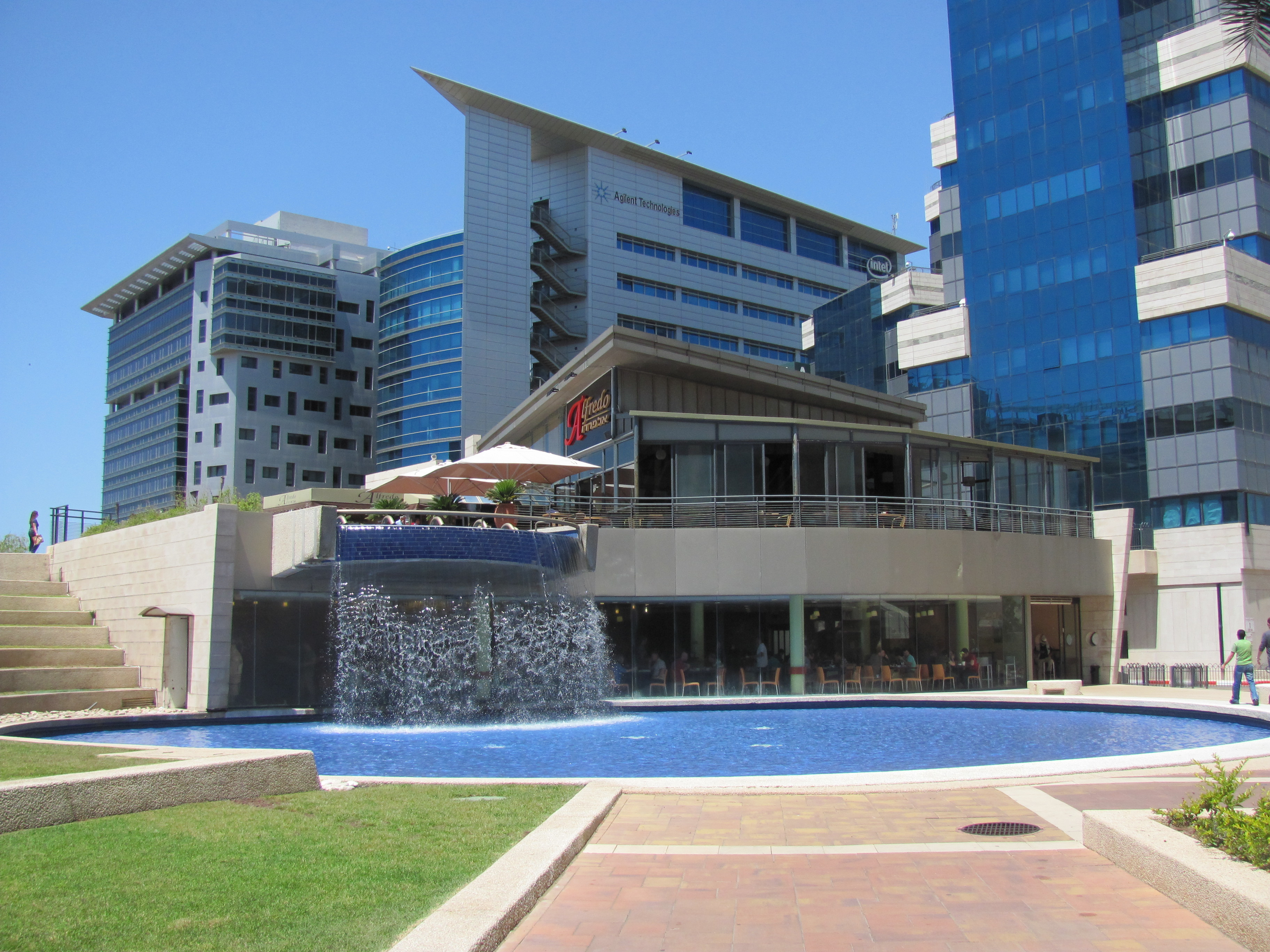
Azorim high-tech park in Petah Tikva

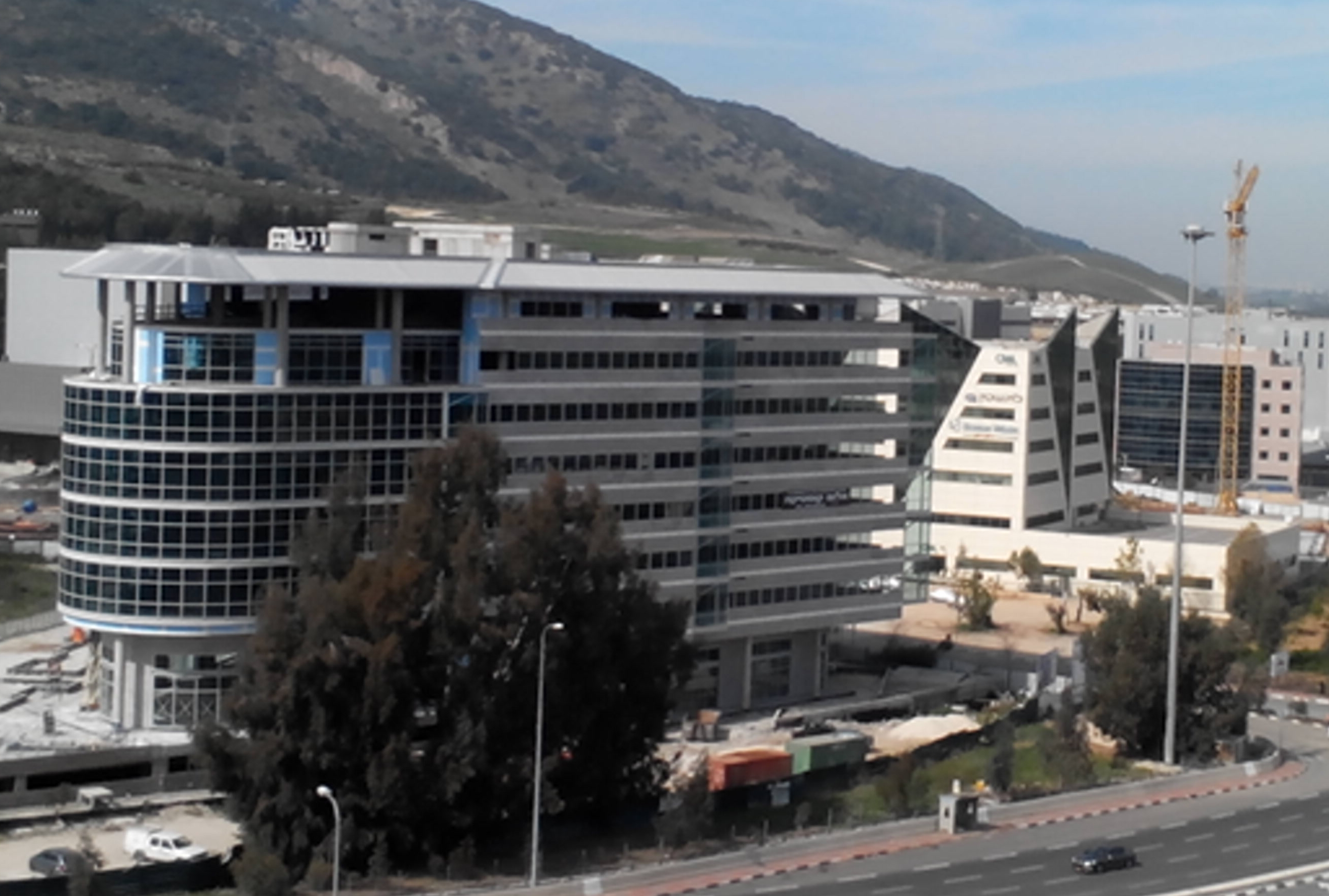
Start-up village high-tech park in Yokneam Illit

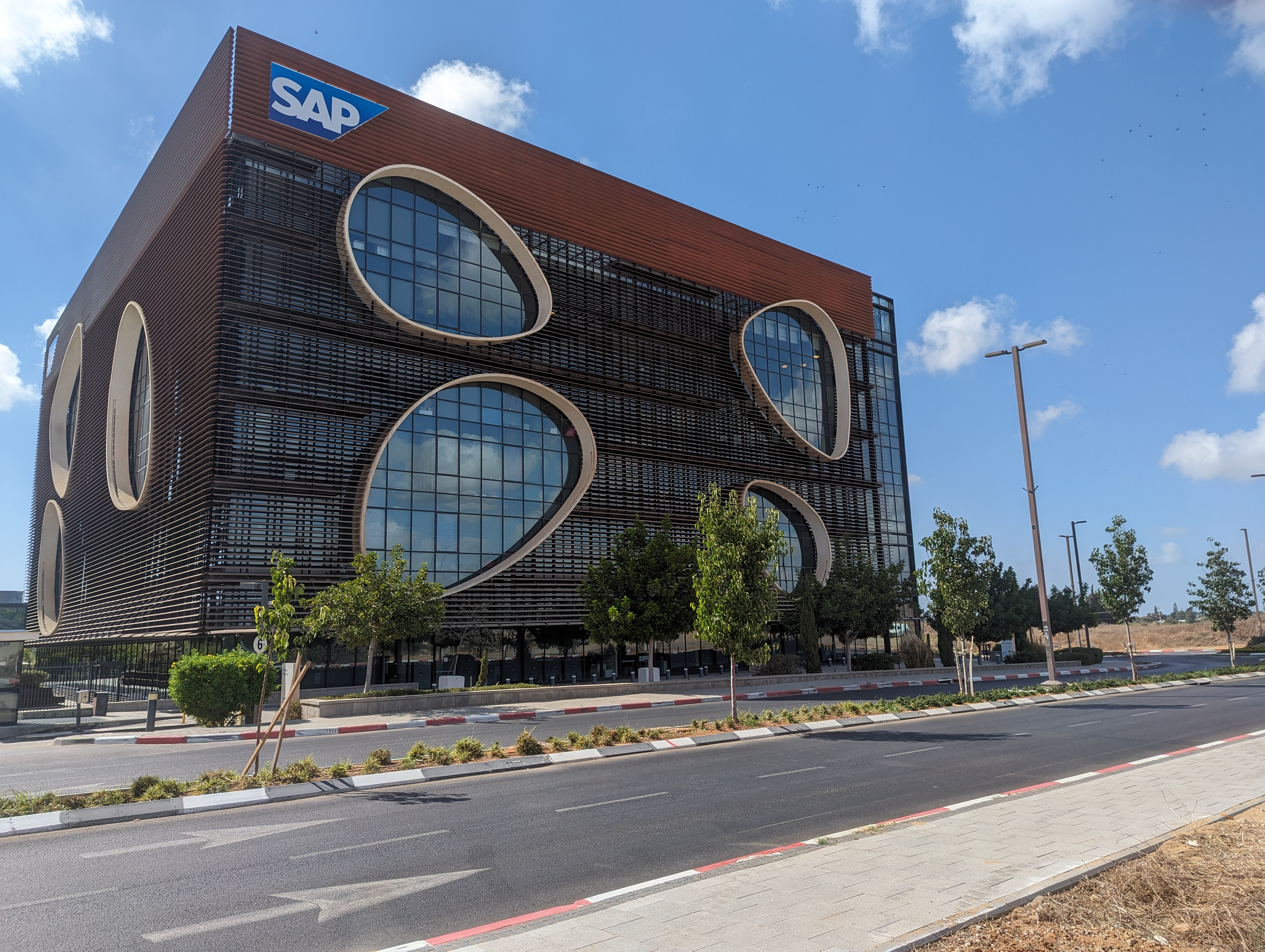
Atidim industrial zone in Raanana

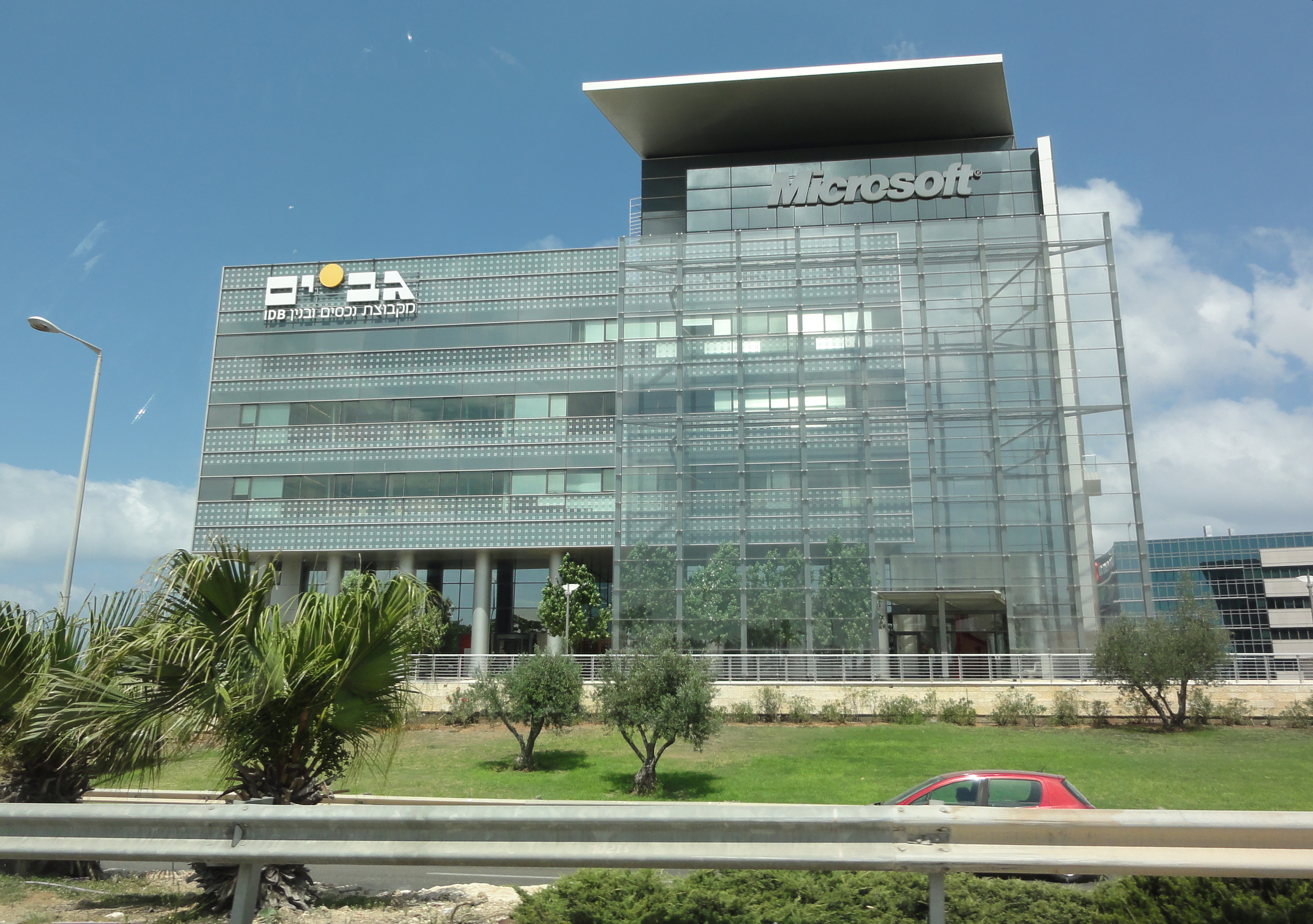
Microsoft building in Haifa

The RAD Group, founded in 1981 by brothers Yehuda and Zohar Zisapel, has been "the most fertile ground" for the creation of Israeli entrepreneurs, having produced 56 "serial entrepreneurs" who established more than one start-up each. RAD Group "graduates" were responsible for the establishment of a total of 111 significant high-tech initiatives.

The Israeli Quantum Computing Center was the first quantum computing center to have several different quantum computers able to hold different qubit modalities, which opened in June 2024 at Tel Aviv University.

Around 30 quantum startups are active in Israel as of 2024 according to Aviv Zeevi.

As of the middle of 2021, 29 unicorns, companies worth more than $1 billion, have been founded by Israelis. The scaleup of Israeli startups has led to Israel being dubbed "the scaleup nation". Total unicorns founded by Israelis, no matter their headquarters' location accounts for 71 unicorns.

== Location ==
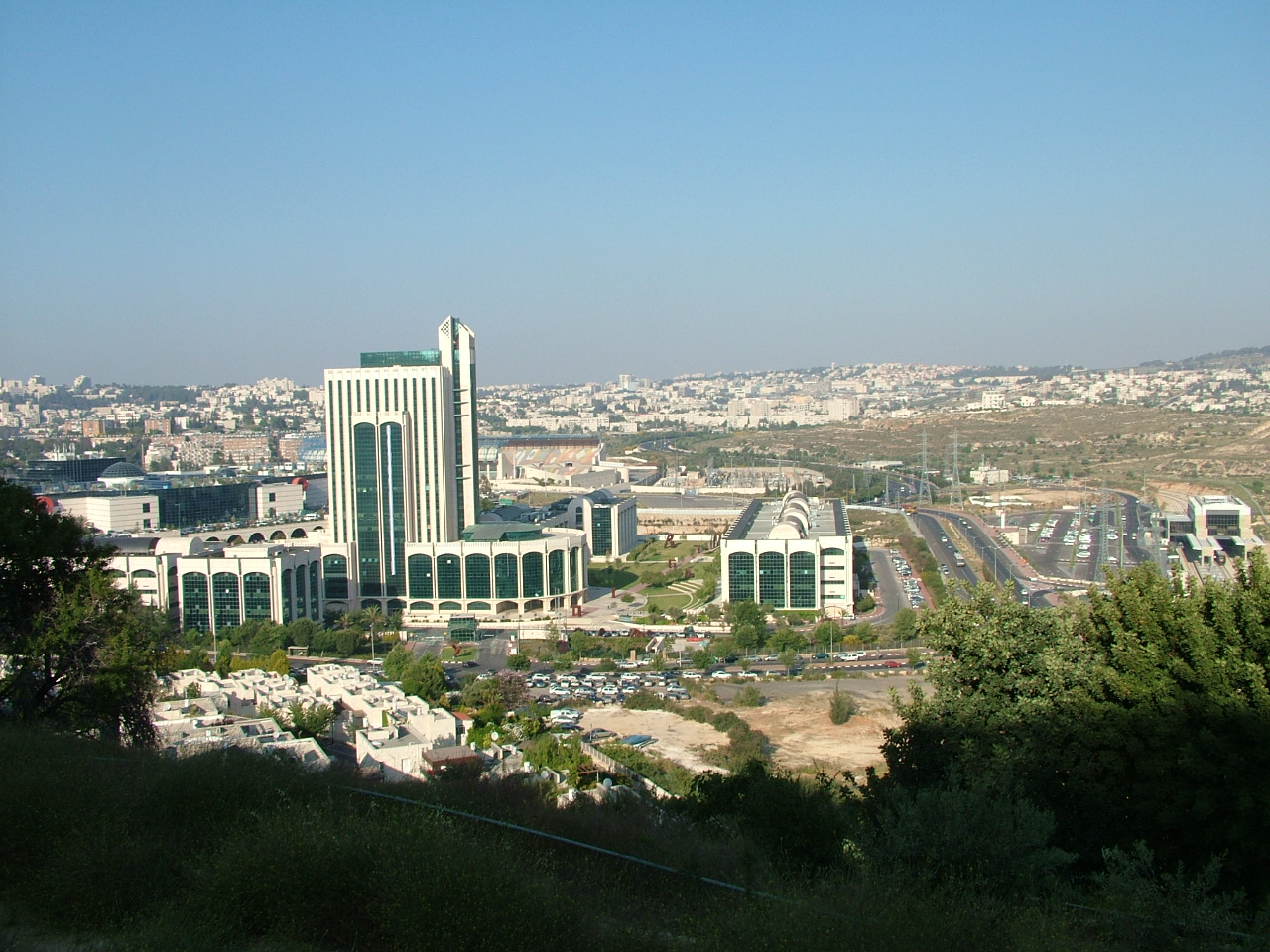
The Jerusalem Technology Park

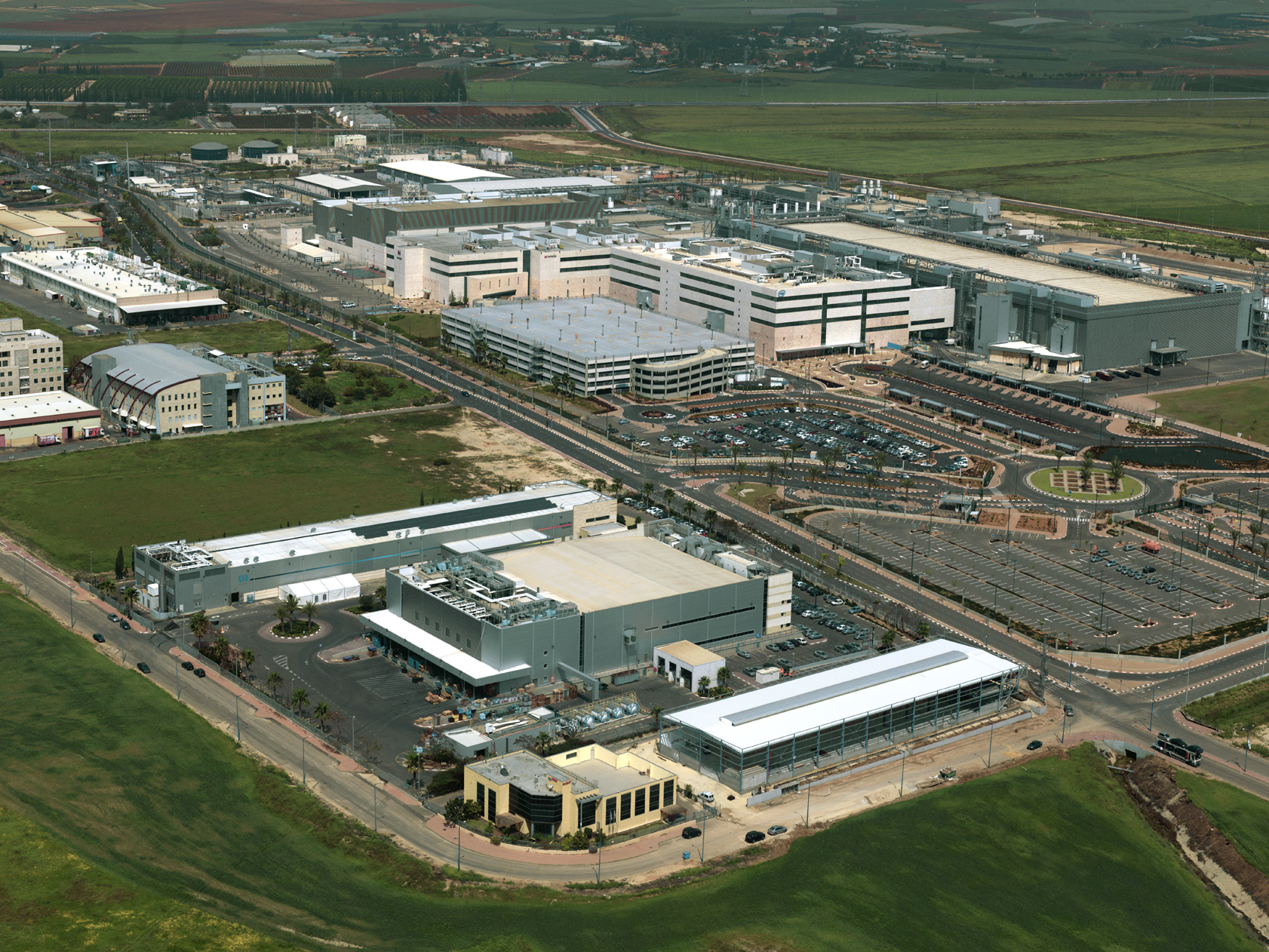
Hewlett-Packard, Intel, and Micron production plants in Kiryat Gat

Due to the small size of Israel, the concentration of high-tech firms across much of the country is enough for it to be recognised as one large cluster. Most activity is located in the densely populated areas of metropolitan Tel Aviv, Haifa (Matam), and Jerusalem (Technology Park, Malha, Har Hotzvim and JVP Media Quarter in Talpiot), and the Startup Village Ecosystem in the Yokneam area, although some secondary with additional activity include the corridor to Beer Sheba, including Kiryat Gat, and the Western Galilee. In all, this is an area no larger than 6000 square kilometers, half of the extended Silicon Valley's geographical coverage.

== Economy ==
In 2006, more than 3,000 start-ups were created in Israel, a number that is only second to the U.S. Newsweek Magazine has also named Tel Aviv as one of the world's top ten "Hot High-Tech Cities". In 1998, Tel Aviv was named by Newsweek as one of the ten technologically most influential cities in the world. In 2012, the city was also named one of the best places for high-tech startup companies, placed only second behind its California counterpart.

A cluster of software companies, who are monetizing "free" software downloads by adware or altering user's systems, has been dubbed Download Valley.

According to the 2025 State of FinTech report, published by Viola Ventures in January 2026, Israeli fintech companies performed strongly in 2025 and are entering a phase characterized by more sustainable business models and disciplined investment, rather than rapid “growth-at-all-costs” expansion. In 2025, Israeli fintech startups raised approximately $1.4 billion, and merger and acquisition activity surged to around $5.8 billion, highlighting increasing strategic demand for Israeli fintech assets in global markets. The report also notes that Israeli companies are particularly well-positioned internationally due to entrepreneurial talent and strong execution capabilities, reinforcing their significance within the broader Silicon Wadi ecosystem.

== Israeli venture capital industry ==
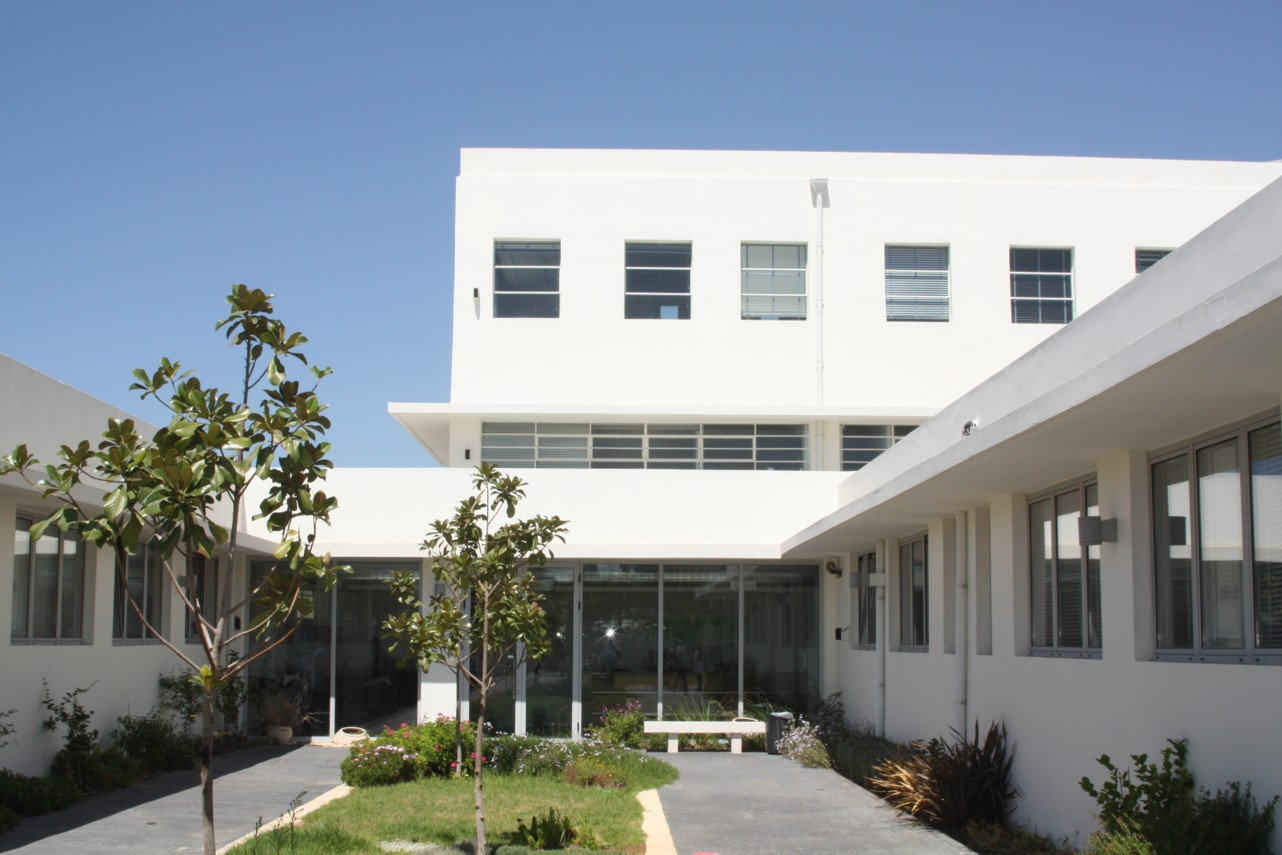
Jerusalem Venture Partners (JVP) compound in Jerusalem, one of Israel's largest venture capital firms

The origins of the now thriving venture capital industry in Israel can be traced to a $100 million government initiative in 1993 named the Yozma program ("Initiative" in Hebrew); which offered attractive tax incentives to any foreign venture-capital investments in Israel and offered to double any investment with funds from the government. As a result, Between 1991 and 2000, Israel's annual venture-capital outlays, nearly all private, rose nearly 60-fold, from $58 million to $3.3 billion; companies launched by Israeli venture funds rose from 100 to 800; and Israel's information-technology revenues rose from $1.6 billion to $12.5 billion. By 1999, Israel ranked second only to the United States in invested private-equity capital as a share of GDP. And it led the world in the share of its growth attributable to high-tech ventures: 70 percent.

Israel's thriving venture capital industry has played an important role in financing and funding Silicon Wadi. The 2008 financial crisis affected the availability of venture capital locally. In 2009, there were 63 mergers and acquisitions in the Israeli market worth a total of $2.54 billion; 7% below 2008 levels ($2.74 billion), when 82 Israeli companies were merged or acquired, and 33% lower than 2007 proceeds ($3.79 billion) when 87 Israeli companies were merged or acquired. Numerous high tech Israeli companies have been acquired by global multinational corporations for its provision of profit-driven technologies along with its reliable and quality corporate personnel. The March acquisition of Israeli company Mellanox for $6.9 billion by Nvidia Corporation is a definite contender for the largest M&A deal in 2019. Generally, Israeli startups are becoming so attractive that U.S. companies tend to acquire them more than anyone else: they account for half of all transactions in 2018. Thus, Israels eventually became a "net seller".

Israel's venture capital industry has about 70 active venture capital funds, of which 14 international VCs with Israeli offices. Additionally, there are some 220 international funds, including Polaris Venture Partners, Accel Partners and Greylock Partners, that do not have branches in Israel, but actively invest in Israel through an in-house specialist.

In 2009, the life sciences sector led the market with $272 million or 24% of total capital raised, followed by the software sector with $258 million or 23%, the communications sector with $219 million or 20%, and the Internet sector with 13% of capital raised in 2009.

== Multinational technology companies operating in Israel ==
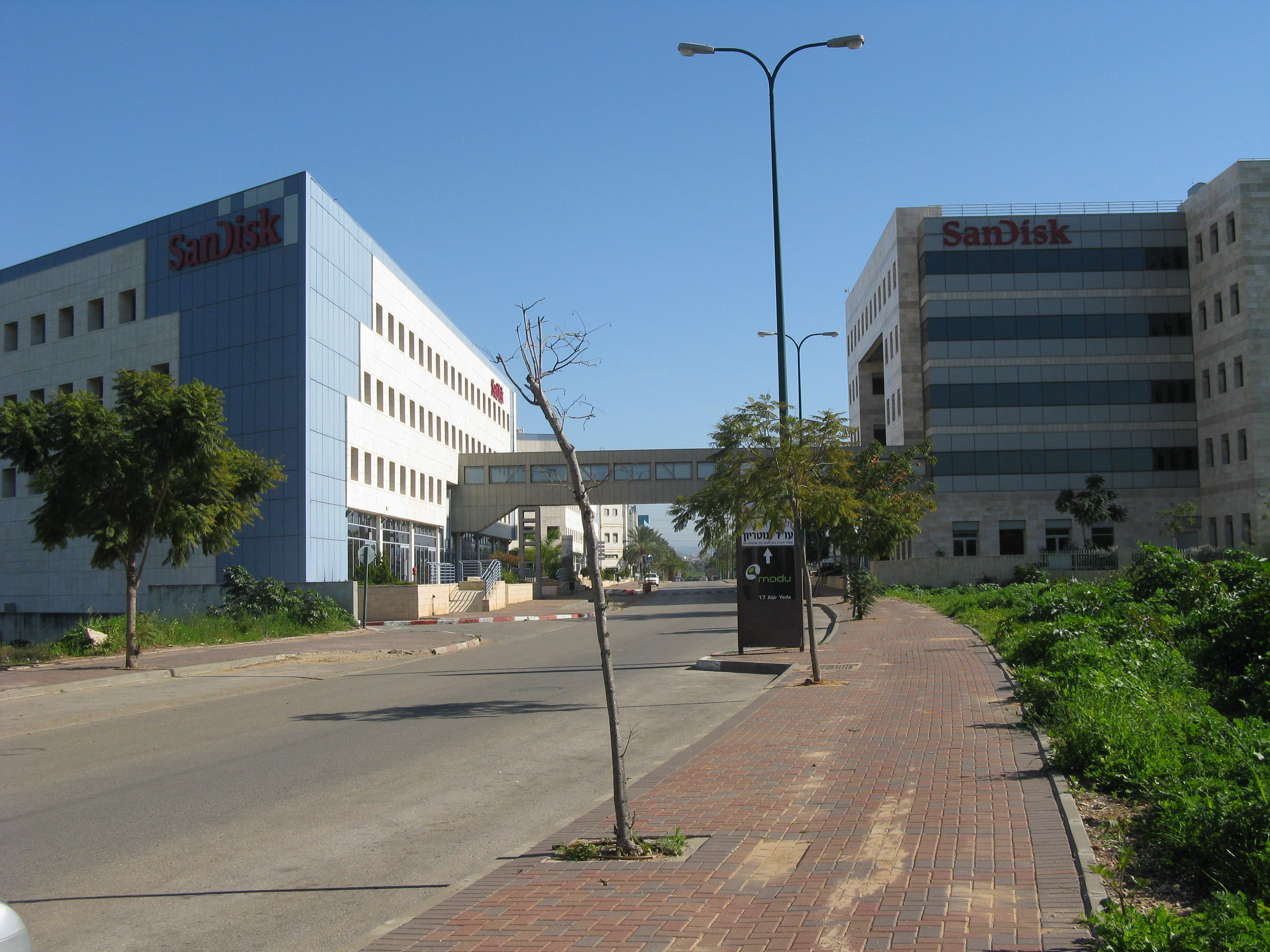
SanDisk facility in Kfar Saba

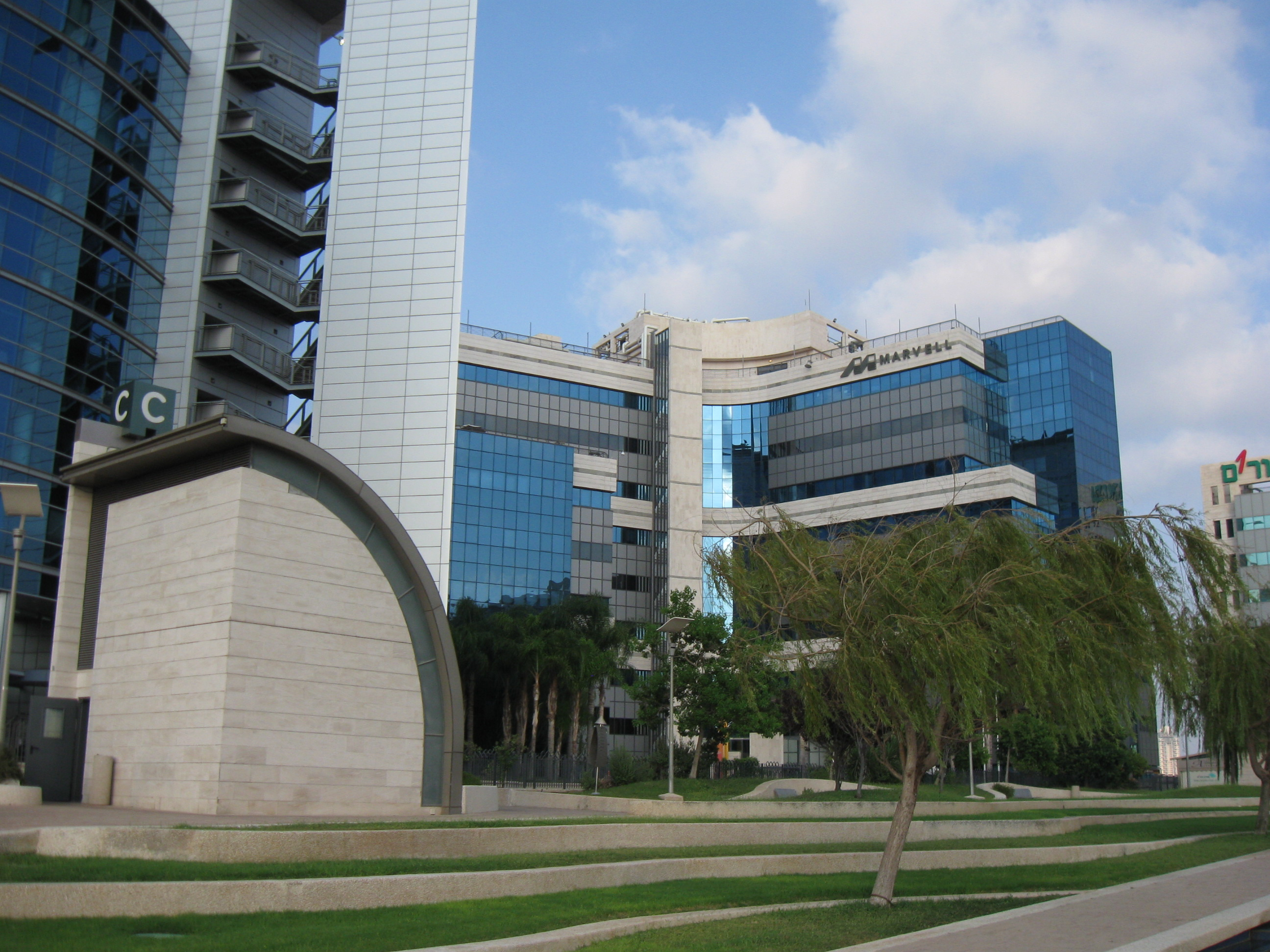
Marvell Technology Inc. development centre in Petah Tikva

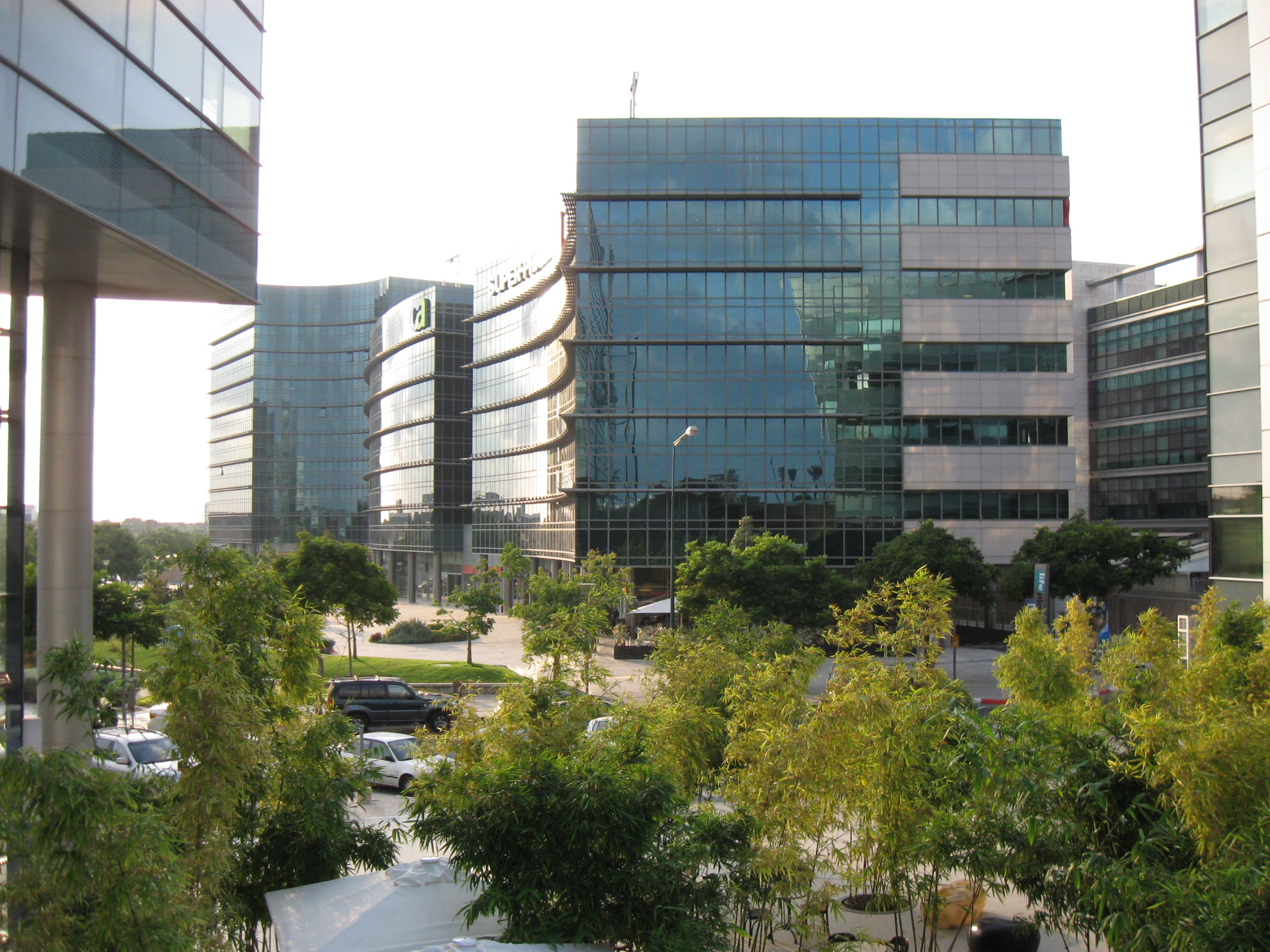
CA Technologies development centre in Herzliya

As of 2010, more than 35,000 Israeli personnel were employed in various research and development centers operated by multinational corporations with a presence across Israel. In recent years, East Asian multinational corporations and investors, especially from Mainland China, have actively invested and opened up offices in Israel, including Chinese technology giants such as Alibaba, Baidu, Tencent and Kuang-Chi. Around 60 foreign R&D centers are engaged in a diverse range of activities including biotechnology, chemicals, industrial machinery, communication equipment, scientific instruments, medical devices, flash memory storage equipment, computer hardware components, software, semiconductors and internet.

Company	Year established in Israel	No. of employees in Israel	Major acquisitions in Israel
IBM	1949	2,000	Ubique, I-Logix, XIV, Guardium, Diligent Technologies, Storwize, Worklight, Trusteer, EZSource Cloudigo
Motorola	1964	1,500	Terayon, Bitband
Intel	1974	9,200	DSPC Envara, Comsys, InVision Biometrics, Telmap Mobileye, Moovit, Habana Labs
Microsoft	1989	750	Maximal, Peach Networks, Whale Communications, Gteko, YaData, 3DV Systems Secure Islands N-Trig
Applied Materials	1991	1,200	Orbot Instruments, Opal Technologies, Oramir Semiconductor
Qualcomm	1993	450	EPOS (ultrasound positioning), DesignArt Networks (femtocell), iSkoot, Wilocity (WiGig), CSR/Zoran Israel imaging unit; also invested in multiple Israeli startups via Qualcomm Ventures
Cisco Systems	1997	1,500	CLASS Data Systems, HyNEX, Seagull Semiconductor, PentaCom, P-Cube, Riverhead Networks, Intucell, Sheer Networks, NDS Group
Hewlett-Packard	1998	6,000	Indigo Digital Press, Scitex Vision, Nur Macroprints, Mercury Interactive, Shunra
SAP AG	1998	800	OFEK-Tech, TopTier Software, TopManage, A2i, Gigya
Alcatel Lucent	1998	250	LANNET, Chromatis Networks, Mobilitec
GE Healthcare	1998	400	Nuclear and MR businesses of Elscint, Diasonics Vingmed
BMC Software	1999	450	New Dimension Software, Identify Software
CA Technologies	1999	300	Security-7, Abirnet, XOSoft, Oblicore, Nolio
Philips Electronics	1999	700	Elscint, Veon, CDP Medical
Broadcom	2000	500	VisionTech, M-Stream, Siliquent Technologies, Dune Networks, Percello, Provigent, SC Square
Marvell Technology Group	2000	1,600	Galileo Technology
Siemens	2000	900	eship-4u, Tecnomatix Technologies, Solel Solar Systems
EMC Corporation	2004	1,000	Kashya, nLayers, proActivity, Illuminator, ZettaPoint, Cyota, XtremIO
eBay	2005	400	Shopping.com, Fraud Sciences, The Gift Project, SalesPredict, Corrigon Ltd.
SanDisk	2006	650	M-Systems
Google	2006	600	LabPixies, Quiksee, modu (patents only), Waze SlickLogin
Red Hat	2008	200	Qumranet
VMware	2008	200	B-Hive networks, nlayers, Digital Fuel, Wanova
Micron Technology	2010	1,300	Acquired Numonyx, a joint venture by Intel Corporation and STMicroelectronics
Klarna	2011	40	Analyzd
Apple Inc.	2012	450	Anobit, PrimeSense LinX Computational Imaging Ltd
Covidien	2012	1,200	Oridion Systems, superDimension, PolyTouch
Facebook	2013	110	Onavo, Pebbles Interfaces
Amazon	2014	150	Annapurna Labs
Kuang-Chi	2016	120	Agent Vi, Beyond Verbal, eyeSight Technologies
Alibaba	2017	100	Infinity, Twiggle

== Global rankings ==
The following global region rankings are a ranking of the Tel Aviv area, based on a 2024 study by Dutch research firm, Dealroom.

Topic in 2023	Gross world ranking	Per capita world ranking
VC investment	9	5
Number of Unicorns	3	2
Start up scaling	1	NA
% of VC-backed startups that become unicorn	1	1
Number of unicorns per billion VC invested since 2019	1	1
Number of Decacorns per startup	3	NA
% first time funding from EMEA	3	NA
% of VC backed funding from EMEA	1	NA
VC investment in Cybersecurity	2	NA
VC investment in Generative Artificial intelligence	4	NA
VC investment in Autonomous technology	4	NA

== See also ==
- Download Valley
- Economy of Israel
- Israel Innovation Authority
- List of Israeli companies quoted on the Nasdaq
- List of multinationals with research and development centres in Israel
- List of technology centers
- Made in JLM
- Science and technology in Israel
- Start-up Nation: The Story of Israel's Economic Miracle
- Startup Village, Yokneam
- Yozma
