= Anat Bremler-Barr =

Israeli computer scientist (born 1972)

- ענת ברמלר-בר
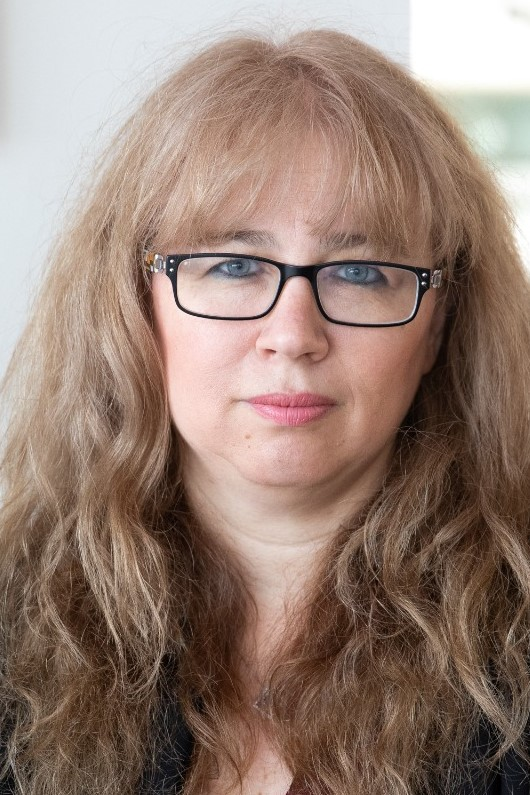
- Born: 1972
- Education: Tel Aviv University
- Scientific career
- Fields: network security, networking
- Workplaces: Tel Aviv University
- Thesis: Algorithms for efficient and reliable routing in the internet (2002)
- Doctoral advisor: Yehuda Afek
- Website: faculty.idc.ac.il/bremler/

Anat Bremler-Barr (Hebrew: ענת ברמלר-בר), is an Israeli computer scientist. She is a professor at Tel Aviv University who is known for her contributions in network security, specifically in Denial of Service attacks and scalable protection of Internet of Things (IoT) devices.

== Education and career ==
Bremler-Barr holds B.Sc. degrees in mathematics and computer science (1994), an LL.B degree in law (1999), and M.Sc. (1997), and Ph.D. degree in computer science (2002), all from Tel Aviv University.

In 2001, Bremler-Barr co-founded Riverhead Networks, a company that developed an innovative system for the mitigation of Denial of Service attacks, where she served as a chief scientist. Riverhead was acquired by Cisco Systems in 2004. She joined Reichman University in 2003, and was promoted to professor in 2020 and, from 2019 until 2021 she served as the deputy dean of the Efi Arazi School of Computer Science. In 2023 she moved to Tel Aviv University where she is a full professor.

== Research ==
Bremler-Barr is known for her work on network security and improving the reliability of the internet. She has worked on preventing cyberattacks. In 2020, Bremler-Barr worked with Yehuda Afek and Lior Shafir to block the NXNSAttack that exploited a vulnerability in Domain Name Systems.

== Select publications ==
- Bremler-Barr, A.; Levy, H. (2005). "Spoofing prevention method". Proceedings IEEE 24th Annual Joint Conference of the IEEE Computer and Communications Societies. Vol. 1. pp. 536–547 vol. 1. doi:10.1109/INFCOM.2005.1497921. ISBN 0-7803-8968-9. S2CID 5566389.
- Bremler-Barr, Anat; Harchol, Yotam; Hay, David (2016-08-22). "OpenBox". Proceedings of the 2016 ACM SIGCOMM Conference. Florianopolis Brazil: ACM. pp. 511–524. doi:10.1145/2934872.2934875. ISBN 978-1-4503-4193-6. S2CID 18859281.
- Bremler-Barr, Anat; Harchol, Yotam; Hay, David; Koral, Yaron (2014-12-02). "Deep Packet Inspection as a Service". Proceedings of the 10th ACM International on Conference on emerging Networking Experiments and Technologies. Sydney Australia: ACM. pp. 271–282. doi:10.1145/2674005.2674984. ISBN 978-1-4503-3279-8. S2CID 3356322.
