= History of IBM research in Israel =

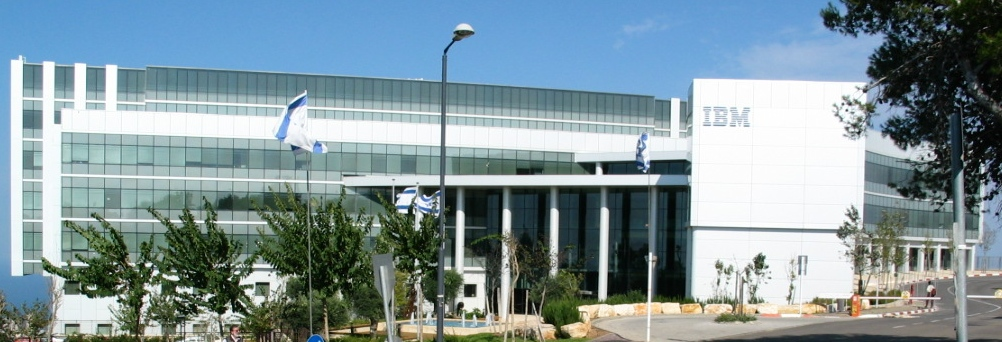
IBM Haifa Labs in 2005

The history of IBM research in Israel dates from 1972 with the establishment of the IBM Haifa Research Lab. The research lab is located in a custom-built complex on the University of Haifa campus, with branches in Haifa and Tel Aviv. The staff at the IBM Haifa Research Lab works on projects connected to the topics of healthcare, cloud computing, formal and image and video analytics among others.

== Overview ==
At the IBM Haifa Research Lab, 25% of the technical staff have doctoral degrees in computer science, electrical engineering, mathematics, or related fields. Employees are actively involved in teaching at Israeli higher education institutions such as the Technion (Israel Institute of Technology) and supervising post-graduate theses. Many employees have received IBM awards for achievements and excellence.

Over the years, the IBM Haifa Research Lab in Israel described itself as attempting to strike a delicate balance between applied (relatively short-term) and long-term industrial research. While contributing to product development on many levels, the Lab also maintains close ties to the academic world. The Lab aims to simultaneously meet the needs of the present day while helping shape the future of information technology.

Since its establishment in 1972, the IBM Haifa Research Lab described itself as trying to be responsive to both the research goals of IBM and the specific needs of Israeli industry – from medical non-invasive diagnosis projects, to computer-controlled irrigation, scheduling El Al flight crews, and Hebrew voice recognition. Today, its contributions play a role in emerging technologies such as IBM's eLiza project for self-managing computer systems, iSCSI for the IBM TotalStorage IP Storage 200i, the InfiniBand high bandwidth network protocol, Enterprise Storage Systems, and information retrieval engines. In addition, verification tools developed in Haifa are used throughout IBM labs to verify and test software and hardware.

== Beginnings ==
In 1971–73, Dr. Alfred Inselberg (AI) from the IBM Los Angeles Scientific Center was on sabbatical leave at the Technion's new department of Applied Mathematics. In 1972, Shimon Yagil contacted AI explaining that IBM Israel was looking for ways to increase IBM's presence in Israel. He asked AI to make presentations on IBM's Scientific Centers and write a proposal for such a Scientific Center in Israel. David Cohen, general manager of IBM Israel, and others attended the presentations and enthusiastically endorsed the proposal which eventually IBM World Trade accepted. This was the genesis of the idea. Prof. Phillip Rabinowich lobbied for IBM's center to be at the Weizmann Institute. However, the Scientific center was established at the Technion, as promoted by Shimon and AI, so that the undergraduate and graduate students there will learn about IBM's scientific activities.

The concept of establishing a research center for IBM in Israel was the idea of the late David Cohen, then general manager of IBM Israel, and the late Prof. Josef Raviv, an Israeli computer scientist who headed a research group at the IBM T.J. Watson Research Center in New York City. Raviv was active in the growth of the IBM Haifa Research Lab in Israel.

In 1971, Raviv spent a year on sabbatical in Israel, where he met with Cohen. They convinced IBM management to open a center in Israel, modeled after the Scientific Centers in the United States, England, Germany, France and Italy. These centers described themselves as non-profit organizations whose goals were to promote the development of computer science and utilize advanced technology to solve problems critical to the local community. Raviv, Cohen and IBM said that with its international reputation for scientific research, a pool of talented researchers, and the support of advanced research institutions, Israel offered an attractive environment for research and development operations. This was a groundbreaking step. At the time, beyond the military industry, the field of hi-tech seemed to be almost non-existent in Israel, and computing appeared to be just starting to gain momentum in academic institutions.

In 1972, the IBM Israel Scientific Center opened its doors in the Computer Science Building of the Technion, with a handful of employees: Raviv as manager, three researchers, and one programmer.

== Joint Ventures across the Oceans ==
In the late 1970s, Raviv began searching for ways to expand the Scientific Center's activities. He approached other Scientific Centers in Europe about conducting joint research projects. One of these was a project in farm management, in collaboration with the Madrid Scientific Center. This allowed the Haifa team to buy their first computer. It was a 5110—a portable computer roughly the size of a suitcase. The research team implemented algorithms on this machine and carried it from one kibbutz (collective farm) to another, to solve their individual irrigation problems.

An important project was the development of an ultrasound system for the early detection of liver cancer, in conjunction with IBM Austria and Israel's Sheba Hospital. Although today ultrasound equipment is routinely used in a wide range of medical applications, at the time it was a relatively new technology. Haifa's expertise in signal processing was key to the development of this project.

Another important project appears to have been computer assisted medical diagnosis – a computer-based system to aid physicians in their diagnostic and treatment decisions in different medical fields. The project, headed by Bezalel Gavish, developed new artificial intelligence methods (production systems). The first area tested was endocrinology and infertility done in cooperation with the Sheba medical center, Tel hashomer. The project was later tested with a group at the Rotschild hospital in Haifa, Dutch Hospitals in the Netherlands. It was extended to other fields of endoctinology, to Congenital malformation, and to heart related issues.

Due to collaborative projects such as these, the Scientific Center quickly became recognized as a focal point for research and development in engineering and scientific computing for IBM's European Scientific Centers. This facilitated the growth of the Center from fifteen to twenty-two employees. To accommodate its expansion, the Scientific Center moved to newer and larger premises in the Technion's Andre and Bella Meyer Advanced Technology Center in 1982.

== Research group opens in Haifa ==
Raviv was still considering ways to expand the Center. As he searched for new avenues for cooperation, he hit on the idea of subcontracting to the IBM Research labs in the United States. He thought that perhaps the labs in the US could use specific skills to solve specific problems, and might be interested in working on a per-project basis.

At the time, this was a radical idea, but as it took shape, Dr. Ralph Gomory, Director of IBM Research, decided to sponsor the concept and created the Haifa Research Group (HRG) in 1982. This new activity began with only two projects—vendor chip testing and DAIOS (DASD I/O simulations)—and grew at an unprecedented rate. These two projects formed a core of activity that eventually led to the creation of the Haifa Research Lab's Verification Technologies and Storage System Technologies departments and to the Haifa Microelectronics Development Lab.

In 1983, the Scientific Center and HRG came together under the roof of the Science and Technology Division of IBM Israel. It became a legal subsidiary of IBM Israel in 1989, which, at the time, was managed by Joshua Maor. Its major research and development projects in the 1980s included Hebrew computational linguistics (including text-to-speech synthesis for the blind), optimization of water distribution systems, computer-based education technology, portrait compression, signal processing for the hearing impaired, document recognition and processing, hand-written and printed text recognition, data compression and parsing techniques, and VLSI design verification, and testing tools.

== IBM as solutions provider ==
During the late 1980s, the emphasis of the Scientific Center's work began to shift. IBM was phasing out its Scientific Centers as computing became more widely used. In Israel, a decision was made to change the focus of the Center's work to benefit IBM Israel by finding solutions for its customers. In 1992, the Israel Scientific Center formally became known as the Advanced Solutions Center of IBM Israel.

In recognition of the value that the Center was bringing to IBM, in 1993, Dr. Jim McGroddy, director of IBM Research, renamed it the IBM Haifa Research Laboratory. At the time, it was one of only three laboratories affiliated with the IBM Research Division outside of the United States, the others being Zurich and Tokyo. At the time, the Center had more than 250 employees; to accommodate its growing staff, HRL moved into Building 8/1 in the MATAM Advanced Technology Center at the southern tip of Haifa, not far from the Carmel Beach.

During the 1990s, HRL's contributions to research and development were reflected in a variety of IBM products, such as the hardware and software for RS/6000 workstations, mathematical elementary functions for several IBM computers, consistent backup of data without interruption to active applications, and design verification of certain IBM products. HRL became the largest Research lab outside the United States.

In 1999, on his 65th birthday, Raviv retired as director of HRL and began to pursue the establishment of an IBM development center in Israel. A few months later, he and his wife, Joanna, were killed in a car crash while on vacation in New Zealand.

The development center planned by Raviv eventually became the Israel Systems and Technology Group (STG) Lab. The activities of the Israel STG Lab include storage technologies, high-speed networks, high-speed circuits, software/ hardware integration, and physical design of VLSI components.

== See also ==
- IBM R&D Labs in Israel
- Science and technology in Israel
