= Matam Junction =

Israeli highway infrastructure

MATAM Junction - צומת מת"מ is a major transportation junction located at the southern entrance to Haifa, in the Matam park area, near Tirat Carmel. The junction is situated at the intersection of Highway 2 (the Coastal Highway) and Highway 4, adjacent to MATAM Hi-Tech Park one of the most important industrial and technological centers in Israel, home to many international and local companies such as Intel, Microsoft, Google, Amazon, and Elbit Systems. The location also serves as a hub for public transportation and demonstrations.

In 2025, a plan was proposed to change the nature of the junction from a mixed-traffic intersection (serving public transport, private vehicles, and pedestrians) to grade-separated bridges dedicated to private vehicle traffic. This plan was harshly criticized by transportation researchers at the Technion due to its potential harm to the regional economy, future residents of the MATAM complex and Tirat Carmel area. In addition, the researchers noted that the move would harm pedestrians, public transport users, and the potential for the area to develop into an urban hub.

== Public Use ==
The junction is accessible via diverse public transportation options, including urban and intercity bus lines. The Haifa Hof HaCarmel train station is located within a short walking distance from the junction, and Metronit lines and other bus routes provide convenient access to the MATAM Park area.

MATAM Junction has served as a focal point for protests and public demonstrations, including demonstrations related to the judicial reform in Israel. During these demonstrations, traffic at the junction was intermittently blocked, causing disruptions in the area.

== Urban and Future Planning ==
Approximately 14,000 housing units are planned to be built in the area, in addition to 12,000 units in Tirat Carmel. In 2025, a plan was announced to replace MATAM Junction, which currently serves mixed traffic of public transport, private vehicles, and pedestrians, with grade-separated bridges dedicated to private vehicle traffic.

Following the announcement, the Transportation Research Laboratory at the Technion strongly criticized the move, stating that "this is a dangerous measure that could severely damage urban development and the transportation vision of the Haifa Metropolitan Area." The researchers also noted that the proposed design is based on outdated transportation planning models and ignores the needs of the city, pedestrians, and cyclists. They further argued that the plan would harm future residents of the neighborhood by increasing dependence on private vehicles and preventing the transformation of the MATAM area into a "vibrant urban hub." According to the article, this plan constitutes a blow to Israel's 2050 goals, which call for the construction of dense, diverse, and accessible cities in response to the country's population growth. The researchers stated that implementing the plan could lead to increased air pollution and cause social and economic harm to the Haifa Metropolitan Area.
