= Matam, Haifa =

High-tech park in Israel

Coordinates: 32°47′19″N 34°57′33″E

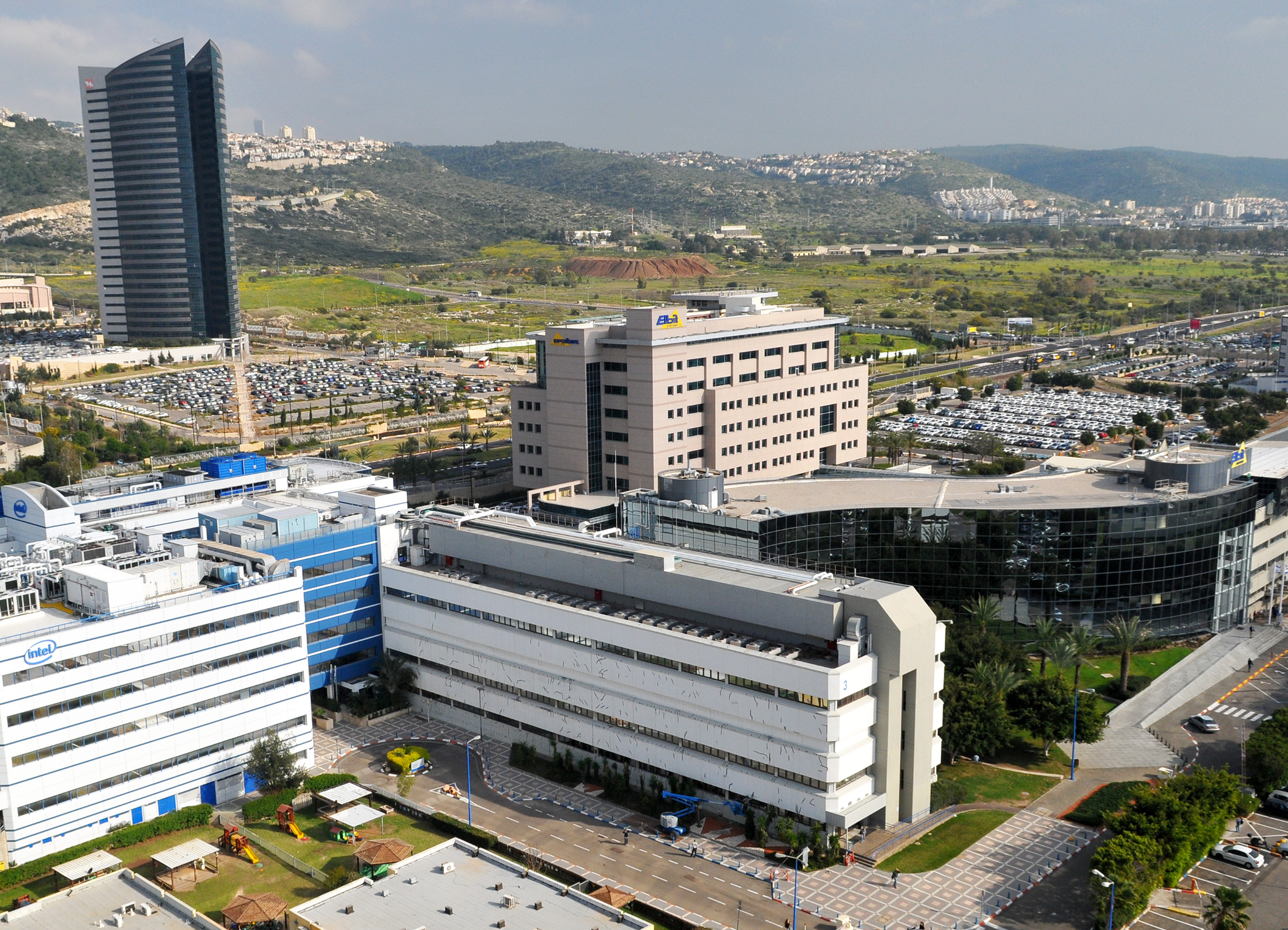
Matam hi-tech park in Haifa

Matam (Hebrew מת"ם - מרכז תעשיות מדע Merkaz Ta'asiyot Mada lit. acronym of Scientific Industries Center), located at the southern entrance to Haifa, is the largest and oldest dedicated hi-tech park in Israel. The Park is an international technology center, with some of the world's leading hi-tech companies maintaining research and development facilities, including Amazon, Intel, Microsoft, Yahoo!, Philips, Google, Qualcomm, CSR, NDS Group, Elbit Systems, Apple, Plus500, Matrix, Aladdin Knowledge Systems, NetManage, ProcessGene, and Neustar.

In the area, 14,000 housing units are planned to be built. In 2025, a proposal was made to construct separated bridges for private vehicle traffic at Matam Junction. The plan was criticized by transportation researchers at the Technion due to its negative impact on the regional economy, future residents of the area, pedestrians, public transport users, and the potential of the complex to become an urban hub.

== Location ==
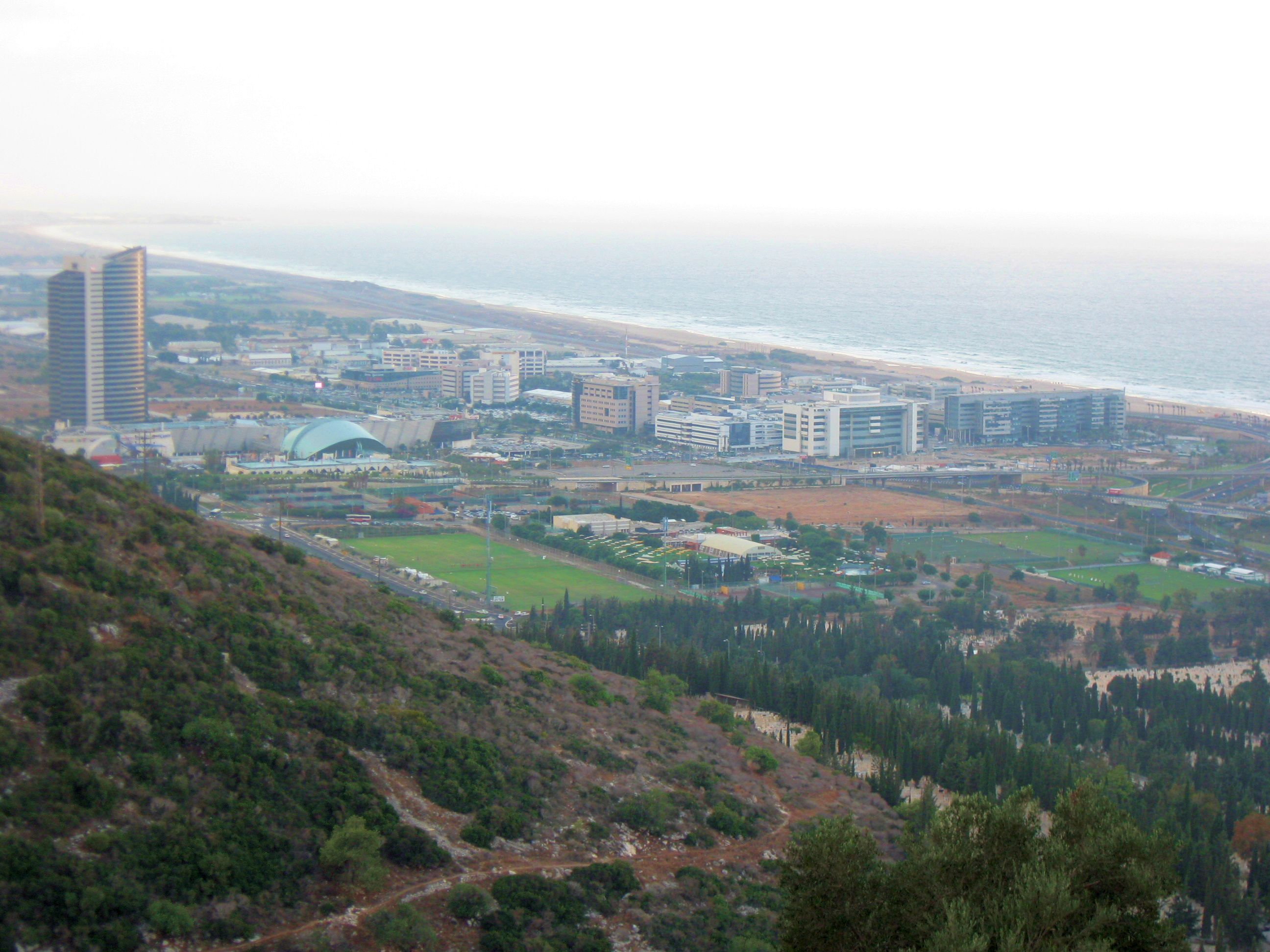
A view of the park from a nearby hill

The park is situated on a main thoroughfare, between highway 2 and highway 4, and near the public transportation hub of the Carmel Beach Railway Station and Central Bus Station. The Carmel Tunnels' west portals, which opened in December 2010, provide easy access by car to the park from areas north and east of Haifa.

== History ==
Matam Park was founded in the 1970s by the Haifa Economic Corporation, and has been gradually expanded ever since. One of the first tenants in the Park was Intel, which set up its Haifa research and development center in 1974, and today has over 5000 employees in Matam. Today the park is 51% owned by Gav-Yam Bayside Land Corporation (TASE:BYSD) and 49% by the Haifa Economic Corporation.

== Future Planning ==
Approximately 14,000 housing units are planned to be built in the area, in addition to 12,000 housing units in Tirat Carmel. In 2025, a plan was announced to replace Matam Junction, which currently accommodates a mix of public transportation, private vehicles, and pedestrian traffic, with grade-separated bridges designed for private vehicle traffic. Following this announcement, the Transportation Research Laboratory at the Technion strongly criticized the move, stating that "this is a dangerous measure that could severely damage urban development and the transportation vision of Haifa Metropolitan Area".

The researchers also noted that the proposed plan is based on outdated transportation planning models and overlooks the needs of the city, pedestrians, and cyclists. They further argued that the plan would harm future residents of the neighborhood by increasing dependence on private vehicles and preventing the creation of a "vibrant urban hub" in the MATAM complex. According to the article, this plan contradicts Israel's 2050 national goals for building dense, diverse, and accessible cities in response to the country's growing population.

The transportation researchers stated that the proposed design would increase air pollution and cause social and economic harm to the Haifa metropolitan area.

== Description ==
Matam Park is a closed campus, covering an area of approximately 220,000 square meters with about 8000 employees. The Park includes buildings covering an area of approximately 270,000 square meters. Future plans for the Park include expansion by an additional 100,000 square meters. A central management and maintenance company provides a variety of services to the occupants, such as central air-conditioning, cafeterias, children day centers, a medical clinic, transport facilities, a post office, a petrol station and car parking areas.

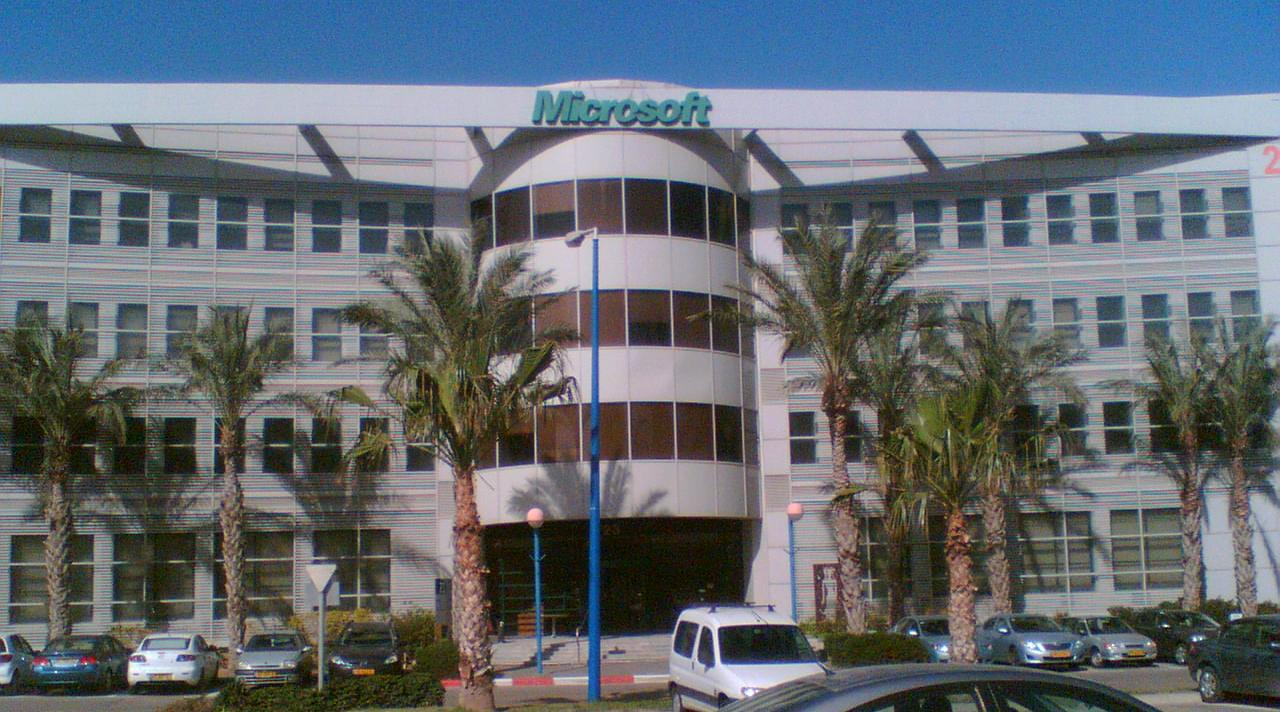
Microsoft House at Matam

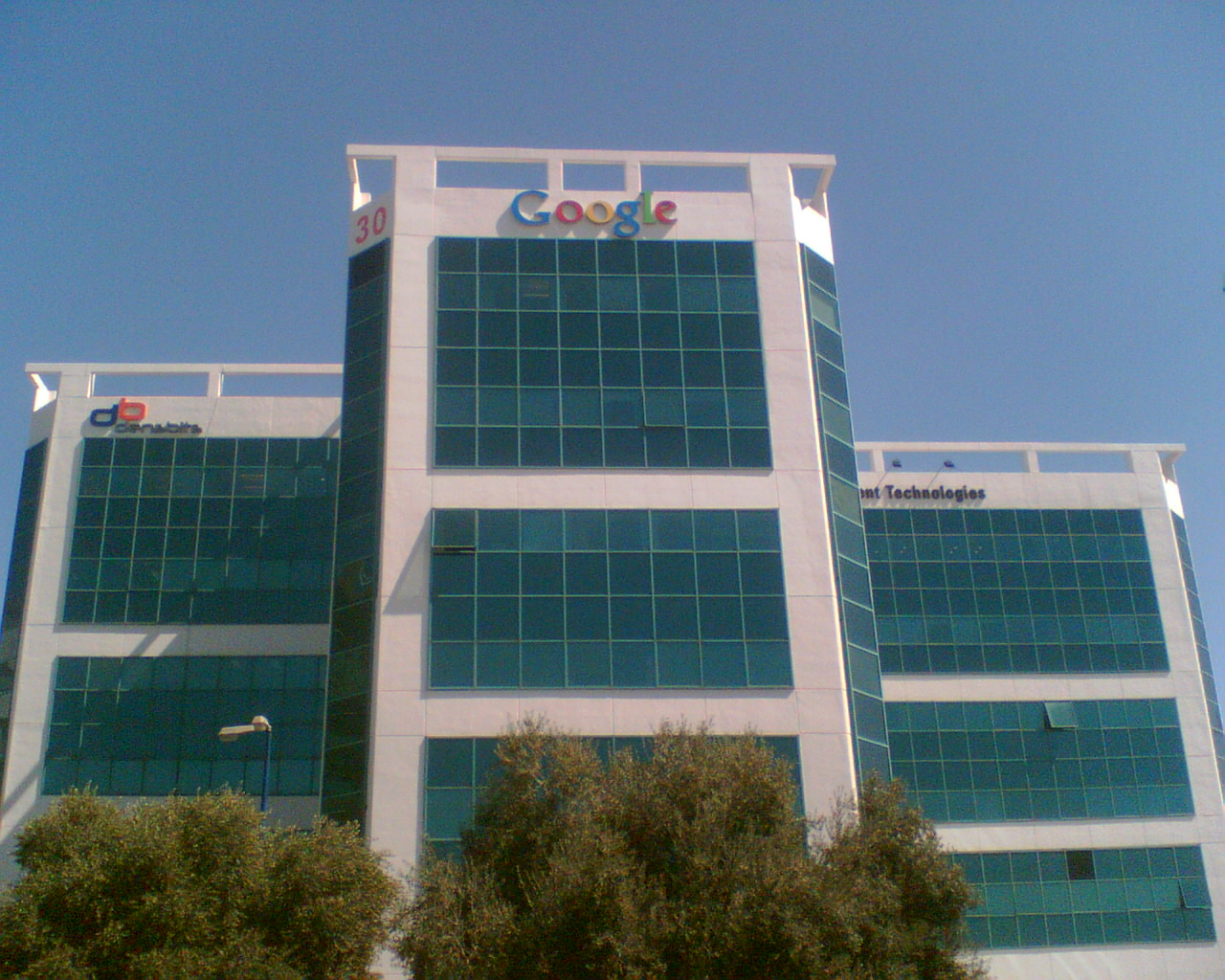
Google development center at Matam

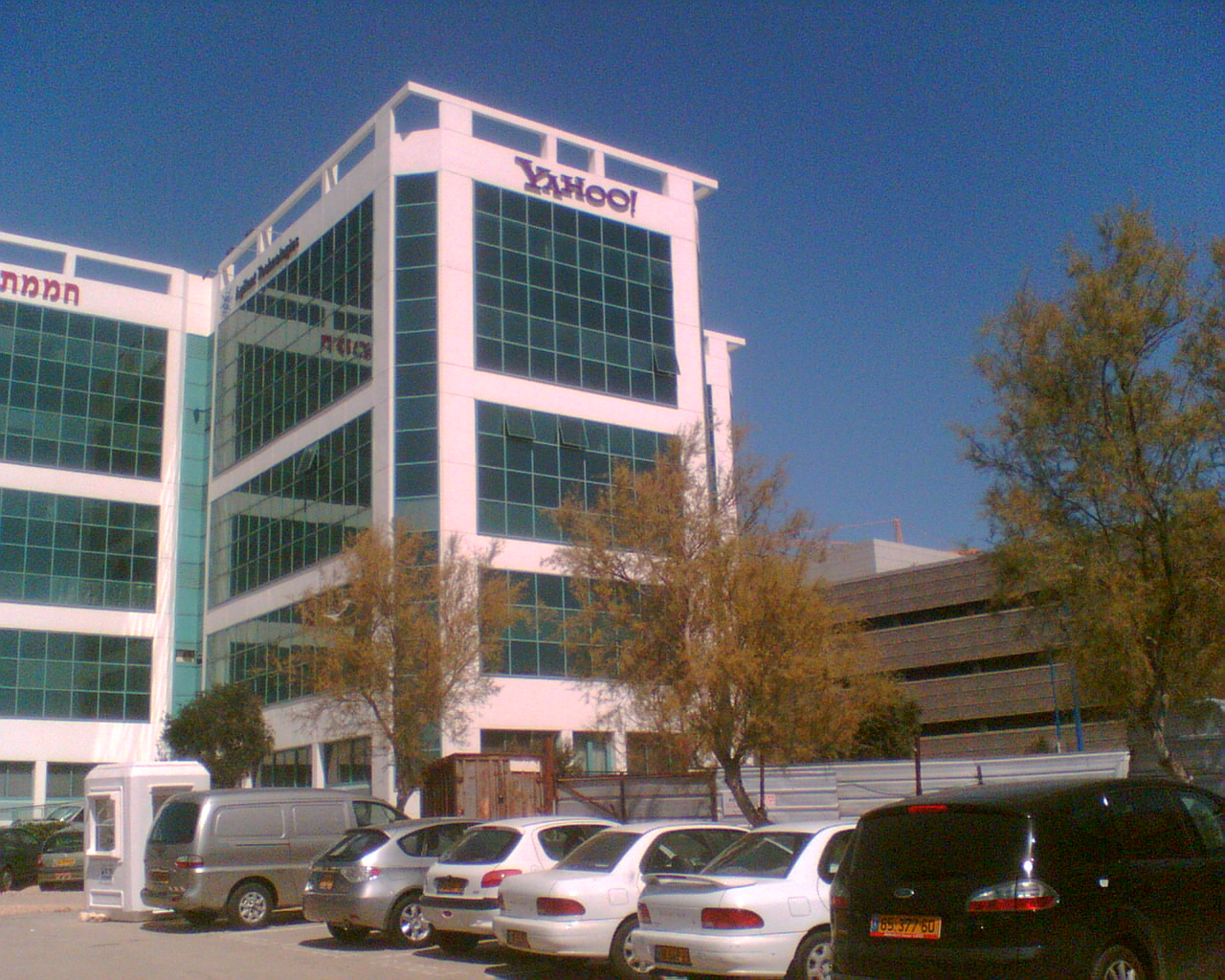
Yahoo! development center at Matam

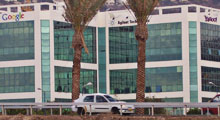
Yahoo! & Google share a building in Matam

== See also ==
- Silicon Wadi
- Jerusalem Technology Park
- Startup Village, Yokneam
- Technion
