= Riverhead Networks =

- Industry: Computer networking
- Founded: 2000
- Founder: Yehuda Afek, Anat Bremler-Barr, Dan Touitou, and Yuval Rachmilevitz
- Defunct: 2004
- Fate: Acquired
- Successor: Cisco Systems
- Headquarters: Tel Aviv, Israel; Cupertino, California
- Products: Network Security
- Number of employees: 120
- Website: rivirhead.com at the Wayback Machine (archived 2004-01-02)

Riverhead Networks was a computer security company based in Netanya, Israel and Cupertino, California. The company was acquired by Cisco Systems on March 22, 2004.

== History ==
Riverhead Networks was founded by Yehuda Afek, Anat Bremler-Barr, Dan Touitou, and Yuval Rachmilevitz in 2000 in Tel Aviv, Israel. Initial funding was provided by Gemini Israel Funds, KUR ventures, and Intel Investment. On March 22, 2004 Cisco Systems paid $44 million to acquire full control of the company ($5 million of which were Cisco's own round B invested money). Following the acquisition by Cisco the company's development center was relocated and merged with the existing Cisco Israel Development Center in Netanya

== Technology ==
Riverhead Networks provided solutions for Distributed Denial of Service (DDoS) by using a series of complex algorithms to alert and prevent them. Riverhead Networks's technology would allow company's IT systems to continue operating, even in the midst of an unauthorized or DDoS malicious assault.

== See also ==
- Distributed Denial of Service
- Silicon Wadi
