= Wanova =

American software company

Wanova, Inc
- Type: Private
- Industry: Software
- Founded: January 2008; 18 years ago
- Founders: Ilan Kessler, Issy Ben-Shaul
- Fate: Acquired by VMware
- Successor: VMware Mirage
- Headquarters: Campbell
- Area served: Worldwide
- Products: Wanova Mirage
- Parent: VMware
- Website: www.wanova.com

Wanova, Inc, headquartered in San Jose, California, provides software allowing IT organizations to manage, support and protect data on desktop and laptop computers. Wanova's primary product, Wanova Mirage, was designed as an alternative to server-hosted desktop virtualization technologies.

== History ==
Wanova was founded in January 2008 by Ilan Kessler and Issy Ben-Shaul, previously co-founders of Actona Technologies, which was acquired by Cisco in 2004 and became the foundation for Cisco Wide Area Application Services (WAAS). The company received its first round of funding from Greylock Partners, Carmel Ventures and Opus Capital in the sum of $13 million. As of May 22, 2012, Issy Ben-Shaul announced on Wanova Blog that Wanova has become a part of VMware.

== Products ==
As of February 2011, there is one primary product, Wanova Mirage hybrid desktop virtualization software, which has three components: Wanova Mirage Client, Wanova Mirage Server, and Wanova Network Optimization. The Mirage Client is a small MSI that installs on the PC of an end user, and allows the endpoint to become managed by the Mirage Server. The Mirage Server provides tools for creating, managing and deploying a Base Image, which typically consists of an Operating System (OS) and core applications that an administrator wants to manage centrally, such as Microsoft Office or Antivirus. Mirage Server also manages the backup and restore synchronization process. Distributed Desktop Optimization incorporates capabilities such as deduplication and compression that make the product effective over a low bandwidth, high-latency WAN. Once Mirage is installed, IT administrators maintain a complete, bootable desktop instance in the data center. This instance is hardware agnostic, and can be instantiated on both physical hardware or in a virtual machine. No hypervisor is required when the instance is deployed into PC hardware.

== How VMware Mirage Works ==
Mirage logically splits the PC into individual layers that can be independently managed: a Base Image; a layer including user-installed applications and machine information, such as machine ID; and a layer including user data, files and personalization. In this manner, IT can create a single read-only Base Image, typically including an operating system (OS) and the core applications they will manage centrally, such as Microsoft Office and an antivirus solution. This Base Image can be deployed to the locally stored copy of each PC, and then synchronized as a whole with the endpoint. Because of the layering, the Image can be patched, updated, and re-synchronized as needed, without overwriting the user-installed applications or data. These features, combined with the network optimizations, create a number of use cases:

- Single Image Management – IT can manage one primary image and synchronize it with thousands of endpoints
- Hardware Migration – By replacing the Base Image associated with an end user's PC, the user's desktop, including applications, data, and personalization settings, can be migrated to new hardware, including hardware from a different manufacturer. This process can be used as part of a regular hardware migration process, or to quickly replace a lost, stolen or broken PC.
- Remote repair of a damaged application – By ‘Enforcing’ a Base Image, IT can ensure a remote device exactly matches the primary copy in the data center, and repairing OS or core application problems.
- In place migration from Windows XP to Windows 7 – By replacing the Base Image associated with an end user's PC, the user's desktop, including data and personalization settings, can be migrated from Windows XP to Windows 7, over the network and without added infrastructure.

== Differences between VMware Mirage and Virtual Desktop Infrastructure (VDI) ==
Virtual Desktop Infrastructure, or VDI, was initially branded by VMware. The term VDI has enjoyed broader usage, however, and has come to be known as a synonym for server-hosted desktop virtualization, or Hosted Virtual Desktops (Gartner). A typical VDI architecture replaces end users desktops by deploying each desktop on a virtual machine, running on a server in the data center. Users access a view of their desktop via a thin client or other access device, using a vendor-specific protocol. VMware Mirage differs fundamentally from this type of architecture in the following ways:

- No hypervisor required: While Mirage can operate within a Type-1 or Type-2 hypervisor, it is not required. The VMware Mirage client operates as a service within the Windows Operating System (OS).
- Scalability: Because VDI uses centralized servers to handle all processing functions for each desktop, a typical server can support roughly 10–12 users, depending on load. Mirage uses the endpoints for processing, and can consequently scale to a 1500:1 desktop to server ratio.
- Deployment: In most environments, Mirage deployment leverages components an organization already has in place: endpoint PCs, a server, and back-end storage. End users do not change their workflow,
- Network optimizations: Mirage leverages a global single index that enables significant deduplication across all users, reducing network traffic and storage requirements.
- Storage: Because VDI users require synchronous network access to their centralized desktop, performance can be significantly impacted by the type of back end storage. Because Mirage clients run a local instance of the centrally stored desktop, storage is only accessed when synchronization is required. Secondary storage, including lower cost SATA drives, are adequate.

== Known limitations ==
The software is currently compatible only with Windows OS. There is no native offering for other operating systems such as Linux or Mac OS-X. The software may still be used inside virtual machines running a supported Windows OS on such platforms.

== See also ==
- Desktop virtualization
- Virtual Desktop Infrastructure
