= Oramir =

Oramir Semiconductor Equipment
- Type: Private company
- Industry: Semiconductors
- Founded: 1992
- Founders: Fairchild Corporation, Teuza Venture Capital Fund and Rafael Development Corporation
- Defunct: 2001
- Fate: Acquired
- Successor: Applied Materials
- Headquarters: Yokneam Illit, Israel
- Products: Semiconductor wafer laser cleaning
- Number of employees: 27 (2001)

Oramir Semiconductor Equipment Ltd. was an Israeli company that developed advanced laser cleaning technologies for semiconductor wafers, used during their manufacturing process. Oramir was located in Rehovot, Israel and was acquired by American semiconductor company Applied Materials.

== History ==
Oramir was founded in 1992 by Fairchild Corporation, Teuza Venture Capital Fund and Rafael Development Corporation of Israel. Oramir was named after Amir Sinai who was killed in service as an IDF special unit NCO in July 1984, during the war in Lebanon. Dan Sinai, Amir's father, was one of Oramir's founders.

Oramir's notability derives from developing the advanced technology for cleaning silicon wafers in a one step dry process. Particles and other contaminants can be removed from a silicon substrate by a patented laser based technology. Applied Materials Inc. (NASDAQ: AMAT), a semiconductor equipment manufacturer, acquired Oramir for $21 million on June 27, 2001.

== See also ==
- Applied Materials Inc.
- Silicon Wadi
