= Mobilitec =

Mobilitec, Inc.
- Type: Private; acquired by public company
- Industry: Wireless & Telecommunications
- Founded: Haifa, Israel (2000)
- Headquarters: San Mateo, California, USA
- Products: Mobilitec mPower 5.0
- Number of employees: 75 (2005)
- Website: www.mobilitec.com

Mobilitec, Inc. is a private software company headquartered in San Mateo, California. The company was acquired by Alcatel Lucent in 2006.

== History ==
Founded in 2000 by Israeli developers Dr. Ophir Holder (CEO), Yoad Gidron (CTO) and Haim Teichholtz (VP Engineering), the company provides wireless carriers with software platforms for management and delivery of mobile content services, including mobile-phone games, ringtones, wallpapers, audio and streaming video.

Its customer-base includes wireless carriers across North America, Europe, and Asia Pacific, such as Vodafone, T-Mobile, Telecom Italia, Orange and Hong Kong Telecom (CSL), to name a few. Mobilitec’s mPower platform was the first product of its kind to be commercially deployed in 2001, and as of 2006, is the most commercially deployed product of its kind in the industry.

In addition to the United States, Mobilitec currently has global offices in Israel (Haifa), Singapore, and the United Kingdom. Most of its engineering organization (R&D, delivery, and technical support) is based in Haifa, Israel, account management and sales at the worldwide offices, and the majority of its management team is based in California.

Among its investors and shareholders prior to its acquisition were AIG, Canaan Partners, Sun Microsystems, Lucent Technologies, Singapore Telecom, and a group of Microsoft executives.

== See also ==
- Silicon Wadi
