= IBM Israel =

Globally integrated enterprise

IBM logo.

IBM is a globally integrated enterprise operating in 170 countries. IBM's R&D history in Israel began in 1972 when Professor Josef Raviv established the IBM Israel Scientific Center in the Technion's Computer Science Building in Haifa. As of 2023, over 3000 individuals work at IBM R&D locations across Israel, including Haifa, Tel Aviv, Herzliya, Rehovot, and the Jerusalem Technology Park.

== Haifa Research Lab ==
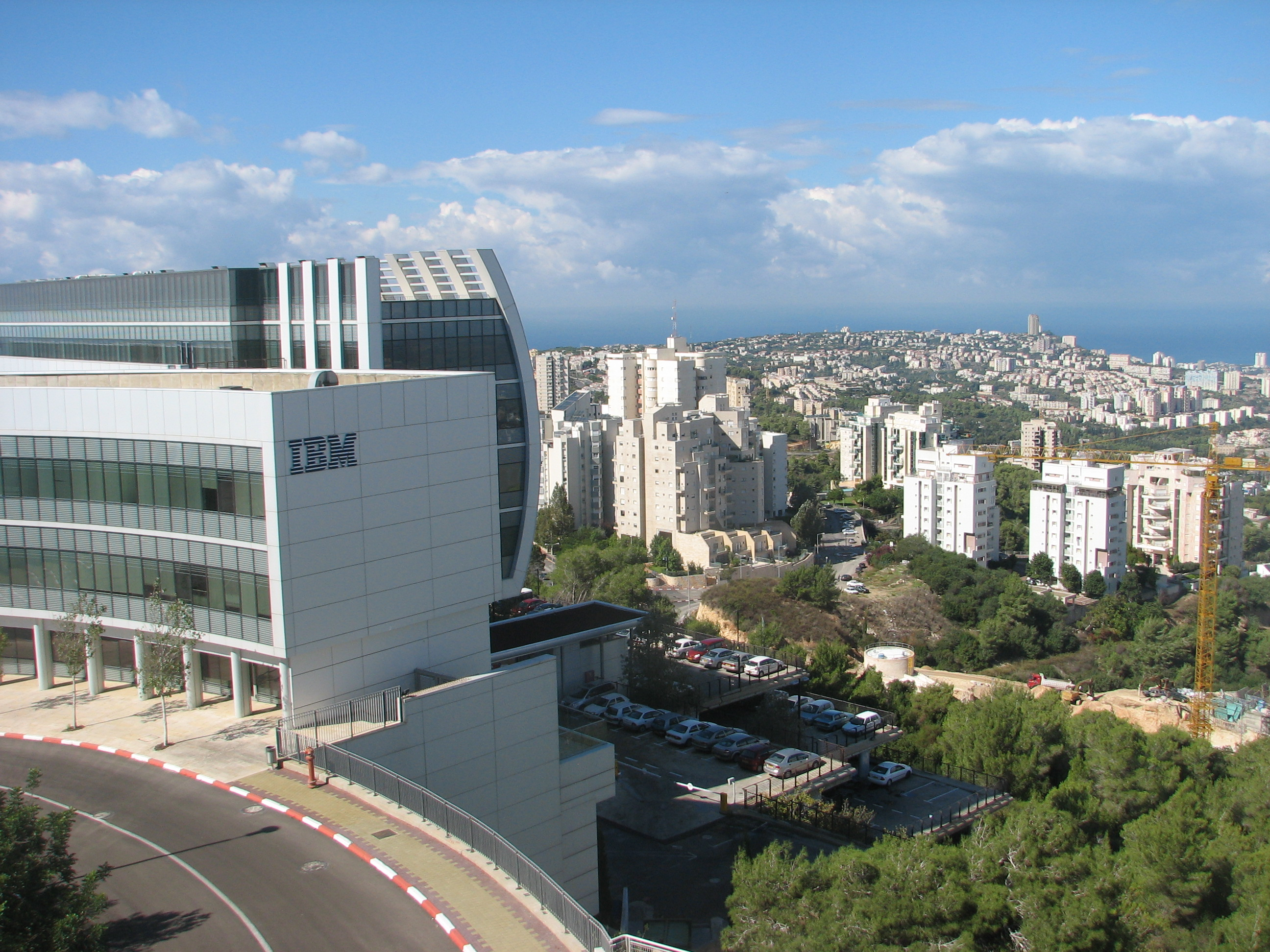
The IBM R&D centre in its Mount Carmel setting in Denia, Haifa, near the University of Haifa.

IBM Haifa Research Laboratory (HRL) is located in Haifa, Israel. It is an IBM R&D Lab in Israel. It handles projects in the spheres of cloud computing, healthcare and life sciences, verification technologies, multimedia, event processing, information retrieval, programming environments, business transformation, and optimization technologies. HRL is the biggest IBM research center outside the US.

Established back in 1972 as the IBM Israel Scientific Center, the IBM Haifa Research Lab has grown from three researchers to over five hundred employees, including regular staff members and many students. The IBM Haifa Research Lab is located in a custom-built complex adjacent to the Haifa University campus, with branches in Haifa and Tel Aviv. Current projects include healthcare, cloud computing, formal and simulation-based verification technologies, programming environments, chip design, storage systems, information retrieval, collaboration, and much more.

At the IBM Haifa Research Lab, twenty-five percent of the technical staff have doctoral degrees in computer science, electrical engineering, mathematics, or related fields. Employees are actively involved in teaching at Israeli higher education institutions such as the Technion (Israel Institute of Technology) and supervising post-graduate theses. Many employees have received IBM awards for achievements and excellence.

== Systems and Technology Group Lab ==
STG incorporates the former Haifa Development Lab and develops advanced technologies for IBM's Systems and Technology Group. The STG Lab in Israel is involved in three major activities: storage technology, de-duplication software, and chip design. Working closely with the Israeli hi-tech community and recent IBM acquisitions in Israel, the STG Lab serves as a focal point for building a storage ecosystem in Israel. The lab also works closely with the XIV team in IBM. Its three main departments are Hardware Development, Storage Systems Development, and Diligent Technologies.

== Israel Software Lab ==
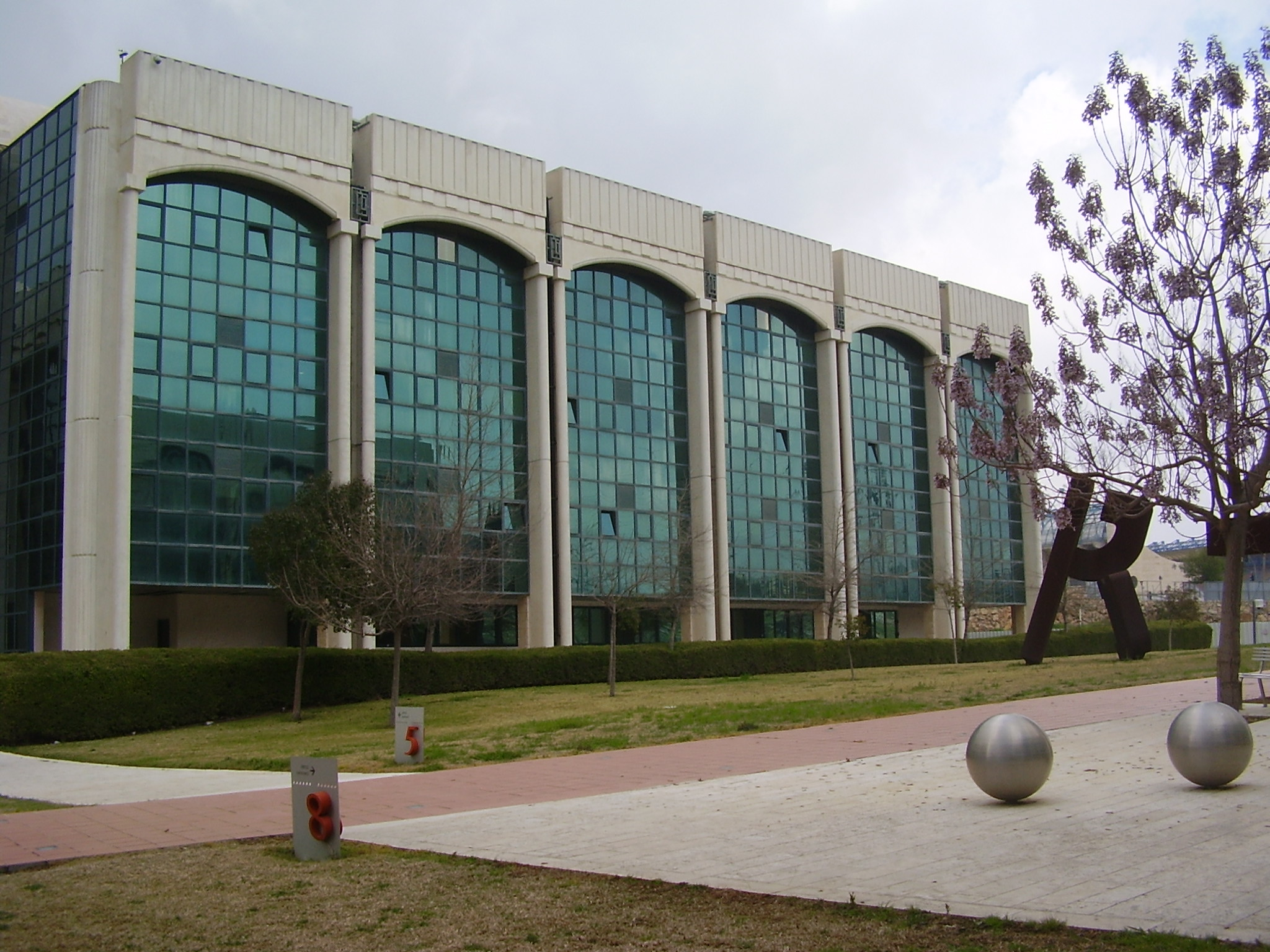
IBM Israel Software Lab in the Jerusalem Technology Park

ILSL develops software for real-time collaboration, content discovery and text analytics, metadata management, application security, and SOA. The teams work closely with the Lotus, Information Management, Rational, and WebSphere brands in IBM's Software Group.

== List of Israeli companies acquired by IBM ==
In recent years IBM acquired over a dozen Israeli technology companies, which have been subsequently incorporate into IBM R&D Labs in Israel, they include:

Company	Description	Acquisition Date	Value (USD)
Ubique	Developer of instant messaging and collaboration products, its functions integrated into IBM Lotus Sametime product	May 19, 1998	
iPhrase Systems	US-based iPhrase had an R&D center in Jerusalem with 30 employees. The US company acquired its activity in Israel when it merged with Banter Systems, a start-up that developed software for automated classification of texts.	November 1, 2005	
Unicorn Solutions	Developer of software for metadata management, The company’s product provides metadata repository, ontology modeling, semantic mapping, Active Design services, and federated business querying services.	May 5, 2006	$10 million
WatchFire	US-based flagship product AppScan, was developed by Sanctum, an Israeli company acquired by WatchFire in 2004. AppScan is a solution for integrate application security, now renamed IBM Rational AppScan	July 20, 2007	
I-Logix	Developer of collaborative Model driven development (MDD) solutions, acquired by IBM via the acquisition of Telelogic. Its flagship products now renamed IBM Rational Rhapsody and IBM Rational Statemate	April 3, 2008	
XIV	High-end disk storage products now renamed IBM XIV Storage System	January 2, 2008	
FileX	Disk-based backup and recovery solutions	April 10, 2008	
Diligent Technologies	Data De-duplication	April 18, 2008	$200 million
Guardium	Provider of real-time database security and monitoring solutions to safeguard enterprise data and address regulatory compliance requirements.	November 30, 2009	$225 million
Storwize	Provider of data compression solutions, now known as IBM Storwize	July 29, 2010	$140 million
Worklight	Mobile application development platform	January 31, 2012	$70 million
CSL International	virtualization management technology for IBM's zEnterprise system	July 9, 2013	$10 million
Trusteer	Endpoint cybercrime prevention	September 3, 2013	$630 million
EZSource	Application discovery and dashboard visualization	June 1, 2016	Not disclosed

== See also ==
- History of IBM research in Israel
- List of multinational companies with research and development centres in Israel
