= Yehuda Afek =

Israeli computer scientist

- יהודה אפק
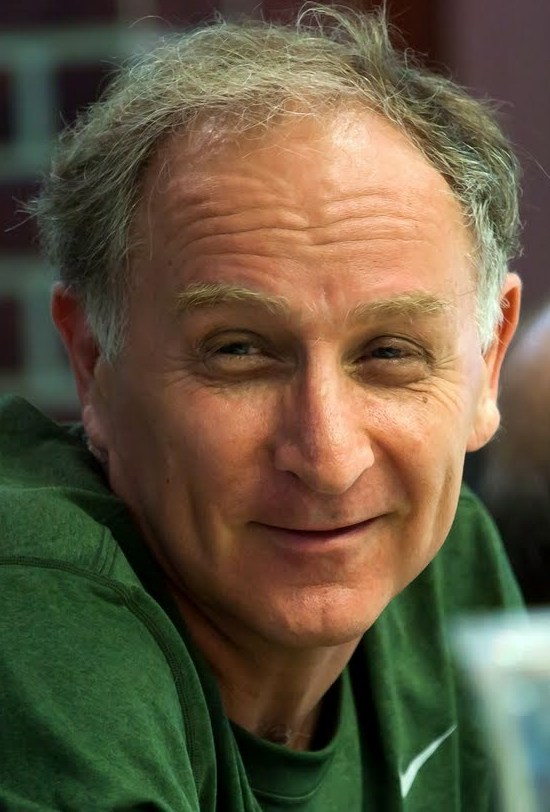
- Born: 30 September 1952 (age 74); Israel
- Education: Technion, University of California, Los Angeles
- Known for: Mitigation of Denial of Service Attacks, Distributed Computing
- Scientific career
- Fields: Computer Science; Distributed Computing
- Workplaces: Tel Aviv University
- Thesis: Distributed Algorithms for Unidirectional and Complete Networks (1985)
- Doctoral advisor: Eli Gafni; Leonard Kleinrock
- Website: www.cs.tau.ac.il/~afek/

Yehuda Afek (Hebrew: יהודה אפק; September 1952) is an Israeli computer scientist at Tel Aviv University and is known for his work on network cyber security and fault tolerant distributed computing. Yehuda cofounded Riverhead Networks in 2000 and was the head of the School of Computer Science in Tel Aviv University in 2014–2016.

== Biography ==
Afek was born in Haifa in 1952 to Holocaust survivor parents (Miriam and Menachem Pinkhof) who were among the founders of the Dutch underground Westerweel Group who saved over 300 Jewish youths during the Holocaust until they were captured by the Nazis. They both received the Jewish holocaust rescuer Medal. Afek studied at the Hebrew Reali School in Haifa, and in 1970 enlisted in the IDF where he served as a fighter in a special elite operations unit (Sayeret Matkal), a service that was extended due to the Yom Kippur War. In 1978 he earned a bachelor's degree in electrical engineering at the Technion. In 1978-1980 he worked as an IDF civilian engineer, developing the avionics unit and autopilot of the first successful UAV manufactured by the Israeli Air Force. In 1980-1985 he earned an MSc and PhD respectively, in computer science from the University of California, Los Angeles (UCLA). From 1985 to 1988, he worked as a researcher at AT&T's Bell Laboratories. In 1988 he joined the faculty in the Department of Computer Science at Tel Aviv University, where he is currently a full professor. He also served as head of the School of Computer Science from 2014 to 2016.

In 2000 Afek was the lead founder of Riverhead Networks, a company that provided a mitigation system to distributed denial of service attacks. The Riverhead Guard product was deployed to tens of thousands of sites, protecting them from multi Gbps attacks. Riverhead was acquired by Cisco Systems in 2004, after which Afek remained CTO and director in Cisco Israel until May 2009.
