= P-Cube =

P-Cube Ltd.
- Type: Subsidiary
- Industry: Computer networking
- Founded: 1999
- Founder: Yuval Shahar, Benny Shnaider, Giora Yaron
- Defunct: 2004
- Fate: Acquired by Cisco
- Headquarters: Sunnyvale, California; Tel Aviv, Israel
- Products: Service delivery platform
- Website: www.p-cube.com

P-Cube was a service delivery platform company based in the United States, with R&D facilities in Herzliya, Israel. It was acquired by Cisco Systems on August 23, 2004. Cisco announced an end of sale of the lower end platforms of the product (now renamed the Service Control Engine or SCE) in October 2012. Further development of the SCE platform continues and replacements are available from Cisco Systems.

== History ==
P-Cube was founded in 1999 by three Israeli technology entrepreneurs. Yuval Shahar was the company's CEO and previously served as a development manager for VocalTec (Nasdaq:VOCL). Benny Shnaider, was previously a co-founder of Pentacom, which was also acquired by Cisco in April 2004 for $118 million. The third founder, who was P-Cube's President, Giora Yaron, was previously president of Indigo NV (Nasdaq: INDG), and general manager of Tower Semiconductor (Nasdaq: TSEM).

The idea for founding P-Cube came as a result of examining ways to improve Internet service providers' profitability. P-Cube offered them the ability to provide additional services for a fee, bringing them much needed dollars that help make them more profitable.

P-Cube raised more than $65 million in venture capital funding from: Granite Global, Accel Partners, ComVentures, Evergreen, Sandoz, and Venture TDF Ventures.
