= Economy of Israel =

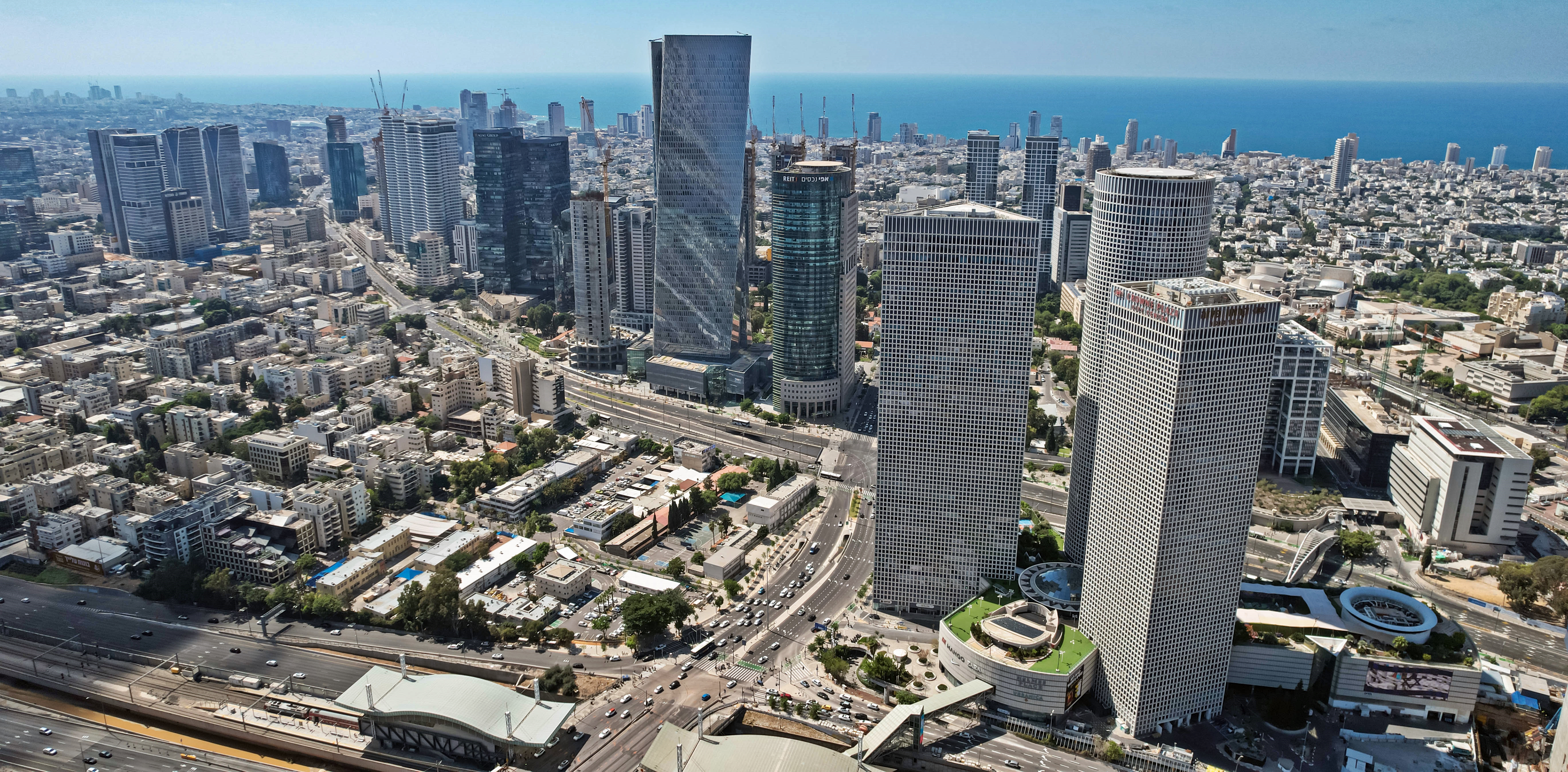
- Tel Aviv is the financial and economic capital of Israel
- Currency: Israeli new shekel (ILS; ₪)
- Fiscal year: Calendar year
- Trade organisations: AIIB, EBRD, IADB, ICC, IMF, OECD, WTO and others
- Country group: Advanced economy; High-income economy

Statistics
- Population: ▲10,063,603 (2024)
- GDP: ▲$719.848 billion (nominal, 2026); ▲$609.411 billion (PPP, 2026)
- GDP growth: ▼1.6% (2024); ▲3.1% (2025)
- GDP per capita: ▲$69,804 (nominal, 2026); ▲$59,095 (PPP, 2026)
- GDP by sector: Agriculture: 2.4%; Industry: 26.5%; Services: 69.5%; (2017)
- Inflation (CPI): ▼1.5% (2026)
- Population below national poverty line: 20.9% (2023)
- Gini coefficient: 32.8 medium (2021)
- Human Development Index: 0.919 very high (2023) (25th); 0.813 very high IHDI (2023)
- Labour force: 4,065,500 (May 2020); 59.0% employment rate (May 2020)
- Labour force by occupation: Agriculture: 1.1%; Industry: 17.3%; Services: 81.6%; (2015)
- Unemployment: 3.5% (May 2022); 6.0% youth unemployment (Q1-2020); 143,800 unemployed (May 2022)
- Average gross salary: ₪15,979 / €4,600 / $5,500 monthly (2026)
- Average net salary: ₪12,783 / €3,700 / $4,400 monthly (2026)
- Main industries: High-technology goods and services (including aviation, communications, telecommunications equipment, computer hardware and software, aerospace and defense contracting, medical devices, fiber optics, scientific instruments), pharmaceuticals, potash and phosphates, metallurgy, chemical products, plastics, diamond cutting, financial services, petroleum refining, textiles

External
- Exports: ▼$64 billion (2024)
- Export goods: Cut diamonds, refined petroleum, pharmaceuticals, machinery and equipment, medical instruments, computer hardware and software, agricultural products, chemicals, textiles and apparel.
- Main export partners: United States 26.4%; European Union 22.7%; China 7.19%; Palestinian territories 5.98%; United Kingdom 4.13%; India 3.99%; Turkey 3.03%; (2022)
- Imports: ▼$85.3 billion (2024)
- Import goods: Raw materials, military equipment, motor vehicles, investment goods, rough diamonds, crude petroleum, grain, consumer goods.
- Main import partners: European Union 31.2%; China 13.9%; United States 11.2%; Turkey 6.75%; India 4.69%; Switzerland 3.76%; (2022)
- FDI stock: $28.7 billion (2022 est.; 19th) $82.82 billion (2011 est.)
- Gross external debt: $97.463 billion (July 2019 est.)

Public finance
- Government debt: 68.5% of GDP (2026; 57th)
- Foreign reserves: $204.669 billion (January 2024 est.; 15th)
- Budget balance: −3% of GDP (2011 est.; 105th)
- Revenue: $126.35 billion (2022 est.)
- Spending: $123.73 billion (2022 est.)
- Economic aid: Received-; $4.81 billion; as US foreign aid; Donated-; $0.28 billion; as Israeli foreign aid
- Credit rating: Standard & Poor's: A/A-1; Outlook: Negative; Moody's: Baa1; Outlook: Negative; Fitch: A; Outlook: Negative
- All values, unless otherwise stated, are in US dollars.

Israel has a highly developed free-market economy. As of 2025, Israel has the 24th largest economy in the world by nominal GDP, according to the IMF. Israel maintains the highest average wealth per adult and number of billionaires in the Middle East. Israeli public finances are sensitive to regional armed conflict due to deficit spending related to its large defense budget. An innovation economy, Israel has a highly educated workforce and developed capital markets, as well as an advanced start-up ecosystem.

The country's major economic sectors are technology, industrial manufacturing, and energy. Israel has signed free trade agreements with many world nations. In its early decades, the Israeli economy was largely state-controlled and shaped by social democratic ideas. In the 1970s and 1980s, the economy underwent a series of free-market reforms and was gradually liberalized. Israel has a close foreign trade relationship with the United States spanning both aid and bilateral investment.

== History ==
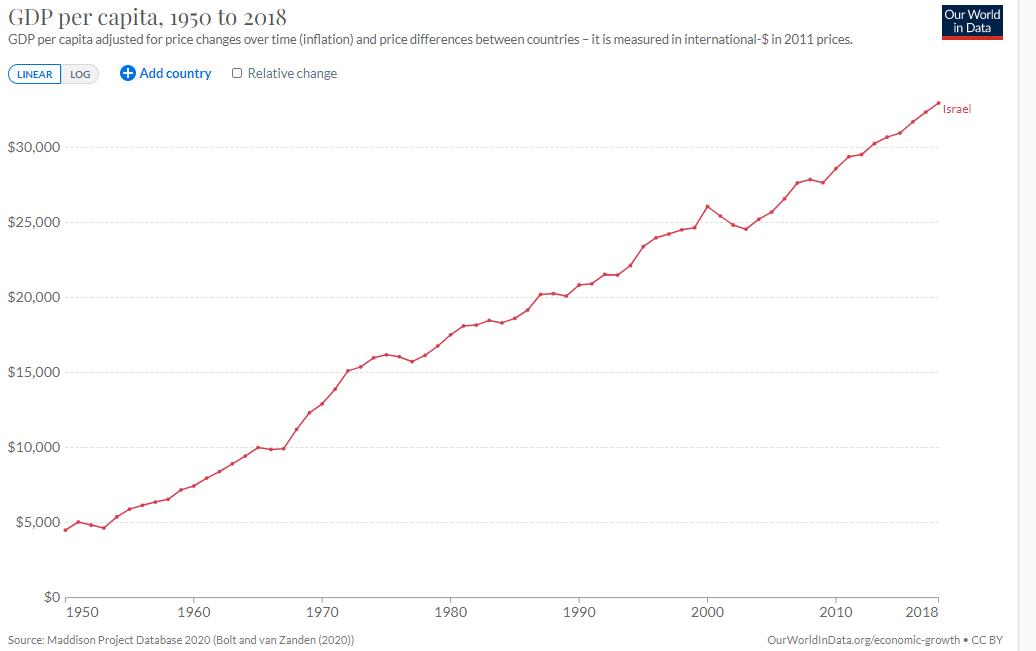
Change in per capita GDP of Israel since 1950. Figures are inflation-adjusted to 2011 international dollars.

The British Mandate for Palestine came into effect in 1920 aimed at restricting land purchases by Jewish immigrants. For this reason, the Jewish population was initially more urban and had a higher share in industrial occupations. This particular development resulted economically in one of the few growth miracles of the region whereby the structure of firms was determined mainly by private businessmen rather than by the government. The first survey of the Dead Sea in 1911, by the Russian Jewish businessman and engineer Moshe Novomeysky, led to the establishment of Palestine Potash Ltd. in 1930, later renamed the Dead Sea Works. In 1923, the businessman and hydraulic engineer Pinhas Rutenberg was granted an exclusive concession for the production and distribution of electric power. He founded the Palestine Electric Company, later the Israel Electric Corporation. Between 1920 and 1924, some of the country's largest factories were established, including the Shemen Oil Company, the Societe des Grand Moulins, the Palestine Silicate Company and the Palestine Salt Company.

In 1937, there were 86 spinning and weaving factories in the country, employing a workforce of 1,500. Capital and technical expertise were supplied by Jewish professionals from Europe. The Ata textile plant in Kiryat Ata, which went on to become an icon of the Israeli textile industry, was established in 1934. In 1939, the cornerstone was laid for one of the kibbutz industry's first factories: the Naaman brick factory, which supplied the growing need for construction materials.

The textile industry underwent rapid development during World War II, when supplies from Europe were cut off while local manufacturers were commissioned for army needs. By 1943, the number of factories had grown to 250, with a workforce of 5,630, and output increased tenfold.

From 1924, trade fairs were held in Tel Aviv. The Levant Fair was inaugurated in 1932.

=== After independence ===
After statehood, Israel faced a deep economic crisis. As well as having to recover from the devastating effects of the 1948 Arab–Israeli War, it also had to absorb hundreds of thousands of Jewish refugees from Europe and almost a million Mizrahi and other Jews from the Arab world. Israel was financially overwhelmed and faced a deep economic crisis, which led to a policy of austerity from 1949 to 1959. Unemployment was high, and foreign currency reserves were scarce.

In 1952, Israel and West Germany signed an agreement stipulating that West Germany was to pay Israel to compensate for Jewish property stolen by the Nazis, material claims during the Holocaust, and absorption of refugees as a result. Over the next 14 years, West Germany paid Israel 3 billion marks (around US$714 million according to 1953–1955 conversion rates or equivalent to approximately US$7 billion in modern currency). The reparations became a decisive part of Israel's income, comprising as high as 87.5% of Israel's income in 1956. Israel never had any formal diplomatic relations with East Germany. In 1950, the Israeli government launched Israel Bonds for American and Canadian Jews to buy. In 1951, the final results of the bonds program exceeded $52 million. Additionally, many American Jews made private donations to Israel, which in 1956 were thought to amount to $100 million a year. In 1957, bond sales amounted to 35% of Israel's special development budget. Israel later received increasing economic aid from the United States, a country that also became an important source of political support internationally.

Israel invested domestic tax dollars, Israel Bonds funds and foreign aid in industrial and agricultural development projects, and slowly became economically self-sufficient. Among the projects made possible by the aid was the Hadera power plant, the Dead Sea Works, the National Water Carrier, port development in Haifa, Ashdod, and Eilat, desalination plants, and national infrastructure projects.

After statehood, priority was given to establishing industries in areas slated for development, among them, Lachish, Ashkelon, the Negev and Galilee. The expansion of Israel's textile industry was a consequence of the development of cotton as a profitable agricultural crop. By the late 1960s, textiles were one of the largest industrial branches in Israel, second only to the foodstuff industry. Textiles constituted about 12% of industrial exports, becoming the second-largest export branch after polished diamonds. In the 1990s, East Asian manufacturers reduced retail prices by hiring less expensive laborers. The lower market prices decreased the profitability of the Israeli textile manufacturers. Much of the work was subcontracted to 400 Israeli Arab sewing shops. As these closed down, Israeli firms, among them Delta, Polgat, Argeman and Kitan, began doing their sewing in Jordan and Egypt, usually under the QIZ arrangement. In the early 2000s, Israeli companies had 30 plants in Jordan. Israeli exports reached $370 million a year, supplying such retailers and designers as Marks & Spencer, The Gap, Victoria's Secret, Walmart, Sears, Ralph Lauren, Calvin Klein, and Donna Karan.

In its first two decades of existence, Israel's strong commitment to development led to economic growth rates that exceeded 10% annually. Between 1950 and 1963, the expenditure among wage-earner's families rose 97% in real terms. Between 1955 and 1966, per capita consumption rose by 221%. In the 1970s, investment began to shift from agriculture and basic infrastructure to industry and defense programs. These latter investments would later become the foundation of Israel's technology sector. The years after the 1973 Yom Kippur War were a lost decade economically, as growth stalled, inflation soared and government expenditures rose significantly, like much of the rest of the world. Also worthy of mention is the 1983 Bank stock crisis. By 1984, the economic situation became almost catastrophic with inflation reaching an annual rate close to 450% and projected to reach over 1000% by the end of the following year. However, the successful economic stabilization plan implemented in 1985 and the subsequent introduction of market-oriented structural reforms reinvigorated the economy and paved the way for its rapid growth in the 1990s and became a model for other countries facing similar economic crises.

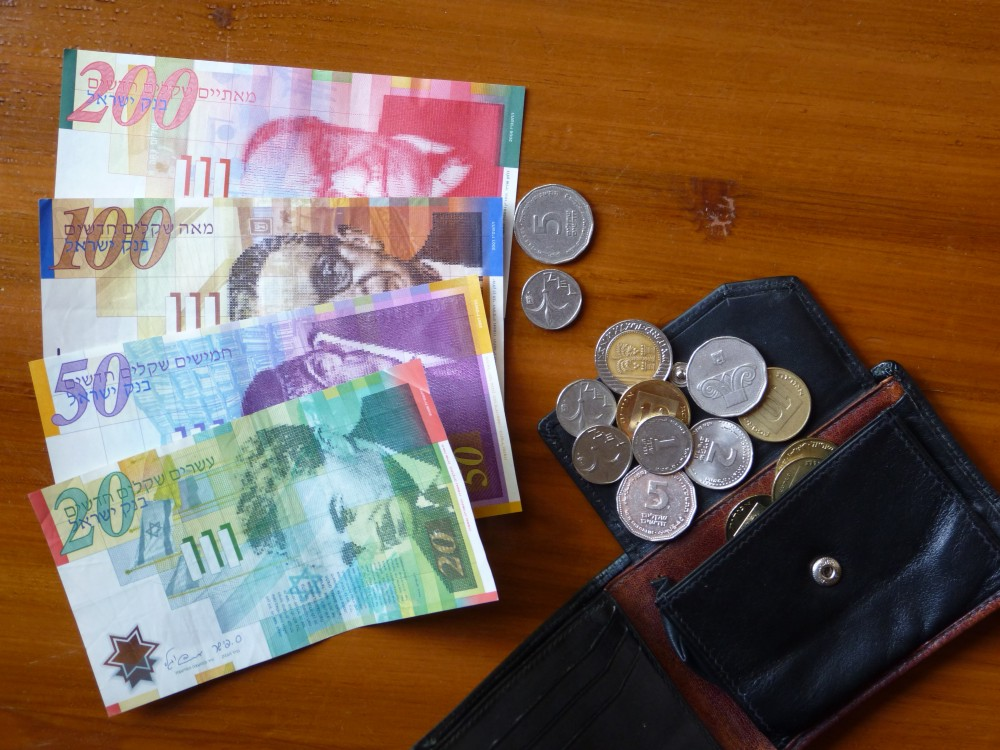
Israeli new shekel banknotes and coins

Two developments have helped to transform Israel's economy since the beginning of the 1990s. The first is waves of Jewish immigration, predominantly from the countries of the former USSR, that has brought over one million new citizens to Israel. These new Soviet Jewish immigrants, many of them highly educated, had a wellspring of scientific and technical expertise, and helped develop Israel's burgeoning technology sector. They now constitute 15% of Israel's population. The second development benefiting the Israeli economy is the peace process that began at the Madrid conference of October 1991 and led to the signing of accords and later a peace treaty between Israel and Jordan (1994).

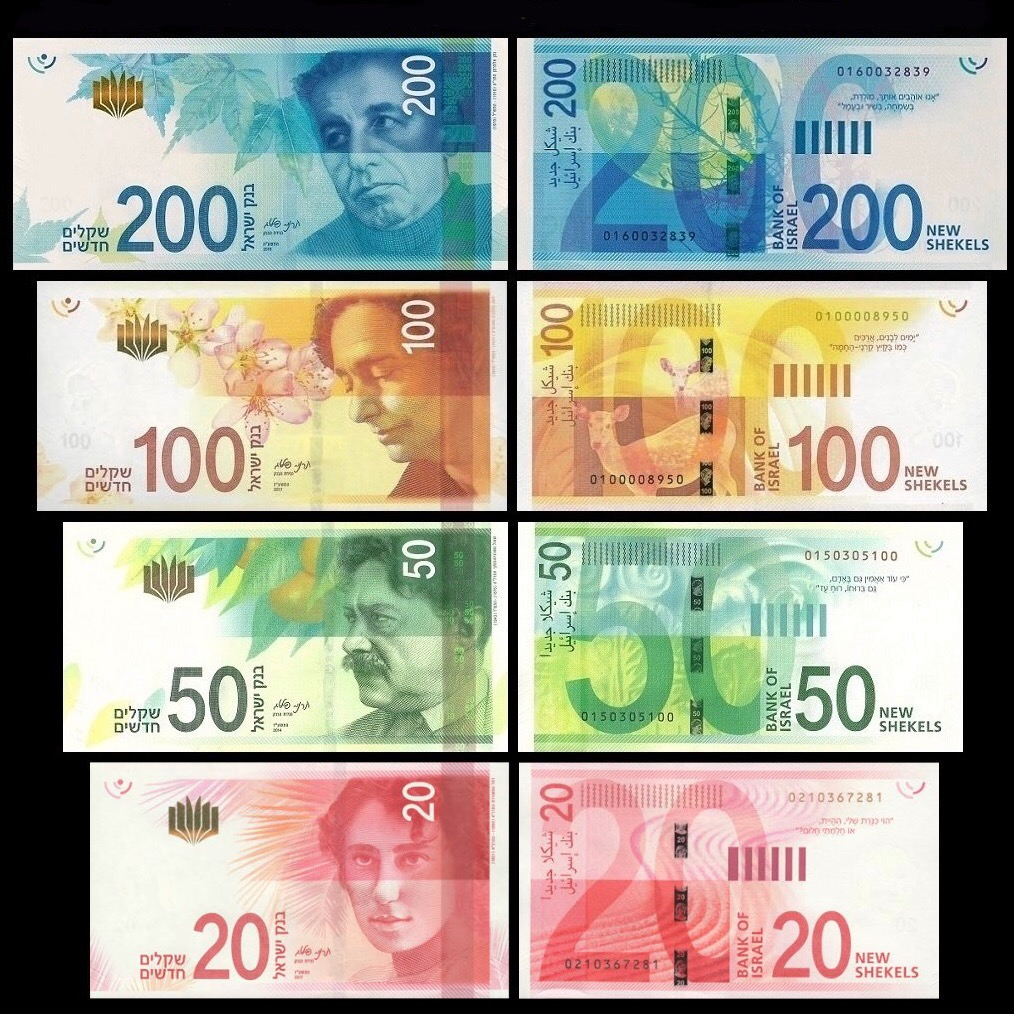
Israeli New Shekel, new banknotes since 2018

During the early 2000s, the Israeli economy slowed due to the global dot-com bubble which bankrupted many startups. The Second Intifada, which cost Israel billions of dollars in security costs, and a decline in investment and tourism, sent unemployment in Israel to the double digits; growth in one quarter of 2000 was 10%. In 2002, the Israeli economy declined about 4% in one quarter. Afterward, Israel managed to create a remarkable recovery by opening up new markets to Israeli exporters farther afield, such as in the rapidly growing countries of East Asia. This was possible thanks to a rebound in the Israeli tech sector, following recovery from the dotcom crash and a growing increase in demand for computer software as rates of global internet usage surged at this time. The explosion in demand for security and defense products following 9/11 also led to Israel selling more of its technologies abroad – a situation only made possible due to Israel's prior investments in the technology sector in an effort to curb high levels of domestic unemployment.

In the 2000s, there was an influx of foreign investment in Israel from companies that formerly shunned the Israeli market. In 2006, foreign investment in Israel was $13 billion, according to the Manufacturers Association of Israel. The Financial Times said that "bombs drop, yet Israel's economy grows". Moreover, while Israel's total gross external debt is US$95 billion, or approximately 41.6% of GDP, since 2001 it has become a net lender nation in terms of net external debt (the total value of assets vs. liabilities in debt instruments owed abroad), which as of June 2012 stood at a significant surplus of US$60 billion. The country also maintains a current account surplus in an amount equivalent to about 3% of its gross domestic product in 2010. In 2023, Israel's account surplus was 25.3 billion U.S. dollars.

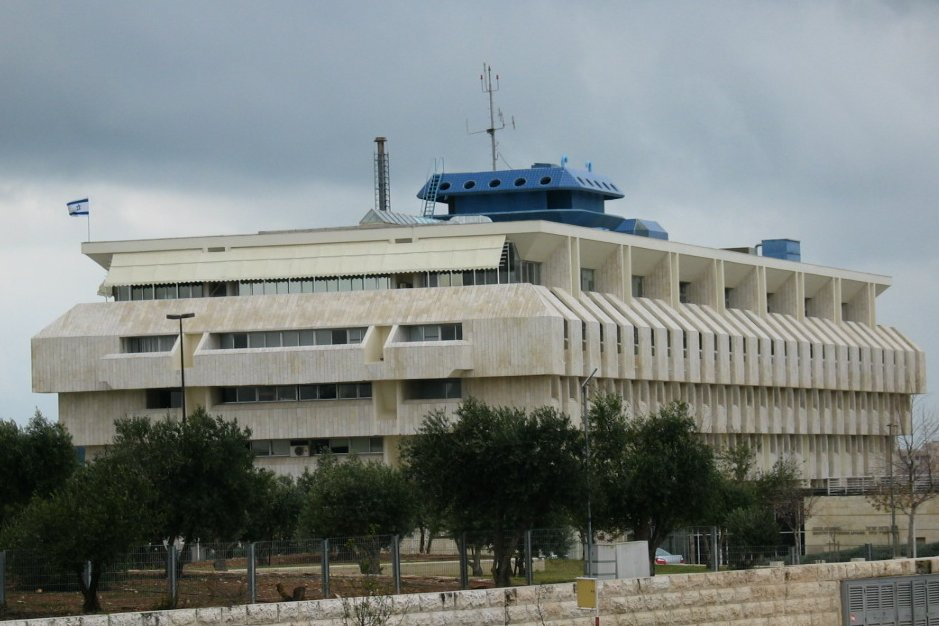
Bank of Israel

The Israeli economy weathered and withstood the late-2000s recession, registering positive GDP growth in 2009 and ending the decade with an unemployment rate lower than that of many of its Western counterparts. There are several reasons behind this economic resilience: the country is a net lender rather than a borrower nation and the government and the Bank of Israel's generally conservative macro-economic policies. Two policies, in particular can be cited. First, the refusal of the government to succumb to pressure by the banks to appropriate large sums of public money to aid them early in the crisis, thus limiting their risky behavior. The second is the implementation of the recommendations of the Bach'ar commission in the early to mid-2000s which recommended decoupling the banks' depository- and Investment banking activities, contrary to the then-opposite trend, particularly in the United States, of easing such restrictions which had the effect of encouraging more risk-taking in the financial systems of those countries. American investors today make up the most significant portion of investors in Israel.

=== OECD membership ===
In May 2007, Israel was invited to open accession discussions with the OECD. In May 2010, the OECD voted unanimously to invite Israel to join, despite Palestinian objections. It became a full member on 7 September 2010. The OECD praised Israel's scientific and technological progress and described it as having "produced outstanding outcomes on a world scale."

== Challenges ==
Israel is facing challenges of high dependency on the growing number of Ultra-Orthodox Jews, who have a low level of official labor force participation among men. This situation could lead to a materially lower employment-to-population ratio and a higher dependency ratio in the future. The governor of the Bank of Israel, Stanley Fischer, stated that the growing poverty amongst the Ultra-Orthodox is hurting the Israeli economy. According to the data published by Ian Fursman, 60% of the poor households in Israel are of the Haredi Jews and Israeli Arabs. Together, these two groups represent 25–28% of the Israeli population. Organizations such as The Kemach Foundation, Gvahim, Jerusalem Village, and The Jerusalem Business Networking Forum are addressing these challenges with job placement services and networking events.

=== Wealth migration ===
The 2024 Henley & Partners Report, indicates that around 1,700 millionaires have departed the country since 2023, seeking investment migration opportunities to mitigate risks and explore alternative residency options. Between 2013 and 2022 over 10,500 wealthy individuals moved to Israel. The report announced a remarkable 232% increase in investment migration applications from Israeli citizens in 2023. Factors driving this trend include a 5% depreciation in the shekel's value against the US dollar, a 10% decline in real estate prices in Tel Aviv, Israel's growing international isolation, and the financial pressure resulting from the war in 2023. The process corrected some in 2025, when the number of millionaires in Israel rose 4.7% to 195,000. The Israeli Shekel has strengthened against the US dollar and the Euro, and the Tel Aviv stock exchange has soared to record highs, outperforming stocks around the world.

=== Red Sea crisis ===
The Red Sea crisis caused by the Houthi missile attacks severely affected shipping through the Red Sea. The port of Eilat, Israel's southern gateway, has suffered almost shut down, leading to requests for government support. Half of the port's workers were at risk of losing their jobs. Many ships are avoiding the Red Sea and rerouting around Africa, which makes the journey three weeks longer and more expensive. Insurance costs for all ships in the Red Sea surged, with some ships seeing a 250% increase or being denied coverage altogether.

=== 2023 Israeli judicial reform ===
Following the 2023 Israeli judicial reform, banks in the country experienced a significant surge in fund withdrawals, occurring at a rate ten times higher than normal. Executives warned that these political changes could adversely affect the economy, resulting in a decline in the shekel's value and a loss of investor confidence. A report from The Times of Israel on March 5, 2023, noted that as the shekel depreciated against the dollar and euro, the Tel Aviv Stock Exchange fell compared to stock markets in the EU and the US. Those shares have since rebounded. Tel Aviv shares are at all time highs as of July 2026. Numerous companies and to a greater extent private citizens have withdrew investments from Israel, leading to an outflow of over $4 billion in just a few weeks.

=== Gaza war (2023–present) ===
After the Gaza war began on 7 October 2023, the Israeli stock markets and currency nosedived. Both have since surged. It is estimated that Israel would lose around $400 billion in the next decade and experience a significant economic shock. Ninety percent of this will result from indirect consequences such as reduced investment, labor market disruptions, and hindered productivity growth. In August 2024, Fitch Ratings downgraded Israel's credit rating. The Bank of Israel has counted war-related costs from 2023 to 2025 at up to $55.6 billion. Another consequence of the war was that consumer spending dropped by 27%, imports fell by 42%, and exports declined by 18%.

On 19 July 2024, the International Court of Justice released an important advisory opinion stating that countries must not recognize, assist, or support the illegal circumstances arising from Israel's occupation of Palestinian territories. The court declared that all nations must avoid any economic or trade relations with Israel concerning the Occupied Palestinian territories (OPT) or any areas that could reinforce its unlawful presence there. Additionally, it emphasized the need to take steps to prevent trade or investment activities that contribute to sustaining the illegal situation established by Israel in the OPT. On May 26, 2023, the European Trade Union Confederation (ETUC), which represents over 45 million workers and their trade unions across Europe, announced a boycott of products made in illegal Israeli settlements in the occupied Palestinian territories. The ETUC emphasized the need for regulatory measures to ban the import and export of goods produced in these illicit settlements by entities within the European Union, as stipulated by EU treaties and international law.

In early 2026, Israel's Finance Ministry stated that the country had raised $6 billion in a three-tranche international bond offering, marking its first global issuance since the October 2023 Gaza ceasefire and drawing strong demand from around 300 investors across more than 30 countries, including participants from Abraham Accords states. The offering comprised bonds of various maturities, with pricing spreads narrowing close to pre-war levels, indicating renewed international demand for Israeli sovereign debt. Officials said the proceeds would help cover Israel's 2026 financing needs, while the breadth participation was widely seen as evidence of continued investor confidence in the country's economic resilience.

=== Iran-Israel war ===
According to preliminary estimates by the Central Bureau of Statistics, the Israeli economy contracted by 3.5 percent in the April–June quarter of 2025, as the war with Iran shut down many businesses and negatively impacted consumer spending, exports, and investment. Trade reportedly contracted by 6.2 percent during this period. However, the first economic contraction of 2.8 percent occurred in the last quarter of 2023, coinciding with the war in Gaza.

In March 2026, the Israeli government approved an updated 2026 state budget that added around 30 billion shekels to defense spending in the aftermath of Operation Roaring Lion, bringing the defense budget to about 112 billion shekels. The budget reportedly reflected disagreements between the Finance Ministry and the military over reserve force planning for 2026, and also included billions of shekels in coalition funds for ultra-Orthodox institutions and West Bank settlements.

== Data ==
The following table shows the main economic indicators in 1980–2021 (with IMF staff estimates in 2022–2027). Inflation under 5% is in green.

Year	GDP (in bn. US$PPP)	GDP per capita (in US$ PPP)	GDP (in bn. US$nominal)	GDP per capita (in US$ nominal)	GDP growth (real)	Inflation rate	Unemployment	Government debt (in % of GDP)
1980	28.4	7,240.1	24.9	6,356.5	▲3.6%	▲316.6%	4.8%	n/a
1981	▲32.5	▲8,240.4	▲26.4	▲6,687.2	▲4.7%	▲116.8%	▲5.1%	n/a
1982	▲35.0	▲8,717.7	▲28.3	▲7,040.6	▲1.4%	▲120.4%	▼5.0%	n/a
1983	▲37.3	▲9,100.1	▲31.6	▲7,688.7	▲2.6%	▲145.6%	▼4.6%	n/a
1984	▲39.5	▲9,514.1	▼29.9	▼7,186.1	▲2.2%	▲373.8%	▲5.9%	n/a
1985	▲42.6	▲10,072.8	▼27.8	▼6,562.4	▲4.5%	▲304.6%	▲6.7%	n/a
1986	▲45.0	▲10,477.6	▲34.2	▲7,955.1	▲3.6%	▲48.2%	▲7.1%	n/a
1987	▲49.6	▲11,355.8	▲40.8	▲9,349.1	▲7.5%	▲19.9%	▼6.1%	n/a
1988	▲53.2	▲11,975.7	▲50.6	▲11,391.5	▲3.6%	▲16.2%	▲6.4%	n/a
1989	▲56.0	▲12,408.2	▲51.5	▲11,394.3	▲1.4%	▲20.2%	▲8.9%	n/a
1990	▲62.0	▲13,308.1	▲60.7	▲13,035.7	▲6.6%	▲17.2%	▲9.6%	n/a
1991	▲67.0	▲13,553.3	▲68.9	▲13,924.0	▲4.6%	▲19.0%	▲10.6%	n/a
1992	▲73.5	▲14,340.4	▲77.0	▲15,021.2	▲7.2%	▲11.9%	▲11.2%	n/a
1993	▲78.1	▲14,841.5	▲77.4	▼14,708.3	▲3.8%	▲10.9%	▼10.0%	n/a
1994	▲85.3	▲15,813.5	▲88.3	▲16,367.6	▲7.0%	▲12.3%	▼7.8%	n/a
1995	▲95.5	▲17,233.8	▲104.9	▲18,927.9	▲9.7%	▲10.0%	▼6.9%	n/a
1996	▲103.0	▲18,131.5	▲114.5	▲20,153.2	▲5.9%	▲11.3%	▲8.3%	n/a
1997	▲108.8	▲18,677.3	▲118.9	▲20,410.4	▲3.8%	▲9.0%	▲9.5%	n/a
1998	▲114.5	▲19,191.2	▲120.1	▼20,119.2	▲4.1%	▲5.4%	▲10.7%	n/a
1999	▲120.0	▲19,616.7	▲120.9	▼19,766.9	▲3.3%	▲5.2%	▲11.1%	n/a
2000	▲133.4	▲21,216.5	▲136.0	▲21,641.3	▲8.7%	▲1.1%	▼10.9%	77.4%
2001	▲136.8	▲21,258.3	▼134.6	▼20,918.3	▲0.3%	▲1.1%	▲11.6%	▲81.3%
2002	▲138.8	▼21,137.0	▼125.1	▼19,044.9	▼-0.1%	▲5.7%	▲12.9%	▲87.3%
2003	▲143.5	▲21,460.9	▲131.3	▲19,634.9	▲1.4%	▲0.7%	▲13.4%	▲89.7%
2004	▲154.4	▲22,687.4	▲140.0	▲20,565.8	▲4.8%	▲-0.4%	▼12.9%	▼88.3%
2005	▲165.8	▲23,941.4	▲147.1	▲21,233.8	▲4.1%	▲1.3%	▼11.2%	▼85.4%
2006	▲180.5	▲25,596.8	▲158.7	▲22,501.1	▲5.6%	▲2.1%	▼10.5%	▼77.7%
2007	▲196.6	▲27,390.9	▲184.1	▲25,647.7	▲6.0%	▲0.5%	▼9.2%	▼70.9%
2008	▲206.8	▲28,309.7	▲220.5	▲30,182.5	▲3.3%	▲4.6%	▼7.7%	▼70.4%
2009	▲210.0	▼28,068.5	▼212.0	▼28,330.2	▲0.9%	▲3.3%	▲9.4%	▲73.0%
2010	▲224.6	▲29,469.5	▲238.4	▲31,278.0	▲5.7%	▲2.7%	▼8.3%	▼69.3%
2011	▲242.0	▲31,172.7	▲266.8	▲34,366.9	▲5.6%	▲3.4%	▼7.1%	▼67.4%
2012	▲255.7	▲32,336.1	▼262.3	▼33,170.0	▲2.6%	▲1.7%	▼6.9%	▼67.1%
2013	▲280.0	▲34,755.0	▲297.7	▲36,957.4	▲4.4%	▲1.5%	▼6.2%	▼66.0%
2014	▲285.4	▲34,755.7	▲314.3	▲38,276.6	▲3.9%	▲0.5%	▼5.9%	▼64.9%
2015	▲300.5	▲35,876.9	▼303.4	▼36,221.1	▲2.5%	▲-0.6%	▼5.2%	▼63.1%
2016	▲326.6	▲38,229.6	▲322.1	▲37,701.9	▲4.5%	▲-0.5%	▼4.8%	▼61.4%
2017	▲344.3	▲39,533.6	▲358.2	▲41,131.7	▲4.3%	▲0.2%	▼4.2%	▼59.7%
2018	▲366.9	▲41,320.4	▲376.7	▲42,422.9	▲4.1%	▲0.8%	▼4.0%	▲59.9%
2019	▲389.0	▲42,977.1	▲402.5	▲44,466.8	▲4.2%	▲0.8%	▼3.8%	▼58.8%
2020	▼386.4	▼41,930.7	▲413.3	▲44,850.4	▼-1.9%	▲-0.6%	▲4.3%	▲70.7%
2021	▲437.1	▲46,659.3	▲488.5	▲52,151.9	▲8.6%	▲1.5%	▲5.0%	▼68.0%
2022	▲496.8	▲52,173.1	▲527.2	▲55,358.8	▲6.1%	▲4.5%	▼3.9%	▼61.5%
2023	▲530.0	▲54,750.6	▲564.2	▲58,273.4	▲3.0%	▲3.6%	▼3.8%	▼57.6%
2024	▲557.4	▲56,633.2	▲591.3	▲60,082.8	▲3.0%	▲2.5%	▼3.7%	▼55.7%
2025	▲585.1	▲58,474.2	▲618.8	▲61,846.7	▲3.1%	▲2.2%	3.7%	▼55.1%
2026	▲615.6	▲60,526.4	▲647.4	▲63,650.9	▲3.3%	▲2.0%	3.7%	▼54.7%
2027	▲649.5	▲62,813.2	▲678.6	▲65,625.6	▲3.5%	▲1.9%	3.7%	▼54.4%

== Sectors ==
=== Agriculture ===
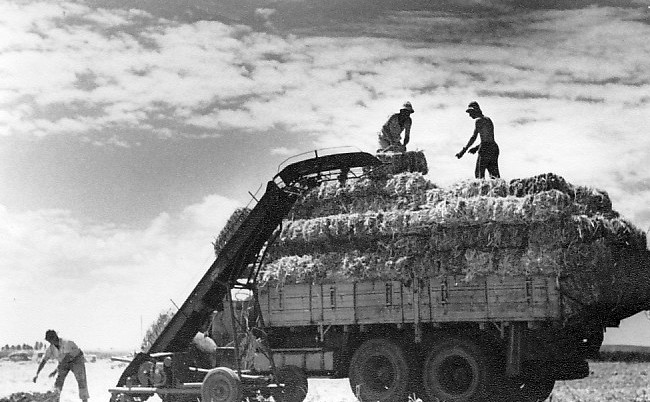
The Kibbutzim, collective communities in Israel traditionally based on agriculture, played an important role in Israel's economy until the late 1970s.

In 2017, 2.4% of the country's GDP is derived from agriculture. Of a total labor force of 2.7 million, 2.6% are employed in agricultural production while 6.3% in services for agriculture. While Israel imports substantial quantities of grain (approximately 80% of local consumption), it is largely self-sufficient in other agricultural products and foodstuffs. For centuries, farmers of the region have grown varieties of citrus fruits, such as grapefruit, oranges and lemons. Citrus fruits are still Israel's major agricultural export. In addition, Israel is one of the world's leading greenhouse-food-exporting countries. Israel also produces and exports flowers and cotton. The country exports more than $1.3 billion worth of agricultural products every year, including farm produce as well as $1.2 billion worth of agricultural inputs and technology. Israeli technological innovations in agriculture and water technology have given the Israeli AgTech sector a competitive edge and allows Israeli agtech companies to operate in numerous countries around the world.

=== Fishing ===
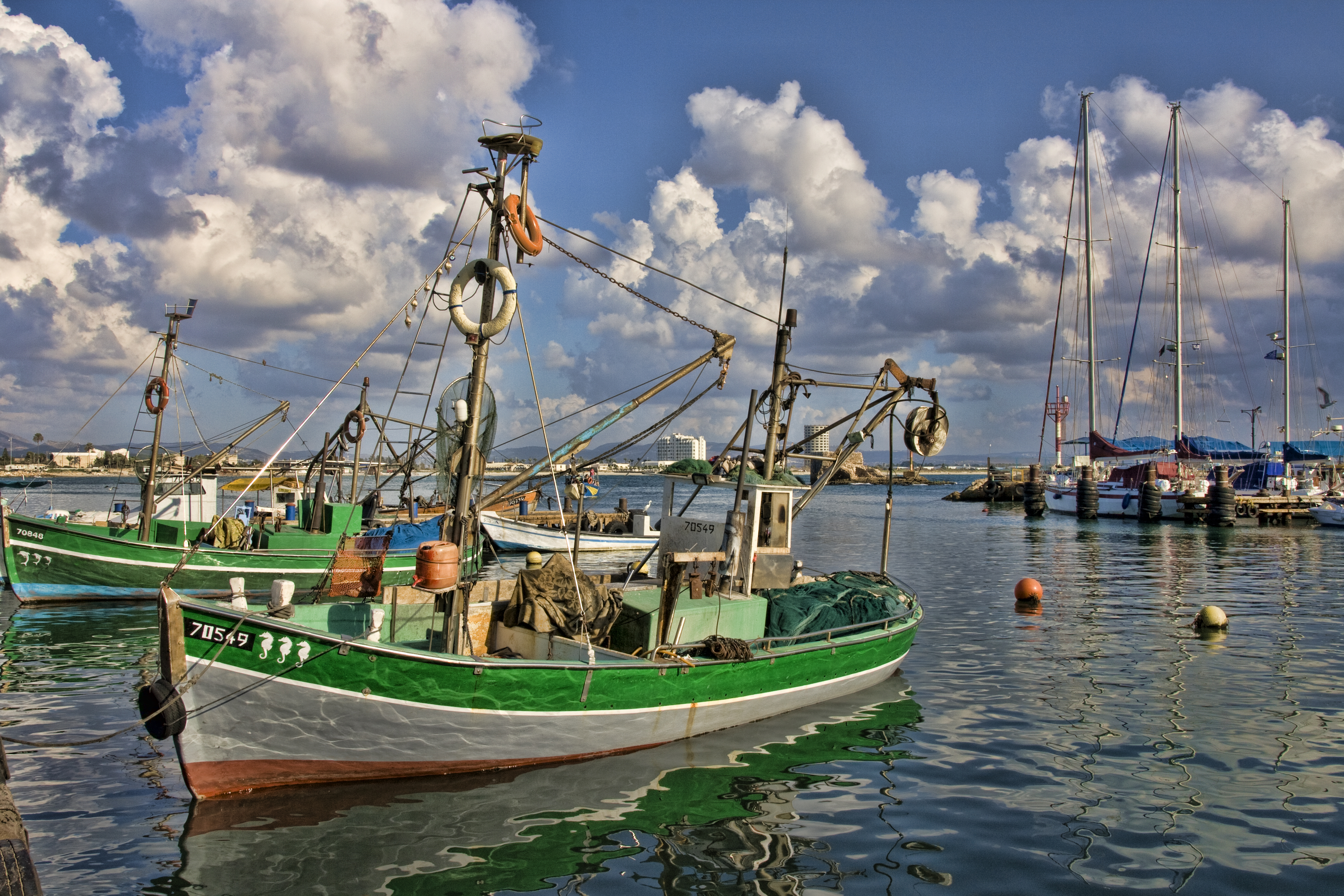
Fishing boats in Acre

Fishing in Israel is a branch of the Israeli economy with historical significance. The three main natural fishing zones are the Mediterranean Sea, the Gulf of Aqaba, and the Kinneret (Sea of Galilee). Lake Hula was formerly a significant fishing area, but it was drained in the 1950s. Aquaculture, the farming of fish in ponds or cages, is also growing in importance.

=== Financial services ===
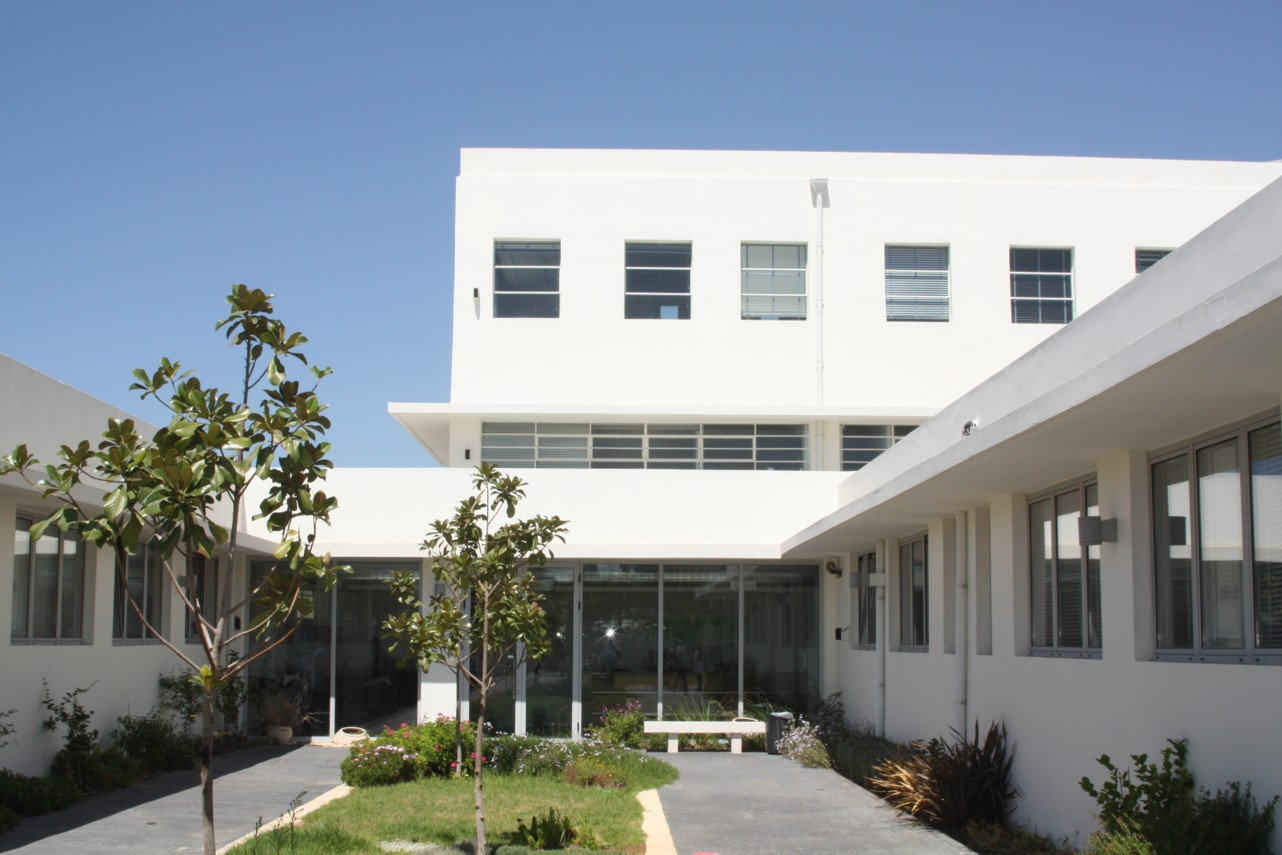
Jerusalem Venture Partners (JVP) compound in Jerusalem, one of Israel's largest venture capital firms

Israel has over 100 active venture capital funds operating throughout the country with US$10 billion under management. In 2004, international foreign funds from various nations around the world committed over 50 percent of the total dollars invested. Israel's venture capital sector has rapidly developed from the early 1990s, and has about 70 active venture capital funds (VC), of which 14 international VCs have Israeli offices. Israel's thriving venture capital and business-incubator industry played an important role in financing the country's flourishing high-tech sector. In 2008, venture capital investment in Israel, rose 19 percent to $1.9 billion.

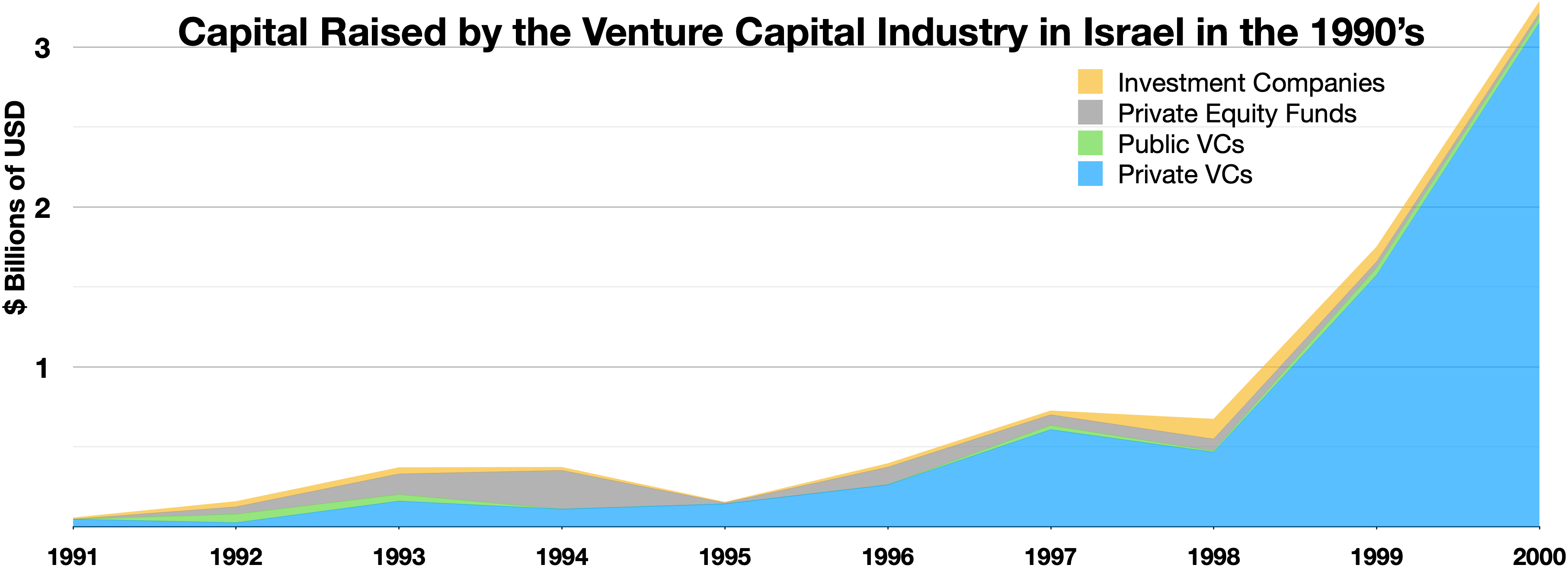
The Yozma Fund kick-started the venture capital industry in Israel during the 1990s, raising ~$8 billion total.

"Between 1991 and 2000, Israel's annual venture-capital outlays, nearly all private, rose nearly 60-fold, from $58 million to $3.3 billion; companies launched by Israeli venture funds rose from 100 to 800; and Israel's information-technology revenues rose from $1.6 billion to $12.5 billion. By 1999, Israel ranked second only to the United States in invested private-equity capital as a share of GDP. Israel led the world in the share of its growth attributable to high-tech ventures: 70 percent."

Israel's thriving venture capital industry has played an important role in funding the country's booming high-technology sector, with hundreds of prosperous Israeli private equity and venture capital firms. The 2008 financial crisis negatively affected the availability of venture capital locally. In 2009, there were 63 mergers and acquisitions in the Israeli market worth a total of $2.54 billion; 7% below 2008 levels ($2.74 billion), when 82 Israeli companies were merged or acquired, and 33% lower than 2007 proceeds ($3.79 billion) when 87 Israeli companies were merged or acquired. Numerous Israeli high tech companies have been acquired by various global multinational corporations for their ability to produce profit-driven technologies in addition to their arsenal of reliable corporate management and quality administrative personnel. In addition to venture capital funds, many of the world's leading investment banks, pension funds, and insurance companies have a strong presence in Israel committing their funds to financially back Israeli high-tech firms and benefit from its prosperous high tech sector. These institutional investors include Goldman Sachs, Bear Stearns, Deutsche Bank, JP Morgan, Credit Suisse First Boston, Merrill Lynch, CalPERS, Ontario Teachers Pension Plan, and AIG.

Israel also has a small but fast growing hedge fund industry. Within five years between 2007 and 2012, the number of active hedge funds doubled to 60. Israel-based hedge funds have registered an increase of 162% from 2006 to 2012, when they managed a total of $2 billion (₪8 billion) and employed about 300 people. The ever-growing hedge fund industry in Israel is also attracting a myriad of investors from around the world, particularly from the United States.

In 2022, Tel Aviv was ranked 53rd on the Global Financial Centres Index.

In 2023, despite the occurrence of war and significant events like a legal reform and interest rate rise that shook the capital market and created uncertainty, about 40% of the companies traded on the Tel Aviv Stock Exchange continued to distribute dividends to their shareholders. This was particularly evident in the energy, oil and gas industries, and in the banking and financial services sector. The year marked a record in the total dividend distributed to public shareholders, with about 62% of the distributed amount (16.8 billion shekels), compared to about 55% of the dividends (15.8 billion shekels) in 2022, with the remainder being paid to stakeholders. The average dividend yield of the exchange-listed companies in 2023 was approximately 2.9%, compared to about 2.8% in the previous year. This was the highest return since 2017 and higher than that of 2022, the record year, as the average market value in 2023 was about 9% lower than in 2022, while the total dividend was only about 5% lower than the previous year.

=== High technology ===
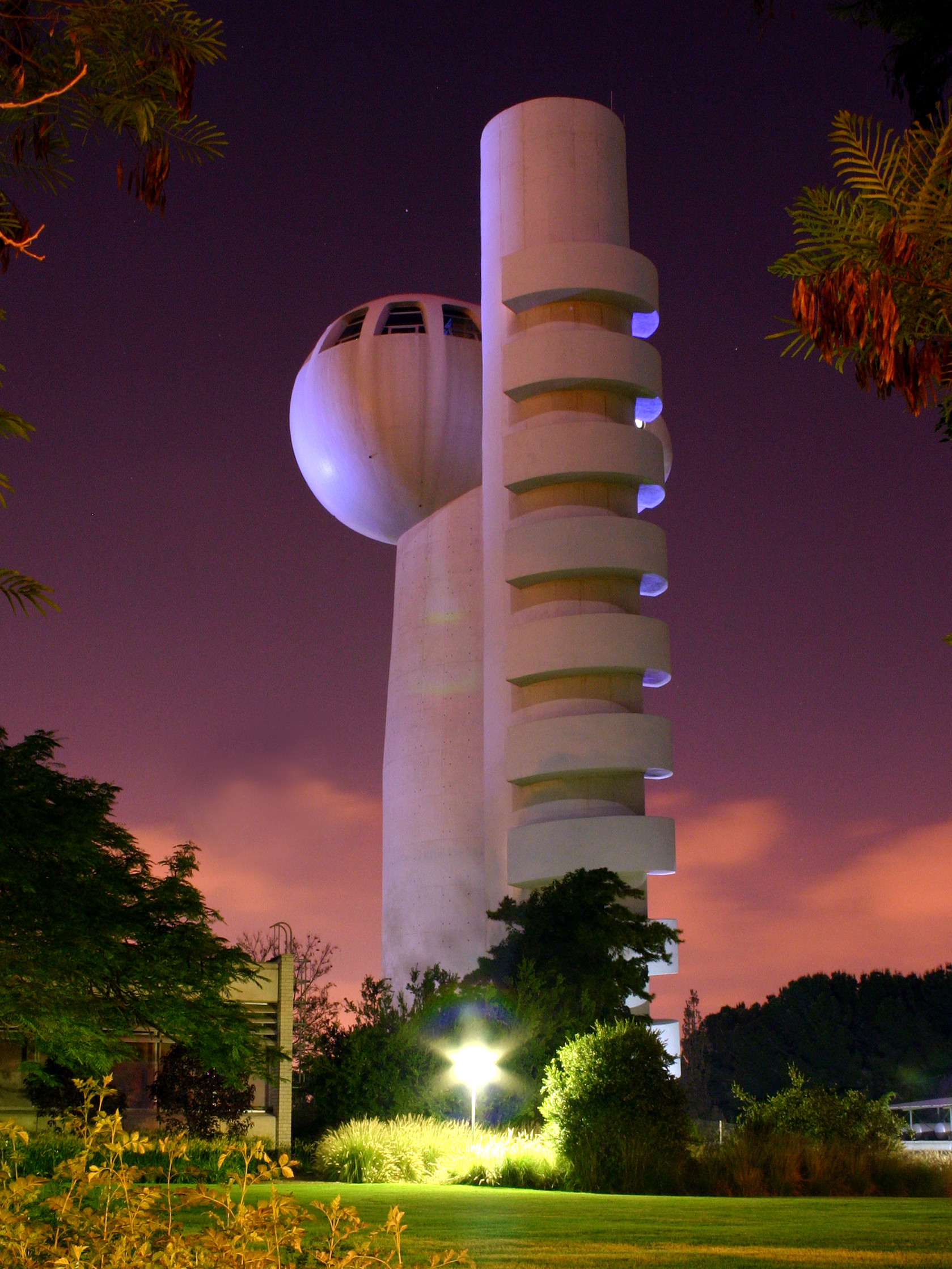
Weizmann Institute of Science, Rehovot

Science and technology in Israel is one of the country's most highly developed and industrialized sectors. The modern Israeli ecosystem of high technology is highly optimized making up a significant bulk of the Israeli economy. The percentage of Israelis engaged in scientific and technological inquiry, and the amount spent on research and development (R&D) concerning gross domestic product (GDP), is among the highest in the world, with 140 scientists and technicians per 10,000 employees. In comparison, the same is 85 per 10,000 in the United States and 83 per 10,000 in Japan. Israel ranks fourth in the world in scientific activity, as measured by the number of scientific publications per million citizens. Israel's percentage of the total number of scientific articles published worldwide is almost 10 times higher than its percentage of the world's population. The country is home to over 1,400 life science companies, including about 300 pharmaceutical companies, 600 medical device companies, 450 digital health companies, and 468 biotechnology companies. Israeli scientists, engineers, and technicians have contributed to the modern advancement of the natural sciences, agricultural sciences, computer sciences, electronics, genetics, medicine, optics, solar energy and various fields of engineering. The country has one of the world's technologically most literate populations. Israel has the second largest number of startup companies globally, behind only the United States, and remains one of the largest centers in the world for technology start-up enterprises. As of 2013, around 200 start-ups were being created annually in Israel. In 2019, there were nearly 7,000 active start-ups operating throughout the country. In 2021, there were 79 Israeli-established tech unicorns, with 32 of them headquartered in Israel. More than one-third of cybersecurity unicorns in the world were Israeli in 2021. Israel is also home to nearly 400 research and development centers owned by various multinational companies, including prominent high-technology giants such as Google, Microsoft, and Intel.

Israel is also a major semiconductor design hub. The country is home to numerous chip design centers owned by major multinational corporations, and is considered as having one of the most advanced chip design industries in the world. In 2021, a total of 37 multinational corporations were operating in Israel in the semiconductor field.

In 1998, Tel Aviv was named by Newsweek as one of the ten technologically most influential cities in the world. In 2012, the city was also named one of the best places for high-tech startup companies, placed second behind its California counterpart. In 2013, The Boston Globe ranked Tel Aviv as the second-best city for business start-ups, after Silicon Valley. In 2020, StartupBlink ranked Israel as having the third best startup ecosystem in the world, behind only the United States and United Kingdom.

As a result of the country's highly prolific and dynamic start-up culture, Israel is often referred to as the "Start-Up Nation." and the "Silicon Valley of the Middle East". Programs that send people to Israel to explore the "Start-Up Nation" economy include TAVtech Ventures and TAMID Group. This success has been attributed by some to widespread service in the Israel Defense Forces and its development of talent which then fuels the high-tech industry upon discharge.

In recent years, the industry has faced a shortage of technology specialists; 15% of positions in the high technology sector of Israel were unfilled as of 2019. However, the largest number of unfilled job positions (31%) are in software engineering specialities: DevOps, back-end, data science, machine learning and artificial intelligence. Therefore, salaries of specialists in the Israeli market also increased significantly. To solve this problem, IT companies look for filling the gaps abroad. Consequently, they employ about 25% of their entire workforce overseas. Most companies choose to hire employees from Ukraine (45%) and the United States (with 16%) are the second most popular offshoring destination country. In 2017, the Council for Higher Education in Israel launched a five-year program to increase the number of graduates from computer science and engineering programs by 40%.

In 2025, the Israeli technology sector recorded a historic surge in exit activity, with the total value of mergers, acquisitions, and initial public offerings reaching 58.8 billion dollars. This represents a 340 percent increase from the 13.4 billion dollars reported in 2024.

A new study published on 24 December 2025 found that Israeli technology companies have expanded their workforce and operations across Europe despite rising antisemitism and political tensions since the October 2023 outbreak of war in Gaza. The report, produced by venture capital fund Planven, consulting firm KPMG, and EIT Hub Israel, shows that around 1,686 Israeli tech companies employed over 30,000 people in Europe as of January 2025, with workforce growth outpacing that in Israel's domestic sector. Major hubs for these companies include the United Kingdom, Germany, France, Poland, Spain, and Central and Eastern European countries. The study notes that many firms are establishing research and development centres and long‑term local operations, particularly in fields such as artificial intelligence, cybersecurity, and robotics. Despite social and political opposition in parts of Europe, the data indicate that economic integration of Israeli tech firms into European markets has continued over the past three years, highlighting a divergence between economic collaboration and political sentiment.

On December 31, 2025, reports emerged that Nvidia is in advanced stages of acquiring Tel Aviv-based AI21 Labs for between 2 billion and 3 billion dollars to consolidate its dominance in generative artificial intelligence. This potential deal follows the 32 billion dollar acquisition of the cloud security firm Wiz by Alphabet and the 25 billion dollar acquisition of CyberArk by Palo Alto Networks.

In addition, in 2025, the public markets saw a significant revival with seven Israeli companies completing initial public offerings at a combined valuation of 14.6 billion dollars, including major listings for Navan and eToro. Analysts suggest these results demonstrate the resilience of the Israeli high-tech ecosystem and its continued importance to global corporations despite regional geopolitical volatility.

=== Energy ===
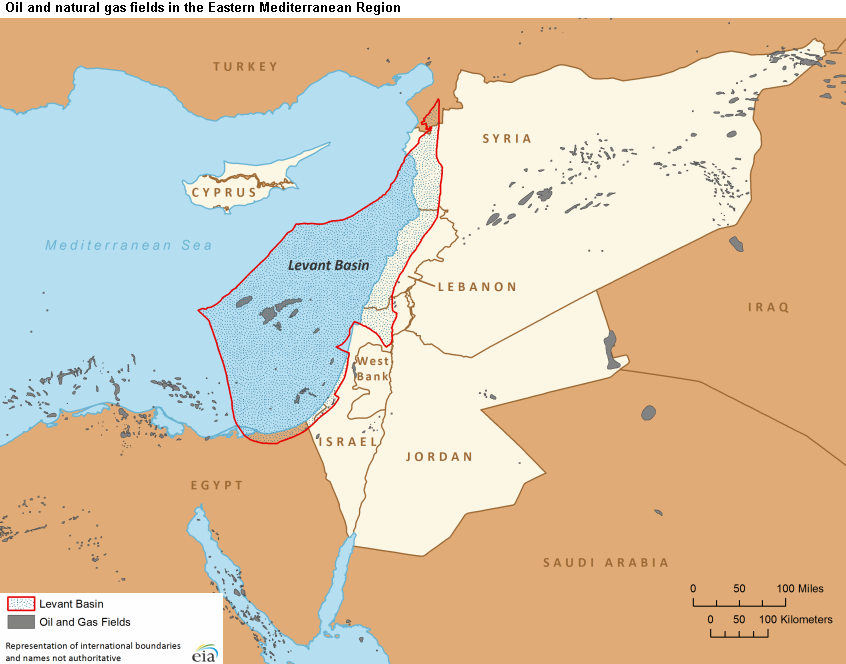
Known oil and gas fields in the Levant Basin (US EIA)

Consumption of fossil fuel energy sources in Israel since 1980. Coal consumption rose steadily since 1980 when it was negligible. Natural gas consumption was nearly zero in 2003 and has risen steadily since.

Historically, Israel relied on external imports for meeting most of its energy needs, spending an amount equivalent to over 5% of its GDP per year in 2009 on imports of energy products. The transportation sector relies mainly on gasoline and diesel fuel, while the majority of electricity production is generated using imported coal. As of 2013, Israel was importing about 100 mln barrels of oil per year. The country possesses negligible reserves of crude oil but does have domestic natural gas resources which were discovered in more significant quantities starting in 2009, after many decades of previously unsuccessful exploration.

==== Natural gas ====
Until the early 2000s, natural gas use in Israel was minimal. In the late 1990s, the government of Israel decided to encourage the usage of natural gas because of environmental, cost, and resource diversification reasons. At the time however, there were no domestic sources of natural gas and the expectation was that gas would be supplied from overseas in the form of LNG and by a future pipeline from Egypt (which eventually became the Arish–Ashkelon pipeline). Plans were made for the Israel Electric Corporation to construct several natural gas-driven power plants, for erecting a national gas distribution grid, and for an LNG import terminal.

Natural Gas Usage in Israel
2004	2005	2006	2007	2008	2009	2010	2014	2016	2018^{*}	2020^{*}	2022^{*}	2024^{*}	2026^{*}	2028^{*}	2030^{*}
1.2	1.6	2.3	2.7	3.7	4.2	5.2	7.6	9.5	10.1	11.1	11.7	13	14.3	15.3	16.8
Figures are in Billion Cubic Meters (BCM) per year. ^{*}Projected

==== Oil shale and petroleum ====
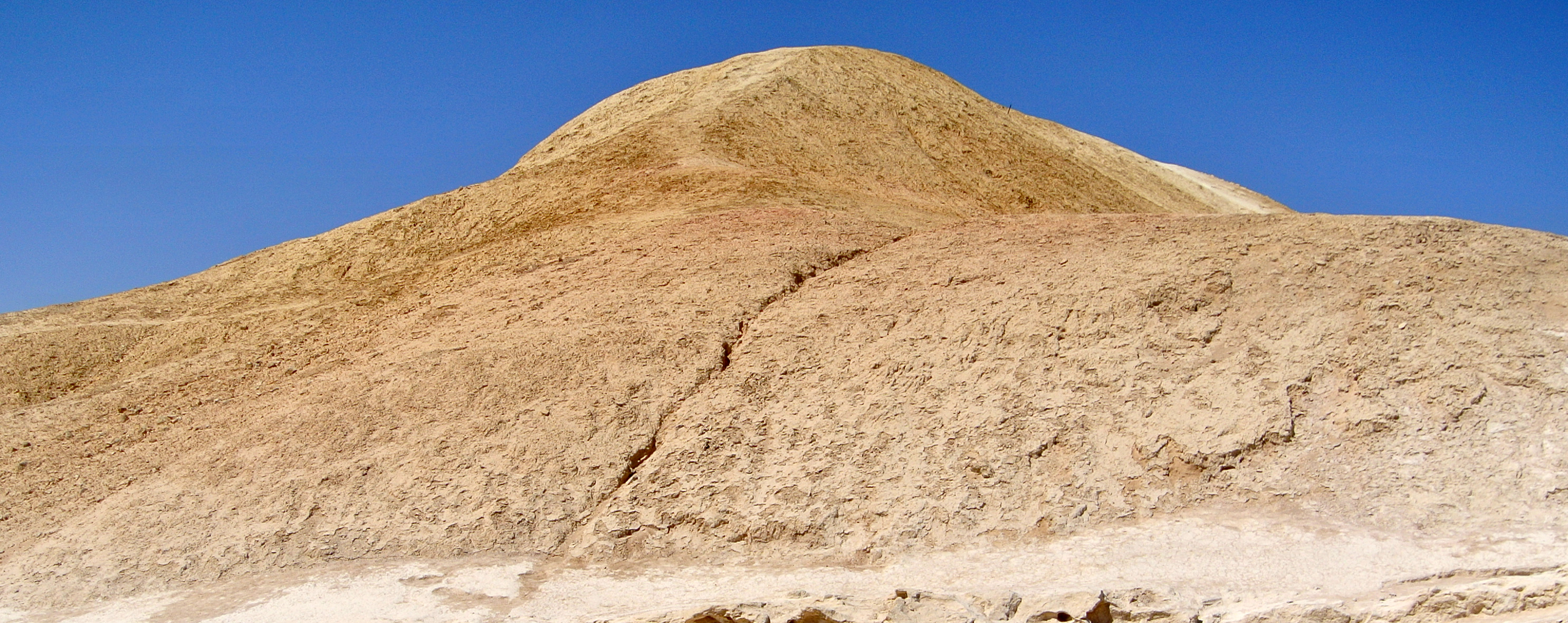
Ghareb Formation (an Upper Cretaceous oil shale) in Wadi Hawarim, southern Israel

Oil shale in Israel is widespread but an undeveloped resource, largely because of economic and technological constraints. Israeli oil shales belong to the group of Upper Cretaceous marinite deposits. Although oil-shale deposits may lie under as much as 15% of the country, only a small part of these are mineable. According to the Geological Survey of Israel, deposits that could have the biggest economic potential are located in the northern Negev, the largest being the Rotem-Yamin formation. For several decades, oil shale was used for small-scale power generation at Mishor Rotem. Several Israeli companies have proposed shale oil extraction; testing of the viability of the oil shale industry is currently being undertaken by Israel Energy Initiatives. However, as of 2011, there are no commercial oil shale operations in Israel.

==== Recent discoveries ====
In 2000, a 33-billion-cubic-metre (BCM), or 1,200-billion-cubic-foot, natural-gas field was located offshore Ashkelon, with commercial production starting in 2004. As of 2014 however, this field is nearly depleted—earlier than expected due to increased pumping to partially compensate for the loss of imported Egyptian gas in the wake of unrest associated with the fall of the Mubarak regime in 2011. In 2009, a significant gas find named Tamar, with proven reserves of 223 BCM or 7.9×10^{12} cu ft (307 BCM total proven + probable) was located in deep water approximately 90 km (60 mi) west of Haifa, as well as a smaller 15 BCM (530×10^{9} cu ft) field situated nearer the coastline. Furthermore, results of 3D seismic surveys and test drilling conducted since 2010 have confirmed that an estimated 621 BCM (21.9×10^{12} cu ft) natural-gas deposit named Leviathan exists in a large underwater geological formation nearby the large gas field already discovered in 2009.

In early 2012 the Israeli cabinet announced plans to set up a sovereign wealth fund (called "the Israeli Citizens' Fund").The Tamar field began commercial production on 30 March 2013 after four years of development. The supply of gas from Tamar was expected to aid the Israeli economy, which had suffered losses of more than ₪20 billion, equivalent to ₪2.03162×10^{10} in 2021, between 2011 and 2013, resulting from the disruption of gas supplies from neighboring Egypt (and which are not expected to resume due to Egypt's decision to indefinitely suspend its gas supply agreement to Israel). As a result, Israel, as well as its neighbor Jordan, which also suffered from disruption of gas deliveries from Egypt, had to resort to importing significantly more expensive and polluting liquid heavy fuels as substitute sources of energy. The ensuing energy crisis in Israel was lifted once the Tamar field came online in 2013, while Jordan committed to a US$10 billion, 15-year gas supply deal totaling 45 BCM from the Israeli Leviathan field which is scheduled to come online in late 2019. The agreement is estimated to save Jordan US$600 million per year in energy costs. In 2018, the owners of the Tamar and Leviathan fields announced that they are negotiating an agreement with a consortium of Egyptian firms for the supply of up to 64 BCM of gas over 10 years valued at up to US$15 billion. Today, Israel makes 60% of its electricity from domestic gas, 40% from solar energy (most per capita in the world) and fossil fuels. Israel has phased out electricity generation from the burning of coal. The transportation sector relies mainly on gasoline, electricity and diesel fuel.

Field	Discovered	Production	Estimated size
Noa North	1999	2012 to 2014	originally, 50 billion cubic feet (1.4 billion cubic metres); field depleted
Mari-B	2000	2004 to 2015	originally, 1 trillion cubic feet (28 billion cubic metres); field depleted
Tamar	2009	2013	10.8 trillion cubic feet (310 billion cubic metres)
Dalit	2009	Not in production	700 billion cubic feet (20 billion cubic metres)
Leviathan	2010	2019	22 trillion cubic feet (620 billion cubic metres)
Dolphin	2011	Not in production	81.3 billion cubic feet (2.30 billion cubic metres)
Tanin	2012	Not in production	1.2–1.3 trillion cubic feet (34–37 billion cubic metres)
Karish	2013	2022	2.3–3.6 trillion cubic feet (65–102 billion cubic metres)

In January 2026, Chevron and its partners announced that a Final Investment Decision (FID) deal was reaches in order to expand the Leviathan gas field's production capacity. The project aims to increase annual delivery to 21 bcm to bolster regional energy security.

==== Electricity ====
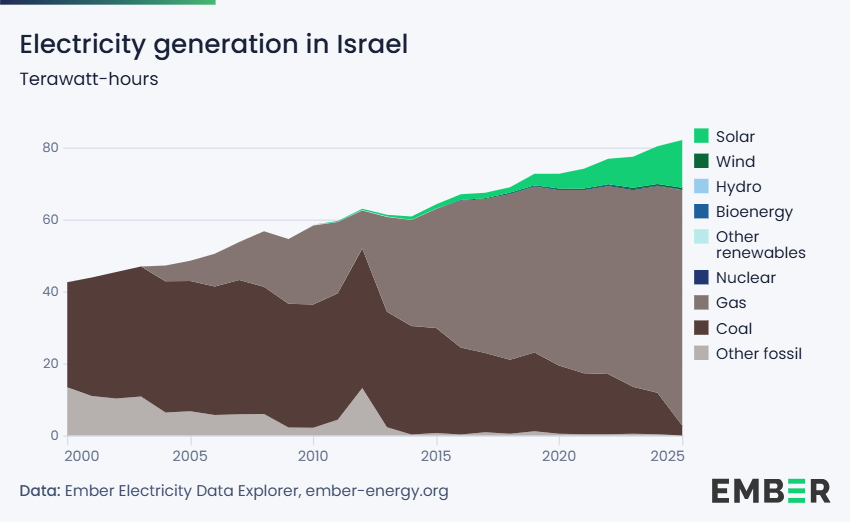
Electricity generation in Israel in terawatt-hours

Renewable electricity production in Israel

Since the founding of the state through the mid-2010s decade, the state-owned utility, Israel Electric Corporation (IEC) had an effective monopoly on power generation in the country. In 2010 the company sold 52,037 GWh of electricity. Until the mid-2010s the country also faced a persistently low operating reserve, which is mostly the result of Israel being an "electricity island". Most countries have the capability of relying on power drawn from producers in adjacent countries in the event of a power shortage. Israel's grid however, is unconnected to those of neighboring countries. This is mostly due to political reasons but also to the considerably less-developed nature of the power systems of Jordan and Egypt, whose systems constantly struggle to meet domestic demand and whose per-capita electric generation is less than one fifth that of Israel's. Nevertheless, while operating reserves in Israel were low, the country possessed sufficient generation and transmission capacity to meet domestic electricity needs and unlike in the countries surrounding it, rolling blackouts have historically been quite rare, even at periods of extreme demand.

Facing the increasing demand for electricity and concerned about the low reserve situation, the government of Israel began taking steps to increase the supply of electricity and operating reserve, as well to reduce the monopoly position of the IEC and increase competition in the electricity market starting in the second half of the 2000s decade. It instructed the IEC to construct several new power stations and encouraged private investment in the generation sector. By 2015, the IEC's share of total nationwide installed electric generation capacity had fallen to about 75%, with the company then possessing an installed generation capacity of about 13.6 gigawatts (GW). Since 2010, Independent Power Producers have constructed three new gas-fired combined cycle power stations with a total generation capacity of about 2.2 GW, while various industrial concerns constructed on-premises cogeneration facilities with a total electricity output of about 1 GW, and which are licensed by the electric authority to sell surplus electricity to the national grid at competitive rates. Also under construction is a 300 MW pumped storage facility, with two more in planning, plus several solar-powered plants.

In addition to the above steps, Israel and Cyprus are considering implementing the proposed EuroAsia Interconnector project. This consists of laying a 2000MW HVDC undersea power cable between them and between Cyprus and Greece, thus connecting Israel to the greater European power grid. If carried out, this will allow a further increase in the country's operating reserve as well as sell surplus electricity abroad.

In 2016, total nationwide electricity production was 67.2 GWh, of which 55.2% was generated using natural gas and 43.8% using coal – the first time the share of electricity production using natural gas exceeded that generated using coal.

Share of Total Electricity Generation Capacity at Full Output by Plant Type and Fuel Types Used by the IEC in 2010
	Coal	Fuel oil	Natural gas	Diesel
Installed capacity by plant type	39.7%	3.4%	39.8%	18.9%
Total annual generation by fuel source	61.0%	0.9%	36.6%	1.5%

==== Solar power ====
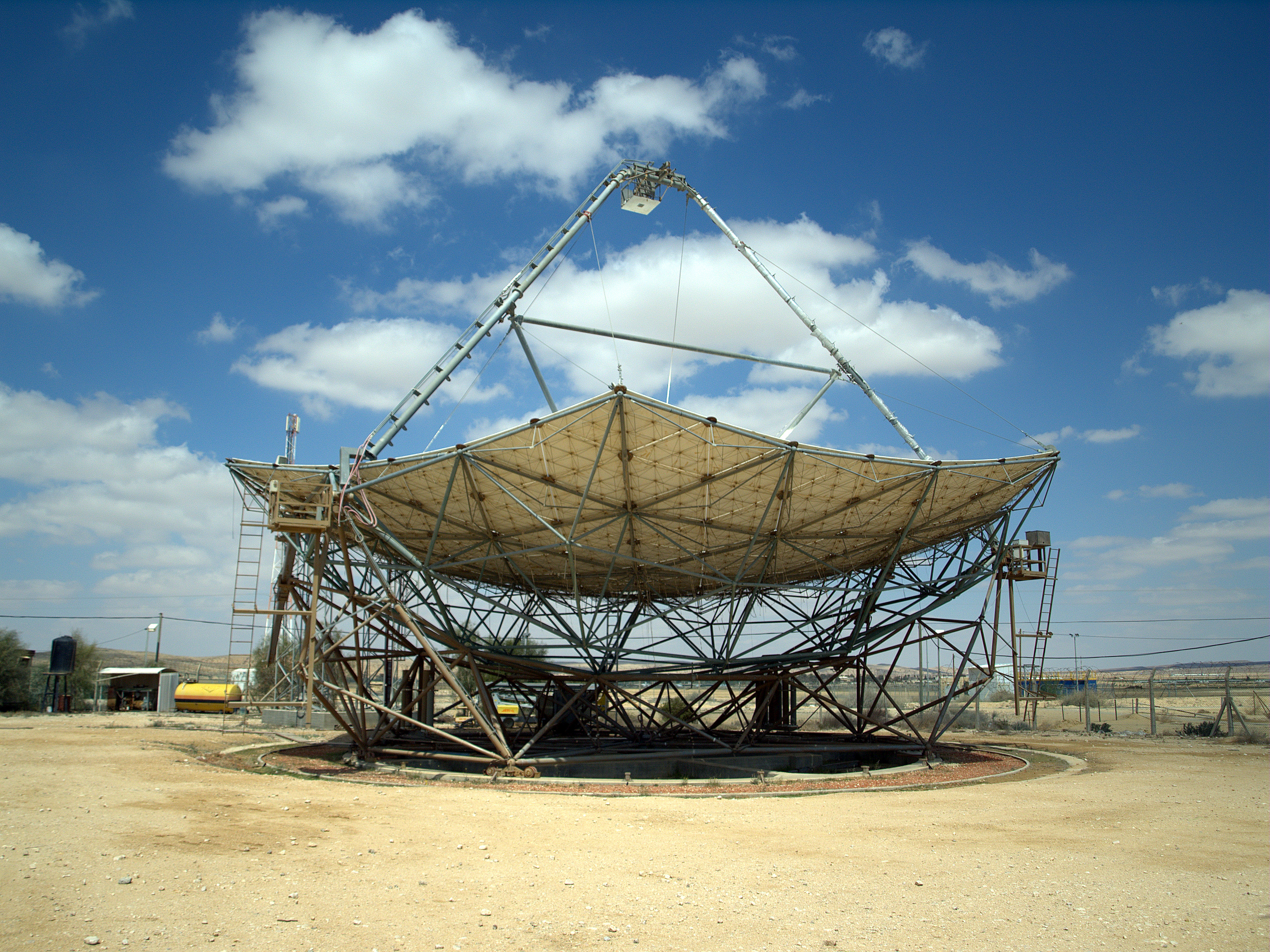
The Negev Desert is home to the Israeli solar research industry, in particular the National Solar Energy Center and the Arava Valley, which is the sunniest area of Israel.

Solar power in Israel and the Israeli solar energy industry has a history that dates to the founding of the country. In the 1950s, Levi Yissar developed a solar water heater to help assuage an energy shortage in the new country. By 1967 around one in twenty households heated their water with the sun and 50,000 solar heaters had been sold. With the 1973 oil crisis, Harry Zvi Tabor, the father of Israel's solar industry, developed the prototype solar water heater that is now used in over 90% of Israeli homes.

=== Industrial manufacturing ===
Israel has a large industrial capacity. It has a well-developed chemical industry with many of its products aimed at the export market. Most of the chemical plants are located in Ramat Hovav, the Haifa Bay area and near the Dead Sea. Israel Chemicals is one of the largest fertilizer and chemical companies in Israel and its subsidiary, the Dead Sea Works in Sodom is the world's fourth-largest producer and supplier of potash products. The company also produces other products such as magnesium chloride, industrial salts, de-icers, bath salts, table salt, and raw materials for the cosmetic industry. Industrial production of metals, machinery and electrical equipment, construction materials, consumer goods, and textiles, as well as food processing also form a significant part of the manufacturing sector. Machinery and equipment manufactured in Israel includes computer equipment, medical equipment, agricultural equipment, and robots. Israel manufactures about 300,000 tons of steel per year. It also has a successful semiconductor device fabrication industry, with several semiconductor manufacturing facilities in the country.

One of the country's largest employers is Israel Aerospace Industries which produces mainly aviation, space, and defense products. In 2017 the company had an order backlog of 11.4 billion US dollars. There are numerous other aerospace companies. Israeli aerospace companies are primarily sub-suppliers, focusing on fields such as machining, electronic systems and components, and composite materials. Israel is a major manufacturer and exporter of unmanned aerial vehicles. Israel's aerospace manufacturing capabilities include the manufacture of jet engine parts and small jet engines for unmanned aerial vehicles. Israel also has a significant pharmaceutical industry and is home to Teva Pharmaceutical Industries, one of the world's largest pharmaceutical companies, which employed 40,000 people as of 2011. It specializes in generic and proprietary pharmaceuticals and active pharmaceutical ingredients. It is the largest generic drug manufacturer in the world and one of the 15 largest pharmaceutical companies worldwide. In addition, Israel also has a shipbuilding industry through the company Israel Shipyards, which has one of the largest shipbuilding and repair facilities in the Eastern Mediterranean. For the civilian market, it builds merchant ships and other civilian watercraft as well as machinery for ports and heavy industries. It also builds naval craft for the defense market.

==== Automobile ====
The Sussita (Hebrew: סוסיתא) was an Israeli automobile manufactured by Autocars Co. between 1960 and 1978, initially in Haifa and later in Tirat Carmel. Produced in station wagon, commercial van, and pickup truck versions, the Sussita became an iconic symbol of early Israeli industry and is now considered a collector's item, alongside the sports car Sabra, also produced by Autocars Co.

==== Diamond industry ====
Israel is one of the world's three major centers for polished diamonds, alongside Belgium and India. Israel's net polished diamond exports slid 22.8 percent in 2012 as polished diamond exports fell to $5.56 billion from $7.2 billion in 2011. Net exports of rough diamonds dropped 20.1 percent to $2.8 billion and net exports of polished diamonds slipped 24.9 percent to $4.3 billion, while net rough diamond imports dropped 12.9 percent to $3.8 billion. Net exports and imports dropped during the Great Recession, particularly within the Eurozone, affected by the Euro area crisis, and the United States. The United States is the largest market accounting for 36% of overall export market for polished diamonds while Hong Kong remains at second with 28 percent and Belgium at 8 percent coming in third. As of 2016, cut diamonds were Israel's largest export product, comprising 23.2% of all exports.

==== Defense contracting ====
Israel is one of the world's major exporters of military equipment, accounting for 10% of the world total in 2007. Three Israeli companies were listed on the 2010 Stockholm International Peace Research Institute index of the world's top 100 arms-producing and military service companies: Elbit Systems, Israel Aerospace Industries and RAFAEL. The Defense industry in Israel is a strategically important sector and a large employer within the country. It is also a major player in the global arms market and is the 11th largest arms exporter in the world as of 2012. Total arms transfer agreements topped 12.9 billion between 2004 and 2011. Israeli defense equipment exports have reached 7 billion U.S. dollars in 2012, making it a 20 percent increase from the amount of defense-related exports in 2011. Much of the exports are sold to the United States and Europe. Other major regions that purchase Israeli defense equipment include Southeast Asia and Latin America. India is also major country for Israeli arms exports and has remained Israel's largest arms market in the world. Israel is considered to be the leading UAV exporter in the world. According to the Stockholm International Peace Research Institute, Israeli defense companies were behind 41% of all drones exported in 2001–2011. Israel's defense exports in 2021 reached US$11.2 billion in sales. Exports to Arab countries that joined the Abraham Accords made up 7% of all Israeli defense exports.

=== Transport ===
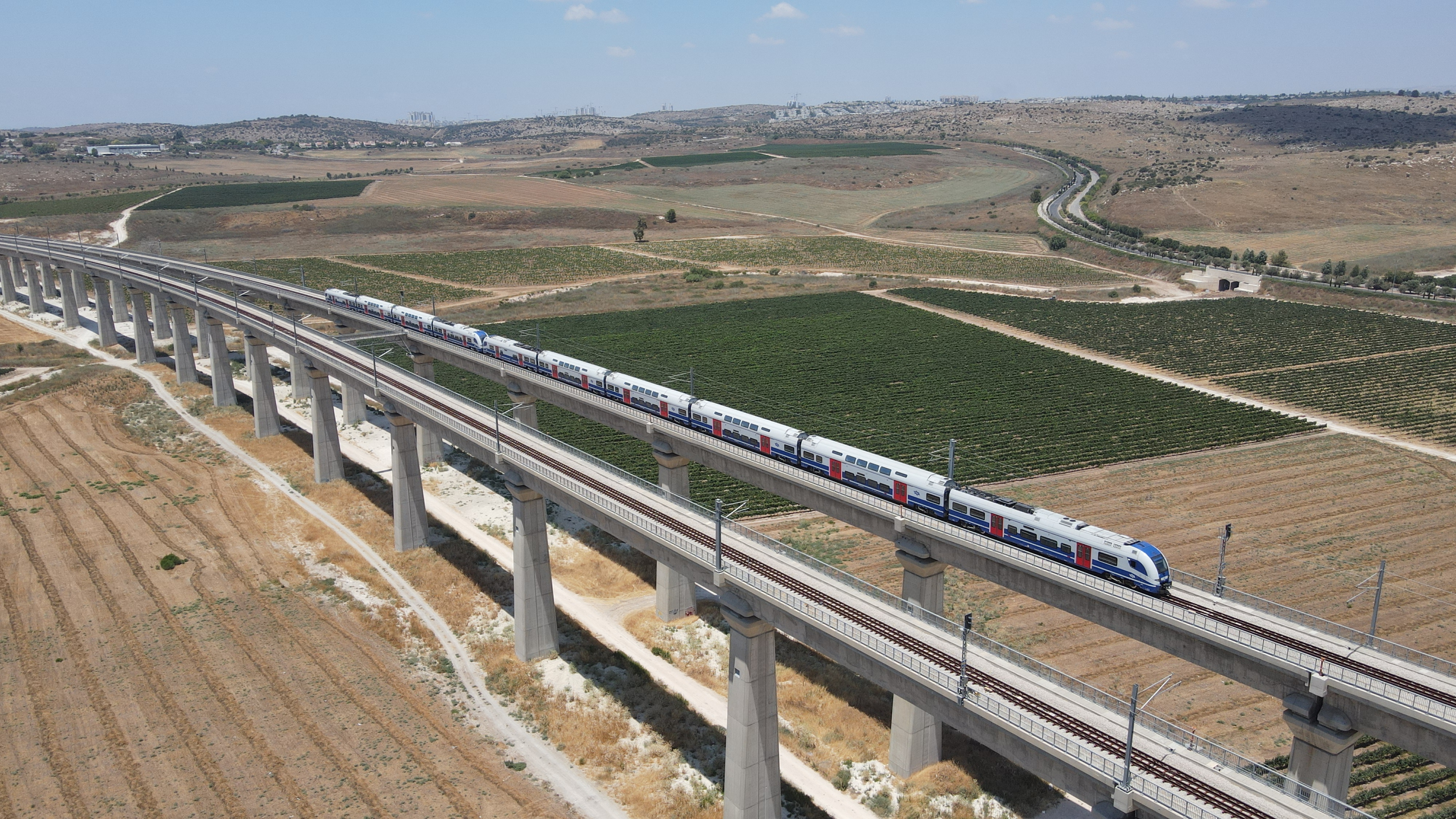
Electric train of Israel railways over the Ayalon valley

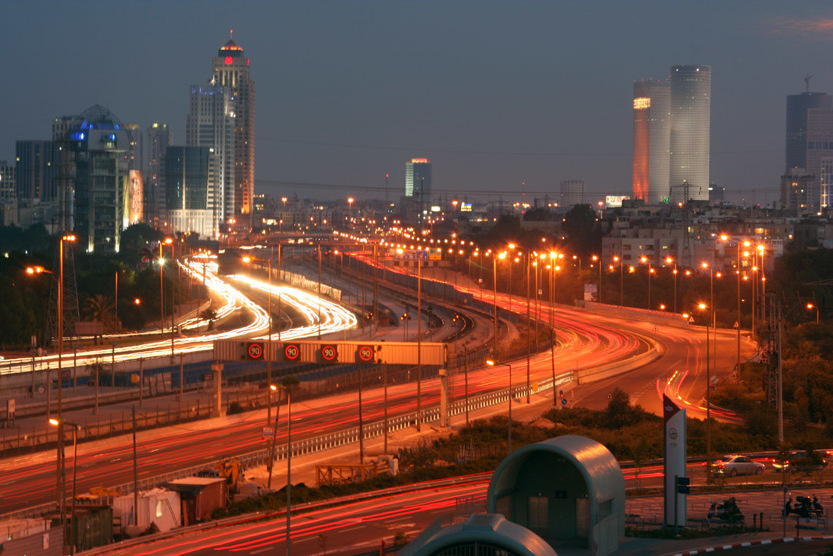
Ayalon Highway, Tel Aviv, 2004

Transportation in Israel primarily consists of nationwide rail transport, bus services, cycling (currently concentrating in the coast) as well as private vehicles. Most work related transportation in Israel is carried out by private motor vehicles, however in recent decades, Israel has prioritised the development of public transportation infrastructure. Cycling infrastructure is still primarily concentrated in the Tel Aviv region, while light rail operate currently in Jerusalem and Tel Aviv.

A lack of inland waterways and the small size of the country make air and water transport of only minor importance in domestic transportation, but they are vitally important for Israel's international transport links. Demands of population growth, political factors, the Israel Defense Forces, tourism and increased traffic set the pace for all sectors, being a major driver in the mobility transition towards railways and public transit while moving away from motorized road transport. All facets of transportation in Israel are under the supervision of the Ministry of Transport and Road Safety.

=== Education ===
As the Israeli economy is largely scientific and technological based, the labor market demands people who have achieved some form of higher education, particularly related to science and engineering in order to gain a competitive edge when searching for employment. In 2012, the country ranked second among OECD countries (tied with Japan and after Canada) for the percentage of 25 to 64-year-olds that have attained tertiary education with 46 percent compared with the OECD average of 32 percent. In addition, nearly twice as many Israelis aged 55–64 held a higher education degree compared to other OECD countries, with 47 percent holding an academic degree compared with the OECD average of 25%. It ranks fifth among OECD countries for the total expenditure on educational institutions as a percentage of GDP. In 2011, the country spent 7.3% of its GDP on all levels of education, comparatively more than the Organisation for Economic Cooperation and Development average of 6.3% and as a result has fostered an education system that helped transform the country and rapidly grow its economy over the past 70 years.

The Israeli education system has been praised for major role in spurring Israel's economic development and technological boom. Many international business leaders and organizations such as Microsoft founder Bill Gates and the technology giant IBM have praised Israel for its high quality of education in helping spur Israel's economic development.

=== Healthcare ===
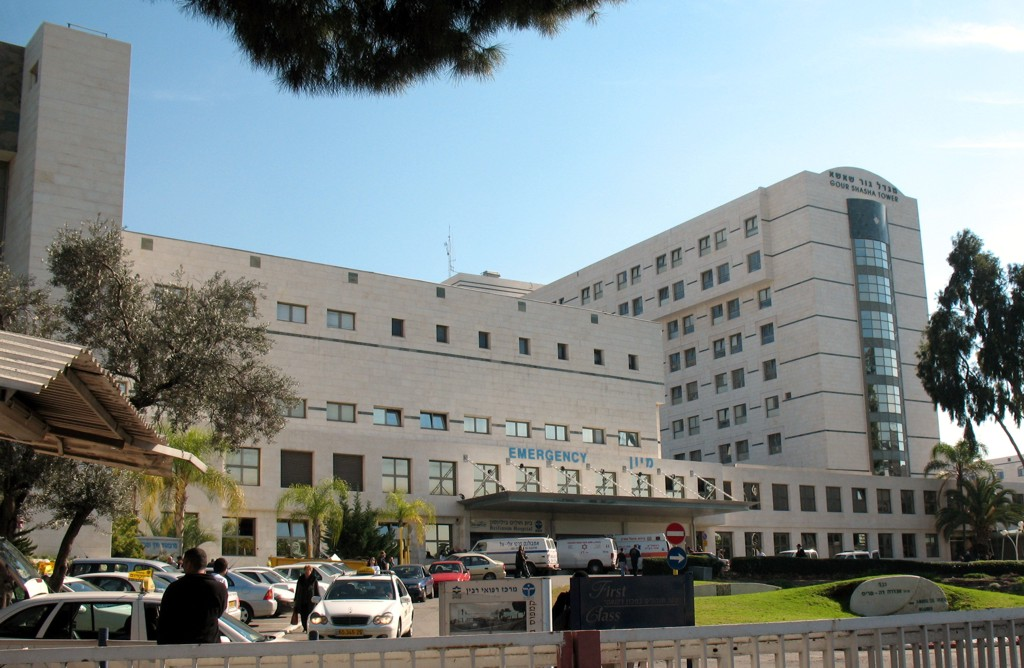
Rabin Medical Center in Petah Tikva, Israel

Israel has universal health care and participation in a medical insurance plan is compulsory. All residents are entitled to basic health care as a fundamental right. The system is based on the National Health Insurance Law of 1995, which mandates all citizens resident in the country to join one of four official health insurance organizations, known as Kupat Holim (קופת חולים - "Patient Funds") which are run as not-for-profit organizations and are prohibited by law from denying any Israeli resident membership. Israelis can increase their medical coverage and improve their options by purchasing private health insurance. In a survey of 48 countries in 2013, Israel's health system was ranked fourth in the world in terms of efficiency, and in 2014 it ranked seventh out of 51. In 2020, Israel's health system was ranked third most efficient in the world. In 2015, Israel was ranked sixth-healthiest country in the world by Bloomberg rankings and as of 2024 had a life expectancy of 81.7 for men and 85.7 for women.

According to a 2025 study published in the Israel Journal of Health Policy Research, Arab citizens of Israel constitute 25% of physicians, 27% of nurses, 27% of dentists and 49% of pharmacists.

=== Telecommunications ===
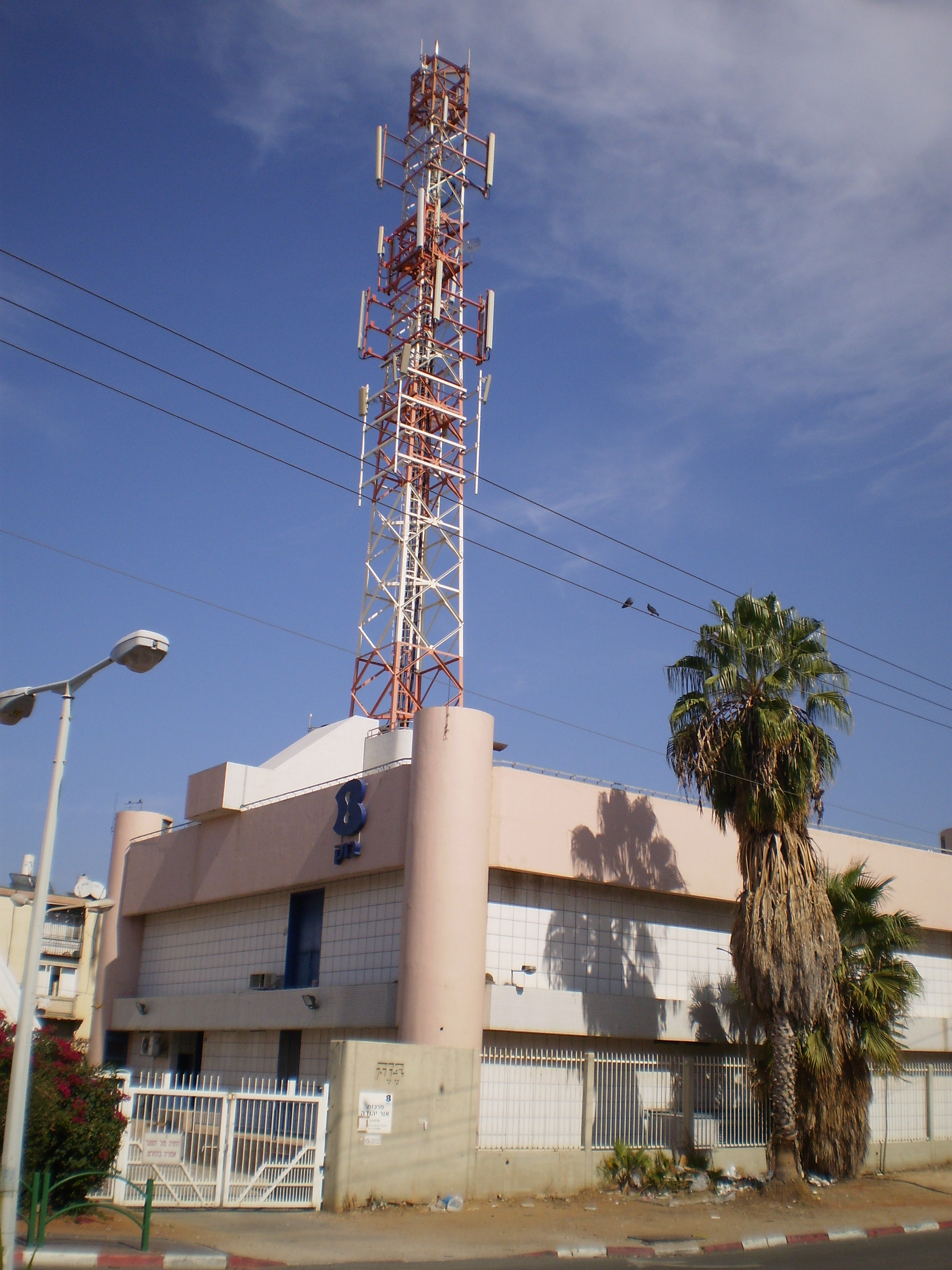
A Bezeq Cellular tower and telephone exchange, located in the town of Or Yehuda.

Telecommunications in Israel are the most developed in the Middle East. Israel's system consists of coaxial cables, optical fibers, and microwave radio relay. Prior to the 1990s, Israel's telecommunication market was dominated by Bezeq, a government-owned corporation. During the 1990s, the Israeli telecommunication industry transitioned from government owned monopolies to diversified private competition by a range of new companies. As of 2014, the telecommunications sector in Israel had revenues over ₪15 billion, representing about 2% of the GDP.

Technology and industry-wise, the Israeli telecom industry has been among global leaders in technology development pioneering developments of protocols such as WiMAX, VoIP and TDMoIP. During the 2000s Israel emerged as a leading supplier for the global telecommunications industry, and a global leader in technological research.

=== Tourism ===
Israel is a major tourist destination, especially for those of Jewish ancestry, with 4.55 million foreign tourists visiting the country in 2019 (about one tourist per two Israelis), yielding a 25% growth since 2016 and contributed ₪20 billion to the economy, making it an all-time record at that time. The most popular paid visited site is Masada.

=== Water supply and sanitation ===
Water supply and sanitation in Israel are intricately linked to the historical development of Israel, because rain falls only in the winter, and largely in the northern part of the country. Irrigation and water engineering are considered vital to the country's economic survival and growth. Large-scale projects to desalinate seawater, direct water from rivers and reservoirs in the north, make optimal use of groundwater, and reclaim flood overflow and sewage have been undertaken. Among them is the National Water Carrier, carrying water from the country's biggest freshwater lake, the Sea of Galilee, to the northern part of the Negev desert through channels, pipes and tunnels. Israel's water demand today outstrips available conventional water resources. Thus, in an average year, Israel relies for about half of its water supply from unconventional water resources, including reclaimed water and desalination. A particularly long drought in 1998–2002 had prompted the government to promote large-scale seawater desalination. In 2022, 86% of the country's drinkable water was produced through desalination of saltwater and brackish water.

As stated by Lifshitz, the director of the Israel Water Authority, in August 2025, the water authority issued a warning regarding a significant drought caused by record-high temperatures, diminished water resources, and the desiccation of northern streams, including the Banias Stream.

== External trade ==
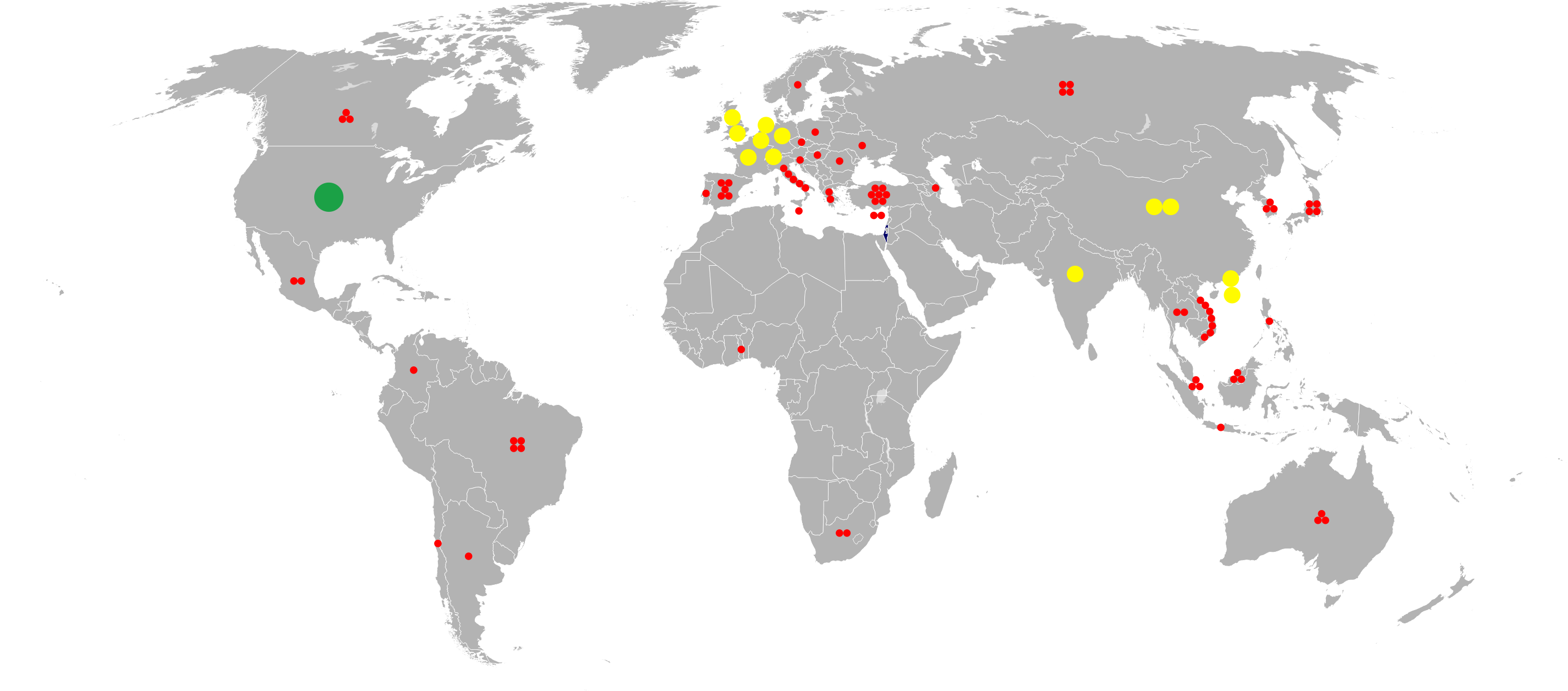
Map of Israeli exports in 2016

Exports of Israel by product category (2019) Chemical products Transportation Machines Mineral products Plastics and rubbers Metals Foodstuffs Precious metals Textiles Instruments Animal products Vegetable products Paper goods Footwear and headwear Miscellaneous Stone and glass Wood products Animal and vegetable bi-products Animal hides Arts and antiques Weapons

In 2016, Israeli goods exports totaled US$55.8 billion. It imported US$61.9 billion worth of goods in the same year. In 2017 total exports (goods and services) amounted to US$102.3 billion, while imports totaled $96.7 billion. Israel usually posts a modest trade deficit in goods. Its main goods imports consist of raw materials, crude oil, production inputs and finished consumer goods. Most of its exports are high-value-added items such as electronic components and other high-technology equipment, tools, and machinery, cut diamonds, refined petrochemicals, and pharmaceuticals. It normally posts a substantial trade surplus in services thanks to tourism and service industries such as software development, engineering services, and biomedical and scientific research and development. Therefore, overall external trade is positive, contributing to a significant current account surplus which as of 2017 stood at 4.7% of GDP.

The United States is Israel's largest trading partner, and Israel is the United States' 26th-largest trading partner; two-way trade totaled some $24.5 billion in 2010, up from $12.7 billion in 1997. The principal U.S. exports to Israel include computers, integrated circuits, aircraft parts and other defense equipment, wheat, and automobiles. Israel's chief exports to the U.S. include cut diamonds, jewelry, integrated circuits, printing machinery, and telecommunications equipment. The two countries signed a free trade agreement (FTA) in 1985 that progressively eliminated tariffs on most goods traded between the two countries over the following ten years. An agricultural trade accord was signed in November 1996, which addressed the remaining goods not covered in the FTA. Some non-tariff barriers and tariffs on goods remain, however. Israel also has trade and cooperation agreements in place with the European Union and Canada, and is seeking to conclude such agreements with a number of other countries, including Turkey, Jordan and several countries in Eastern Europe.

In regional terms, the European Union is the top destination for Israeli exports. In the four-month period between October 2011 and January 2012, Israel exported goods totalling $5 billion to the EU – amounting to 35% of Israel's overall exports. During the same period, Israeli exports to East Asia and the Far East totaled some $3.1 billion.

Until 1995, Israel's trade with the Arab world was minimal due to the Arab League boycott, which was begun against the Jewish community of Palestine in 1945. Arab nations not only refused to have direct trade with Israel (the primary boycott), but they also refused to do business with any corporation that operated in Israel (secondary boycott), or any corporation that did business with a corporation that did business with Israel (tertiary boycott).

In 2013, commercial trade between Israel and the Palestinian territories were valued at US$20 billion annually.

In 2012, ten companies were responsible for 47.7% of Israel's exports. These companies were Intel Israel, Elbit Systems, Oil Refineries Ltd, Teva Pharmaceuticals, Iscar, Israel Chemicals, Makhteshim Agan, Paz Oil Company, Israel Aerospace Industries and the Indigo division of Hewlett-Packard. The Bank of Israel and Israel's Export Institute have warned that the country is too dependent on a small number of exporters.

=== Export destinations and import origins ===
Top ten export destinations for Israel in 2016
	Country/Area	Volume (bln. US $)	% of exports	Primary export(s)
1	United States	17.6	32%	Cut diamonds, medicaments
2	Hong Kong	4.44	8%	Cut diamonds
3	United Kingdom	3.91	7%	Medicaments
4	China	3.33	6%	Electrical equipment, integrated circuits
5	Belgium / Luxembourg	2.51	4.5%	Cut diamonds (as of 2015)
6	India	2.4	4.3%	Cut diamonds
7	Netherlands	2.14	3.8%	Medicaments, computer equipment
8	Germany	1.52	2.7%	Varied
9	Switzerland	1.47	2.6%	Cut diamonds
10	France	1.45	2.6%	Varied
Source: The Observatory of Economic Complexity, MIT

Top ten import origins for Israel in 2016
	Country	Volume (bln. US $)	% of imports	Primary import(s)
1	United States	8.1	13%	Diamonds, electronics
2	China (not including Hong Kong)	5.9	9.5%	Varied
3	Switzerland	4.29	6.9%	Oil, chemicals, diamonds
4	Germany	4.07	6.6%	Varied
5	Belgium / Luxembourg	3.91	6.3%	Diamonds (as of 2015)
6	United Kingdom	3.67	5.9%	Oil
7	Netherlands	2.7	4.4%	Computers and electronics
8	Italy	2.69	4.4%	Varied
9	Turkey	2.6	4.2%	Varied
10	Japan	2.35	3.8%	Cars, photo lab equipment
Source: The Observatory of Economic Complexity, MIT

== Labor ==
Following the ban on Palestinian laborers, the Israeli labor force experienced a severe labor shortage. Migrant workers, historically from Thailand and the Philippines and numbered at more than 300,000 have long been the backbone of Israeli farming, particularly in rural communities and areas near the borders.

== Rankings ==
The Global Competitiveness Report of 2016 to 2017 ranked Israel as having the world's second most innovative economy. It was also ranked 19th among 189 world nations on the UN's Human Development Index. As of 2018, Israel ranks 20th out of 133 countries on the economic complexity index. The IMD World Competitiveness Yearbook of 2016 ranked Israel's economy as world 21st most competitive out of the 61 economies surveyed. The Israeli economy was ranked as the world's most durable economy in the face of crises, and was also ranked first in the rate research and development center investments. The Bank of Israel was ranked first among central banks for its efficient functioning, up from the 8th place in 2009. Israel was ranked first also in its supply of skilled manpower. Israeli companies, particularly in the high-tech area, have enjoyed considerable success raising money on Wall Street and other world financial markets: as of 2010 Israel ranked second among foreign countries in the number of its companies listed on U.S. stock exchanges.

Having moved away from the socialist economic model since the mid-1980s and early 1990s, Israel has made dramatic moves toward the free-market capitalist paradigm. As of 2020, Israel's economic freedom score is 74.0, making its economy the 26th freest in the 2020 Index of Economic Freedom. Israel ranks 35th on the World Bank's ease of doing business index. Israel's economic competitiveness is helped by strong protection of property rights, relatively low corruption levels, and high openness to global trade and investment. Income and corporate tax rates remain relatively high. As of 2020, Israel ranks 35th out of 179 countries in Transparency International's Corruption Perceptions Index. Bribery and other forms of corruption are illegal in Israel, which is a signatory to the OECD Bribery Convention since 2008.

In April 2024, one of the three leading US credit rating agencies, Fitch, issued a warning that the Gaza war could result in a significant decline in Israel's credit metrics. In August 2024, Fitch downgraded Israel's credit rating. The credit rating of Israel was downgraded to Baa1 by another agency, Moody's, in the upcoming month. In October 2024, Israel was also downgraded by the third agency, S&P. In November 2026, S&P rated Israel as A with a stable outlook.

== See also ==
- Bank of Israel
- Boycotts of Israel
- Corruption in Israel
- Disinvestment from Israel
- Economy of the Middle East
- Energy Triangle
- List of companies of Israel
- List of Israeli companies listed on the Nasdaq
- List of Israeli companies quoted on the ASX
- List of Israelis by net worth
- List of largest companies in Israel
- Ministry of Economic Strategy
- Ministry of Economy (Israel)
- Ministry of Finance (Israel)
- National Priority Area
- Privatization in Israel
- Standard of living in Israel
- Taxation in Israel
- Trajtenberg Committee
- Yozma
