= Sabra (car) =

Israeli automobile brand

Sabra was a line of sports cars produced by Autocars Co. Ltd., Israel's first and only volume car manufacturer. Manufactured between 1961 and 1968 (with some assembly continuing later), the Sabra was initially developed in partnership with the British firm Reliant Motors, and marketed primarily for export. Though often associated with Israeli innovation, the Sabra was largely designed and built in the UK before limited assembly operations took place in Israel.

== Origins and Development ==
In 1960, Yitzhak Shubinsky, general manager of Autocars, visited a British automotive exhibition and discovered the Ashley 1172 roadster prototype. Inspired by its design, he collaborated with Reliant to develop a sports car with a fiberglass body and a different chassis. The chassis was supplied by British engineer Leslie Ballamy, while Ford UK provided the powertrains.

Reliant agreed to manufacture the car on the condition it be sold under the name Reliant Sabre. In Israel, however, it was marketed as the Sabra—a term symbolizing both native-born Israelis and the hardy desert cactus, reflecting local pride.

== Design and Features ==
The Sabra Sport was powered by a 1.7-liter 4-cylinder engine producing 61 hp, with later variants reaching 74 and 90 hp. The engine was mounted between the axles to ensure better weight distribution and was paired with a ZF 4-speed manual transmission.

The vehicle featured an unconventional design, including prominent “fang-like” front bumper elements and a coupé version with a roof bulge above the rear windshield. The front suspension used independent springs and trailing arms, while the rear utilized a live axle with leaf springs. Braking was handled by front disc brakes and rear drums.

Despite a top speed of 160 km/h, the car was criticized for poor handling at high speeds. Performance and luxury did not meet expectations, and the car struggled in comparison to European competitors.

== Production and Export ==
The Sabra Sport was unveiled at the 1961 New York Auto Show, where it was promoted as “the first Israeli sports car.” However, in reality, the car was mostly manufactured in the UK. Israel lacked the full production infrastructure, and most Sabras were exported to the United States and Europe.

Only 379 units were produced, and many did not survive. The Sabra Sport was joined by sedan variants branded as Sabra Carmel and Sabra Gilboa, although these models also saw limited success.

== Decline and Legacy ==
While Autocars aspired to create an entirely domestic automobile industry, the company was hindered by:

- Lack of government funding and industrial policy support
- Absence of a full production line in Israel
- Reliance on foreign partners for parts and engineering

In the early 1970s, Autocars filed for bankruptcy. Control of its assets was transferred to Rom Carmel Industries, which also failed within a few years. The last car produced under an Israeli brand left the assembly line in 1981, marking the end of Israel's national car industry.

== Cultural Significance ==
The Sabra remains a nostalgic symbol of Israeli innovation and ambition. A 2021 documentary, Susita, by Avi Weissblei, examined the rise and fall of the Israeli auto industry, including labor unrest and systemic industry challenges.

Today, the Sabra is a rare and cherished collector's item, with surviving units displayed in automotive museums, such as in Athens, Greece—where it sits proudly between legendary brands like Bugatti and Maserati.

== See also ==
- Israel economy
- Autocars Co.
