= Fishing industry in Israel =

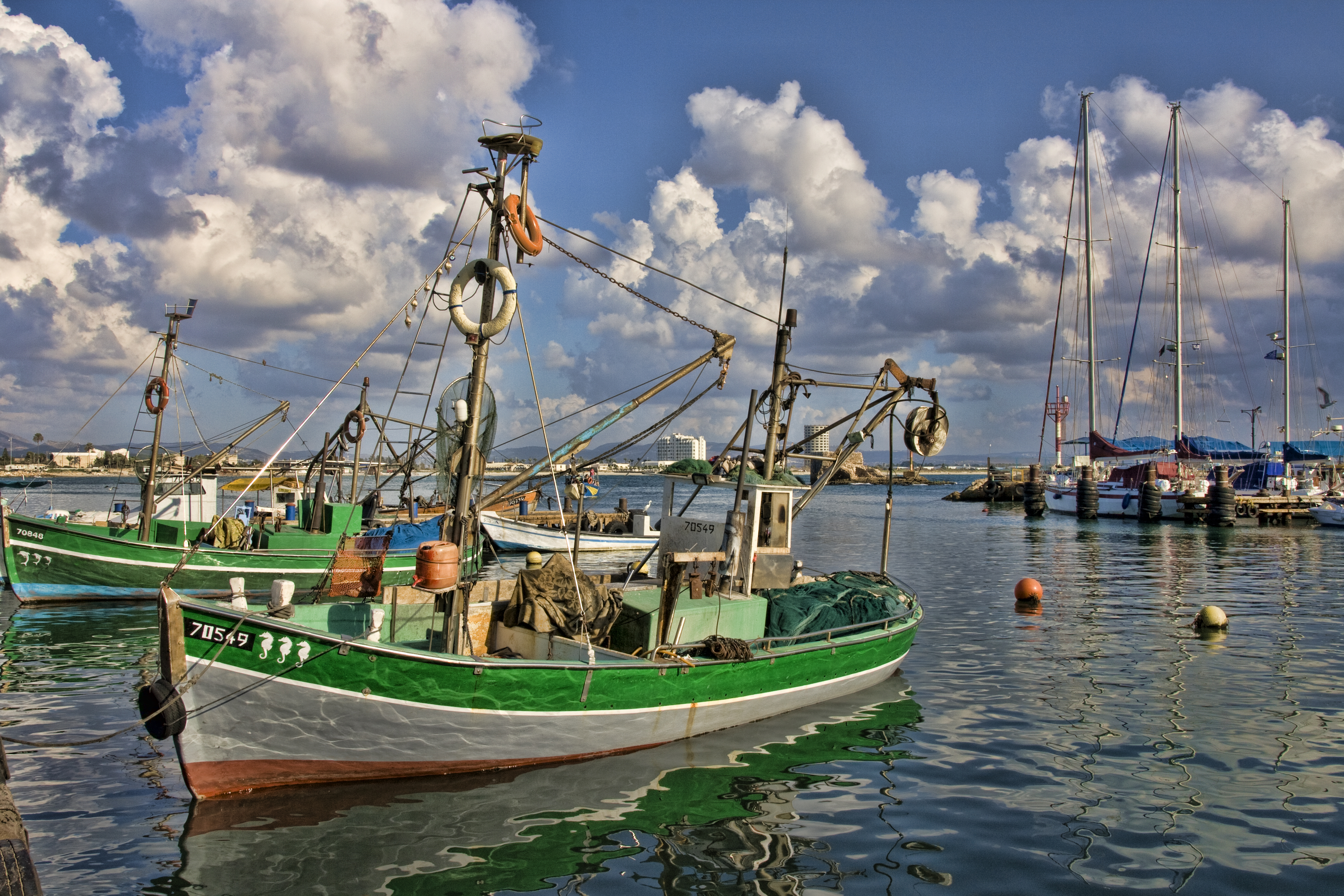
Fishing boats in Acre

Fishing in Israel is a branch of the Israeli economy with historical significance. The three main natural fishing zones are the Mediterranean Sea, the Gulf of Aqaba, and the Kinneret (Sea of Galilee). Lake Hula was formerly a significant fishing area, but it was drained in the 1950s. Aquaculture, the farming of fish in ponds or cages, is also growing in importance.

== History ==
There have been fisheries and fishing activity in the Mediterranean throughout recorded history. The 18 fish species most commercially important in Roman times were species of the family Scombridae, such as thunny, as well as sturgeon, gray mullet, red mullet, hake, Gilthead sea bream and moray. The artisanal fishing methods mentioned in Roman literature remain much the same today. Aristotle, Pliny, Oppian, Varro, Columella, Aelian, Athenaeus, Macrobius, Martial, Ovid and Strabo all attest to an interest in fish and fishing in Roman times. In early 1919, a group of Ahdut Ha'avoda members attempted to establish a fishing industry. The "Pinsk fishermen" arrived in 1922 as a group from the town of Brest. The Shalom Ashkenazi family from Salonika, Greece, formed an independent fishing group. In late 1932, a maritime service company was established, followed by Jewish shipping companies in 1934-1935 such as Lloyd shipping.

In 1936, the Jewish Agency established the Department of Fisheries headed by Bar-Kochba Meirovitch. In 1937, Captain Gustav Fitch was sent on behalf of "Gordonia" to Israel to survey the possibilities for a fishing industry on the coasts of Nahariya and Atlit. Kibbutz Neve Yam engaged in coastal fishing from boats they built themselves. Kibbutz Mishmar Krayot near Haifa Bay engaged in trawl fishing. The only ship of Kibbutz Galil Yam sank off the coast of Ashkelon. When the state was established, the entire Jewish fishing fleet on the Mediterranean consisted of four ships.

After the establishment of the state, fishing cooperatives were established by fishermen who left the kibbutz. The Fisheries Department of the Ministry of Agriculture bought trawlers from the Netherlands, Denmark and England. By 1954 there were 28 fishing boats working off Israel's coasts.

== Mediterranean fishing ==
The Mediterranean is divided at its center into eastern and western basins by an underwater mountain range, which extends between Sicily and Tunisia. There are several differences between the eastern and western basins.

- The eastern basin has a warmer climate than in the western basin. For example, the average temperature during summer over the western basin is 24 °C and in winter is 8 °C, while temperatures along the Israeli coastline in the eastern basin are 29 °C and 13 °C respectively.
- The western basin salinity is 3.5%, while the salinity along the shores of Israel is 3.9%.
- The western basin current flows from the Strait of Gibraltar along the North Africa coast, around Corsica and the Balearic Islands and back to Gibraltar. Although the waters of the western basin current come in from the Atlantic, the shallowness of the Strait of Gibraltar which is only about 800 meters enables transfer only of the nutrient poor upper water layers. Currents in the eastern basin of the Mediterranean are much slower, and move anti-clockwise along the coasts of Libya, Egypt, Israel, Lebanon, Syria, Turkey and Greece. The eastern basin has almost no vertical currents and thus has no mixing between the upper and lower layers of the water. Organic materials derived from dead marine animals and silt from the few rivers in the area sink to the bottom, and in their absence development of microscopic algae (Nanoplankton) that constitute the base of the food chain is prevented.

Ryan (Ryan W.B.), in his article on the Mediterranean in the Encyclopedia of Oceanography, writes: "The Mediterranean is the largest poor water body on the earth." The low quantity of algae is the cause of the low number of fish in the eastern basin of the Mediterranean, although there are regional differences.

The Southeastern area, from Tel Aviv to Port Said, contains clay and minerals deposited by the Nile waters. Consequently, the seabed south of Tel Aviv is relatively shallow, becoming shallower farther south along the coast. For example, the depth of the seabed at a fixed distance off the coast (8 km) changes depending on how far from the Nile Delta it is: being 55 meters off Nahariya, 45 meters off Tel Aviv and only 31 meters off the shores of the Gaza strip. The situation changed starting in 1971 when the Aswan Dam was completed. Since then, most sediment sinks in Lake Nasser, and never reaches the Eastern Mediterranean.

The Northeastern Mediterranean enjoys strong river flows originating from snow thaw in the Taurus Mountains in Anatolia, Turkey. The waters of these rivers bring alluvial deposits rich in nutrients and therefore the amount of fish in this area is relatively large.

The sea off the coast of Israel is especially poor in fish because Israel's rainfall is a small amount and concentrated in a short season, so the amount of nutrient rich water flowing into the sea is low. Winter storms are another key factor in the amount of algal growth. Storms cause raising of nutrients from the bottom of the sea and continental shelf area into the water, and so after the storm subsides, a significant bloom of seaweed appears and gives the water a green tint.

In the Mediterranean there are about 600 known fish species. Digging the Suez Canal in 1869 had a significant impact and today some 55 fish species originating from the Red Sea can be found in the eastern basin of the Mediterranean.

- Ahakiponeime (Mugilidae) known among them a large mullet - Head (mullet - Mugil cephalus - Flathead grey mullet)
- Dakar rocks (grouper, Daor - Epinephelus marginatus - Dusky grouper)
- Sleeping sketches (Vermeer - Lithognathus mormyrus - Striped seabream)
- Memorized string (Sparidae - Dentex gibbosus - Pink dentex).
- Aknatar pesos (sea bass - Spondyliosoma cantharus - Black sea bream)
- Evelan ripple (Sciaenidae - Umbrina cirrosa - Shi drum)

Groundfish (Demersal fish) - fish that find their food on the sea floor or close to it.

- Red mullet (Sultan Ibrahim - Mullus barbatus - mullet Red)
- Striped mullet (sovereign - Mullus surmuletus - mullet Striped red)
- Sea cod - secondary (cod - Merluccius merluccius - Hake)
- Royal morality (Sea Eagle, morality rocks - Argyrosomus regius - Meagre
- Thin sardine (Sardine - Sardinella aurita - Round sardinella)
- Skomberne agile (Plimda white - Scomberomorous commerson - Spanish Mackerel)
- Sting Atlantic (Trolus, Atrahon - Carnax Crysos - Blue runner)
- Sariol Atlantic (Intiasse - Seriola dumerili - Greater amberjack)
- Aramtan blue (Pota - Coryphaena hippurus - Common dolphin-fish)
- Albacore tuna (tuna - Thunnus alalunga - Albacore tuna)

Israeli fishermen margin approximately 3,500 tons of fish every year along the Mediterranean coast.

== Sea of Galilee fishing ==
The Kinneret is the largest natural freshwater lake in the Middle East south of Turkey. The lake is 21 km long and covers 166.7 km² (64.4 sq mi). It has an average depth of 26 m and a maximum depth of 43 m. The average water level is 210.4-m (the lowest fresh water lake in the world).

The lake contains 27 fish species belonging to ten families. Of these, 19 are native and eight were introduced or escaped from fish farms.

- Galil Amnon (Musht Aviad - Sarotherodon galilaeus - Galilee St. Peter's Fish).
- Jordan Amnon (Musht Lubad - Oreochromis aureus - Blue tilapia or Jordan St. Peter's Fish)
- Longhead Barbel (Karsin - Barbus longiceps - Longhead barbel)
- Large scale Barbel (Binit Kishri - Barbus canis - Large scale barbel)
- Hafaf Israeli (Hafafi - Capoeta damascina - Damascus barbel)
- Kinneret Lavnun (Tiberias sardine - Acanthobrama terraesanctae terraesanctae - Kinneret bleak)
- Low Eye Kassif (Kasif - Hypophthalmichthys molitrix - Silver carp)
- Kifon Burri (Mullet - Mugil cephalus - Grey mullet - Burri).
- Common Catfish (Barbout - Clarias gariepinus - Catfish) species of catfish - fish edible, but is not kosher.

The Fishing and Farming Marine Division of the Ministry of Agriculture stocks the lake with the Sea of Galilee Amnon minnow, juvenile silver carp, and juvenile mullet . The annual catch amounts to 60-100 tons of mullet and 70-150 tons of silver carp.

== Eilat fishing ==
Gulf of Aqaba is an extension of a narrow and deep (up to 1830 meters) of the Red Sea. The left the main part of the Red Sea by the Straits of Tiran are beyond the relatively narrow and shallow depth threshold creates about 250 meters. This is similar to the Gulf of Aqaba to the Red Sea itself, connected to the Indian Ocean through the Strait of Bab el Mandeb, which is a narrow and shallow, and depth of 120 meters. Several reasons led to the formation of the Gulf of Aqaba Special conditions: separation between the Red Sea to the Indian Ocean and separation between the Red Sea Gulf of Eilat, the high temperature precipitation minority area. Due to these factors relatively high water temperature (26 °C - 20 °C) salinity Gulf of Eilat is the highest in the world (4.1%). These conditions have created a special habitat where many endemic species have evolved. With the digging of the Suez Canal were many species from the Red Sea to the Mediterranean, a few species (mainly Akbernunim) from the Mediterranean Sea.

Most of the fish families that have economic value found in the Gulf of Eilat are: mackerel (Scombridae), jacks (Carangidae) and mullet (Mugilidae).

== Hula Lake fishing ==
Hula Lake was about 60 km^{2} area created 200,000 years ago, lava from the Golan Heights Achsspach crystallized these volcanic rocks, and hung up the river flow, the Sea of Galilee. Lake was rich in tilapia, catfish and other species, and served as a significant source of fish, which were processed by drying. The lake was drained in the 1950s to fight malaria.

== Fish farming ==
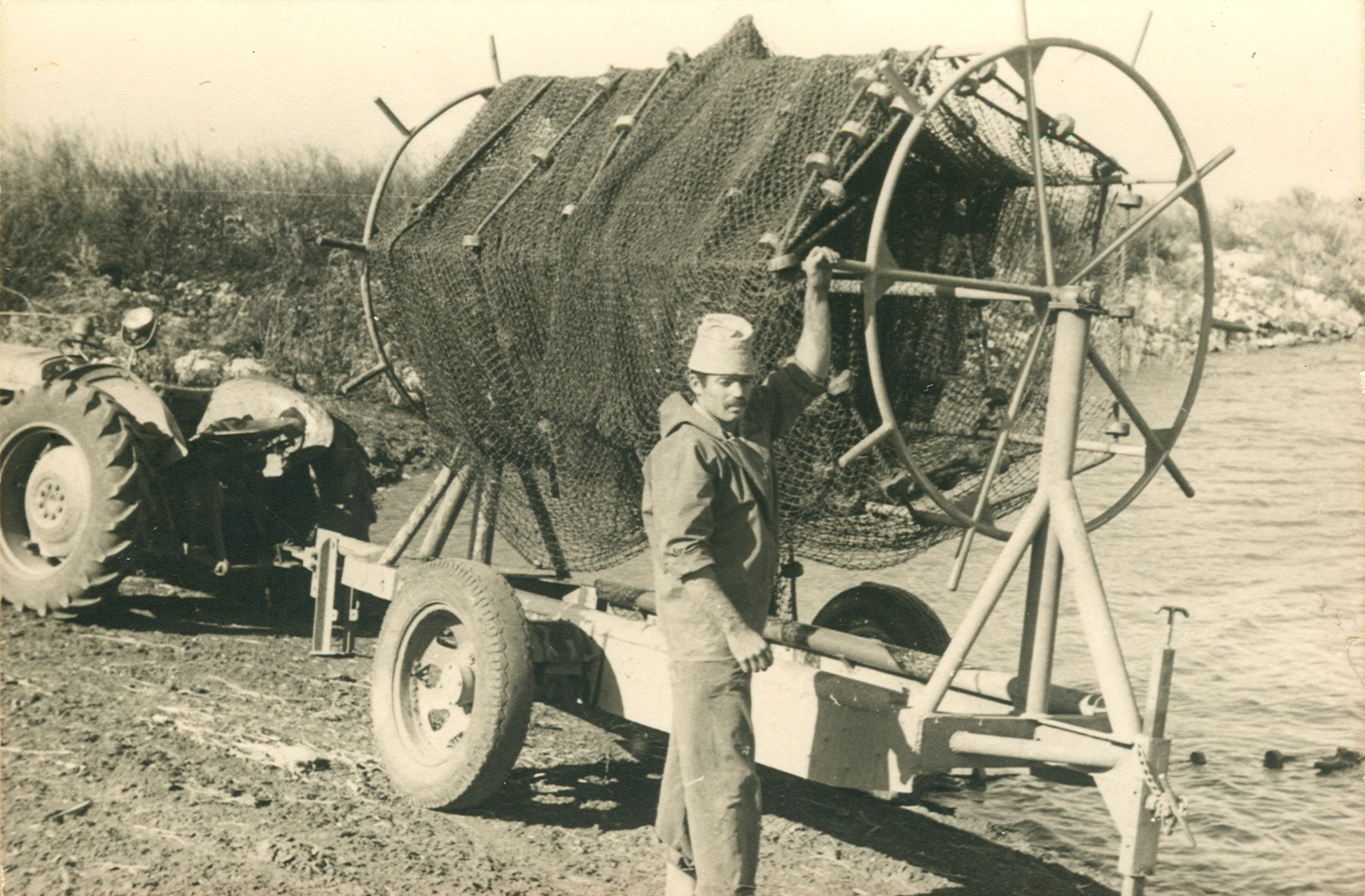
Fish farming in Kibbutz Ramat Yohanan

Kibbutz Nir David was a pioneer of fishing farming in 1939.

- Carp is (carp - Cyprinus carpio - Common carp)
- Eye trout - rainbow (trout, your name - Oncorhynchus mykiss - Rainbow trout)
- Golden Spruce (Dennis, Charles Bird - Sparus aurata - Gilt-head sea bream)

The main fish in fish ponds is a carp with some 8,000 tons. Other fish are Hamanunim about 4,500 tons per year, Kasif mullet. Pools based on the cold waters of the river Dan towers about 600 tons of trout En - Rainbow trout (salmon). Mediterranean Sea and Eilat began to grow from the middle of the 70 Golden Spruce (Dennis) cages crop now exceeds 700 tons per year.

== Fishing in Eilat ==
A man named Rosengart bought a Dutch Fishing Boat. In 1928 the ship passed the Gulf of Aqaba because of the richness of fish in it. However, the smell of fish often wafted phosphorus problems in transporting the fish were created from Eilat to markets in Tel Aviv and Haifa. To overcome the problems brought Rosengart partner in the Frederick Kisch who bought a new ship but the plant failed and in 1934 the ship was sold. And in 1935 was transferred to Haifa [1].

Fishing allowed statehood new area - the Gulf of Aqaba. Eilat fishermen began working groups have been since 1949. Gradually increased the number of groups tuna fishermen fished Plimda also increased gradually seized. The peak was in 1959 in which 540 tons of fish caught, but from 1960 began to decline in the amount of fish caught. In 1963, the fishing pier was built in Eilat by a Turkish fisherman named Mehmet Şevki Alev, but processes such as growth in tourism, shipping and trading bands have gone the fish from the shores of Eilat. Six Day War has expanded the area while fishing the Gulf of Eilat and the seats "Dee gold" and "hypocrisy" have achieved a variety of fine fish, but the agreement with Egypt in 1980 reduced the fishing area off again only to Eilat. Today the fishing industry is edging Eilat fish market in the country.

Eilat has developed in recent years "aquaculture - growing fish in cages in the sea bream. This activity is controversial, dealing with environmental Achsagofim argue that this activity causes an ecological disaster area flora and fauna. The cages are expected to leave the final June 2008, following a government decision about it.

== Open sea fishing ==
During the early years of the state made several attempts to extend the fishing area off the coast coming across regions is relatively poor country Degas. These attempts have been made by several companies established specifically for this:

- Ezra — a pioneer in the fishing distance. Company owned by Ezra Danin and other investors and financing of private entities and government was established in 1950. The company acquired four ships operated them for two years (until it closed) the richest fishing zones of Iceland, Morocco and the Canary Islands.
- Sumrafein — a company of Meir Halevi businessman from Geneva. Her main occupation was led by oil, but in 1958 also tried her luck tuna fishing ship in Japanese leased by another ship named "Edgyat" built in France for this purpose. "Edgyat" transaction in tuna fishing in Ghana through an array of fishing rods. Booty collected was transported refrigerated cargo floor, but it turned out that this project is not economic.
- Atlantic — a company established in 1960 by Brenner and Jacob Meridor word. First bought a trawler in Norway called "Azgied a" working waters of the North and in 1964 was sold after the company ordered two innovative distances fishing ships "Azgied 2" and "Azagied 3" engaged in cod fishing in South - West Africa.
- Jonah — Histadrut company initially carried the name "Nachshon", established in the 30s and engaged primarily in purchasing fishing boats Vbahahcartan land settlement movement. After establishment of the state acquired the fish canning factory "dove" in Tirat Caramel and changed the name of the company responsible for the fishing fleet to "Jonah." In 1961, jointly purchased Sumrafein Jonah ship - fishing got the name "Hiram 1. In 1964, Jonah has acquired the shares Sumrafein ship has at her disposal. It also acquired the activities of ships dock Michael Fields Sea fishing distances involved when they are manned by Ethiopia Ethiopian team. To transport the fish Jonah Eilat acquired the ship "s - end." Gradually it became clear that the activity absorbs Red Sea fish losses because prices were low due to dumping by cheap fish from Atlantic. In 1969 sold "Yonah" the Auniutia Atlantic and the company closed.

== Fisheries Research ==
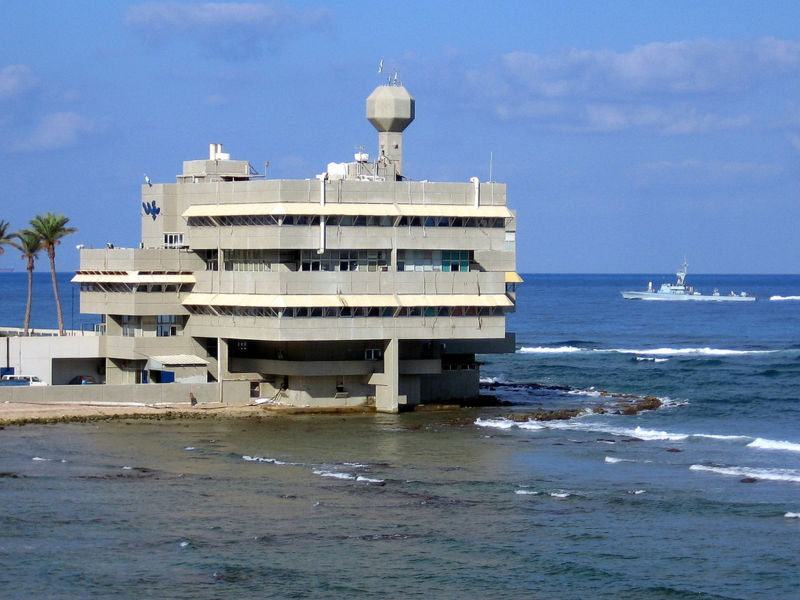
National Institute of Oceanography in Haifa.

Fisheries Research pioneer in Israel was a German Jewish zoologist Dr. Walter Steinitz in 1927 published a comprehensive research on the marine fauna in Israel and briefly established a research laboratory in Nahariya. Encouragement mandatory Fishing Authority has developed the infrastructure for research fishing Fishing Research Institute was established, headed by Dr. R. Libman sitting at Acre. 1938 Exploring Expedition was sent on behalf of Gulf of Aqaba.

In 1946 established "the fishing department of the Agency" Fisheries Research Station "in Haifa port headed by Dr. Lsner, a renowned expert who escaped from Germany when the Nazis came to power. With the station expanded state and its people were researching the biology of fish food. It also Check the data Ahhidrogerfeim different seasons of the sea were its people and to that end occasionally out research trips on boats on the Mediterranean coastline and Gulf of Eilat.

Founded in 1967, the Government of Israel Oceanographic and Limnological Research, headed by Major General (res.) Yochai Ben-Nun, and gradually incorporated most of the departments involved in biological oceanography research of fisheries Research Station. " Departments engaged in fishing technology of the Ministry of Agriculture were in Himte"ed (the unit of fishing technology interface) engaged in fishing gear technology, fisheries surveys.

== Fishing today ==
The total consumption of fish of the State of Israel in 2004 was 65,000 tons of sea fish 65% imported, with most local produce indoor fish ponds.

"Fishing and Agriculture Division of Water Ministry of Agriculture is responsible for granting fishing licenses and fish populations in rehabilitation programs, developing Ahmadgiah attempts to improve fishing technology to reduce the costs of fishing.

Israel’s fishing ports include:

- Joint Acre yacht marina fishing boats. Not far from the marina is the fish market of Acre.
- Tiberias fish market and fishing dock.
- IN is from 1960 at the Kishon fishing dock. Dock fishing including auxiliary services: refrigeration warehouses, warehouse equipment, fish shop and adjacent to a fish market. This anchorage was published as a large group of fishermen sued the authorities in 2003 for negligence that caused the Kishon river pollution, when many of them developed cancer.
- Tel Aviv: Jaffa Port Reading anchorage. At the port of Jaffa is the fish market.
- The fishing port of Ashdod is part of the port.

== See also ==
- Economy of Israel
- Wildlife in Israel
