= List of Israeli companies quoted on the ASX =

As of 2019, 15 Israeli companies were listed on the Australian Securities Exchange. Nearly all achieved their listings via a so-called "back-door listing" where a currently-listed entity is used as a shell to house the new entity.

The ASX has traditionally hosted a large number of relatively small and early-stage companies due to a long history of mining exploration ventures in Australia. Accordingly, companies with market capitalization of as little as $5–$10m are able to list on the ASX and are not restricted to a secondary market- they list on the main exchange. This enables more liquidity than might be achieved on a US secondary market. Technology firms often seek relatively large amounts of capital to rapidly scale while still at modest market capitalizations. So smaller securities exchanges abroad (Singapore is another purported example) can be a favourable if unexpected option for listing, despite the geographical distance from their original base. Another perceived advantage is the absence of any cap on executive remuneration in Australia whereas such caps exist in Israel.

Performance of the companies has been mixed since the initiative began in 2016, with Weebit Nano the most successful of these companies as of 2024. Nevertheless Coby Hanoch, the CEO of Weebit Nano has expressed his desire to delist from the ASX when able to do so, saying the ASX is “50 years behind the world in dealing with technology and in dealing with the regulation.”.

== List of Israeli companies currently or previously quoted on ASX ==
This is a list of Israeli companies quoted or previously quoted on the Australian Securities Exchange as of August 2024.

Name	Ticker Symbol	Year Listed	Sector	Products / Solutions	Notes
Mobilicom	MOB	2017	Telecommunications		
G Medical Innovations Holdings (delisted 2020)	GMV	2017	Digital Healthcare		
Audio Pixels Holdings	AKP	2004	Consumer Durables		
Fluence Corporation	FLC	2007	Industrial Technology		
Weebit Nano	WBT	2016	Semiconductor Technology		
MMJ Phyto Tech	MMJ	2015	Healthcare	Medical Cannabis	
Elsight	ELS	2017	Communications		
e-Sense Lab (delisted 2021)	ESE	2017	Healthcare	Medical Cannabis	
Dragontail Systems (delisted 2021)	DTS	2017	Logistics	Algo, delivery optimization software	
HearMeOut (delisted 2020)	HMO	2016	Social media	Audio-based social media	
Ultracharge (delisted/renamed ASX:SUV 2020)	UTR	2016	Battery technology		
MGC Pharmaceuticals (delisted 2020)	MXC	2015	Medical Cannabis		
Dotz Nano Ltd	DTZ	2016	Nanotechnology	Graphene quantum dots	
Sky and Space Global (delisted 2021)	SAS	2016	Space technology	Nanosatellites	
Splitit (delisted 2023)	SPT	2019	Software and information technology	merchandise financing	
AppsVillage Australia Ltd (delisted 2022)	APV				
Creso Pharma (now Melodiol Global, ME1)	CPH				
Delta Drone International (now Rocket DNA, RKT)	DLT				
Heramed Corporation	HMD				
Nutritional Growth Solutions Ltd	NGS				
Roots Sustainable Agricultural Technologies Ltd	ROO				
Shekel Brainweigh Ltd	SBW				
Security Matters Ltd	SMX				
Way 2 VAT Ltd	W2V				
