= National Priority Area =

Within Israel, the term National Priority Area (NPA) refers to several municipal areas that have been designated to receive additional economic and security support from the Israeli government. Benefits granted to these areas include increased funding for education, cultural programs, sporting activities, and environmental protection.

== Purpose ==
The Israeli government has articulated several goals of the NPA program; these include "population dispersal in the State of Israel", an increase in "the population of the periphery and of areas near the border" of Israel, and to "preserve and bolster Israel's national security stamina." Given its implications for the ongoing territorial disputes involving Israel, the program has attracted controversy. Adalah, a human rights organization focused on Palestinian inhabitants of Israel has asserted that the government's process for selecting new NPAs is discriminatory towards Arab citizens of Israel. Under the administration of Prime Minister Ehud Olmert the expansion of the NPA program into Israeli settlements was temporarily halted under the assumption that the settlements would be evacuated should a plan for a two-state solution involving Israel and Palestine be finalized. However, Olmert's successor, Prime Minister Benjamin Netanyahu has since continued the NPA program and successfully proposed the addition of several Israeli settlements as NPAs.
