= Asseco =

Polish technology company

Asseco Poland S.A.

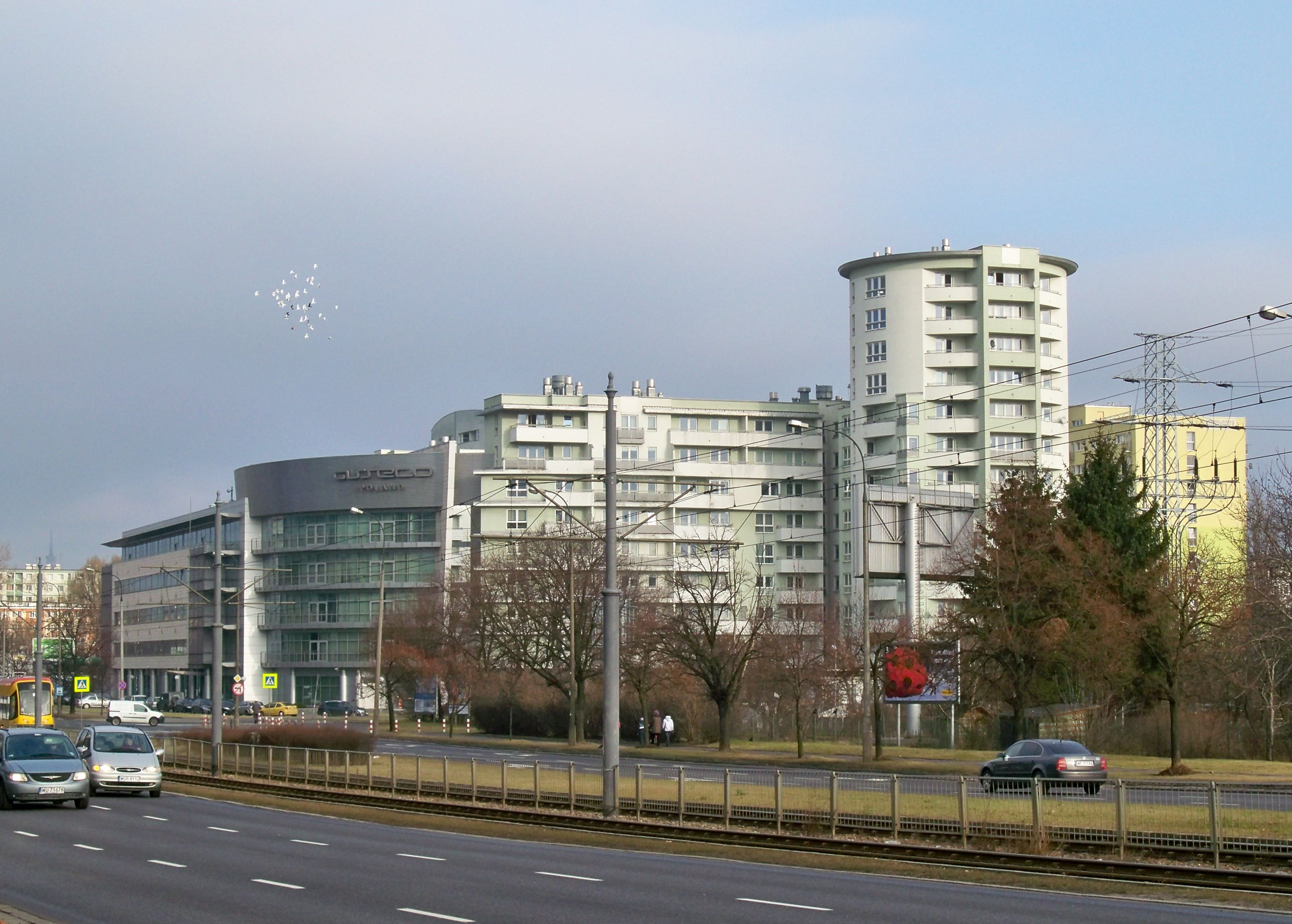
- A branch of Asseco Poland SA at 127 Grójecka Street in Warsaw
- Type: Public (Spółka Akcyjna)
- ISIN: PLSOFTB00016
- Industry: Information technology
- Founded: 1991; 35 years ago
- Founder: Adam Góral
- Headquarters: Rzeszów, Poland, Rzeszów, Subcarpathian Voivodeship, Poland
- Area served: Worldwide
- Key people: Adam Góral (CEO)
- Revenue: ▲ zł 17.3 billion (2024)
- Operating income: ▲ zł 1.6 billion (2024)
- Net income: ▲ zł 500 million (2024)
- Total assets: ▲€2,4 billion (2023)
- Number of employees: 33,752 (2024)
- Website: www.asseco.pl

Asseco Poland S.A. is a Polish multinational software company which develops enterprise software primarily for the banking and finance industries. Founded in 1991 and headquartered in Rzeszów, Poland, Asseco is one of the largest technology companies listed on the Warsaw Stock Exchange (WSE) and a component of the WIG20 stock market index. The company operates in over 60 countries and employs approximately 33,700 people worldwide. Asseco is the largest software house in Central and Eastern Europe. As of early 2025, the shareholder structure underwent significant changes after Cyfrowy Polsat, previously the largest shareholder, sold the majority of its stake to the Dutch investment entity Yukon Niebieski Kapital B.V.

== History ==
Asseco was founded as COMP Rzeszów in 1991 by Adam Goral. It began as a ketchup factory, but Goral focused on the development of the manufacturer's information technology department, which soon became the center of the business. The company became multinational with the 2004 purchase of the Slovak company Asset Soft, and the company was renamed Asseco. It continued to make acquisitions, purchasing the Polish software companies Softbank and Prokom, and ventured outside of the former Eastern Bloc with a 2010 purchase of the Israeli NASDAQ-listed software company Formula Systems. It has since expanded to a presence in over 50 countries.

In 2015, Asseco acquired the Portuguese company Exictos SGPS operating in Portugal as well as Portuguese-speaking countries in Africa including Angola, Mozambique and Cape Verde.

In 2017, the company established Asseco International, a holding which would be responsible for the management, supervision and support of Asseco Group companies operating on the international markets.

In 2018, the company entered the Philippines market by acquiring a 60% stake in the Kraków-based company Nextbank Software Sp. z o.o., which provides IT solutions for the banking sector in the country. In the same year, Asseco-owned Formula Systems acquired a number of companies in the United States including Adaptik, Alius Corp and PVBS.

In 2019, Asseco acquired 51% of shares in the Spanish IT company Tecsisa which provides services for the energy sector as well as 69.01% of shares in ComCERT which specializes in the provision of cybersecurity services.

In 2020, the company entered the German banking market by establishing Adesso Banking Solutions GmbH in partnership with the German Adesso company specializing in systems for insurance sector firms and bank consulting. I the same year, the company was ranked 55th in the CEE Top 500 ranking compiled by Coface, which lists the largest companies in Central and Eastern Europe.

In 2021, Asseco PST, a subsidiary of Asseco, acquired a majority stake in the equity of Finantech, a Portuguese company headquartered in Porto specializing in software solutions for capital markets.

In 2022, Asseco Data Systems, a subsidiary of Asseco, acquired a majority stake in the Kraków-based IT company Pirios, a leading provider of customer services automation in Poland.

== Structure of the company ==
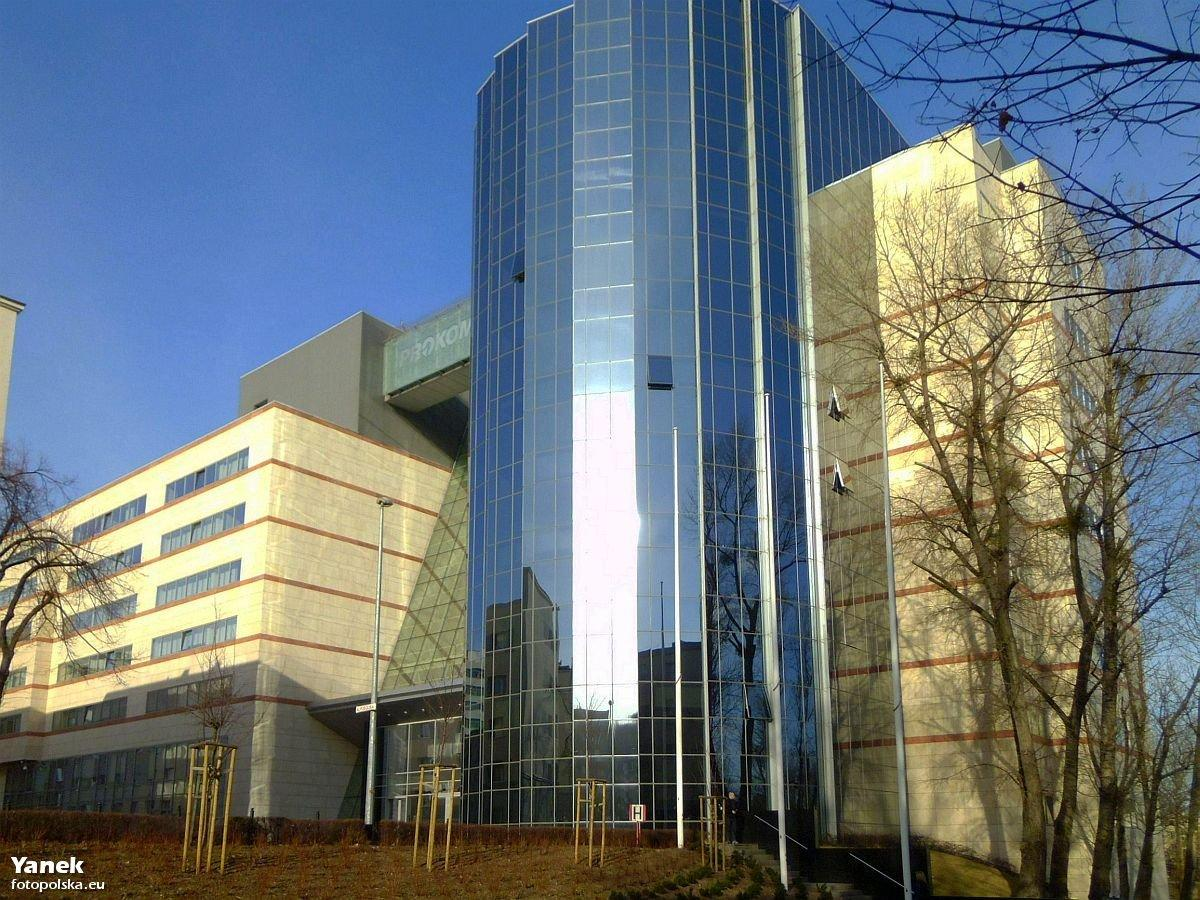
Asseco Poland office in Gdynia

The Asseco Group operates as a federation of companies led by Asseco Poland. The structure is organized into geographical and functional divisions:

- Asseco Poland: The parent company responsible for the domestic market and group strategy.
- Asseco International: A holding company managing operations in Western Europe, including Asseco Spain, Asseco Denmark, and Asseco PST (Portugal/Africa).
- Asseco South Eastern Europe (ASEE): A separate entity listed on the Warsaw Stock Exchange, covering the Balkans, Turkey, and Romania.
- Formula Systems: An Israeli holding company listed on NASDAQ and TASE, which includes major subsidiaries such as Matrix, Sapiens, and Magic Software.
- Asseco Data Systems: A specialized subsidiary focused on IT services, mass print, and digital trust services.
- Asseco Business Solutions: A subsidiary providing ERP software for small and medium enterprises.

== Sponsorship ==
Asseco is an active sponsor of sports teams in Poland:

- Asseco Resovia, a professional volleyball team based in Rzeszów.
- Asseco Arka Gdynia, a professional basketball team based in Gdynia.

== See also ==
- Warsaw Stock Exchange
- WIG30
- Economy of Poland
