= TA BlueTech Index =

Israeli stock market index

The TA BlueTech Index is a stock market index all capitalised information technology and biotechnology companies listed on the Tel Aviv Stock Exchange (TASE). The index was launched on 3 April 2011 as the TA BlueTech-50 Index and replaced by the Tel-Tech Index and the Tel-Tech 15 Index. In June 2014, as a result of changes in the criteria required for companies to be listed in the Index, its name was changed to "TA BlueTech Index".

== History ==
The TA BlueTech-50 Index was launched as part of an effort by the Tel Aviv Stock Exchange to transform itself into a leading global exchange for high-tech companies and lure more overseas investment. Additionally, the Exchange has hoped to attract Israeli technology companies that historically been listing on the NASDAQ to list in TASE. The TA-Technology Index, which includes all the Information Technology companies listed on TASE, was launched at the same time. The TA-Biomed Index, which includes all the Biotechnology and Biomedical engineering companies om TASE was launched one year earlier. The BlueTech-50 included the 50 most highly capitalised companies from both indices.

In May 2014, the Tel Aviv Stock Exchange launched a new Index called TA Tech-Elite Index, comprising all the companies listed on either TA-Biomed Index or TA-Technology Index with a market worth of at least 400 million NIS. Also, in order to attract new companies, it was decided that under some circumstances new companies will be allowed to be listed on Tech-Elite Index if their market worth is at least 200 million NIS.

In accordance with the launching of Tech-Elite, it was decided that the BlueTech index will include all companies listed on TA-Technology Index and TA-Biomed Index, starting 15 June 2014.

== Constituents ==
Constituents of the TA BlueTech-50 Index as of 1 September 2011

Name	Symbol	Sector	Notes
Allot Communications	ALLT	Communication systems	Dual listed on NASDAQ
Alvarion	ALVR	Communication systems	Dual listed on NASDAQ
Aposense	APOS	Biomedical engineering	
Arad Group	ARD	Water technology	
Audiocodes	AUDC	Communication systems	Dual listed on NASDAQ
Babylon	BBYL	Software	
Bio-Cell	BCEL	Biotech holding company	
BioLineRx	BLRX	Biomedical engineering	Dual listed on NASDAQ
Brainsway	BRIN	Biomedical engineering	
Camtek Intelligent Imaging	CAMT	Semiconductors	Dual listed on NASDAQ
Can-Fite BioPharma	CFBI	Biopharmaceuticals	
Ceragon	CRNT	Communication systems	Dual listed on NASDAQ
Clal Biotech	CBI	Biomedical engineering	
Commtouch	CTCH	Software	Dual listed on NASDAQ
Compugen	CGEN	Biomedical engineering	Dual listed on NASDAQ
D-Pharm	DPRM	Biomedical engineering	
Elbit Systems	ESLT	Aerospace & Defense	Dual listed on NASDAQ
Elron	ELRN	Holding company	Dual listed on NASDAQ
Evogene	EVGN	Agrotechnology	
EZchip	EZCH	Semiconductors	Dual listed on NASDAQ
Formula Systems	FORT	Holding company	Dual listed on NASDAQ
Gilat Satellite Networks	GILT	Communication systems	Dual listed on NASDAQ
Given Imaging	GIVN	Medical imaging	Dual listed on NASDAQ
Hilan Tech	HLTC	Information technology	
Intec Pharm	INTP	Biomedical engineering	
Itamar Medical	ITMR	Medical equipment	
Kamada	KMDA	Biomedical engineering	
LivePerson	LPSN	Software	Dual listed on NASDAQ
Magic Software Enterprises	MGIC	Software	Dual listed on NASDAQ
Matrix IT	MTRX	Information technology	
Maytronics	MTRN	Water technology	
Mellanox	MLNX	Semiconductors	Dual listed on NASDAQ
NICE Systems	NICE	Information technology	Dual listed on NASDAQ
Nova Measuring Instruments	NVMI	Semiconductors	Dual listed on NASDAQ
O.R. Technologies	ORTC	Fuel retail	
ONE Software	ONE	Software	
Orbit	ORBI	Satellite communication	
Orckit Communications	ORCT	Communication systems	Dual listed on NASDAQ
Ormat	ORMT	Renewable energy	Dual listed on NASDAQ
Perion Network	PERI	Software	Dual listed on NASDAQ
PhotoMedex, Inc.	PHMD	Biomedical engineering	Dual listed on NASDAQ
Pluristem Therapeutics	PSTI	Biomedical engineering	Dual listed on NASDAQ
Prior-tech Group	PRTC	Holding company	
PROLOR Biotech	PBTH	Biomedical engineering	Dual listed on AMEX
Protalix BioTherapeutics	PLX	Biomedical engineering	Dual listed on AMEX
Radvision	RVSN	Communication systems	Dual listed on NASDAQ
Retalix	RTLX	Software	Dual listed on NASDAQ
Silicom Connectivity Solutions	SILC	Information technology	Dual listed on NASDAQ
Spectronix	SPCT	Fire detection systems	
Tower Semiconductor	TSEM	Semiconductors	Dual listed on NASDAQ

== See also ==
- Economy of Israel
- Silicon Wadi
- List of Israeli companies quoted on the Nasdaq
