= EZT =

EZT may refer to:

- Endron Zymithium Trisistaline, a fictional substance used in Swarm (1998 video game)
- ICAO code for Ezy Airlines, an airline of Thailand
- Entergy Texas, Inc., a company listed on the New York Stock Exchange
- EZT, stage name of Colin Michael Gagon, primary artist in Sarabeth Tucek's recording debut
