= Martin Gerstel =

Israeli businessman (born 1941)

- מרטין גרסטל
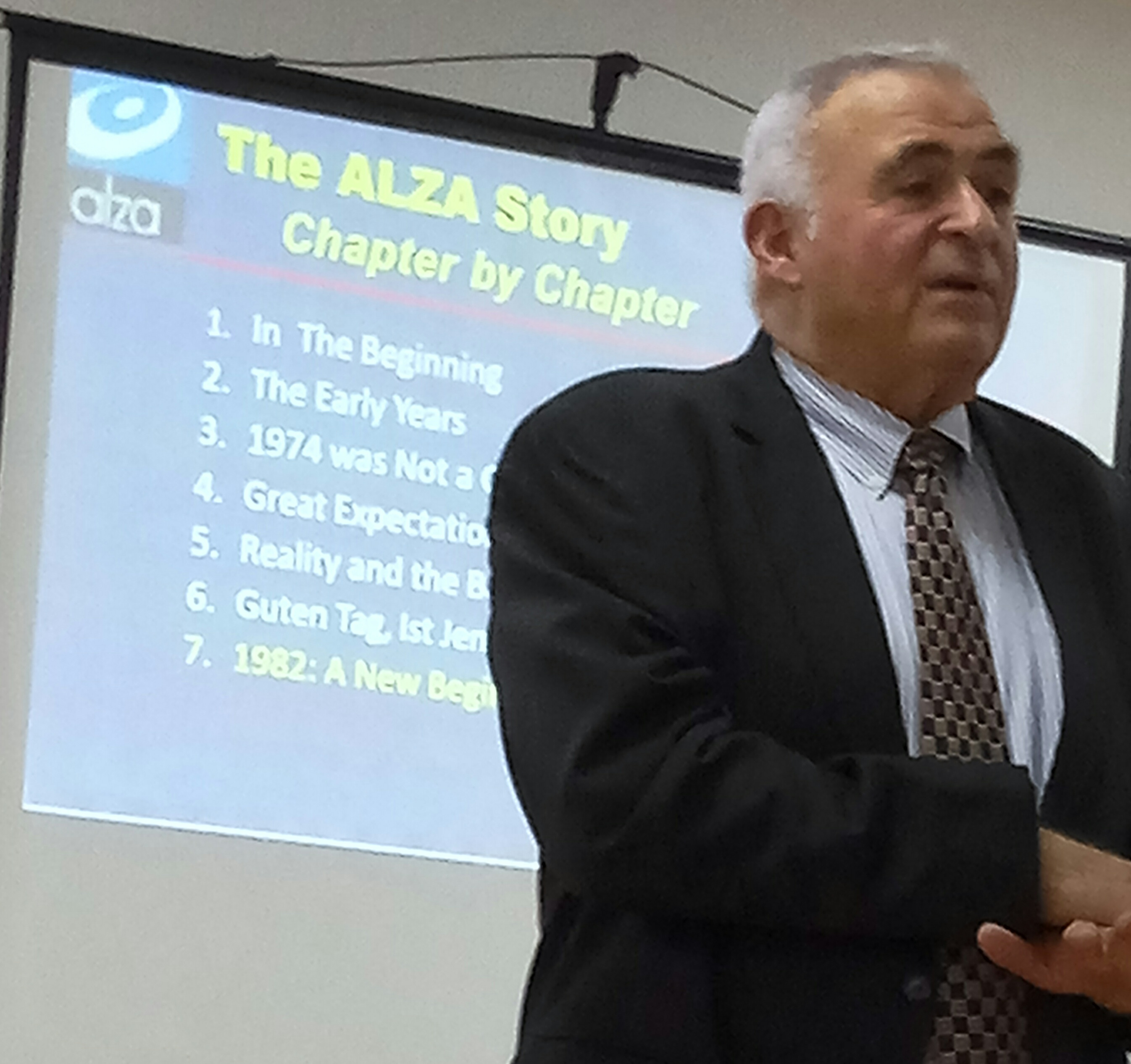
- Born: June 26, 1941 (age 85) Norwalk Connecticut
- Education: Yale University, Stanford Graduate School of Business
- Occupation: Businessman

Martin Gerstel (Hebrew: מרטין גרסטל; born June 26, 1941) is an Israeli businessman. He was the CEO and co-chairman of Alza Corp. Martin Gerstel founded ALZA Corp. and Itamar Medical Ltd. M

== History ==
Gerstel attended Yale University from which he received his undergraduate degree. He went on to receive an MBA from Stanford Graduate School of Business.

Gerstel held the position of Co-CEO of Compugen Ltd. and chairman for Keddem Bioscience Ltd. He founded ALZA Corp at which he was a chief executive and financial officer. He is the chairman of Compugen (Israeli company), Evogene, Keddem Bioscience, Mada Ltd.

Gerstel is the co-founder and co-chairman of Itamar Medical. He served as a director of Yissum Research Development Company of Hebrew University Ltd., Yeda Ltd. and the Foundation for the U.S. National Medals of Science and Technology.

Gerstel is a member of the Board of Governors and the Executive Committee of the Weizmann Institute of Science and the Board of Governors of The Hebrew University of Jerusalem. He is an advisor to the Burrill Life Science Funds and the board of the Israel-U.S. Binational Industrial Research and Development Foundation ("BIRD").

Gerstel is the Chairman of a cybersecurity company preventing DDoS attacks, MazeBolt Technologies Ltd.
