= Companies listed on the New York Stock Exchange (E) =

== E ==
Stock name	Symbol	Country of origin
E. I. du Pont de Nemours and Company (DuPont)	DD	US
E. W. Scripps Company	SSP	US
Eagle Materials	EXP	US
Eastgroup Properties	EGP	US
Eastman Chemical Company	EMN	US
Eastman Kodak	KODK	US
Eaton Corporation	ETN	US
Eclipse Resources Corporation	ECR	US
Ecolab	ECL	US
Ecopetrol	EC	Colombia
Edison International	EIX	US
Education Realty Trust	EDR	US
Edwards Lifesciences	EW	US
El Paso Electric	EE	US
El Paso Pipeline Partners	EPB	US
Eldorado Gold	EGO	Canada
Eli Lilly and Company	LLY	US
Ellie Mae	ELLI	US
Ellington Financial	EFC	US
Ellington Credit Company	EARN	US
Embraer	ERJ	Brazil
Emcor	EME	US
Emerge Energy Services	EMES	US
Emergent BioSolutions	EBS	US
Emeritus Senior Living	ESC	US
Emerson Electric	EMR	US
Empire District Electric Company	EDE	US
Empire State Realty Trust	ESRT	US
Employers Holdings	EIG	US
Edenor	EDN	Argentina
Emulex	ELX	US
Enable Midstream Partners, LP	ENBL	US
Enbridge	ENB	Canada
Endeavour Silver Corp.	EXK	Canada
Endesa Chile	EOC	Chile
Endurance Specialty Holdings	ENH	Bermuda
Enduro Royalty Trust	NDRO	US
Energizer	ENR	US
Energy Transfer Partners	ET	US
Enerplus	ERF	Canada
Enersis	ENI	Chile
EnerSys	ENS	US
Eni	E	Italy
Ennis, Inc.	EBF	US
EnPro Industries	NPO	US
Entergy	ETR	US
Enterprise Products	EPD	US
Entravision Communications	EVC	US
Envestnet, Inc.	ENV	US
Envision Healthcare Holdings	EVHC	US
Enzo Biochem	ENZ	US
EOG Resources	EOG	US
EP Energy Corporation	EPE	US
EPAM Systems	EPAM	US
EPR Properties	EPR	US
EQT Corporation	EQT	US
Equifax	EFX	US
Equity Lifestyle Properties	ELS	US
Equus Total Return	EQS	US
Era Group	ERA	US
Eros International	EROS	US
Esco Technologies	ESE	US
Essent Group	ESNT	US
Essex Property Trust	ESS	US
Estée Lauder Companies	EL	US
Esterline	ESL	US
Ethan Allen	ETH	US
EverBank	EVER	US
Evercore Partners	EVR	US
Everest Re	RE	US
Evertec	EVTC	US
Everyday Health	EVDY	US
Evogene	EVGN	US
ExamWorks Group	EXAM	US
Exar Corporation	EXAR	US
Exelis Inc.	XLS	US
Exelon	EXC	US
Express, Inc.	EXPR	US
Exterran Holdings	EXH	US
Extra Space Storage	EXR	US
ExxonMobil	XOM	US
