= Anat Cohen-Dayag =

Israeli business woman

- ענת כהן-דייג
- Education: Weizmann Institute of Science; Ben-Gurion University
- Scientific career
- Fields: Biochemist

Anat Cohen-Dayag (Hebrew: ענת כהן-דייג) is an Israeli businesswoman. She is president and chief executive officer of the Israeli biotechnology firm Compugen Ltd, a company involved in drug discovery. She previously worked as a scientist at the R&D department of Orgenics.

== Education ==
She holds a B.Sc. in biology from the Ben-Gurion University, and has obtained an MSc in Chemical Immunology and a PhD in Biological Chemistry from the Weizmann Institute of Science.
