= BIRD Foundation =

Organization in Tel Aviv, Israel

The Israel-United States Binational Industrial Research and Development (BIRD) Foundation is an organization that provides capital for joint industrial research and development (R&D) between American and Israeli companies. BIRD was established in 1977 by the governments of the United States and Israel.

Each BIRD project involves a partnership between a U.S. and an Israeli company. Up to 50 percent of the funding is supplied by BIRD and at least 50 percent by the partnership. The source of the funding is an endowment provided equally by the two governments. The current BIRD endowment is $110 million. BIRD also receives annual funding from both governments for the BIRD Energy program.

Since its inception, BIRD has approved more than 900 projects, provided more than $300M in grants (~$500M adjusted to inflation). BIRD projects have yielded an estimated $10B in sales. The BIRD Foundation is considered by some analysts to be a successful model of binational R&D collaboration.

== Early history ==
In July 1974, the US and Israeli governments established a joint Committee for Investment and Trade, staffed by representatives of the two governments. Its task was to find ways to promote closer economic ties between the two nations, with discussions being held throughout 1975 and early 1976. The initial agreement to establish the BIRD Foundation was signed by U.S. Secretary of the Treasury William E. Simon and Israel Finance Minister Yehoshua Rabinowitz, on March 3, 1976.

In February 1975 a private sector group was formed to promote closer links between U.S. and Israeli scientific and technological enterprises. This group, composed of leading research and development executives from both U.S. and Israeli industry, was instrumental in providing advice and support to the Joint Committee during negotiations for the establishment of the Foundation. As discussions continued between the two governments, another significant private sector initiative was taking place. The Committee for the Economic Growth of Israel (CEG-I) was formed during March 1976, as an autonomous, voluntary organization of American and Israeli business people who joined forces to promote exports and investment in Israel.

In late April 1977, the U.S. Congress passed the legislation providing the funding for BIRD. This was signed by President Jimmy Carter on May 4, 1977. At the same time the Knesset authorized the funding of the Israeli portion of the BIRD endowment.

BIRD was formally established in a ceremony in Washington DC on May 18, 1977, with the exchange of letters between Assistant Secretary of the Treasury C. Fred Bergsten and Israeli Ambassador Simcha Dinitz.

BIRD started with an endowment of $60 million; $30 million from each country. In 1984, the endowment was increased to $110 million.

== Leadership ==
BIRD is managed by a Board of Governors (BOG) which appoints an Executive Director. The BOG consists of six members, three from each country, representing the Departments of Commerce, State and Treasury (U.S.), the Ministry of Economy and Industry and Ministry of Finance (Israel). The co-Chairmen of the BOG are a senior official from the U.S. National Institute of Standards and Technology (NIST) and the Chief Scientist of the Israel Ministry of Economy and Industry.

The following is the list of BIRD Executive Directors since inception:

Name	Term
A. Wade Blackman Jr.	1977–1979
Dr. Ed Mlavsky	1979–1993
Dan Vilenski	1993–1997
Dov Hershberg	1997–2005
Dr. Eitan Yudilevich	2006–Present

== Procedures ==
BIRD approves projects twice a year, in June and in December.

Any pair of companies, one Israeli and one American, may jointly apply for BIRD support, so long as they have the combined capability and infrastructure to define, develop and commercialize innovative products based on industrial R&D. BIRD offers "conditional grants" for joint development projects. BIRD funds up to 50% of each company's R&D expenses associated with the joint project (up to a maximum of $1M per approved project). Repayments are due only if commercial revenues are generated as a direct result of the project.

The BIRD Energy program sponsored by the U.S. Department of Energy and the Israel Ministry of National Infrastructure, Energy and Water Resources, approves projects once a year.

== See also ==
- Economy of Israel
- Science and technology in Israel
- Martin Gerstel
