= Compugen Ltd. =

Israeli biotechnology company

- Type: Public
- Traded as: Nasdaq: CGEN; TASE: CGEN
- Industry: Biotechnology
- Founded: 1993; 33 years ago
- Founder: Eli Mintz; Simchon Faigler; Amir Natan
- Headquarters: Holon, Israel
- Key people: Eran Ophir (president & CEO); Anat Cohen-Dayag (chairman)
- Revenue: ▼US$ 53 thousand (2016)
- Operating income: ▼US$ -8.7 million (2016)
- Net income: ▼US$ -8.5 million (2016)
- Website: cgen.com

Compugen Ltd. (Hebrew: קומפיוג'ן) is a clinical-stage publicly traded predictive drug discovery and development company headquartered in Israel, with shares traded on the NASDAQ Capital Market and on the Tel Aviv Stock Exchange. Compugen was established as computational drug discovery service provider in 1993. Compugen originally acted as service provider for pharma companies, supplying its software and computational services to predict different types of biological phenomena. It had arrangements with big companies such as Novartis AG, Abbot Laboratories and Pfizer Inc. Subsequently, Compugen made a decision to become a drug development company with its own internal pipeline, and in 2010, decided to a focus on oncology and immunology. OncoMed Pharmaceuticals and Five Prime Therapeutics are among Compugen's competitors.

== History ==
Compugen was founded by Eli Mintz, Simchon Faigler and Amir Natan. Mintz conceived of the idea for the company in 1991 while accompanying his wife, Liat Mintz, to a genomics engagement at the Pasteur Institute in France. She commented that the quantities of data being produced by scientists involved in DNA sequencing exceeded what computers could process at reasonable speeds. Eli Mintz partnered with colleagues Faigler and Natan from the IDF's elite Talpiot program to develop a more powerful specialized processor for sequence similarity searches; and the company's first product, dubbed the "Bioccelerator", had speeds up to one thousand times faster than other platforms being used at the time.

In 1997, the company followed this success by introducing LEADS, an EST clustering and assembly platform. By around 2001, Compugen had effected a shift in its business model from a company whose almost exclusive focus was marketing computer programs and applications to one whose operations extended into the diagnostics and therapeutics fields. In 2010, under Anat Cohen-Dayag's new leadership, the company shifted its business model to become a fully integrated biopharma company using its developed computational biology discovery technology to identify novel targets and develop its own pipeline of immuno-oncology drugs.

Compugen began trading on the Nasdaq in 2000 and on the Tel Aviv Stock Exchange in 2002. Also in 2002, Compugen spun off its subsidiary Evogene, established as an agriscience division in 1999.

=== Pipeline ===
==== COM701 / PVRIG ====
PVRIG is a novel B7/CD28-like immune checkpoint target candidate. In June 2016, Compugen announced the selection of COM701 as the lead therapeutic candidate for PVRIG. COM701 is currently being evaluated in a Phase 1 study in patients with advanced solid tumors. The study is designed to evaluate the safety and tolerability of COM701 as monotherapy and in combination with a PD-1 inhibitor. Additional endpoints include evaluation of PK/PD and preliminary clinical activity in certain tumor types such as NSCLC, breast, ovarian endometrial cancer. Preclinical data demonstrate that these tumor types express a high level of the biomarkers PVRIG and PVRL2. The Phase 1 study is currently enrolling at various sites in the United States.

==== BAY 1905254 / ILDR2 ====
ILDR2 (internal designation CGEN-15001T) is a novel B7/CD28-like immune checkpoint target candidate discovered by Compugen. This program is partnered to Bayer AG. BAY 1905254, an antibody targeting ILDR2 was co-developed by Compugen and Bayer. After completing preclinical development, the program was transferred to Bayer for further development. Under the terms of their license and collaboration agreement, Bayer is responsible for all the clinical development of BAY 1905254 and its future commercialization worldwide, if the therapy is approved. In September 2018, Bayer initiated patient dosing in a Phase 1 trial assessing the safety and tolerability of BAY 1905254. The study is currently recruiting in patients in the United States. The trial will include 196 patients.

==== COM902 / TIGIT ====
TIGIT is an immune checkpoint in the B7/CD28 family. In March 2017, COM902 was selected as the lead therapeutic candidate for CGEN-15137/TIGIT. Compugen is planning to file an IND with the FDA and initiate a Phase 1 study for COM902 in 2019.

COM503 / IL18BP

Antibody that inhibit IL18-binding protein (IL18BP) to release IL18 in the tumor and activate the immune system. Compugen licensed the asset to Gilead in 2023.

==== CGEN-15001/ILDR2 Fc Fusion ====
CGEN-15001/ILDR2-Fc is the company's lead program for autoimmune diseases.

== Partnerships/collaborations ==
=== Bristol-Myers Squibb ===
In October 2018, Compugen announced a clinical collaboration and equity investment agreement with Bristol-Myers Squibb. Under the terms of the agreement, Bristol Bristol-Myers Squibb will supply Opdivo®, its PD-1 inhibitor, for the combination arm of Compugen's Phase 1 study designed to evaluate the safety and tolerability of COM701 and Opdivo in four tumor types, including non-small cell lung, ovarian, breast, and endometrial cancer. In addition, Bristol-Myers may initiate and fund clinical trials that assess combinations of multiple checkpoint inhibitors, including PVRIG (the target of COM701), and TIGIT. In conjunction with the collaboration agreement, Bristo-Mayers Squibb made a $12 million equity investment in Compugen, holding approximately 4% of the company.

=== Bayer Healthcare ===
In August 2013, Compugen entered into a collaboration and license agreement with Bayer AG to develop antibody drugs for cancer immunotherapy against two Compugen-discovered immune checkpoint regulators CGEN-15001T and CGEN-15022. The companies agreed to collaborate on preclinical programs, with Bayer retaining full control over clinical development and commercialization after preclinical work was completed. Under the terms of the agreement, Compugen received $10 million up front payment and was set to receive $30 million, plus up to $500 million in milestone payments on both programs and was eligible for mid to high single-digit royalties on product sales. In 2017, after joint assessment of the CGEN-15022 program, the investment in the program was halted and the Bayer collaboration shifted solely CGEN-15001T. To date, Compugen received approximately $25 million in up front and preclinical milestone payments and is eligible to up to $250 million in milestone payments and mid to high single-digit royalties on product sales. In April 2018, Bayer disclosed the target of this program as ILDR2 and announced its intention to advance the program to the clinic.

=== Medimmune (subsidiary of AstraZeneca) ===
In March 2018, Compugen entered into an exclusive license agreement with MedImmune, the global biologics research arm of AstraZeneca to develop bi-specific and multi-specific immuno-oncology antibody products derived from one of Compugen's pipeline products. MedImmune has the right to develop multiple product under this license and is solely responsible for R&D and commercial expenses. Under the terms of the agreement, Compugen will receive a $10 million upfront payment and up to $200 million in development, regulatory and commercial milestones for the first product as well as tiered royalties on future product sales. If any other products are developed, Compugen is eligible for additional milestone payments and royalties.

=== Johns Hopkins University School of Medicine ===
In December 2014, Compugen announced the initiation of a multi-year research collaboration with Johns Hopkins University School of Medicine, (JHU) on immune checkpoint candidates for the potential treatment of cancer. This collaborative research expanded Compugen's ongoing assessment of the biology and mechanism of action of its novel B7/CD8-like immune checkpoint proteins, and provided access to the world-class I-O research tools and expertise at JHU. The project is overseen by Prof. Drew Pardoll and Dr. Charles Drake, members of Compugen's scientific advisory board and well-known pioneers in the field of immuno-oncology. In October 2017, the collaboration was expanded to include new additional targets discovered by Compugen which have the potential to serve as a basis for the development of cancer immunotherapy treatments.

=== Mount Sinai Hospital ===
In November 2017, Compugen announced a multi-year research collaboration with Mount Sinai Hospital, under the direction of Dr. Miriam Merad. The collaboration focuses on the research and target validation of selected myeloid candidates discovered by Compugen for their potential to serve as a basis for cancer immunotherapy treatments, including the validation of their role in innate immunity and involvement in tumor biology.

== Management ==
Mor Amitai, who joined Compugen in 1994, was the company's CEO and president from 1998 to 2005. He was replaced by Alex Kotzer, who was CEO and president through 2008. In 2009 Anat Cohen-Dayag became co-CEO of Compugen, serving alongside Martin Gerstel. In 2010 she became the company's exclusive CEO, until replaced by Eran Ophir in September 2025.

== See also ==
- Human Genome Project
- In silico
- Transcriptome
- Genesis Partners
- List of Israeli companies quoted on the Nasdaq
