= Tsvi Misinai =

Israeli researcher and writer

- צבי מסיני
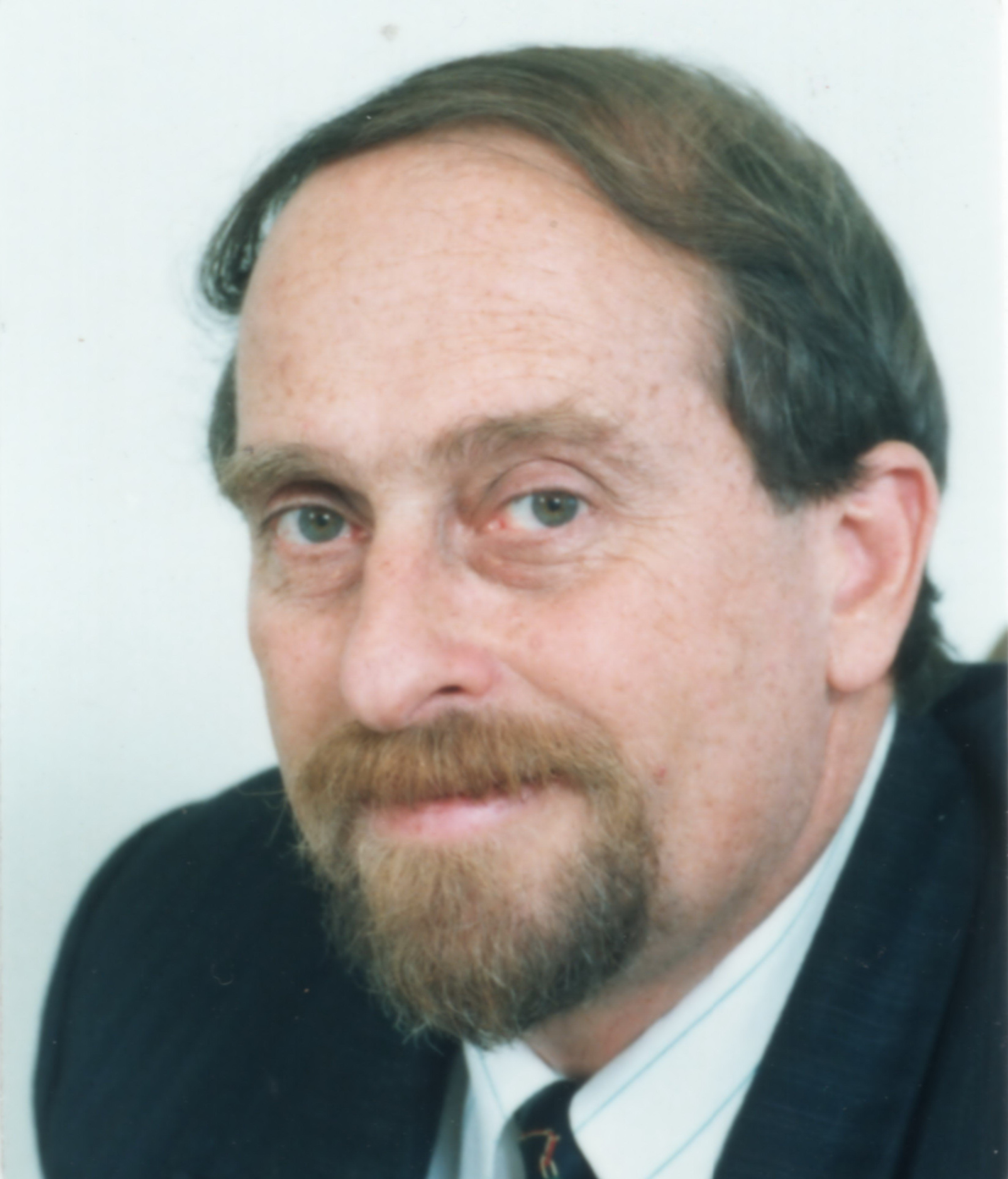
- Born: Tsvi Jekhorin Misinai; 15 April 1946 (age 80); Jerusalem, British Mandate of Palestine
- Occupations: Computer scientist, writer, historian
- Writing career
- Genres: History, postcolonialism
- Subjects: Israel, Palestine, Arab–Israeli conflict, Hebrew origins of Palestinians
- Website: the-engagement.org

Tsvi Jekhorin Misinai (Hebrew: צבי מסיני; born 15 April 1946) is an Israeli researcher, writer, historian, computer scientist and entrepreneur. A pioneer of the Israeli software industry, he now spends most of his time researching and documenting the common Hebrew roots he believes shared by world Jewry and the Palestinians (including Arab citizens of Israel).

== Biography ==
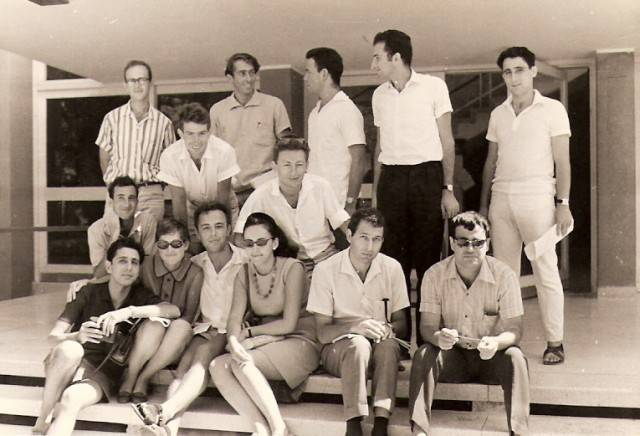
Misinai (second left from the top row) with friends, during his last year as a B.Sc student at the Haifa Technion in 1968

Tsvi Misinai was born in 1946 in Jerusalem, Mandatory Palestine to Ashkenazi Jewish parents who immigrated from Ternopil in Poland Galicia (now Ukraine) in 1939. He graduated in Physics from the Haifa Technion in 1968. He was the first Israeli to receive the Rothschild Award for industrial development in the field of software in 1992.

Misinai is the founder of Sapiens International Corporation and served as its president until 1994. He embedded the principle of Positive Thinking in computers and invented the Rule Based Object Oriented technology for developing data processing applications, the development of which he started in the Weizmann Institute of Science in 1972.

Misinai self-identifies as a secular Jew and currently resides in Rehovot.

Misinai first heard about the "Hebrew origins of Palestinians" theory from his father, Kha'yim Avraham, who served in the Royal Artillery in the Second World War. His interest was rekindled after the 1991 Gulf War, when there was talk about a new order in the Middle East. After the failure of the Oslo Accords that led to the commencement of the Al-Aqsa Intifada in 2000, he abandoned his career as a computer scientist and devoted his entire life to investigating the Jewish roots of Palestinians. He now spends his entire time tracking down Palestinians who acknowledge their Jewish heritage, and lobbying ministers, ambassadors, religious leaders and activists in both communities. Misinai, and his team of Arabs and Jews, have embarked on a mission of trying to bring peace to Israel through a unique and controversial project called "The Engagement".

== Project on Palestinians ==
=== Hebrew origin ===
==== Background ====
Tsvi Misinai claims that the majority of the Palestinian people—including those with Israeli citizenship or residency, known variously as Arab citizens of Israel, Arab Israelis, Israeli Arabs, including the Bedouin Arabs of Israel—are descendants of the ancient Hebrews, as most of the world's Jewish ethnic divisions are. Furthermore, he claims that at least half of them are quietly aware of this fact.

According to Misinai, unlike the ancestors of the modern day Jews who were city dwellers to a large extent, the Hebrew ancestors of the Palestinians were rural dwellers, and were allowed to remain in the land of Israel to work the land and supply Rome with grain and olive oil.

Misinai states the topic of Hebrew origin was spoken of openly by Palestinians until relatively recent history, much like the Egyptians or Lebanese are aware of their origins in the ancient Egyptians and Phoenicians respectively, even if these ancestral origin topics arouse the passions in those countries among those wishing to either stress or de-emphasise them.

As with other "Arabs" whose local indigenous non-Arab origins became relegated issues over time, the Hebrew origin of Palestinians also became a relegated issue over time. For the Palestinians, however, the additional emergence of Zionism in the early 19th century introduced a quandary complicating an unbiased assessment to either acknowledge or deny the local indigenous non-Arab ancestry of a culturally and linguistically Arabized people. In the context of the Palestinians, this quandary was a competing national interest in the land they inhabited. Arab nationalism for Palestinians would thus serve as a counter-force vis-à-vis Zionism. The topic of the Palestinians’ ancestral Hebrew origin thus became admonished. Then, the establishment of modern Israel by world Jewry, having transpired to the detriment of the Palestinians, transformed the topic of the Palestinians’ Hebrew origin into a liability in the historical narrative for either side to admit, ultimately becoming the object of outright hostility.

==== Conversions and Arabization ====
As a result of remaining in the Land of Israel, the ancestors of the Palestinians partially converted to Christianity during the Byzantine era. Later, with the coming of Islam, they were Islamized through a combination of mainly forced conversions, but also nominal conversions (that is, conversions for form's sake to derive benefits as Muslims, and avoid tributes owed by non-Muslims in Muslim-ruled lands) and others yet out of genuine theological conviction.

Conversion to Islam occurred progressively throughout the successive periods of foreign elite minority rule over Palestine, both on an individual basis and en masse, starting with the conversions during the various dynasties of Arabian Muslim rulers from the initial Muslim conquest of Palestine. Following these came rule by Muslim non-Arab dynasties such as the Ayyubids (Kurdish Muslim), Mamluks (Turkic Muslim) and finally the Ottomans (Turkish Muslim). This continuous phase of elite minority foreign Islamic rule over a local indigenous (now largely Muslim) mass was only briefly interrupted by the elite minority foreign Christian rule by the European Crusaders, which lasted from 1099 until their expulsion by the Mameluks in 1291.

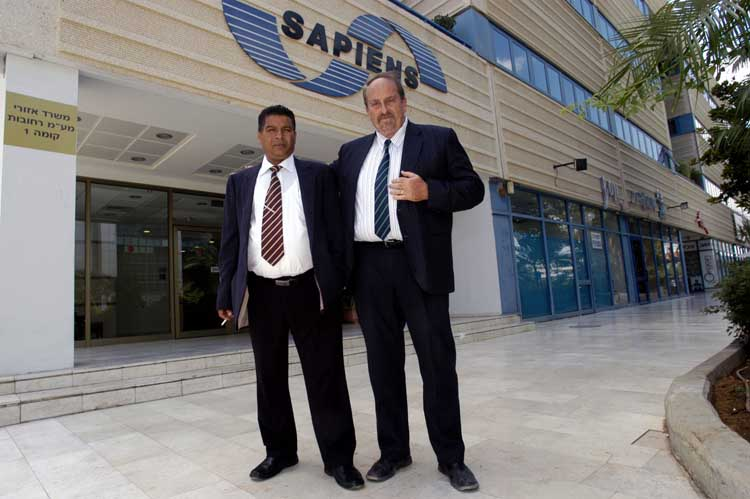
Standing before the Sapiens building in Rehovot, Misinai and Ovadia Yerushalmi, a Bedouin Jew and key Engagement Movement activist from the Banu Sawarka tribe

Misinai states that of this gradual process of conversions (often accompanied by Arabization), the majority were forcibly converted during the Fatimid era under the reign of Caliph al-Hakim who was crowned at the age of 11, and reigned from the years 996 to 1021. Due to his young age, in practice, it was his ministers who wielded the actual power behind the throne for some time. They gave the young Caliph power to influence religious matters only, and appointed him as Imam. In 1009, the extremists among his ministers gained the upper hand and brought upon a series of decrees against Christians and Jews.

In 1012, the al-Hakem Edict was issued, under which all Jews and Christians in Palestine were ordered to either convert to Islam or leave. Misinai claims that this led to the majority of non-Hebrew origin Christians (i.e., foreign Christians) to leave Palestine, and over 90 per cent of Jews, Samaritans (also of Hebrew origin) and Hebrew-origin Christians to convert and become Muslims. They would also become Musta'arabim (Arabized), acculturated into Arab language, custom and culture.

Later, when the edict was finally repealed in 1044 during the reign of Caliph Al-Mustansir of Cairo, only 27 per cent of the Jewish converts to Islam returned to Judaism openly, although they too would remain Musta’arabi (culturally and linguistically Arab). The remainder continued to live as Muslim crypto-Jews in order to continue enjoying the economic advantages of Muslims, such as exemption from paying jizya and kharaj, the ability to sell their agricultural products to the foreign authorities, or gain employment in the government machinery. Many younger persons of Hebrew-origin (Jewish, Christian or Samaritan) saw it simultaneously possible to lead dual lives, incorporating their prior faith while being outwardly Muslim, and accruing material benefits. Later, with the advent of Mamluk rule, Judaism had reached a breaking point in Palestine.

==== Backing ====
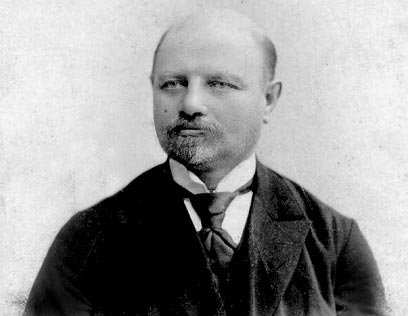
In his 1928 anthropological work, Arabs in Eretz Israel, Israel Belkind, a pioneer of the First Aliyah, advanced the claim that the Palestinian Arabs were descended from the ancient Hebrews.

Tsvi Misinai validates his theory of the Hebrew origin of Palestinians on the basis of various findings in terms of historic-demographic, historic-geographic, national-territorial, genetic, behavioural-religious, nomenclature and linguistics, and Palestinian cultural and oral traditions. In his book Brother shall not lift sword against brother, he details numerous testimonies of their Jewish ancestry by Palestinians and Bedouins, and cites the anthropological studies conducted by Israel Belkind, one of the organizers of the Bilu movement, David Ben-Gurion and Yitzhak Ben-Zvi (both the first Prime Minister and the second President of Israel, respectively).

Misinai also cites the following three genetic studies as lending credence to his theory. Among the genetic studies referred to by him include recent genetic studies conducted by Professor Ariella Oppenheim of the Hebrew University in Jerusalem on the male Y chromosome which revealed that the present day Jews and Palestinians represent modern descendants of a core population that lived in the area now constituting the state of Israel and the Palestinian territories, since prehistoric times. In 2001, the Human Immunology magazine published a genetic study conducted by Prof. Antonio Arnez-Vilna, a Spanish researcher from the Complutense University of Madrid, who discovered that the immune systems of the Jews and the Palestinians are extremely close to one another in a way that almost absolutely demonstrates a similar genetic identity. Furthermore, a 2002 test by Tel Aviv University researchers, determined that only two groups in the world—Ashkenazi Jews and Palestinians—were genetically susceptible to an inherited deafness syndrome.

=== Classification of the Palestinians ===
Tsvi Misinai separates the Palestinian people into three main groups; the "Descendants of Israel", "Brethren of Israel" and "Palestinians of miscellaneous origins". He states that until recently, there had been very few inter-marriages between these groups, as Palestinians usually tended to marry within their own clans or related clans.

==== Descendants of Israel ====
The "Descendants of Israel", he claims, comprise descendants of the ancient biblical Hebrews which are native to the land west of the Jordan River (the West Bank, Gaza Strip and Israel proper). They are more specifically descended from the inhabitants of the Kingdom of Judah, as opposed to the Samaritans who are mainly descended from the inhabitants of the Kingdom of Israel.

Misinai claims that the Descendants of Israel had ceased to call themselves Musta’arbim, when the Brethren of Israel returned to their homeland during the 18th and 19th centuries. Despite this, stories about the Jewish origins of the family were passed on among the Descendants of Israel, and a few Jewish customs were preserved. Both groups began seeing themselves as one people, although endogamous marriages with their own clans ensured the purity of their blood lines until very recently.

===== Samaritans =====
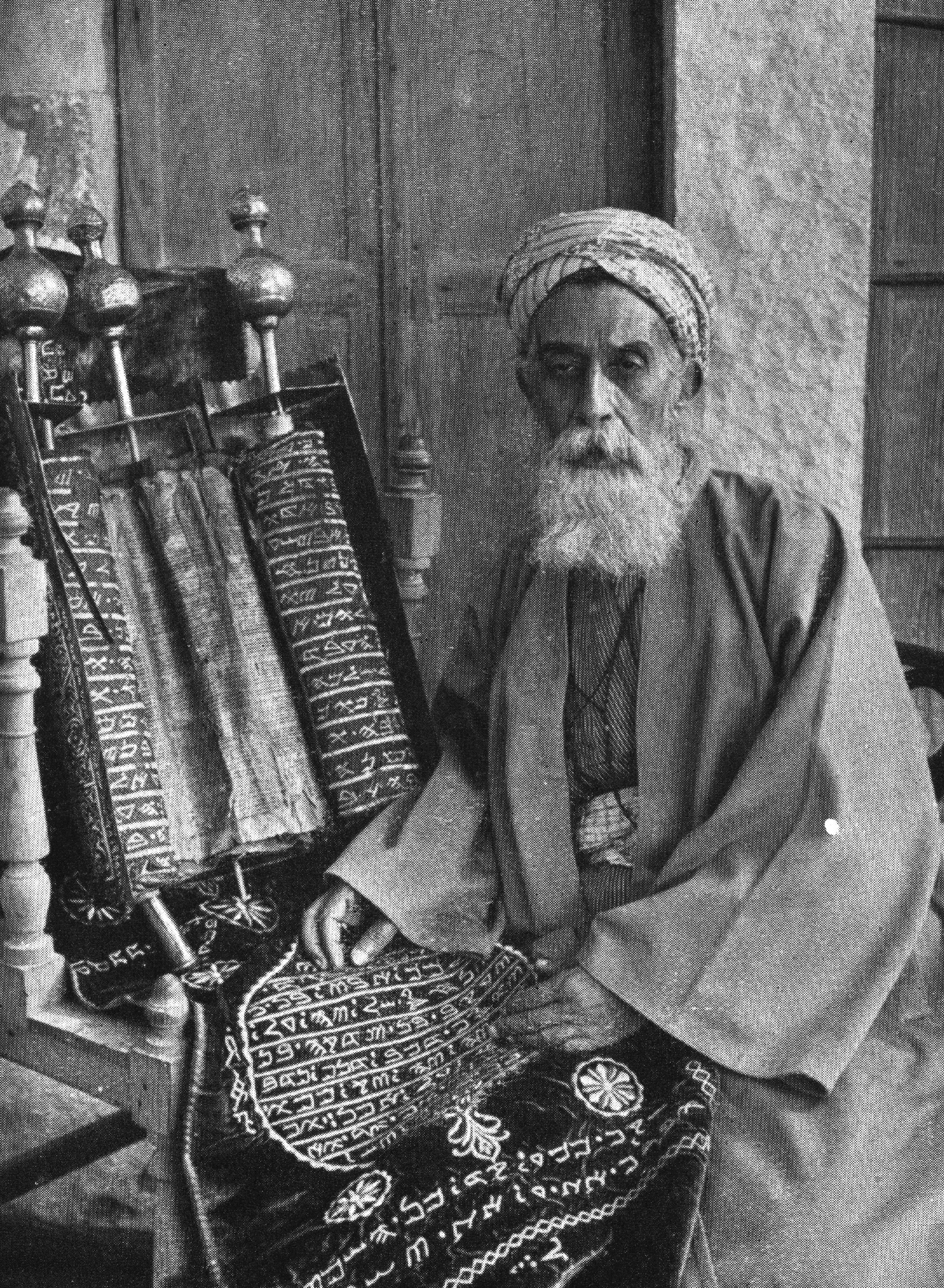
Samaritan High Priest with the Paleo-Hebrew alphabet Samaritan Torah, Nablus, c. 1920.

The Samaritans are distinguished among Descendants of Israel, given that their ancient history serves as an analogous precursor to the present situation that Tsvi Misinai argues exists between world Jewry and the Palestinians—that upon their returns from exile and re-establishments of Israel, world Jewry misidentified as foreigners the descendants of those Israelites who had stayed behind, first in antiquity misidentifying the Samaritans as foreigners, and today in modern times misidentifying the Palestinians (Arabized Hebrews of the Muslim and Christian faiths) as foreigners.

The Samaritans are Descendants of Israel, being descended from farmers among the Israelite Tribes, part of whom were never exiled by the Assyrians or the Babylonians during the period of the destruction of the First Jewish Commonwealth. Their maternal lineages, however, derive from the Small Nations (those who came from Cuthah and others) who were exiled to Samaria by the Assyrians and intermixed with their paternal Israelite ancestors. The alien minority who remained in the land, adopted the Israelite religion (Samaritanism, the sister Israelite religion to Judaism) in the course of time, after the destruction of the First Temple. A portion of the Samaritans exiled by the Assyrians, were later repatriated by the prophet Jeremiah in the days of the Judean king Josiah.

The Babylonians, who followed the Assyrians as the dominant entity in the Fertile Crescent, exiled many Samaritans but skipped over a significant part of the Samaritan population. By the time they arrived in Samaria, the Babylonians found many alien elements in the land of Israel. Consequently, they did not undertake a thorough ethnic cleansing expulsion from Samaria, since the Assyrians had led many areas to be viewed as places whose indigenous population had already been replaced by aliens and needed no further expulsion.

Later, when the exiled Israelites (now known as Jews) returned from the Babylonian exile under prophets Ezra and Nehemiah, they misidentified the Israelites who had stayed behind (now known as Samaritans) as foreigners. The reason for the misidentification was because the deportations had led the exiled Israelites and the Israelites who remained behind to develop in different ways. The Babylonian captivity had a number of serious effects on the exiled Israelites (Jews), their religion (Judaism) and their culture. Included among the most obvious of these changes was replacing the original Paleo-Hebrew alphabet (see also Samaritan script) with what is in fact a stylised form of the Aramaic alphabet (now commonly called the "Hebrew alphabet" because it is the normative form in which Hebrew is written due to Jewish numeric superiority), changes in the fundamental practices and customs of the Jewish religion, the culmination of Biblical prophecy (in the Jewish prophet Ezekiel), the compilation of not only of the Talmud and Halakha (Jewish religious law, absent in Samaritanism) but also the incorporation of Nevi'im (Prophets) and Ketuvim (Writings) as a part of the cannon together with the Torah (in Samaritanism, only the Torah is canonical, see Samaritan Torah), and the emergence of scribes and sages as Jewish leaders (see Ezra and the Pharisees). These resulting differences in religious practices between returnees and those who remained in Israel led to a schism in the Israelites, and whenceforth the creation of separate Samaritan and Jewish entities. Over the centuries, Judaism and world Jewry have come to the acceptance that the Samaritans are indeed descendants of Israelites.

The Islamic conquest of Palestine in the first half of the 7th century, and the subsequent Arab rule, marked the beginning of the phase of decline and erosion of Samaritan identity, even more detrimentally than the extreme toll on Jewish identity. The passing of the aforementioned al-Hakem Edict in 1021, along with another notable forced conversion to Islam imposed at the hands of the rebel Ibn Firasa, decreased their numbers significantly, such that they decreased from more than a million in Roman times to just 712 people today.

For those who maintained a Samaritan identity and religious association into modern times, they too, like their Palestinian counterparts who had additionally adopted Christianity and later Islam, were nevertheless thoroughly Arabized in language and culture. After the establishment of modern Israel, Samaritans living in what became the State of Israel replaced Palestinian Arabic with modern Hebrew as their day to day language (although Samaritan Hebrew had always been maintained as the liturgical language, along with liturgical Samaritan Aramaic and liturgical Samaritan Arabic).

==== Brethren of Israel ====
The "Brethren of Israel", which are originally native to the land east of the Jordan River (the East Bank, that is, modern-day Jordan) comprise the descendants of the brother nations of the Hebrews, i.e., the ancient Edomites, Ammonites and Moabites who variously converted to Judaism and moved to Israel before the Roman invasion, and were later forcibly converted together with the "Descendants of Israel" first to Christianity and then Islam.

Misinai states that the history of the Brethren of Israel is mostly intertwined with those of the Descendants of Israel. The Moabites, the Ammonites and the Edomites were forcibly converted to Judaism and made an extension of the Israelite nation during the course of King David’s conquests. Despite this, their kings were allowed to continue to directly hold the reins of power, and they were not incorporated into any of the Israelite tribes. In the case of the Edomites, their fierce opposition to Israelite occupation led King David to order the killing of all male Edomites. Thus, the women in Edom had no alternative but to marry members of the Israelite garrison and other Israelites. As a result, the bloodlines of Edomites from that point onwards were partially Hebrew.

After the destruction of the First Jewish Commonwealth by the Babylonian King Nebuchadnezzar, a considerable part of the Edomites and Moabites were exiled together with the Israelites. The majority of the Ammonites were exiled and those who remained were assimilated into the Moabite communities. The kinship between the Brethren of Israel, and the Israelites continued throughout the period of the Second Commonwealth and henceforth.

However, after the destruction of the First Commonwealth and the absence of the hegemony of an Israelite regime, the Moabites and Edomites discarded their affiliation to the people of Israel and left Judaism en masse. To bring them back into the fold, the Hasmonean leaders decided to re-convert them a second time. The mass Judaization campaign was started by John Hyrcanus with the conversion of the Moabites and was ended by Alexander Jannaeus who completed the conversion of the Moabites and also the Edomites after he added their territory to his Kingdom. For the next 1,600 years, these Brethren of Israel continued to be an inseparable part of the People of Israel. The Edomites and Moabites (along with the Samaritans) participated in the First Jewish–Roman War and inflicted more damage on their enemies, relative to their small numbers, than the Jews.

Since the Edomites and Moabites ancestral lands were located east of the Jordan River, this made them more close to Arabia and more removed from the Jewish people. As a result, they were more susceptible to conversions to Islam, and hence, subsequently became Musta’arbim. When devastating famines broke out at the beginning of the 16th century, many among these Brethren of Israel emigrated to Persia. As a result of juggling different religious identities to avoid persecution, they eventually forgot their Jewish and Musta’arbi origins and became radicalised, and started considering themselves to be Arabs.

Later, as things improved in the 18th and 19th century, many of those who left returned from Persia, Yemen and Sudan, shifting residences between present day Jordan and Israel, with the former mountain dwellers returning to their ancient homes, and the Edomites, Moabites, etc., settling in the plains. It is these "Brethren of Israel", Misinai contends, who constitute most of the Palestinian population east of the Jordan river and the Palestinian refugees (both within the Palestinian territories and outside), while the majority of Palestinians who did not flee and remain in Israel proper, West Bank and Gaza area, are "Descendants of Israel".

Misinai traces the beginning of the Arab–Israeli conflict and a Palestinian "Arab" identity to the simultaneous immigration of the Jews from various places and Brethren of Israel (from the east), to the land west of the Jordan river from 1840 to 1947. He states that by 1914 the Brethren of Israel became a very large group among Palestinians there and would remain so, until they were mostly expelled during the Palestinian exodus in 1948. He argues that these people have now returned to their ancestral homeland east of the Jordan river, and possess no right to the land of Israel.

Misinai states it is this group that are the most anti-semitic and most active in terrorist activities in the intifada, with their objectives being to return to the lands they abandoned in 1948. He claims that the leadership of the Palestinian militant organisations such as Palestinian Islamic Jihad, Al-Aqsa Martyrs' Brigades, Fatah al-Islam, Izz ad-Din al-Qassam Brigades, etc., are primarily internally supported by over 1,300,000 Brethren of Israel, who all reside west of the Jordan river. The victims of such terrorist acts tend to be the People of Israel, the Descendants of Israel and a small number of others.

According to Misinai, the Brethren of Israel are the smartest group among the Palestinian people and make up the majority of the Palestinian leadership. He states that the early leadership of the various Palestinian nationalist organisations such as Fatah, PLO, PFLP, etc., came primarily from among the Brethren of Israel refugees in the 1948 exodus. While he acknowledges that the Brethren of Israel have suffered more than any other Palestinians, he blames the Brethren of Israel leadership of perpetuating the problem for more than 50 years in order to gain camp followers both among those of their brethren who continue to suffer and among the Arabs and others who feel sorry for them.

==== Others ====
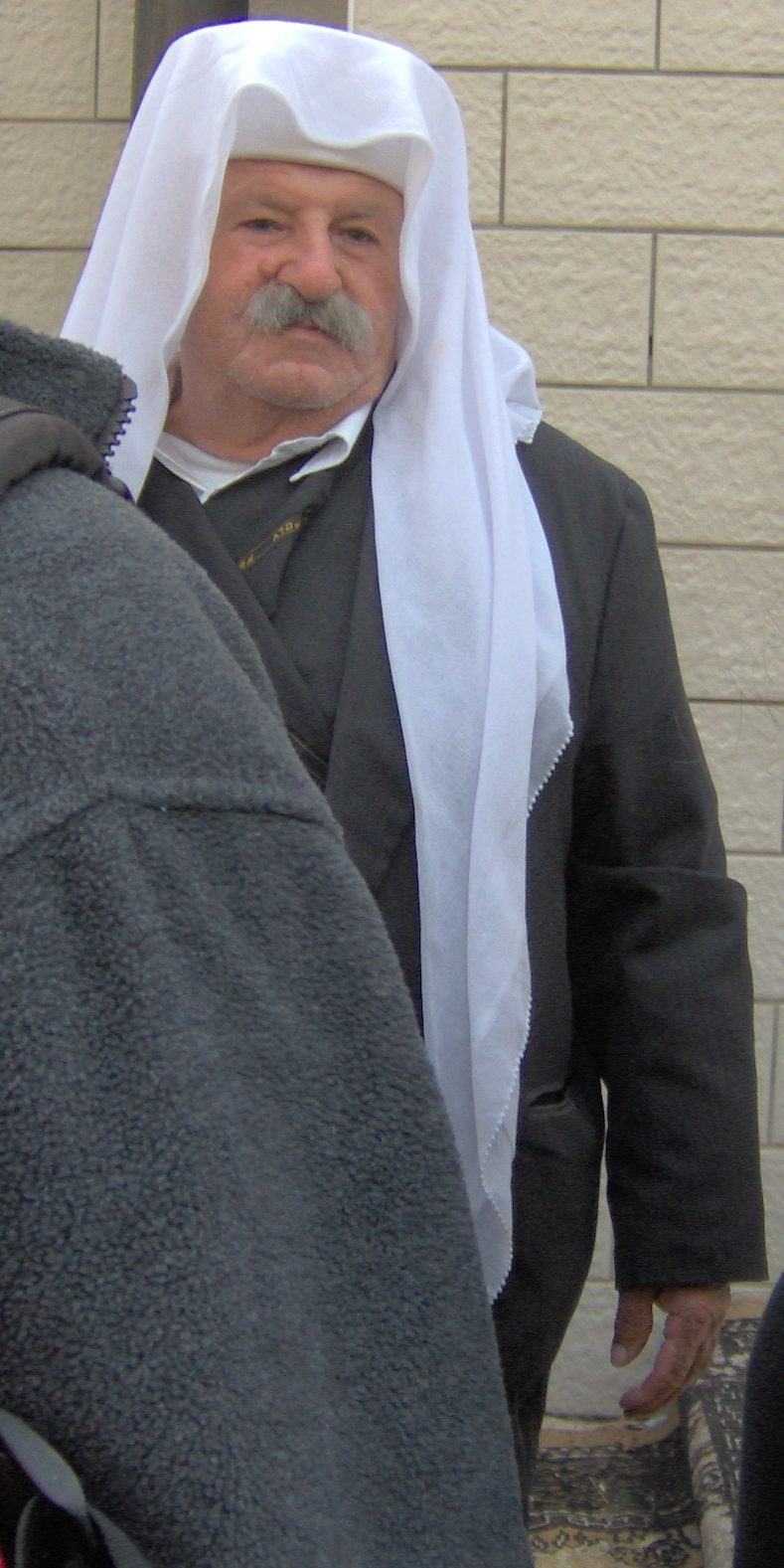
A Druze man in Peki'in, Israel. Misinai claims that the Druze are partially of Jewish descent.

In addition to these two main components, there also include a significantly small percentage of Arabs, descendants of the soldiers who served in the occupying Roman army after the destruction of the Second Temple and even some survivors of the ancient Canaanite and Philistine who are idol worshipers that live in Gaza and in the village of Jisr az-Zarka, near Haifa. A minuscule percentage of Palestinians are also descendants of 500 European Crusaders who stayed behind in Palestine and converted to Islam. These Crusaders, he indicates, are the source of the smatterings of blond haired and blue-eyed Palestinians one witnesses today.

The various entities among the neighbouring small nations of gentiles, such as the Philistines, Canaanites, Jebusites, Amorites, Hivites and Perizzites inhabited the remainder of the historical region of Canaan, from which the Hebrews under Joshua had driven them off and carved out a nation for themselves called Israel. These nations were all eventually vanquished by King David and made a part of the Kingdom of Israel. A large number were later exiled by King Nebuchadnezzar in the course of the destruction of the Kingdom of Judah and the Babylonian exile. A mass Judaization process in Israel in the course of the Hasmonean Period left only a handful of Philistines, Canaanites and other members of the Small Nations. Since conversion was not imposed on remnants of these Small Nations who had been Hellenized, they continued to worship Greek deities. They were forced to nominally accept Christianity during the Byzantine period, and later finally expelled by Caliph Al-Hakim during the Fatimid rule, together with the majority of the Christian descendants of the Roman Army and almost all the Christian Arabs.

A few hundred, however, remained and their descendants constitute the small numbers of idol worshippers who live in Israel in modern times. These include a few Canaanites that reside in the village of Jisr az-Zarqa near Caesarea, a few thousand Philistines and Canaanites in Gaza, and descendants of the Phoenicians in the form of Maronite Catholics (primarily the refugees from Ikrit and Kafr Bir'im).

Misinai also claims that the Druze of Israel, Syria and Lebanon are partially of Jewish descent, along with Arab, Midianite, Assyrian and Egyptian origins. He further states that there were Jewish villages that became part of the Druze community, mostly to avoid being forcibly converted to Islam, such as the residents of the Western Galilee villages of Abu Snein and Yarka.

=== Proportion of Hebrew-descended Palestinians ===
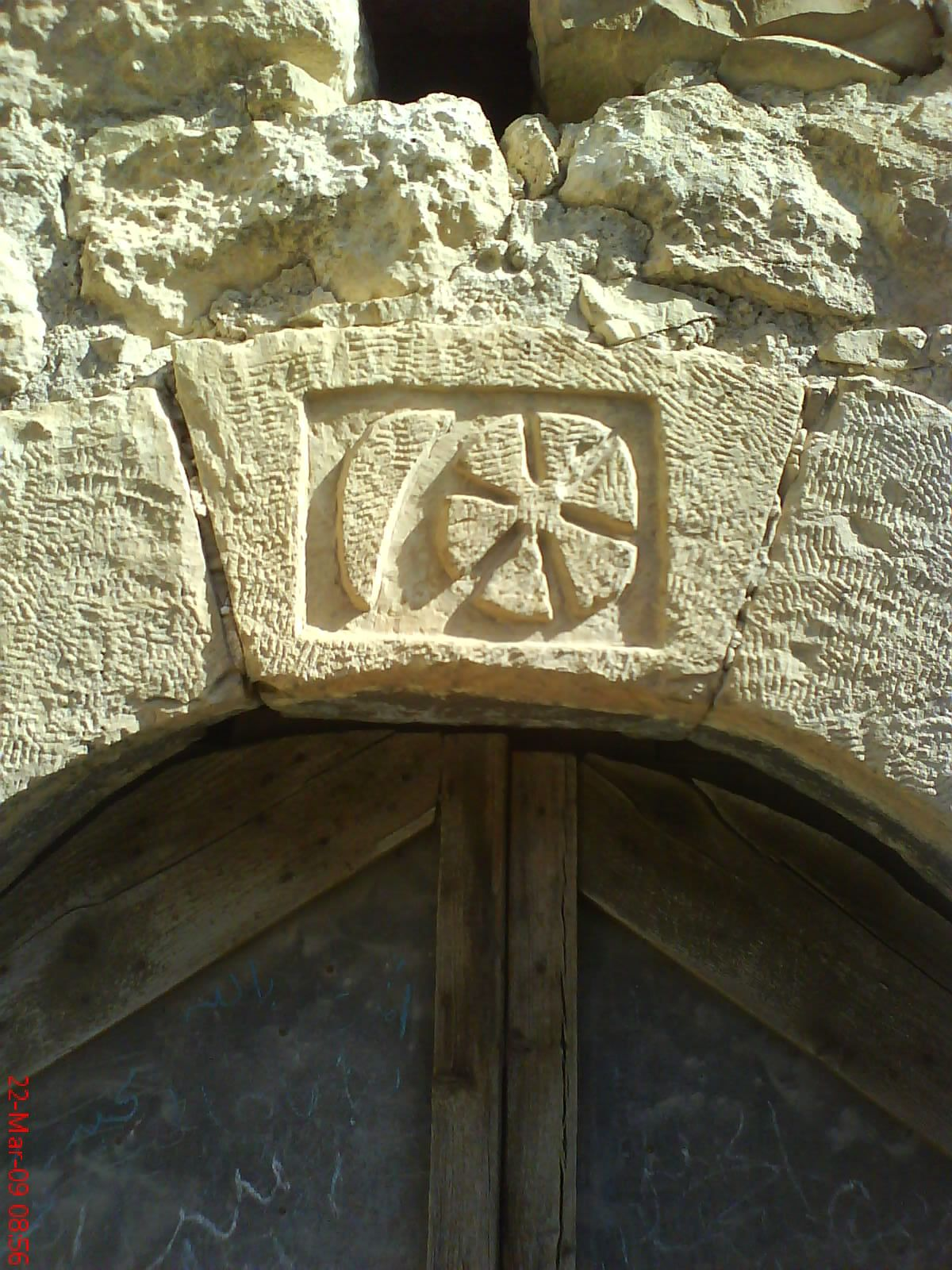
A thinly disguised star of David on a doortop in Yatta, southern Mount Hebron

Tsvi Misinai claims that nearly 90 per cent of the Palestinian people living in Israel proper and the occupied territories are of Hebrew descent (with the percentage among the population of the Gaza Strip being higher than 90 per cent), but a greatly reduced percentage among Palestinian refugees living outside those areas.

In his book Brother shall not lift his sword against Brother, Misinai puts forward the following statistics pertaining to the proportion of the "Descendants of Israel" and the "Brethren of Israel" populations among the Palestinians and Arab Israelis, as of December 2007. It is detailed as four main areas (the West Bank excluding East Jerusalem, Gaza strip, East Jerusalem and Israel proper) and are as follows:

- In the Israeli-occupied West Bank—not counting East Jerusalem, the number of permanent residents was 956,000, of which over 580,000 (61 per cent) were Descendants of Israel. Another 27 per cent were 259,000 Brethren of Israel (of whom were 158,000 descendants of the Edomites and 101,000 descendants of the Moabites). The remainder included 43,000 Arabs (4.5 per cent), 44,000 descendants of the Roman Army, 24,000 Christians from Distant Places and 6,000 Kurds.
- In the Gaza Strip, there were 891,000 permanent residents, including Bedouin. Out of the non-Bedouin, 275,000 were Descendants of Israel, 520,000 were Brethren of Israel (approximately 270,000 descendants of the Moabites and approximately 250,000 descendants of the Edomites), 43,000 descendants of the Roman Army, 4,000 Arabs who live in the Jabali’ya refugee camp; 3,400 Canaanites and 2,700 Philistines all living in Gaza city, and 3,000 Druze that live in the Dir al-Balakh refugee camp. Among the Descendants of Israel in the Gaza Strip, 30,000 are descendants of the Samaritans and 245,000 (27.5 per cent) are descendants of authentic Jews. The population of the Gaza Strip also includes 40,000 Bedouin. The internal distribution of the Gaza Bedouin is 18,000 descendants of Moabites, 14,000 descendants of Edomites and 8,000 Descendants of Israel. In addition to the Bedouin, the total number of the Descendants of Israel is 283,000 (32 per cent), of the Brethren of Israel is 552,000 (62 per cent, 288,000 or 32 per cent descendants of Moabites and 264,000 or 30 per cent descendants of Edomites).
- Of the 200,000 non-Jewish residents of East Jerusalem, 82,000 are Descendants of the People of Israel, out of which 2,000 are descendants of Samaritans living in the Samaritan neighbourhood, A-Sumera or Al-Abid. Out of this group, 7,000 are Christians. Some 48,000 are descendants of Kurds who came during the reign of Saladin. Over 32,000 are Brethren of Israel (24,000 descendants of the Moabites and 8,000 descendants of the Edomites). Some 27,000 are of Arab origin, and constitute the main concentration of population of Arab origin among Israeli citizens today. This includes 9,000 members of the veteran Arab settlers, and 14,000 descendants of the Arab Army living in the Mount of Olives neighbourhood. There are also another 11,000 inhabitants who are recognised as non-Arab citizens: 5,000 Armenians and 6,000 non-Arab Christians from various distant locations.
- Within Israel proper, 642,000 (45.5 per cent) out of 1,413,000 non-Jewish residents within the Green Line (not counting East Jerusalem) are Descendants of the People of Israel. Some 457,000 are Brethren of Israel in the State of Israel (and another 32,000 in Jerusalem), or 36 per cent of all the Palestinians there (489,000 or 34.5 per cent, including Jerusalem). A further breakdown of this figure shows that the descendants of the Edomites number 166,000, and constitute 13 per cent (of the Palestinians in the State of Israel, or 174,000 or 12.5 per cent, with Jerusalem). The descendants of the Moabites number 291,000, and constitute 23 per cent (315,000 or 22 per cent with Jerusalem). The sum total of veteran inhabitants who are neither Palestinian nor Jewish is 140,000 and includes 121,000 Druze and 19,000 foreigners from Distant Places. The descendants of the Roman Army number 150,000, or 12 per cent (10.5 per cent with Jerusalem). The rest, some 16,000, or 1.25 per cent, are Arabs, (43,000 or 3 per cent with Jerusalem). The number of Palestinians within the Green Line is 1,273,000. Among the Palestinians (i.e., those without Israeli citizenship) within the Green Line (not including East Jerusalem) the percentage who are Descendants of the People of Israel is close to 50.5 per cent.

=== Views on Palestinian identity and the Arab–Israeli conflict ===
Tsvi Misinai denies the existence of a separate Palestinian people as a historical identity and dismisses it as an utter fabrication. He views the Palestinian nationality as a modern socio-political construct propped up by imperialist Arab Baathist regimes, as a means of claiming rights to the land of Israel and fight the Jews. He also blames them for accentuating hostilities between the Jews and Palestinians. In his book, Misinai asserts that the Palestinian people are a part and parcel of the people of Israel, and that no other party, including an Arab one, possesses the right to compete with the rights of the People of Israel over western Eretz Yisrael and their historical kinship with most Palestinians.

Misinai claims that the Palestinian national identity is not developed, for most Palestinians think of it in religious terms, not territorial. He states that their identity today is only Islamic and that there is a need for them to obtain a modern identity, which is Israeli. He asserts that this modern identity can never be Palestinian, as the country never had such an historical identity and as most Palestinians are themselves the progeny of the ancient Hebrews. Misinai labels the name "Palestine" as two huge bluffs, both a semantic bluff of the name Palestine and a genetic bluff as Palestine indicates that the modern day Palestinians are scions of the Philistines.

Misinai puts forward widespread ignorance about the true Jewish identity of the Palestinians or attempts to hide it, coupled with terrorism, as the root causes in escalating the conflict. He asserts that this is what prevents their liberation and preserves their enslavement within an occupation by a false Arab identity.

Misinai claims that even though, many Palestinians are aware of their Jewish origins, they rarely speak about this, and their vast majority does nothing to change their status. Those living under a Palestinian terror regime are deterred from speaking on this subject openly, for fear of being harmed. Many Palestinian parents who aware of their Jewish origins usually don't tell their children. Furthermore, families suspected of Jewish origins are forced to prove their loyalty as Arabs by aiding terrorists and giving their children patriotic names such as Jihad. Such behaviour deters Jews from establishing ties with such families. Even among Israeli Arabs there is a fear of discussion, primarily due to conventions on both sides and particularly the disbelief they would encounter among Jews. They fear that if they try and promote their claim, the Jews will think they are trying to improve their inferior status under false pretenses.

He believes that both his findings and the genetic evidence gathered by Ariella Oppenheim and others render the Israeli–Palestinian conflict redundant, as it proves that the whole of Israel and the occupied territories belong to both the so-called "recognised Jews" and "unrecognised Jews".

Misinai also believes that given the option, most Palestinians would support a one-state solution. He also claims that most Palestinians do not hate Jews and are interested in peace with Israel. He claims that many are opposed to the Jewish presence in the Palestinian territories, because the issue has been hijacked by groups—the leadership of the Arab world, and Palestinians (both the Brethren of Israel and the Descendants of Israel) who have forgotten their Jewish origins.

The primary sin of Zionism, according to Misinai, is the suppression of the historic truth about the Jewish origins of the majority of Palestinians, and ignoring his findings and its ramifications. He asserts that most of the Palestinians who together with the Jews possess historical rights to Israel have become hostages of descendants of foreigners in their own homeland who control their lives, force terrorism upon them and control the cash designated for Palestinians.

Misinai also states that the number of refugees has been deliberately blown out of proportions and that there are far fewer refugees than is widely believed. To this, he attributes the Palestinians' taking advantage of UNRWA's largesse, which gives out free food and aid without asking questions and deliberate gross inflation in the number of refugees by Palestinians themselves.

=== "The Engagement": A solution to the Israeli–Palestinian conflict ===
==== Concept ====
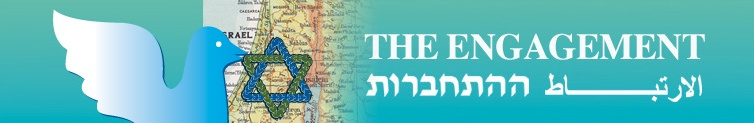
Engagement Movement logo

In contrast to the two commonly discussed solutions to the Israeli–Palestinian conflict—a two state solution (i.e., two states for two people) vs. a one state solution (i.e., a binational state, one state for two peoples)—Misinai believes that the only solution to the Israeli–Palestinian conflict is a third option: a "one state solution for one people." This "one state" integrates Israel proper with the West Bank and Gaza Strip as one territorial unit, while the "one people" consists of both groups being bound and re-defined as one united Israeli-Hebrew nation.

To this end, he argues it is imperative that the majority of Palestinians reclaim their ethnic Hebrew heritage, although he states that this does not mean reverting to Judaism (neither de-Islamization for Palestinian Muslims, nor de-Christianization for Palestinian Christians, etc.), nor does it mean cultural de-Arabization. Instead, it means the adoption of a national consciousness that acknowledges a common Hebrew origin that embraces all those of such a descent, no matter what their current religion, be they Jewish, Muslim, Christian, or Samaritan, and no matter what their culture.

Indeed, already, among the different Jewish ethnic divisions, each has its own traditional community language and distinct traditional culture. It is the amalgam of this diversity that forms Jewish Israeli culture. Likewise, the "Jewish" Israeli culture would continue with this process, but will add the Palestinians' history, culture and religious diversity, and integrate them as aspects of the Hebrew national consciousness.

In order to do so, he believes that the whole concept of Jewishness as the defining factor in Zionism must be re-framed in terms of ethnicity, as opposed to simply religious. Misinai concedes that "The Engagement" might seem like a surreal project, but so too did Zionism initially. "The Engagement", he admits, is a process that requires participation by both sides and mutual acknowledgement of the "other" as a part of oneself.

==== Uni-lateral Engagement ====
As a prelude to creating conditions to make the re-integration of the majority of Palestinians with the Jews possible, Misinai advocates a "Uni-lateral Engagement" in which autonomy is granted for the Palestinian territories and the present Palestinian leaderships are removed.

He states that Israeli operations in Palestinian areas must be designed not only to ensure the safety of Israeli citizens, but also to liberate the Palestinians from the yoke of the Palestinian leaderships whom he accuses of subjugating them and making their lives wretched, feeding them lies, and leading them from one Nakba catastrophe to another, causing untold damage to the entire region and igniting terrorism around the globe. Their entire terror apparatus must be dismantled, and they must be replaced by a new Palestinian leadership devoted to peace. Should any peace-loving Palestinian leadership fail to appear, Israel must enforce its own authority upon all factions in the Palestinian population.

==== Re-engagement process ====
Misinai states that the re-engagement will take one of two forms: Residents without citizenship, or Re-engagement with the People of Israel. The process will be carried out on a family-by-family basis, and in certain instances on an individual basis. In the first stage, which will be carried out gradually among all the Palestinian population, each and every Palestinian (except those suspected of terrorist activity) will have three choices:

- Loyal Residency: An oath of allegiance to the State, and declaration of waiver of citizenship rights for oneself (if the individual declines to opt for the second course of action that follows). This is equivalent to the American green card, but where additionally, one's status is passed to children on the basis of jus sanguinis (by contrast, children of American non-citizens born on US soil are automatically citizens due to jus soli, whatever the status of the parents). Children of individuals (who are Descendant of Israel) who chose this first option may circumvent status of "loyal residency" passed on by their parents if they themselves opt for the second course of action that follows. This choice is available only for those Palestinians who do not wish to rejoin the People of Israel, or who are not Descendants of Israel.
- Re-engagement with the People of Israel: The expressed desire and willingness to rejoin the People of Israel via an oath of allegiance to the State of Israel and its people, the People of Israel, and declaration that one does not belong to the Arab nation.
- Emigration: Emigration and purchase of the émigrés’ house by the State at a fair price (in order not to cause injury to émigrés due to fluctuations in market prices, likely to be depressed by an exodus and surplus of real estate). This choice is available for those Palestinians who, if eligible for the first, or both the first and second options, want neither.

In the event of either of the first two options, neither de-Christianization nor de-Islamization, nor cultural de-Arabization are components of The Engagement. Furthermore, if an individual person wanted to revert to Judaism, this is strictly a personal matter which would be done through the relevant religious channels, which The Engagement process is not a part of in any form.

The Engagement is of a national re-unificationist nature. Most importantly, it is thus far the first that is specifically religiously pluralistic (that is, it acknowledges the People of Israel are today of many faiths), an aspect that lends to its very controversy.

Citizenship sought by members of world Jewry would continue to be dealt with by the requirements and specifications of the Law of Return. Persons who are neither Jews nor Palestinians, and are seeking residency or citizenship, would follow naturalisation processes and requirements separate from both the Law of Return and The Engagement.

===== Requirements =====
Under the scheme while each new member would not be required to convert to Judaism, they would, however, be required to gain mastery of the following:

- The Hebrew language (including reading and writing).
- The culture of the People of Israel.
- The history of the People of Israel, including the forced conversion of their ancestors.
- The history of Eretz-Israel.
- The Tanakh.
- Jewish religious tradition.

The scope of knowledge or proficiencies required would be equal to that of most secular Jews, and would ensure that the act of re-engagement would have sufficient quality and depth. The scope of knowledge would actually be far greater than that required in conventional conversion to Judaism, and would not exclusively focus on matters of faith and ritual. This is in order to provide a cognitive counterweight to the hostile education and incitement that Palestinians have been subjected to in the past in regard to Israel. Moreover, it will serve to enhance the level of education of participants to enable them to successfully integrate into Israeli society without being marginalised or becoming second-class citizens. Such education, outlined in Option Two above, will continue for a number of years and will be accomplished in a framework similar to the Hebrew language ulpans (intense six month ‘total immersion’ crash-courses designed to inculcate basic mastery of Hebrew by new immigrants in Israel). The children of such Palestinians will be enrolled in the Israeli school system, compulsory education just as their Israeli counterparts.

The other requirements of enrollees in the scheme are as follows:

- Declare their renunciation of their association to the Arab Nation. This, Misinai asserts, does not mean dis-association from Arab culture.
- Take a short bath in a Mikveh to remove influence of potential intermarriage with people other than the people of Israel during the generations. This, Misinai states, has a purely national meaning and does not impose any religious undertaking on the person taking it.
- Take an oath of allegiance to the People of Israel and the State of Israel.
- Palestinians who complete the process of re-joining the People of Israel and are not yet Israeli citizens will receive Israeli citizenship. All re-joining Palestinians will be registered with either an Israeli or a Jewish nationality according to their choice.

===== Benefits =====
Those who choose the first path (loyal residency only) will have the option to choose an Arab Islamic (or Christian) education school track, with an abridged Israeli curriculum. The children of those who choose the second path (re-engagement) will be required to enroll in the regular Israeli school system. Only those who complete Israeli education and belong to the second option (the re-engagement path) can progress to the third step – service in the IDF, taking an oath of allegiance to the Jewish People.

At the beginning, the IDF will establish special units for this population (similar to separate minority units of Bedouin, Druze and Circassians in the formative years of the IDF). Palestinians who are above draft age will undergo abridged military service (current policy for older new Jewish immigrants), then be integrated into the IDF reserve system. Only Palestinians who will serve in the IDF will be eligible for Israeli citizenship (except for those with serious health issues or those who are too old, who receive exemptions). Only the army will have the prerogative to decide which candidates for military service should do civil service in place of military service. Citizenship will carry eligibility for certain civil rights including the right to vote for the Knesset and benefits such as receipt of better social benefits for veterans including higher children's allowances. A citizen who betrays the state will lose his citizenship and be harshly punished. Similarly, a loyal resident who will abridge his oath of allegiance will lose his or her Residency rights and be deported, in particularly serious cases, after offenders complete their sentence.

===== Exceptions =====
Only those considered to be Descendants of Israel would benefit from the scheme. Tsvi Misinai states that only a small minority of the Palestinian who are presently outside of the Land of Israel (i.e., the refugees or diaspora) have significant rights over Western Eretz-Yisrael. That right belongs to the original Descendants of the People of Israel (i.e., the Jews, a majority of Palestinians presently in the Land of Israel, and a minority of Palestinians presently outside the Land of Israel), and to the Descendants of the Roman Army (whose historic rights in Eretz-Israel are, however, much lesser than those of the Descendants of Israel).

The majority of the Descendants of the Roman Army are presently in Jordan, and despite their long-standing seniority rights in Israel, they must remain there, as most emigrated to Jordan of their own free will after the Six-Day War of 1967. The only exception to this is specific cases of family reunion.

On the other hand, Brethren of Israel, being native to the land east of the Jordan river, only those who are presently in the Land of Israel will be eligible for "loyal residency", unless they opt for emigration. Those Brethren of Israel who are presently outside of the Land of Israel (a majority among Palestinian refugees) will not be eligible for "loyal residency", nor a right of return to the Land of Israel. They possess a right of return to Jordan. This is because they are not ethnically Jews, and their historic Jewish identity came about by forced conversions to Judaism, as is the case with Islam. Furthermore, their rights to Israel go back only 170 years, and are superseded by those of the Jews and Descendants of Israel, who have a historic connection to the land, spanning several thousand years.

=== Reactions ===
==== Support ====
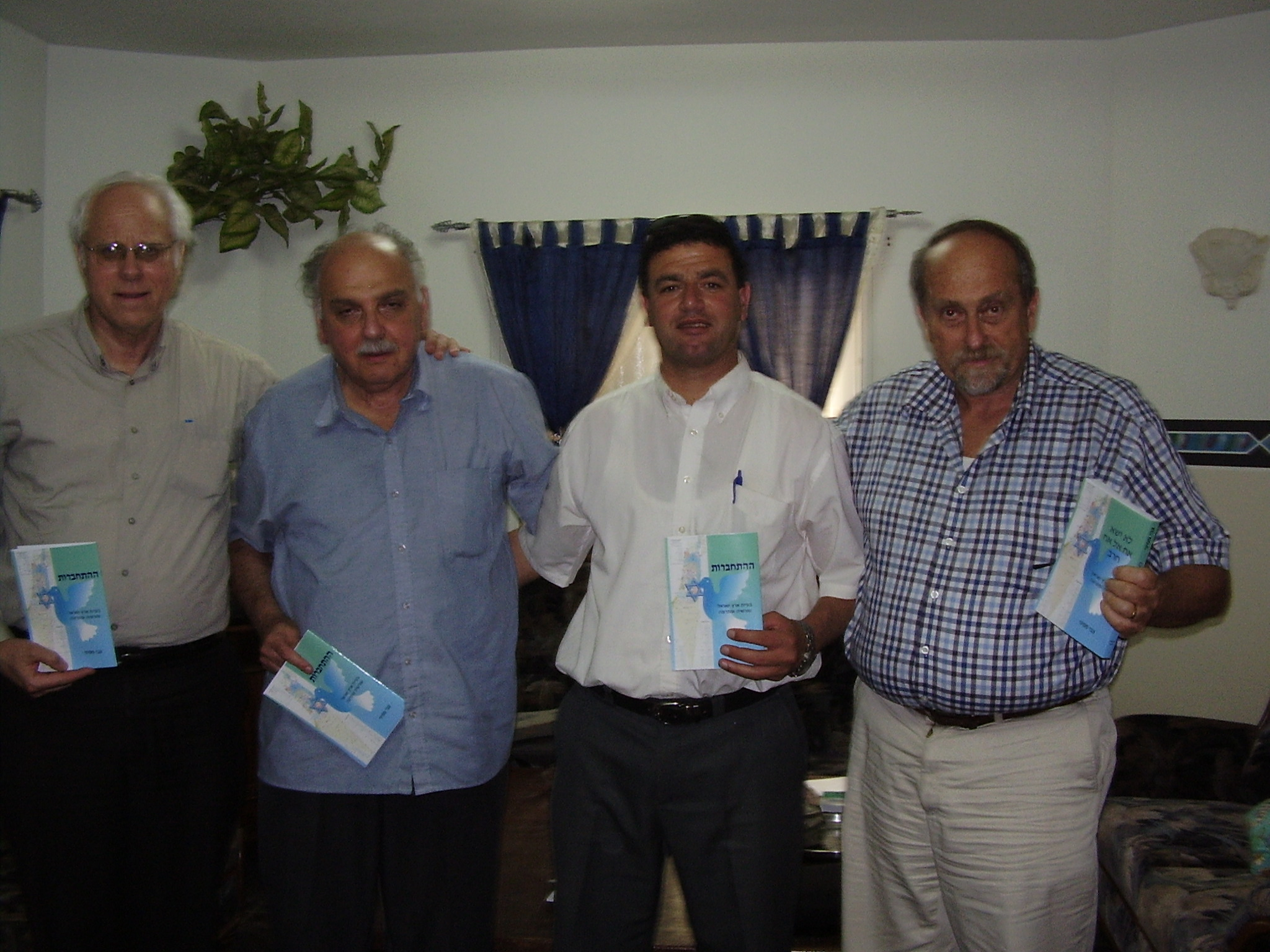
Holding copies of The Engagement Movement booklet (from left onwards), Misinai, Mordechai Nisan, Asher Shlein, and Mounir Al-Krenawi, Kadima Party politician and the first Bedouin member of the Engagement Movement

Tsvi Misinai's theory does have its supporters among some Palestinians, including Sulaiman al-Hamri, a Fatah official from Bethlehem, and former Palestinian Authority minister Ziad Abuzayyad, who asked Misinai to prepare Arabic language versions of his thesis and the Engagement booklet. He has also gained support among some Jews, including at least one Israeli government minister who so far has remained unidentified.

Among Bedouins, a key vocal supporter of Misinai's theory has been Sheikh Salem al-Huzeil, the head of the "Our State" Movement and a prominent leader of the Al-Huzeil tribe from Rahat. In October 2009, with the aim of furthering Jewish and Bedouin ties, Al-Huzeil organised a meeting with Misinai and the religious- Zionist “Hit’habrut” (Joining Together) Movement, in which he maintained that most of his tribal ancestors were Jewish prior to their forced conversion during the Muslim conquest approximately 1,300 years ago.

The Sheikh's act, however, was not without any repercussions. In the immediate month following the meeting, the Sheikh was the recipient of numerous death threats from Bedouins enraged at his efforts to maintain friendly relations with the Jewish community and to demonstrate for the release of kidnapped soldier Gilad Shalit. Posters were distributed calling for the death of Sheikh al-Huzeil. Moreover, several members of his family suffered severe burns after rival Bedouins set his house on fire in Rahat.

Additionally, some Haredi Jewish settler leaders have also welcomed the idea with great enthusiasm, since they believe that once the entire biblical land of Israel is populated with Jews, a new era of peace on Earth will be ushered in. Rabbi Dov Stein, secretary and one of the seven-member leadership council of the current nascent Sanhedrin (a Jewish religious council of 200 rabbis modelled on the biblical Sanhedrin rulers of Jerusalem), also supports the Hebrew origin of most Palestinians.

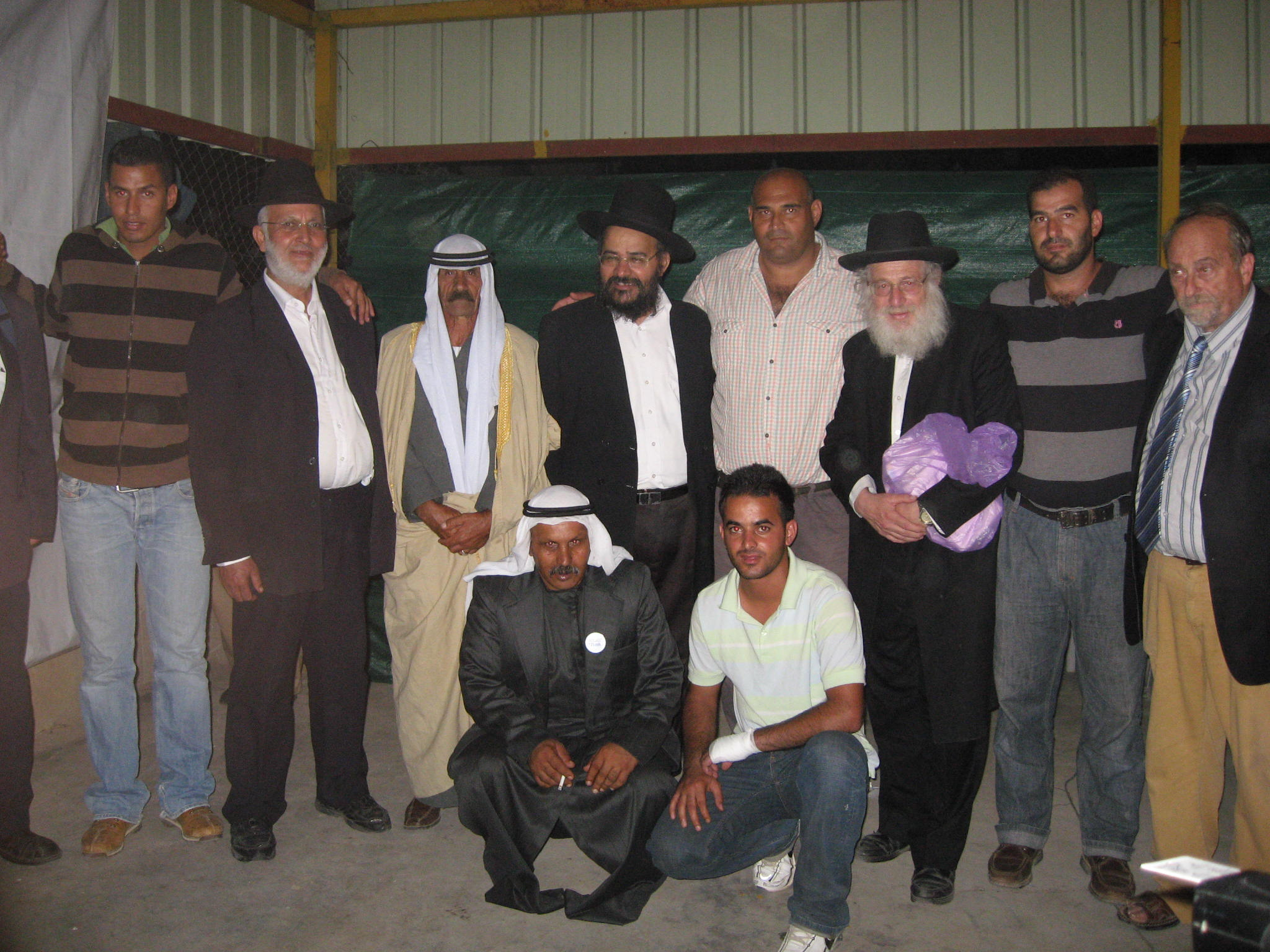
Misinai (far right) at a meeting with elders from the Bedouin Al-Huzeil tribe which claims Jewish descent and Sanhedrin members, which took place in Rahat on 13 October 2009

Stein, however, as an Orthodox Jew, differs with Misinai on its implications, since he sees Jewish nationhood as primarily defined by religious affiliation to Judaism, even where one may not necessarily be of Hebrew ancestral origin, and not defined by Hebrew ancestral origin. Stein asserts that it's because the Jews uphold the Torah that they have the right to Israel. Therefore, in order to be accepted, Stein argues that the Palestinians must give up Islam and embrace Judaism as a prerequisite for re-joining the Jewish people.

Among Israeli academics and intellectuals, Tsvi Misinai has received the avid support of Mordechai Nisan, a professor and scholar of Middle East Studies from the Hebrew University in Jerusalem. Nisan was also asked by the Sanhedrin to serve as its professional consultant on this issue, while Elon Yarden, an attorney who has written a series of books about the land of Israel and its inhabitants, has also reached the same conclusion as Misinai.

Among the Druze, Druze MK Ayoob Kara of the Likud party agrees with Misinai's claim about the Druze, and further postulates that all Druze rather than just a few villages, are actually descended from Jews who were forced to convert to Islam. Kara has even gone as far as saying that he can bring forward genetic evidence to prove it.

==== Criticism ====
Misinai's thesis and work has also garnered controversy, both at home and abroad, among some Palestinians and Jews alike, with the criticisms mostly coming from the Palestinian side.

One Palestinian intellectual, Ismail Al-Shindi, professor of Islamic Jurisprudence at Al-Quds Open University denied that Jews ever maintained a sizeable population in the land of Palestine, or that they were forcibly converted by the Ottomans, and he even went as far as to accuse Misinai of "falsifying" history to Hebraize Palestinians. Another Palestinian, Kamel Katalo, professor of Sociology at Al-Khalil University in Hebron, has stated that he has read Tsvi Misinai's booklet and come to the conclusion that Misinai makes strident generalisations and reaches spurious and completely erroneous conclusions based on questionable premises, stating that there is no such thing as a "Jewish gene".

His most notable Arab Israeli critic is the former Balad MK, Azmi Bishara, who dismissed his thesis as yet another Jewish plot to remove the Palestinians from their land. Misinai has accused both the Israeli and Palestinian authorities of being indifferent to his findings.

== Literature ==
Tsvi Misinai has written two books on this subject, Hearing is Believing – The Roots and the Solution to the Eretz-Israel Problem explaining his thesis and detailing numerous testimonies, linguistic and name similarities, genetic and natural science findings, cultural and religious similarities, as well as a shortened version Brother Shall not Lift Sword against Brother. The former is available only in Hebrew under the title Ye’amen ki Yisupar – Ba’ayat Eretz-Israel, Shorasheha oo-Pitronah, with the latter being available in Hebrew and English, as well as an Arabic version which was released in 2010.

== Works ==
- Hearing is Believing – The Roots and the Solution to the Eretz-Israel Problem (available only in Hebrew, formal launch March 2006)
- Brother Shall not Lift Sword against Brother (formal launch 2007)
