= Dan Goldstein =

Israeli entrepreneur (1954–2022)

- דן גולדשטיין
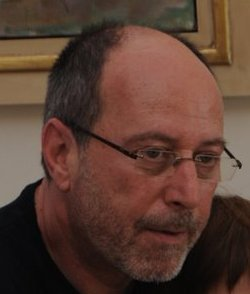
- Born: 19 June 1954; Bucharest, Romania
- Died: 9 June 2022 (aged 67)
- Education: The Tel Aviv University
- Occupation: Entrepreneur
- Employer: Formula Vision Technologies
- Known for: Pioneering Israeli Hitech
- Title: Chairman of the Board
- Spouse: Keren Yehezkeli

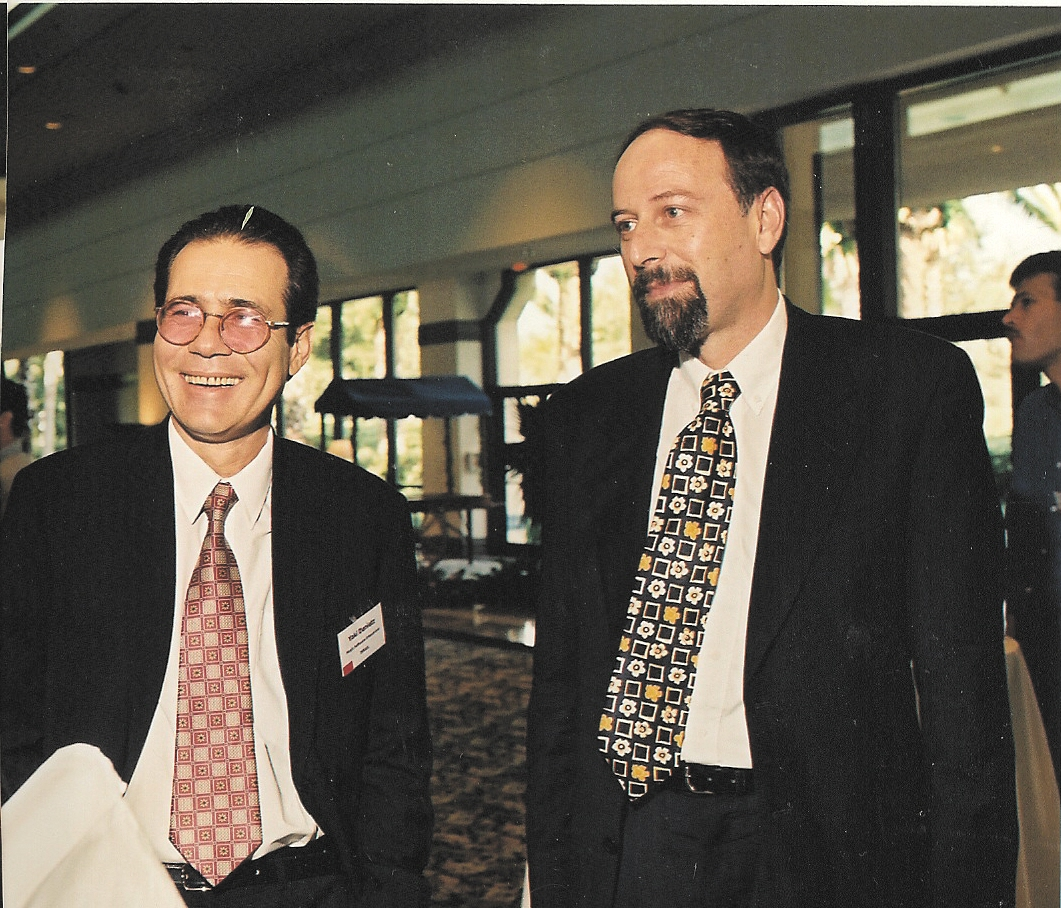
Dan Goldstein (right) and Yaki Dunietz, Orlando, Fl. 1998

Dan Goldstein (Hebrew: דן גולדשטיין; 19 June 1954 – 9 June 2022) was a pioneer of the Israeli software industry. He was the founder of Formula Systems, sold in 2006, and Formula Vision Technologies. Goldstein served as Chairman of the Public Companies Association in Israel.

== Biography ==
Dan Goldstein was born in Bucharest, Romania. He immigrated to Israel with his family in 1960. After completing his BA in computer science and mathematics and an MA in business administration, he studied for a PhD in mathematics.

== Business and investment career ==
In 1980, while writing his doctoral thesis on distributed networks, he founded Formula Software Services, providing professional software services to Israeli customers. By 1985 he expanded to other areas such as software products and consulting, and in 1985 he founded Formula Systems (1985) Ltd., as a holding corporation for his software products, services and consulting activities. In 1988 he acquired control of a publicly traded company named "Eichut Computers", which he turned into the communications arm of the developing Formula Group. He later acquired "Idan Inc.", a public company traded on Nasdaq, and nominated Ami Harel as its CEO. This company was a pioneer in the developing Israeli communications market in the late 1980s and early 1990s, before the accelerated regulation of overseas voice and data communication. As the group grew, Goldstein formulated an investment strategy of specialization in software products and services for vertical markets. He acquired controlling interests in a number of young companies, such as Applicom, a software house for minicomputers, Wiztech, which specialized in Billing, and Crystal, which specialized in large conversion projects. By 1990 Goldstein established the position of Formula Systems as a leading software group in Israel. He founded Foraz, the first Israeli Venture Capital Fund, together with Liraz, a publicly traded company headed by Arik Kilman. Goldstein later acquired Liraz's share in the fund, and later acquired control of Liraz itself.

In the 1990s, Goldstein acquired other technology companies. He bought a Telecom billing company headed by Amos Sivan and changed its name to Formula Telecom Solutions (FTS), acquired an insurance software company headed by Zeev Alon and renamed it Formula Insurance Solutions (FIS), a retail software company called "Az-Ben", which he renamed Formula Retail Solutions (FRS), and a Travel solutions company headed by Menahem Shaked, which he named Formula Travel Solutions. He also acquired Nikuv Computers, one of the first publicly traded software services companies in Israel specializing in Salary calculation, which owned a prevalent ERP system for small and medium clients. Throughout this decade, some of Goldstein's earlier investments have reached a size which justified public offerings, and raised funds on The Tel Aviv Stock Exchange, the AIM market in London, and on Nasdaq: Crystal Software Solutions and Wiztech (later wholly acquired by Convergys) were the first two greatly successful offerings, followed by ForSoft, the traditional Software Services arm of the group throughout the 90s. Goldstein's holding company, Formula Systems also started trading on Nasdaq. He also founded a new Venture Capital Fund, Formula Ventures headed by Shay Beilis, and acquired a controlling interest in Sapiens.

== Acquisition of Mashov Group ==
In 1998 Goldstein acquired control of the Mashov Group. This publicly traded group of technology companies headed by Yaki Dunietz and David Assia, consisted of established businesses such as Magic Software Enterprises, Babylon, Paradigm Geophysical and Walla! Communications. This acquisition, combined with the effects of the technology bubble which resulted in high evaluations of technology companies, brought The Formula Group to evaluations exceeding a billion dollars. In February 2000, Goldstein led a secondary public offering of Magic Software Enterprises on Nasdaq, raising over $100 Million, at a valuation of $750 million. During this period, Goldstein partnered and worked with major players in the world of finance, such as Deutsche Bank, Citibank, and all major Israeli investment banks, Mezzanine funds such as FIMI, Shamrock (Disney's investment arm), Discount Investments and many more. By the end of the millennium, Goldstein was by far the most prominent technology-oriented entrepreneur in Israel.

In March 2000, one month after Magic Software's successful secondary offering for a record evaluation, the technology bubble started to burst. Apart from the companies included in the Mashov portfolio, Goldstein was not heavily invested in the technology sector. Goldstein decided to reorganize, and entirely changed the corporate structure of the group he controlled. He consolidated and simplified the complicated multi-level corporate structure, which was a half arbitrary result of many historical and fiscal reasons. Formula Systems remained the top level holding company, with 3 distinct holdings: Matrix (formerly Forsoft), which merged and acquired all wholly owned group members which were synergetic with its business (including education companies such as John Bryce and Sivan, hardware companies such as 2D, Syntech, software companies such as Applicom), Magic Software Enterprises, and Formula Vision (formerly Mashov Computers). This reorganization also included sale of holdings (e.g., Walla! Communications and Paradigm Geophysical, both mature holdings acquired with the Mashov Group) which were minority holdings, or not synergetic with other group activities.

In parallel, Goldstein attempted to bring new investors into the group. One such attempt in 2001–2002 failed, because the investor turned out to be an unfunded and unfounded roll up operation. In 2004, Goldstein decided to bring in an equal partner for the first time. Control of the Formula Group was transferred to Fimgold, a partnership between Goldstein and the FIMI opportunity fund, headed by Ishay Davidi. This move was intended to "contribute to and upgrade the Company’s operations, help in the crystallization of the Company’s new strategy, and at the end of the day will add value to the Company’s shareholders". In the years that followed, Goldstein found himself leading a publicly traded corporate pyramid as well as a group of young, promising yet struggling companies in the portfolio of Formula Vision. In 2006, he received an offer from Emblaze, another public company, run by Guy Bernstein. Emblaze acquired Formula in December of that year, and Goldstein parted from the company he founded and managed for 25 years, in favor of a de facto start-up incubator, Formula Vision.

== Public office ==
From 2000, Goldstein was Chairman of The Public Companies Association in Israel. As such, he was very involved in legislation and public debate over issues pertaining to subjects such as corporate governance, financial regulation, reporting and accounting standards. He was a demanded speaker in panels, typically representing corporate business interests. Goldstein also served on the Israeli Advisory Boards of TAU Recanati, the Recanati Business School in Tel Aviv University, and of The Merage Foundation for U.S-Israel Trade. Goldstein also served as The chairman of the Board of Trustees of The Tel Aviv Academic College of Engineering. In 2015 he was appointed CEO of the Israel Postal Authority.

== Death ==
Goldstein died on 9 June 2022, at the age of 67.
