= Formula Systems =

Israeli company

Formula Systems (1985) Ltd.
- Type: Public
- Traded as: Nasdaq: FORTY, TASE: FORT
- Industry: Conglomerate
- Predecessor: Formula Software Services
- Founded: 1985; 41 years ago
- Founder: Dan and Gad Goldstein
- Headquarters: Or Yehuda, Israel
- Key people: Guy Bernstein (CEO)
- Revenue: ▲US$640.62 million (2012)
- Operating income: ▲US$49.24 million (2012)
- Net income: ▲US$42.96 million (2012)
- Parent: Asseco Poland S.A.
- Subsidiaries: Matrix IT; Magic Software Enterprises; Sapiens International Corporation
- Website: formulasystems.com

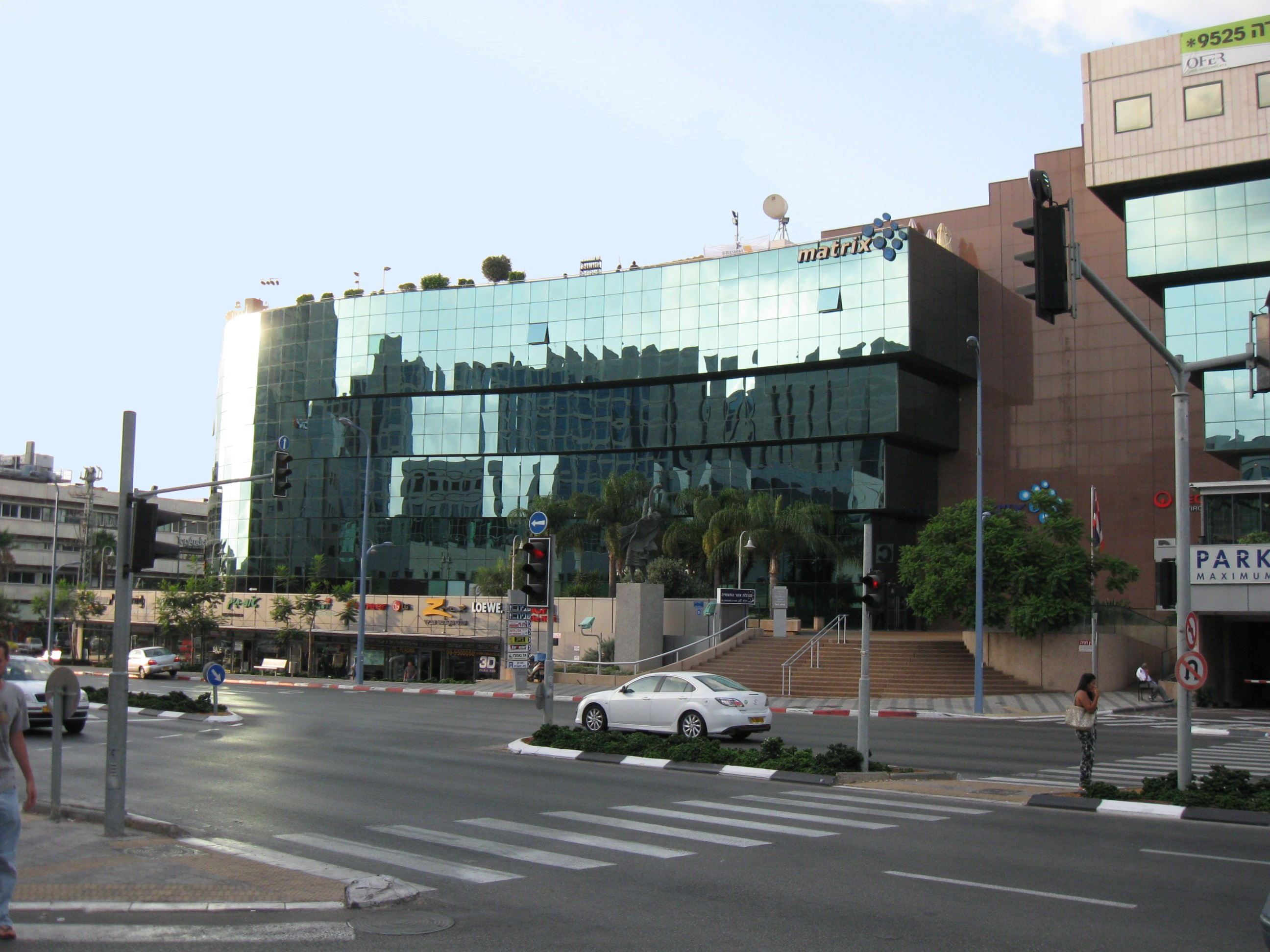
Formula Systems' former Headquarters in Herzliya

Formula Systems (1985) Ltd. (Hebrew: פורמולה מערכות) is a publicly traded holding company headquartered in Or Yehuda, Israel. Through its subsidiaries it operates mainly in the area of information technology. Shares of Formula Systems are traded on the NASDAQ Global Select Market and on the Tel Aviv Stock Exchange. In 2010 Polish software maker Asseco acquired a 50.2% stake in the company.

== History ==
Formula Systems was founded in 1985 by Dan Goldstein and his brother Gad. Dan Goldstein, who had an undergraduate degree in math and computer science and a master's in business management, had been a doctoral student at Tel Aviv University when, in 1981, he decided to leave the academic world and direct his efforts toward the private sector instead. He established a software company, which he called Formula Software Solutions, serving such clients as Egged and Mekorot, and recruited brother Gad Goldstein to work alongside him. Soon the two co-founded Formula Systems, as well as many other technology companies. Until 1998, the company established its position as a technology oriented holding company. As such, it created, developed and invested in a number of the early companies, floated and traded on Nasdaq such as BluePhoenix, Wiztech, Matrix, Sapiens International Corporation and many others. In 1998 Formula Systems acquired control of the Mashov Group, including assets such as Magic Software Enterprises, Walla!, Paradigm Geophysical, Babylon (software) and others. In 2005, Dan Goldstein separated Formula Systems into two separate entities, by spinning off all the young start-up companies under Mashov Computers, which he renamed Formula Vision. Goldstein sold his share in Formula Systems to the Emblaze Group, and dedicated himself to the cultivation of several struggling yet promising start-ups.

In 2006, 33.6% of Formula was owned by Emblaze Group. In late 2010, Polish software maker Asseco, a subsidiary of Asseco Group, acquired a 50.2% stake in Formula Systems.

== Subsidiaries ==
Formula Systems' portfolio has changed over the years, but always with an emphasis on software engineering. At various times it included Magic Software Enterprises, Crystal Systems, Liraz, Sivan, Matrix IT, Sapiens International Corporation, New Applicom, Sintec, nextSource, and BluePhoenix Solutions. As of fiscal year 2010, Formula retains a majority interest in three public companies: Sapiens International Corporation N.V. (71.6%), Magic Software Enterprises (51.7%), and Matrix (50.1%).

== See also ==
- TA BlueTech Index
- List of Israeli companies quoted on the Nasdaq
