= Sapiens International Corporation =

Israeli software company

Sapiens International Corporation N.V.
- Type: Private
- Industry: Computer software, insurance software
- Founded: 1982; 44 years ago
- Founder: Tsvi Misinai; Tuvi Orbach; Shai Sole
- Headquarters: London, United Kingdom
- Services: Software for the insurance industry
- Owner: Advent International
- Number of employees: 5,000
- Subsidiaries: Sapiens America; Sapiens North America; Sapiens Technologies; Sapiens (UK) Limited
- Website: sapiens.com

Sapiens International Corporation N.V. is a privately held company that develops computer software for the insurance industry. The company was listed on the NASDAQ and Tel Aviv Stock Exchange under the ticker SPNS until it was taken private in December 2025.

On December 17, 2025, Advent International completed the purchase of the company.

== History ==
Sapiens grew out of an initiative, dubbed DB1, undertaken by a group of scientists from the Weizmann Institute of Science during the 1970s to develop an object-oriented application generator for use with mainframe computers.

In 1972, Tsvi Misinai, a graduate of the Technion, started the project together with Shai Sole, Shmuel Timor, and Eli Raban. In the late 1970s and early 1980s, the Weizmann team partnered with a local Israeli company, Advanced Automated Applications (AAA), founded by Tuvi Orbach.

In 1984, the Weizmann team established its own company, which was later merged with AAA and joined by entrepreneurs Ron Zuckerman and Shaul Shani. The company separated from the Weizmann Institute and was incorporated under the name Sapiens.

In 1992, shares of Sapiens began trading on the NASDAQ exchange. By 1993, Sapiens had 900 workers at 33 branches worldwide and a market capitalization of $340 million.

During the latter half of the 1990s, Sapiens developed a business rules technology (eMerge) and legacy modernization products. It worked on updating information systems for the Year 2000 problem. In 1999, annual revenues reached $91 million.

=== Refocusing on insurance software ===
In 2001, Dan Goldstein, then chairman of The Formula Group, became chairman of Sapiens, and the company narrowed its focus to insurance software.

In November 2005, Roni Al-Dor joined Sapiens as president and CEO after serving at TTI Telecom. He stepped down at the end of 2025 following the Advent acquisition.

In 2010, Sapiens acquired Harcase, a Canadian software company that developed a policy administration suite for property and casualty insurance.

In 2011, Goldstein carried out a three-way merger between Sapiens and two subsidiaries of Formula Vision, Formula Insurance Solutions (FIS) and IDIT.

=== Additional acquisitions ===
In March 2015, Sapiens acquired IBEXI Solutions, an India-based insurance technology provider, and in July 2015 it acquired Insseco, a Poland-based insurance software provider, for $9.1 million. In February 2017, it acquired U.S.-based StoneRiver, Inc. for approximately $102 million.

Further acquisitions expanded its regional presence: Maximum Processing in North America (2016), Cálculo in Spain (2019), the German insurtech sum.cumo GmbH for up to €28.4 million (2019), and Tia Technology from EQT Mid Market (2020).

=== Acquisition by Advent International ===
In August 2025, Sapiens agreed to be acquired by the private equity firm Advent International in an all-cash transaction valued at about $2.5 billion, or $43.50 per share, a premium of about 64 percent over the closing price of $26.52 on August 8, 2025. Formula Systems, which held about 44 percent of Sapiens, retained a minority stake.

Shareholders approved the deal on November 19, 2025, and it closed on December 17, 2025, after which the shares were delisted.

In June 2026, a subsidiary of the Abu Dhabi Investment Authority (ADIA) acquired a minority stake in Sapiens on undisclosed terms, and the company moved its global headquarters to London.

== Products ==
Sapiens develops insurance software for life insurance, property and casualty, workers' compensation, reinsurance, decision management, and financial and compliance functions. Its core platforms are CoreSuite for life insurance and IDITSuite for property and casualty lines.

== See also ==
- Silicon Wadi
- List of Israeli companies quoted on the Nasdaq
- TA BlueTech Index
