= BluePhoenix Solutions =

Israeli IT company

BluePhoenix Solutions Ltd.
- Company type: Public
- Traded as: Nasdaq: BPHX
- Industry: Technology
- Predecessor: A. Crystal Solutions Ltd.(1987–1996); Crystal Systems Solutions Ltd. (1996–2003)
- Fate: Merger with ATERAS in 2014
- Successor: Modern Systems
- Headquarters: Herzliya, Israel
- Key people: Matt Bell; Rick Oppedisano; John Regan; David Wurman; Itai Ben-Dor; Yuri Steinschreiber; Florin Sunel
- Services: Business software
- Number of employees: 105

BluePhoenix Solutions Ltd. was a publicly traded company, headquartered in Israel, that develops and sells modernization services for legacy information technology systems. Its shares were traded on the NASDAQ Global Market exchange.

In 2014, BluePhoenix and ATERAS Complete Merger and Commence Operations as Modern Systems. In 2019 Modern Systems was acquired by OneAdvanced.

== Company ==
BluePhoenix Solutions specializes in the modernization of corporate legacy databases and applications. The firm's automated translation platform serves as a base to provide services for clients updating legacy systems to more modern computing platforms.

== History ==
BluePhoenix Solutions was founded by Aaron Crystal in 1987 under the name A. Crystal Solutions. Soon afterwards Formula Systems acquired control of the company, while the founder retained some of his shares and continued to serve as the company's CEO until 1996, when its name was changed to Crystal Systems Solutions and it went public on Nasdaq under the leadership of Dan Goldstein and his brother Gad. In January 1997 the company's shares began trading on what was then the NASDAQ National Market under the symbol CRYSF. Among the company's clients were Microsoft, Synopsys and Bank Leumi. In 2003 the name Crystal Systems was changed again, this time to BluePhoenix Solutions, subsequent to a merger of Crystal Systems with Liraz Systems, of which BluePhoenix was a subsidiary. BluePhoenix functioned as a subsidiary of Formula Systems until June 2007, when Formula sold its shares in the company to international institutional investors. In 2009, BluePhoenix Solutions acquired DSKnowledge Ltd. In 2012, a new investment group appointed Matt Bell CEO. Bell conducted a dramatic reorganization, strengthening the company's financials and refocusing on core legacy modernization solutions.

In February, 2004, BluePhoenix Solutions joined the Object Management Group (OMG), with full voting rights and the ability to submit proposals.

The company's translation platform converts customers from COBOL, Natural/ADABAS, JCL, ICL, IDMS, IMS and to modern platforms like C#, SQL Server, Java, IBM Db2 and more. A project Ringmaster was promoted in 2013.

In 2014, BluePhoenix and ATERAS Complete Merger and Commence Operations as Modern Systems. In 2019 Modern Systems was acquired by OneAdvanced.

=== Acquisitions ===
Company	Year	Price	Reference
SDC-FinansSystem	2002		
IntraComp	2003		
CePost	2004		
CodeStream Software (Xitec)	2006		
ASNA	2007		

== See also ==
- Enterprise engineering
- List of Israeli companies quoted on the Nasdaq
