= EnerSys =

Stored energy systems and technology provider

- Type: Public
- Traded as: NYSE: ENS; S&P 400 Component
- Industry: Energy storage
- Founded: 1999; 27 years ago
- Headquarters: Reading, Pennsylvania, US
- Key people: Shawn O'Connell (CEO)
- Products: Industrial batteries and chargers
- Revenue: $3.6 billion (FY 2025)
- Number of employees: 9000 (2013)
- Website: www.enersys.com/en/

EnerSys is a stored energy systems and technology provider for industrial applications. The company manufactures reserve-power and motive-power batteries, battery chargers, power equipment, battery accessories and outdoor equipment enclosures.

The president and CEO as of 2025 is Shawn O'Connell.

== Products ==
EnerSys produces reserve-power batteries, marketed and sold principally under the Alpha, PowerSafe, DataSafe, Hawker, Genesis, ODYSSEY and CYCLON brands. Motive-power batteries are marketed and sold principally under the Hawker, NexSys, IRONCLAD, General Battery, Fiamm Motive Power, Oldham and Express brands. EnerSys also manufactures and sells related DC power products including chargers, electronic power equipment and a wide variety of battery accessories.

Motive power batteries and chargers are utilized in electric forklift trucks and other commercial and industrial electric powered vehicles. Reserve power batteries are used in the telecommunication and utility industries, uninterruptible power supplies, and other applications requiring stored energy systems. These industries include medical, aerospace and defense systems. With the Alpha acquisition, EnerSys expanded its portfolio to become a fully integrated DC power and energy storage system and technology provider for broadband, telecom and energy storage systems. Outdoor equipment enclosure products are utilized in the telecommunication, cable, utility, and transportation industries, as well as by government and defense customers.

== Acquisitions and joint ventures ==
GS Yuasa
EnerSys, in 2000, acquired Yuasa's industrial division.
Hawker
The Hawker Group merged with EnerSys in 2002.
Invensys
In 2002 EnerSys acquired Energy Storage Products Group of Invensys for $505 million.
ABSL Power Solutions
Acquired in 2011 in the United Kingdom.
Ergon Batteries Ltd.
Acquired in March 2011 they made Lead and Nickel based batteries for motive and reserve power markets in Greece.
GAIA Akkumulatorenwerke GmbH
Based in Germany and acquired in September 2011 they produced lithium-ion battery systems for space, naval, marine, renewable energy, and specialty high power applications.
Powertech Batteries- Industrial Division
A South African company with lead based solutions for reserve and motive power customers that was acquired in October 2011.
Energy Leader Batteries Ltd.
Acquired in March 2012, this Indian based company was a producer of reserve and motive power batteries.
Purcell Systems
In October 2013, EnerSys acquired Purcell Systems a company based in Washington State. They are a leading designer, manufacturer, and marketer of thermally managed electronic equipment and battery cabinet enclosures for customers globally in telecommunication, broadband, utility, rail, and military applications.
UTS Holdings Sdn. Bhd
Based in Malaysia. Acquired in January 2014 with its subsidiaries Battery Power International Pte. Ltd. and IE Technologies Pte. Ltd. based in Singapore. Manufacturer of Motive and Reserve power batteries.
ICS Industries Pty. Ltd
Based in Australia. Acquired in July 2015. The company is a full line shelter designer, manufacturer with installation and maintenance services.
ENSER
Based in Tampa, Florida. Acquired in April 2016. A manufacturer of molten salt "thermal" batteries used in powering a multitude of electronics, guidance, and other electrical loads on many of today's advanced weapon systems.
Alpha Group
On December 10, 2018, EnerSys completed its acquisition of the Alpha Technologies Group of companies, Alpha Group.
