= Magic Software Enterprises =

Software company

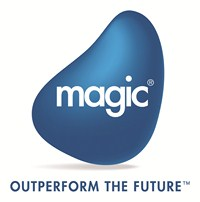
- Type: Public
- Traded as: Nasdaq: MGIC
- Industry: Software
- Founded: 1983; 43 years ago
- Founders: David Assia, Yaki Dunietz
- Headquarters: Or Yehuda, Israel, IL
- Key people: Guy Bernstein, CEO
- Products: Magic xpa Application Platform; Magic xpi Integration Platform
- Revenue: ▲$201.6 million (2016)
- Number of employees: 2500+ (2022)
- Website: Magic Software Enterprises

Magic Software Enterprises Ltd (MSE) is a global enterprise software company headquartered in Or Yehuda, Israel that was listed on Nasdaq and the Tel Aviv Stock Exchange until it was sold to Matrix IT Ltd. in February 2026.

It provides low-code integration and data management platforms that simplify the connection between legacy on-premise systems and modern cloud applications. Its flagship products (Magic xpi Integration Platform and FactoryEye Smart Factory Solution) enable enterprises to achieve end-to-end visibility, faster cloud migration, and managed integration services.

== History ==
Magic Software Enterprises was founded in 1983 by David Assia and Yaki Dunietz as a spin-off from "Mashov Computers", a publicly traded Israeli company that provided business solutions on microcomputers. The new company was originally named "Mashov Software Export (MSE)", and developed software for the global market, specifically an application generator named Magic.

Mashov’s major innovation was a metadata-driven approach to programming that required no compiling or linking, and also allowed instantaneous debugging. The Magic platform was originally designed and developed by Jonathan (Yoni) Hashkes, along with Miko Hasson who was responsible for programme management. During the 1980s, the company grew due to its sales of the DOS and UNIX platforms. The product was used by many large organizations, including the Israel Defense Forces.

In 1991, the company changed its name to "Magic Software Enterprises" (retaining the acronym: MSE) and became the first Israeli software company to go public on the NASDAQ. During this period, the company developed a close relationship with IBM, focusing on AS/400 systems. In mid-1995, the first version of Magic for Windows was released.

In 1998, Magic was acquired by the Formula Group, headed by Dan Goldstein. In February 2000, it raised over $100 million and traded at a company valuation of $1 billion.

In 2001, Magic released "eDeveloper" (Rohan), a graphical, rules-based, and event-driven framework that offered a pre-compiled engine for database business tasks and a wide variety of generic runtime services and functions.
In February 2001, Menachem Hasfari replaced Jack Dunitz as CEO after a series of failures that led the company to post two successive profit warnings.
In 2007, Guy Bernstein was appointed chairman of the board at Magic Software Enterprises, replacing David Assia. Prior to that, Bernstein had served as Chief Financial and Operations Officer of Magic Software since 1999. Guy Bernstein was appointed CEO of Magic Software Enterprises in April 2010.

In 2003, Magic released the "iBOLT" integration platform. In July 2008, it released the first version of the "uniPaaS" application platform, replacing eDeveloper. In 2011, Magic released a .NET version of uniPaaS, and launched a new offering for enterprise mobility. In May 2012, Magic launched a company-wide rebranding, including new product names and a new logo and tagline. uniPaaS was renamed "Magic xpa Application Platform" and iBOLT was renamed "Magic xpi Integration Platform". The Magic xpi Integration Platform was enhanced to include In-Memory Data Grid (IMDG) technology from GigaSpaces.

In 2016, Magic entered into an agreement to acquire a 60% equity interest in Roshtov Software Industries for $21 million with an option to acquire 100% of the equity in Roshtov, developer of the Clicks platform used in patient-file oriented software solutions for managed care and healthcare providers.

== See also ==
- Formula Systems
- List of Israeli companies quoted on the Nasdaq
