= Evogene =

Evogene Ltd.
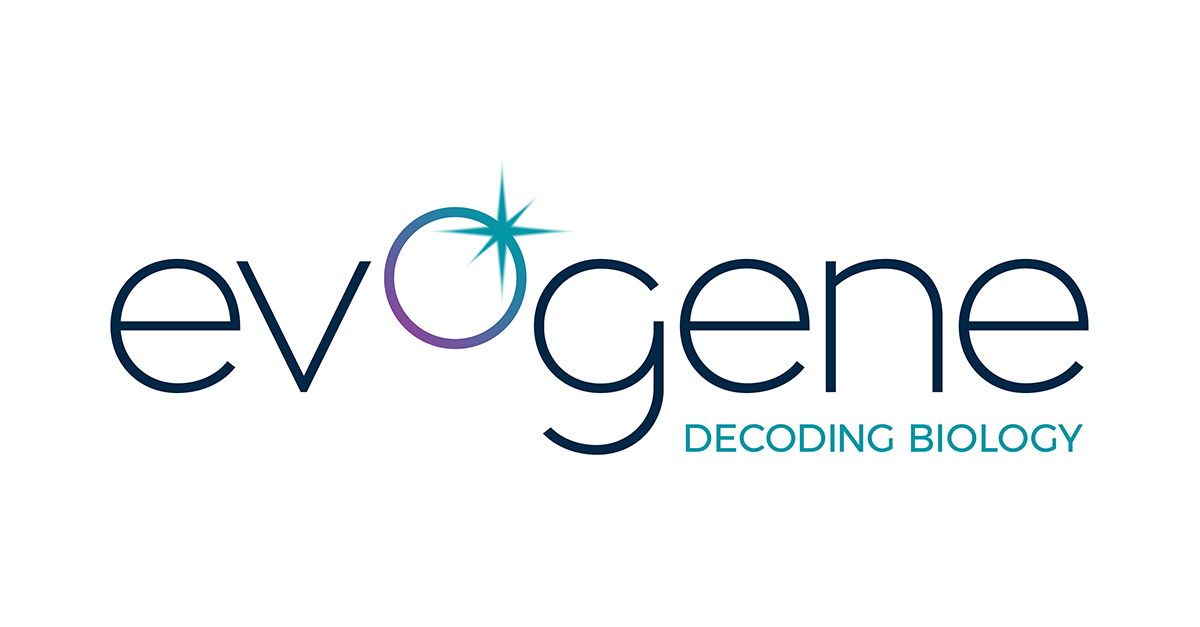
- Company type: Public
- Traded as: TASE: EVGN; NYSE: EVGN
- Industry: Computational chemistry
- Founded: 2002
- Founder: Dr. Hagai Karchi; Dr. Rafi Meissner
- Headquarters: Rehovot, Israel
- Key people: Nir Nimrodi, Chairperson; Ofer Haviv, President & CEO
- Subsidiaries: AgPlenus, Casterra, Biomica, Lavie Bio
- Website: www.evogene.com

Evogene (NASDAQ: EVGN, TASE: EVGN) is a computational chemistry company based in Israel, specializing in the generative design of small molecules for the pharmaceutical and agricultural industries. At the core of its technology is ChemPass AI, a proprietary generative AI engine that enables the design of novel, highly potent small molecules optimized across multiple critical parameters. This powerful platform significantly improves success rates while reducing development time and costs. Built on this powerful technological foundation, and through strategic partnerships alongside internal product development, Evogene is focused on creating breakthrough products driven by the integration of scientific innovation with real-world industry needs.

In 2024, the company began collaborating with Google Cloud to develop an AI-powered generative model aimed at discovering small molecules for drug development and sustainable agriculture.

== Technology and partnerships ==
Evogene has developed computational biology platforms leveraging big data and artificial intelligence (AI), including machine learning algorithms.

In June 2007, Haaretz reported that Evogene announced a collaboration with SunGene of Germany to develop plant biotechnology-engineering techniques. The project was supported by the Israel-Germany BioDisc program, the Israeli Ministry of Science and Technology, and Germany’s Federal Ministry of Education and Research. The collaboration aimed to develop methods for improving gene implantation in crops.

In September 2008, Evogene formed a joint venture with the Leviev Group and Ormat Group to develop and commercialize castor plants for biodiesel production in Namibia.

In June 2009, Evogene signed a licensing agreement with Syngenta to develop soybean strains resistant to nematode pests. The agreement included research funding, milestone payments, and potential royalties, and was part of Evogene’s ongoing collaborations with firms such as Monsanto and Bayer.

In March 2015, The Times of Israel reported that Evogene was using genomic technologies, including its PointHit platform, to analyze molecules in weeds and identify plant macromolecules for herbicide development. The article also noted that Monsanto was a major investor in the company.

In July 2018, Evogene partnered with Brazil’s Instituto Mato-grossense do Algodão (IMAmt) to identify genes for insect-resistant cotton targeting the boll weevil and fall armyworm.

In June 2020, The Jerusalem Post reported that Evogene was among the companies selected to participate in a NIS 36 million consortium funded by the Israel Innovation Authority to develop genome editing tools using CRISPR and artificial intelligence.

Evogene states that its computational platform is designed to improve the efficiency of life-science product development by leveraging big data and AI. The company reports that its approach aims to reduce development time and cost while identifying potential products with lower toxicity. Its reported partners include BASF (OTCQX:BASFY), Bayer (OTCPK:BAYZF), Corteva (CTVA), ICL Group Ltd. (ICL) as well as academic and medical institutions.

=== Subsidiaries ===
In October 2014, Evogene’s subsidiary Evofuel signed an agreement with the Brazilian Agricultural Research Corporation (Embrapa) to develop castor cultivation technologies for biofuel production.

In August 2022, The Jerusalem Post reported that Evogene’s subsidiary Biomica began a Phase I clinical trial for its microbiome-based drug candidate BMC128 at Rambam Health Care Campus. The drug, developed using Evogene’s MicroBoost AI platform, is designed to improve cancer patients’ response to immunotherapy. In December 2022, Biomica secured a $20 million funding agreement led by Shanghai Healthcare Capital to advance its microbiome-based therapeutics.

In June 2023, Casterra, a subsidiary of Evogene, signed a $9.1 million agreement with an international oil and gas company to supply castor seeds for biofuel production in Africa. According to The Times of Israel, the seeds were developed using genomic methods based on Evogene’s computational platform to increase oil yield.
