= List of people from New Jersey =

State flag of New Jersey

Location of New Jersey in the United States

The following is a list of notable individuals who were born, raised, or have a strong association with the U.S. state of New Jersey.

== Born and raised in New Jersey ==
=== A–F ===
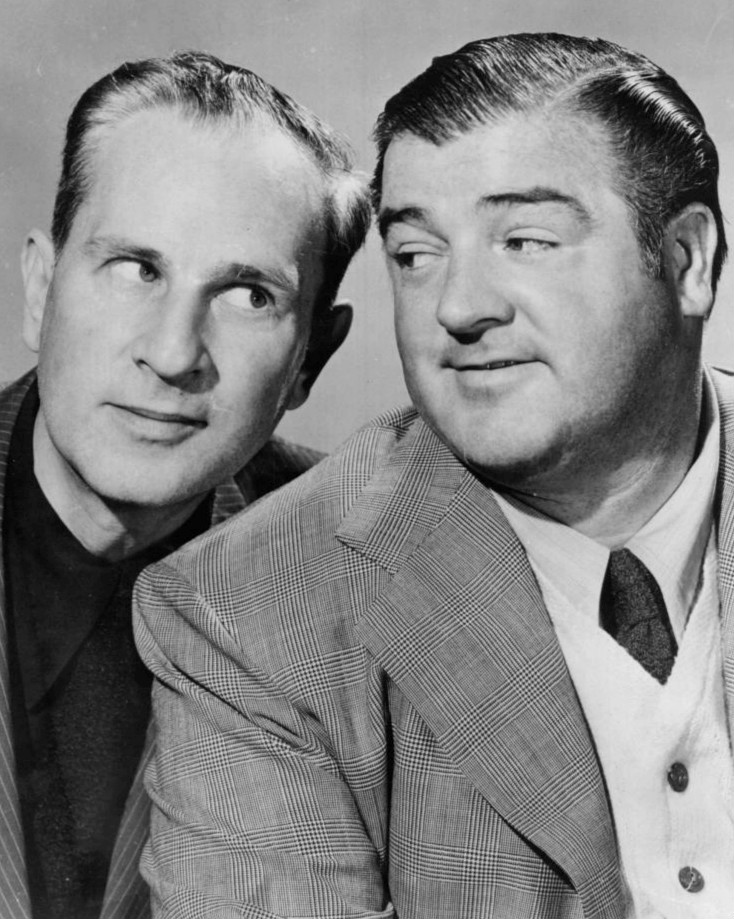
Bud Abbott and Lou Costello

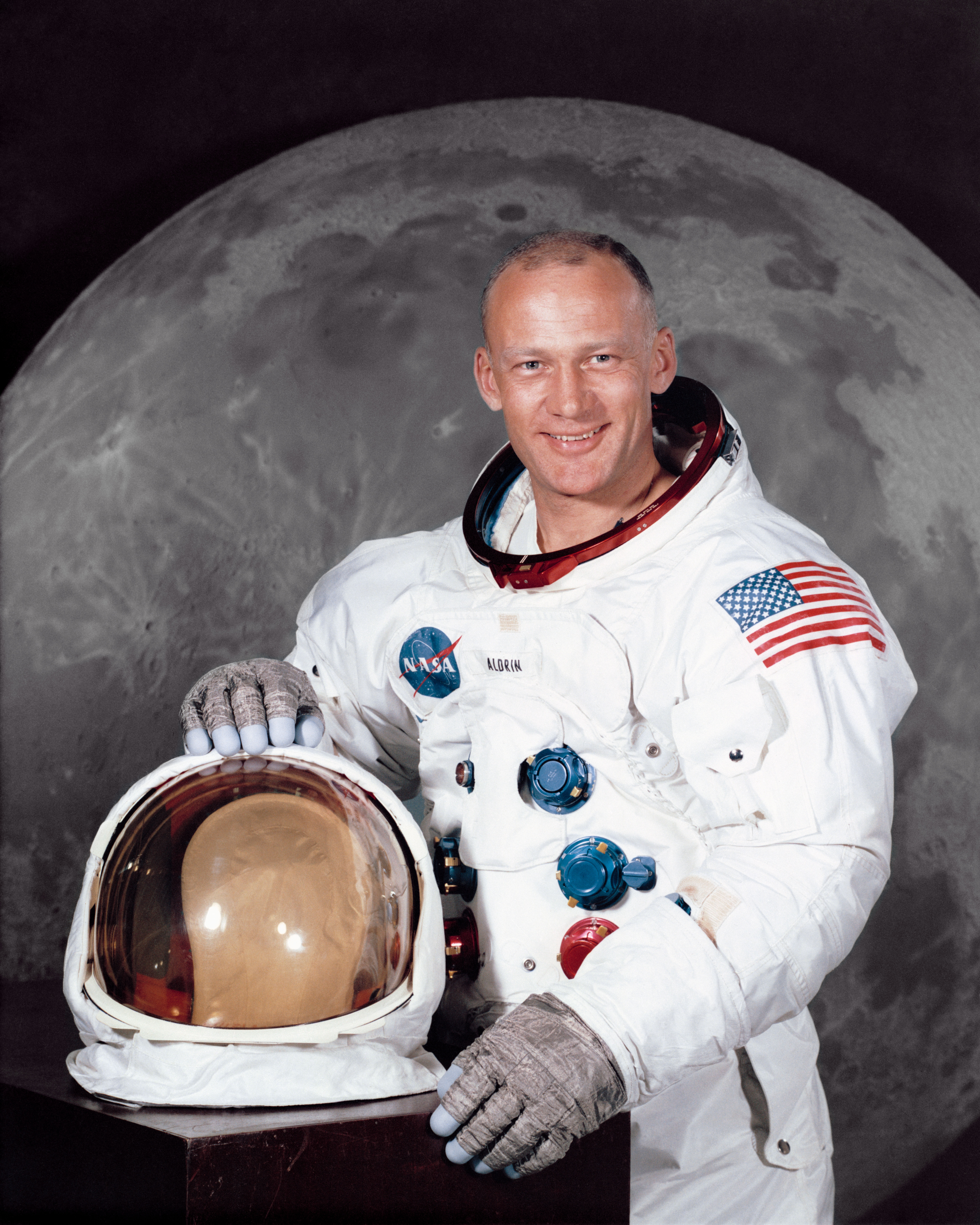
Buzz Aldrin

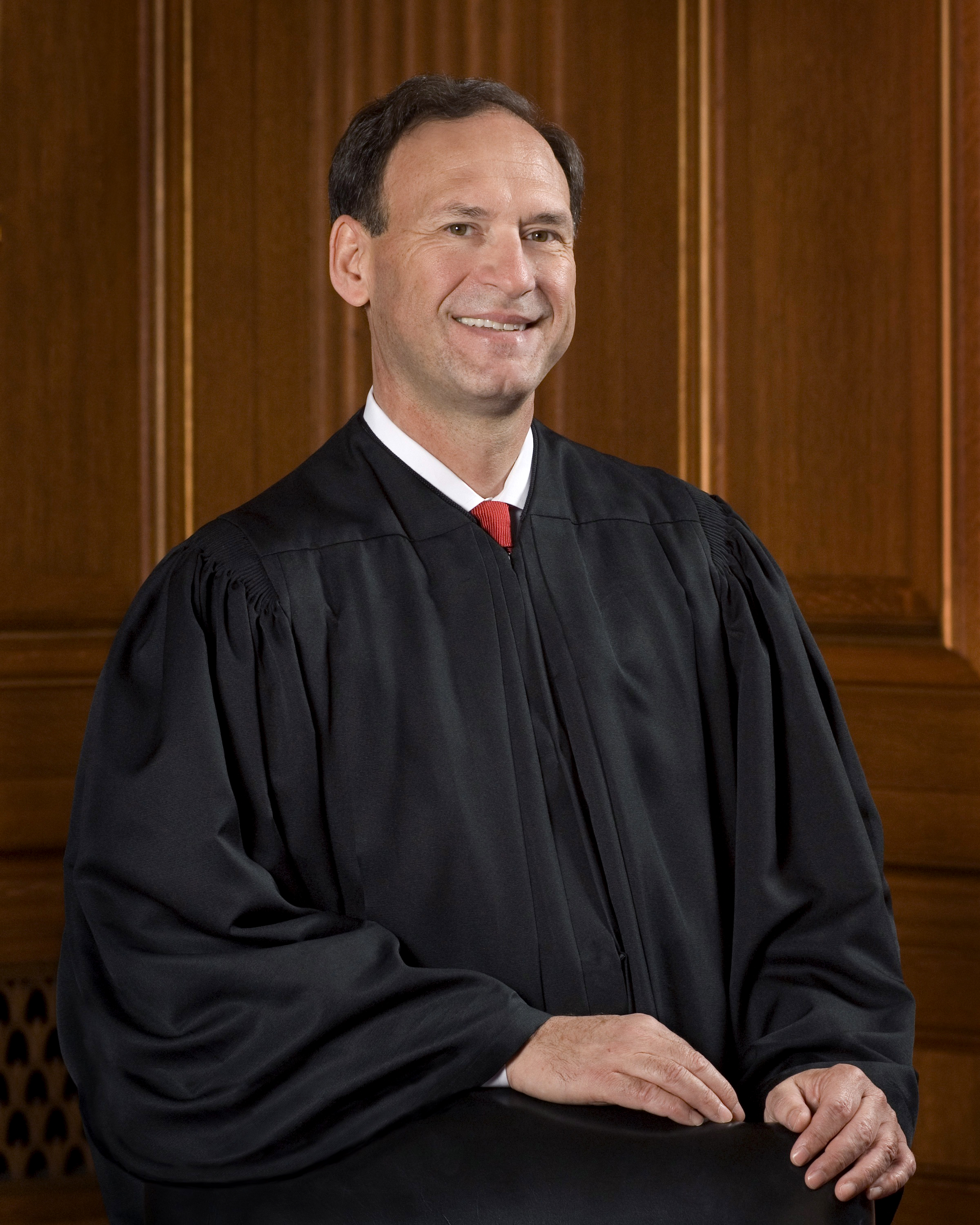
Samuel Alito

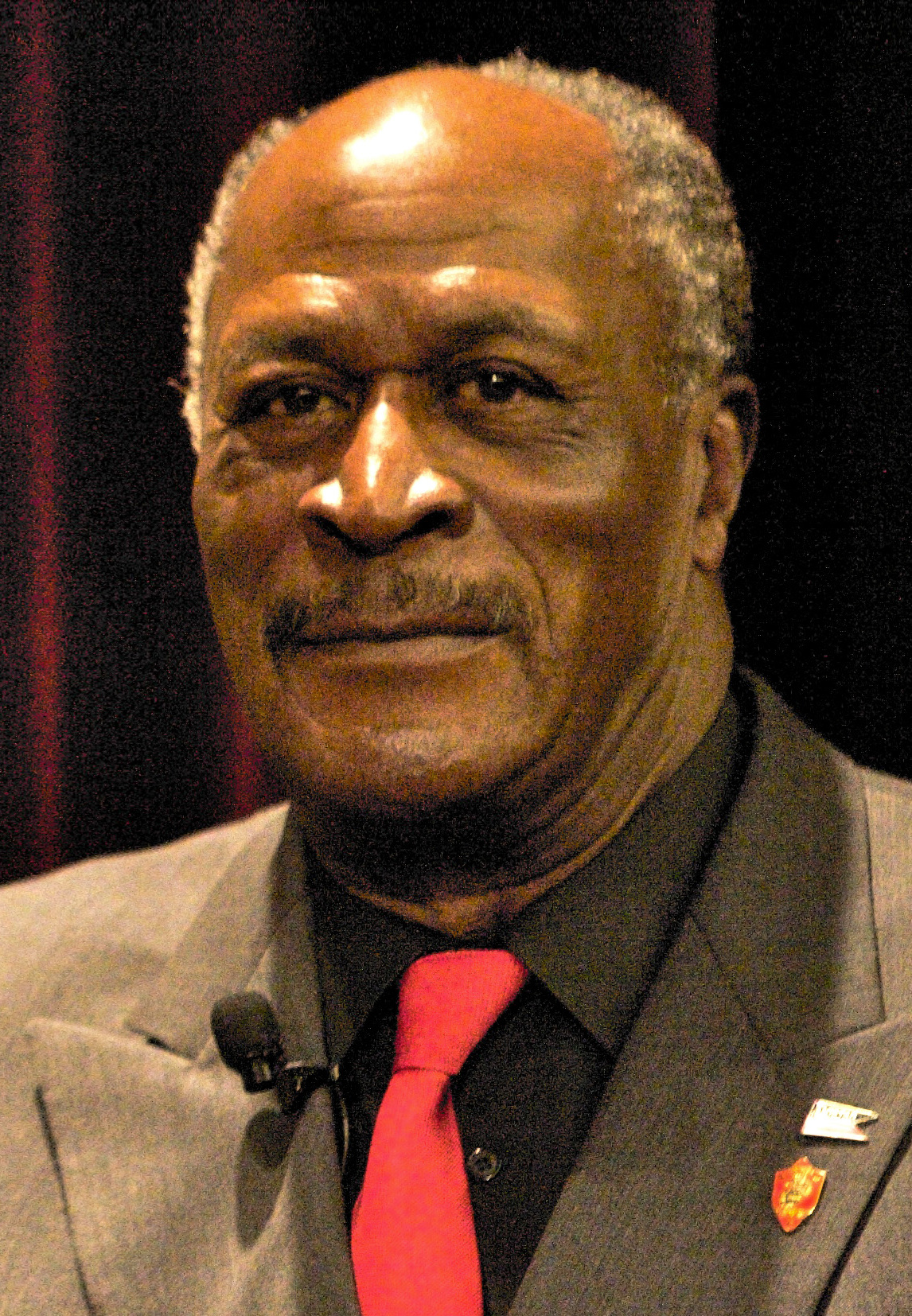
John Amos

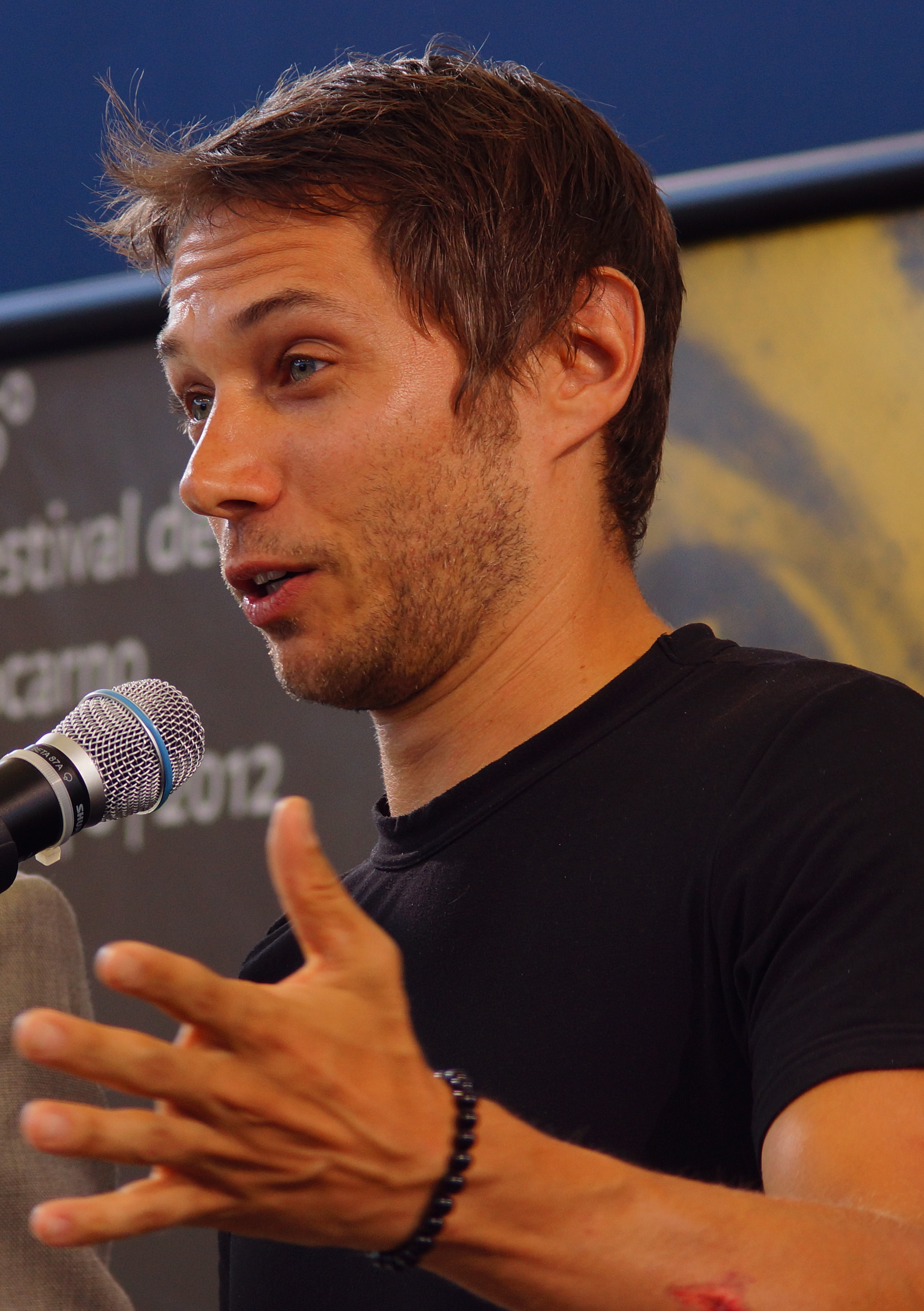
Sean Baker

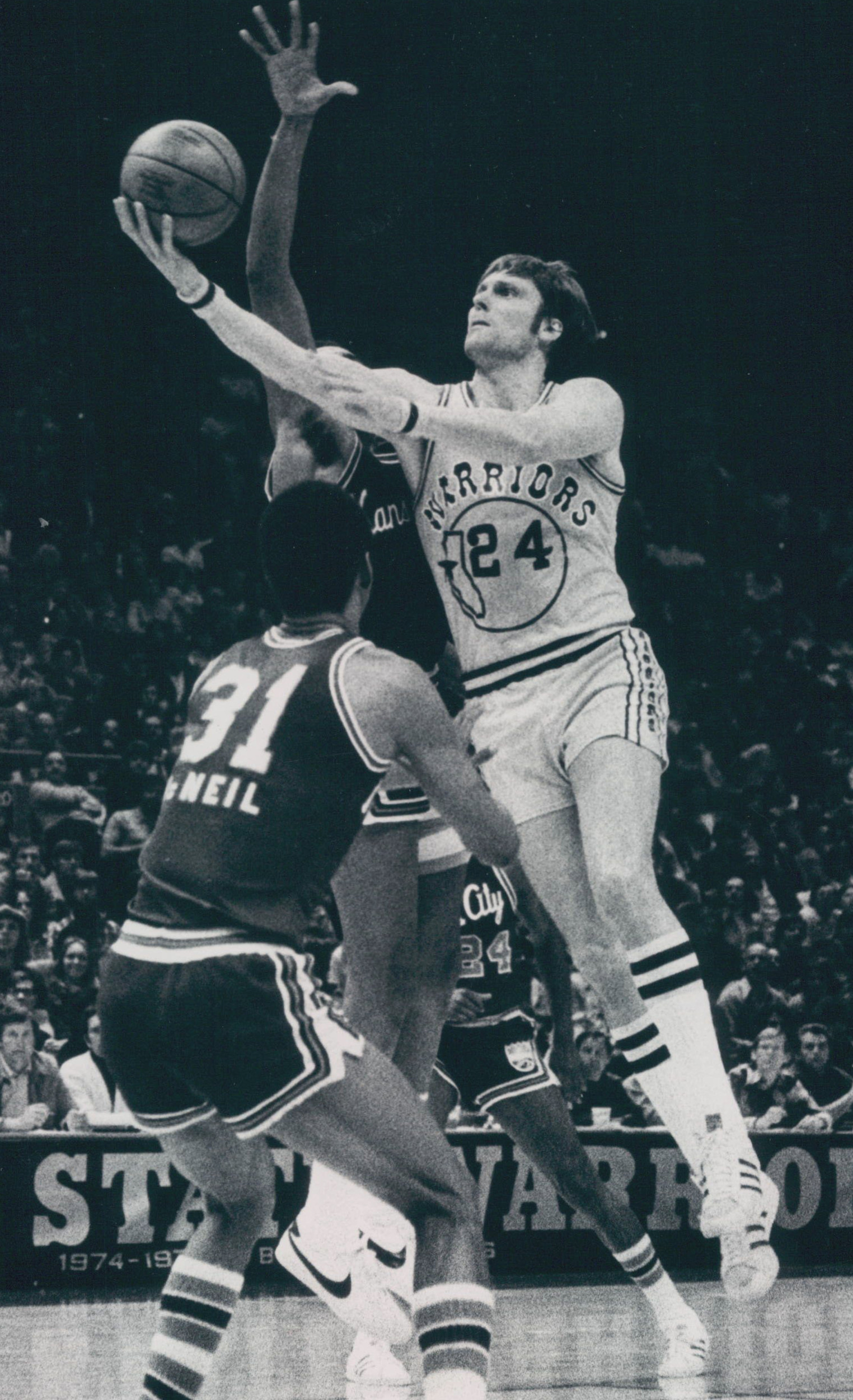
Rick Barry

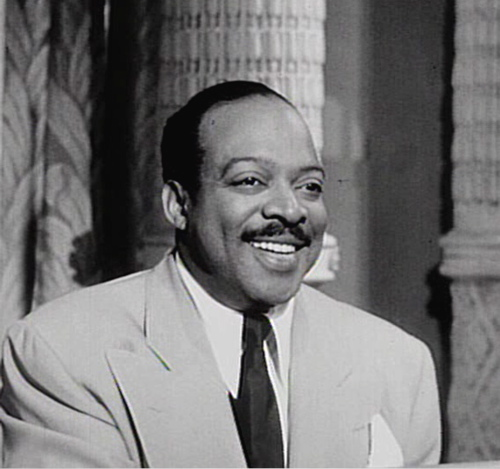
Count Basie

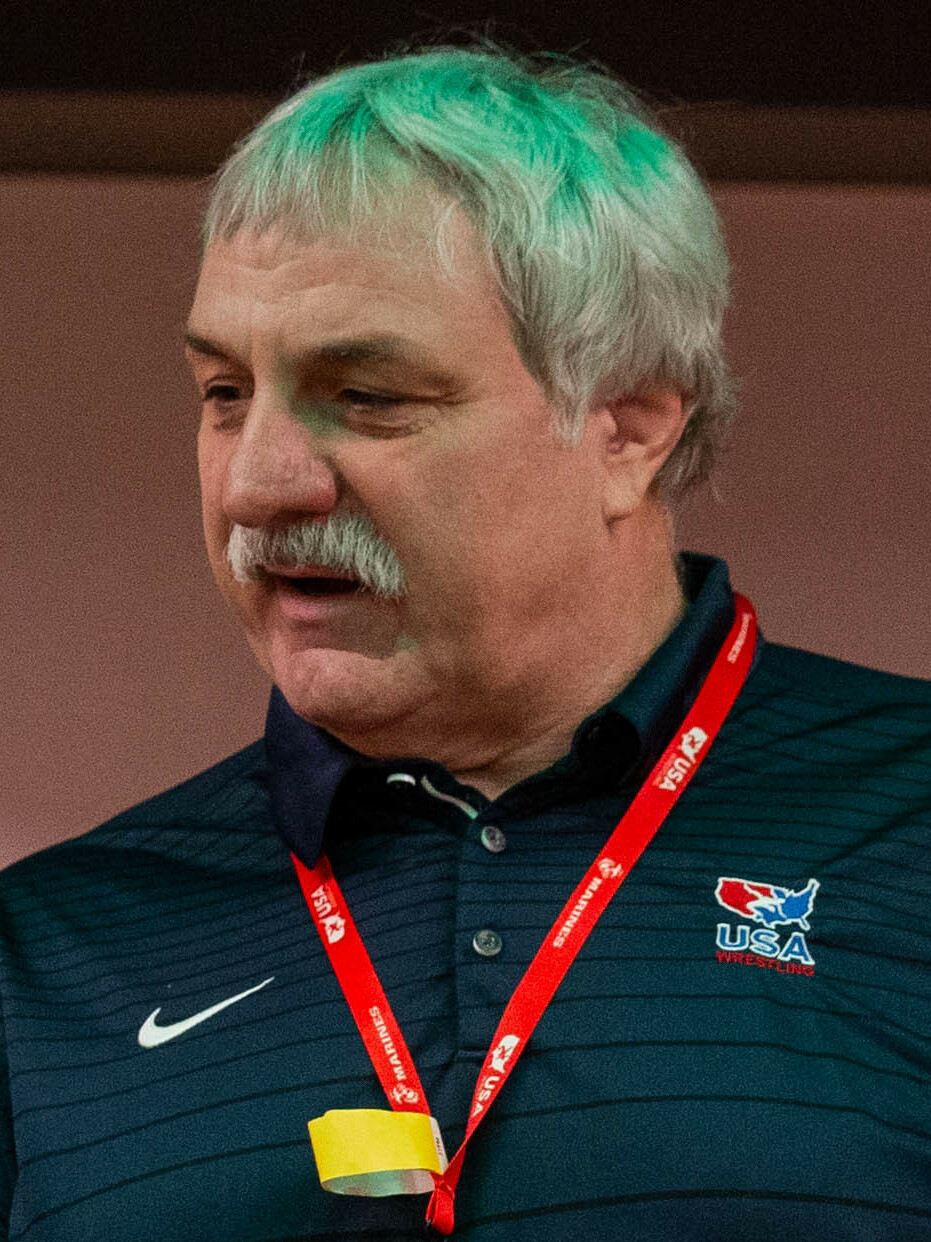
Bruce Baumgartner

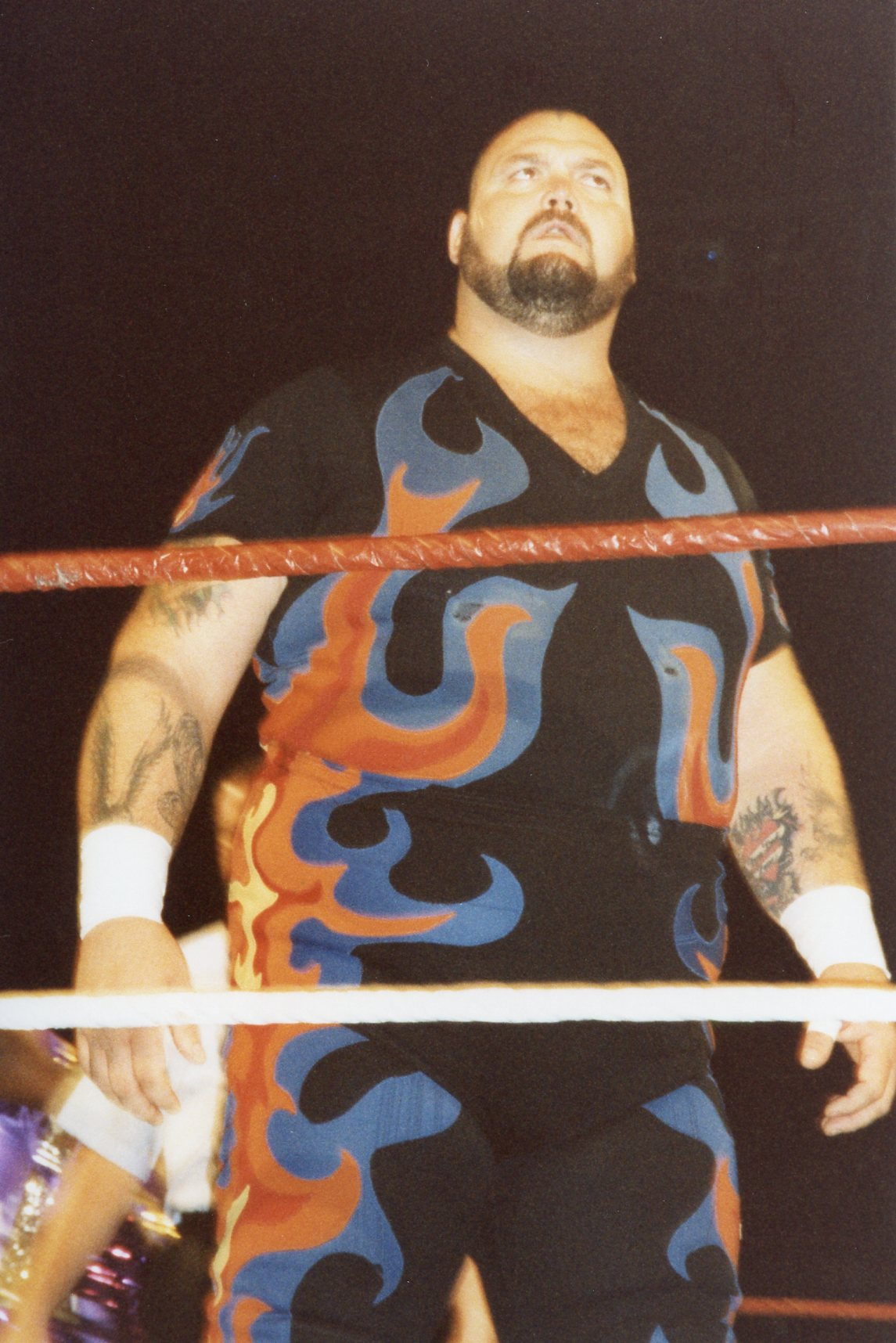
Bam Bam Bigelow

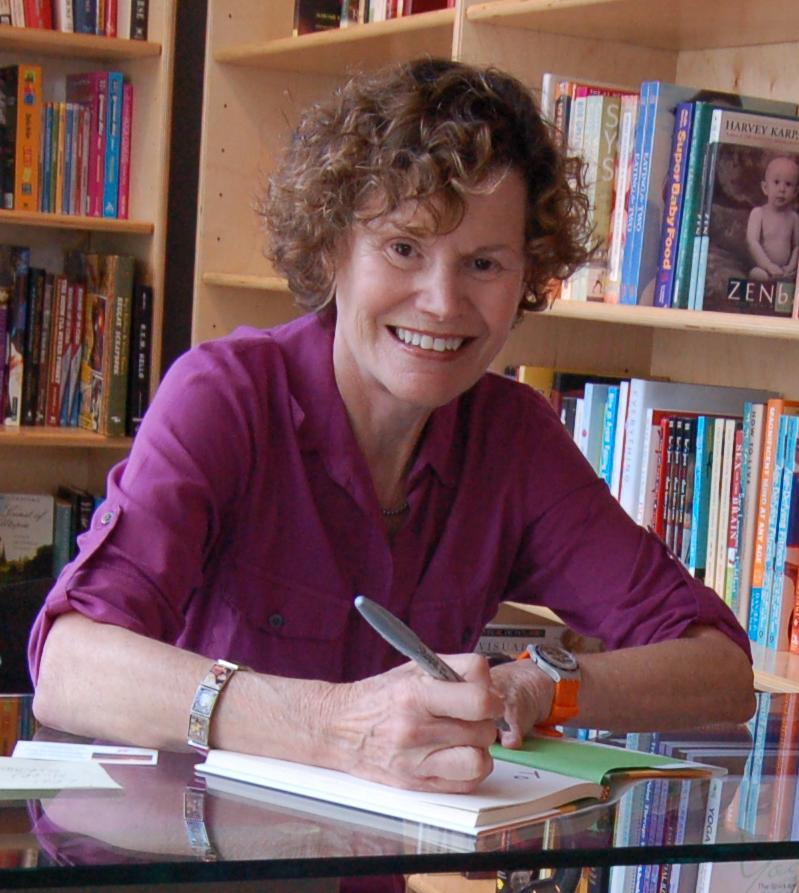
Judy Blume

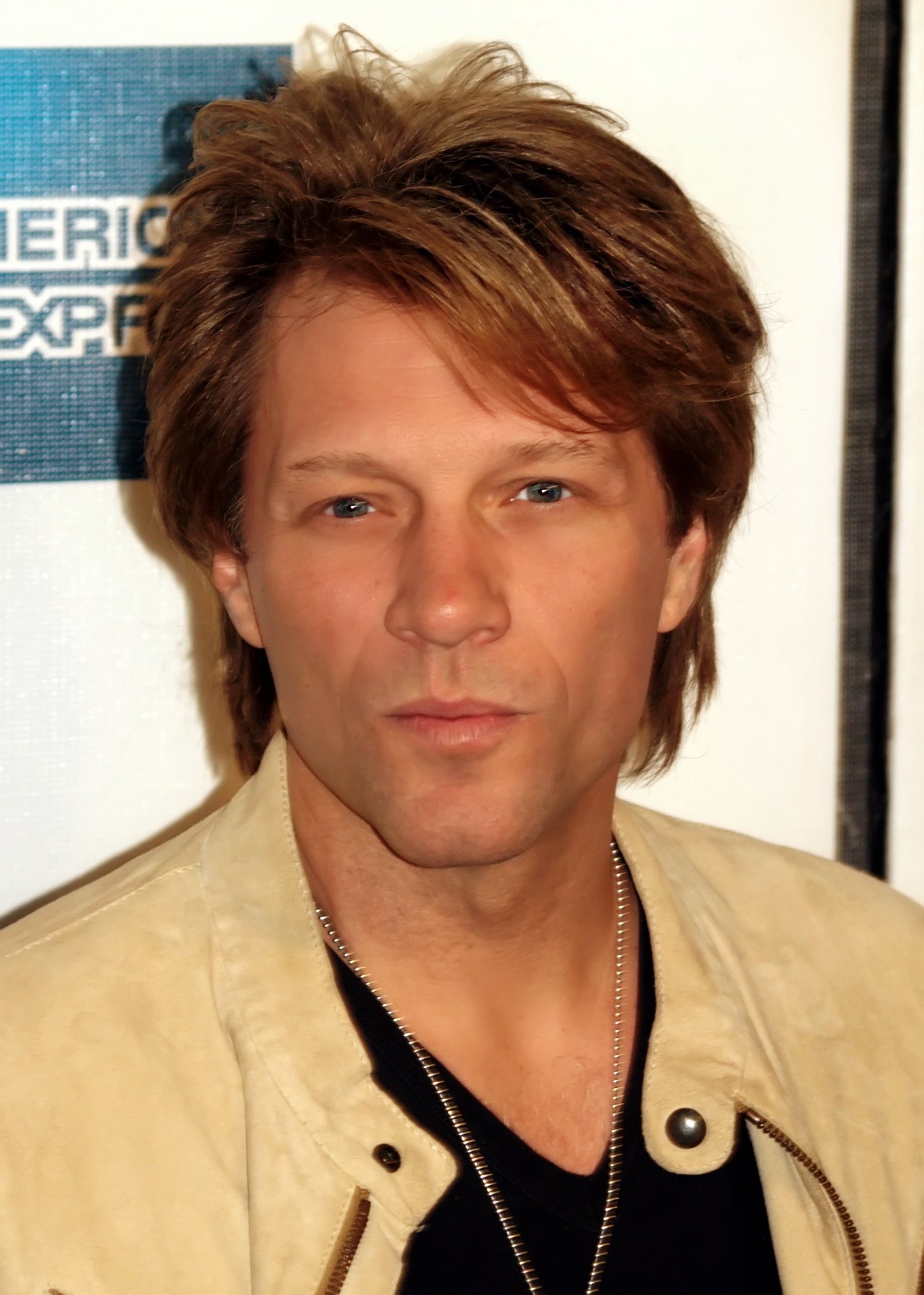
Jon Bon Jovi

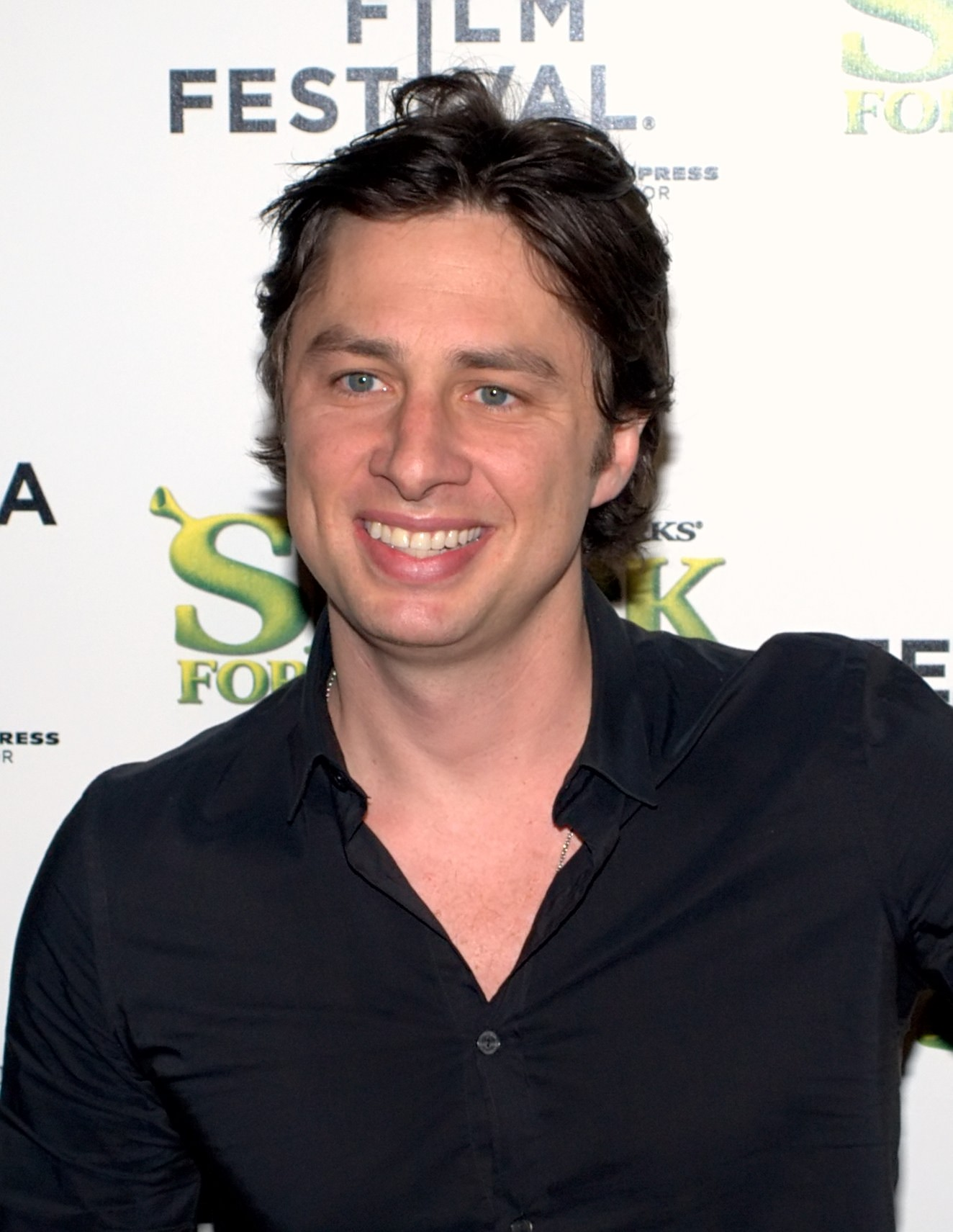
Zach Braff

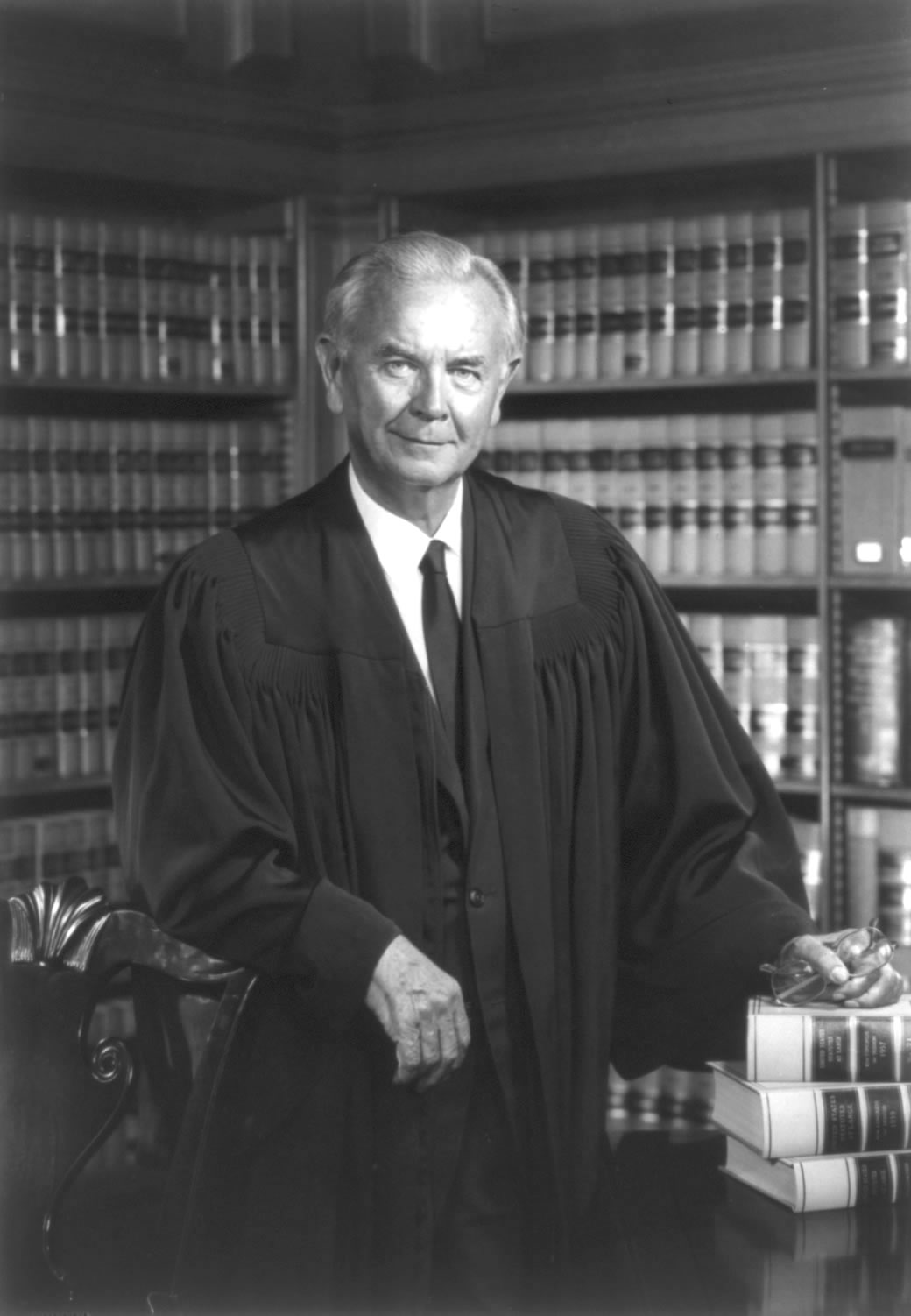
William Brennan Jr.

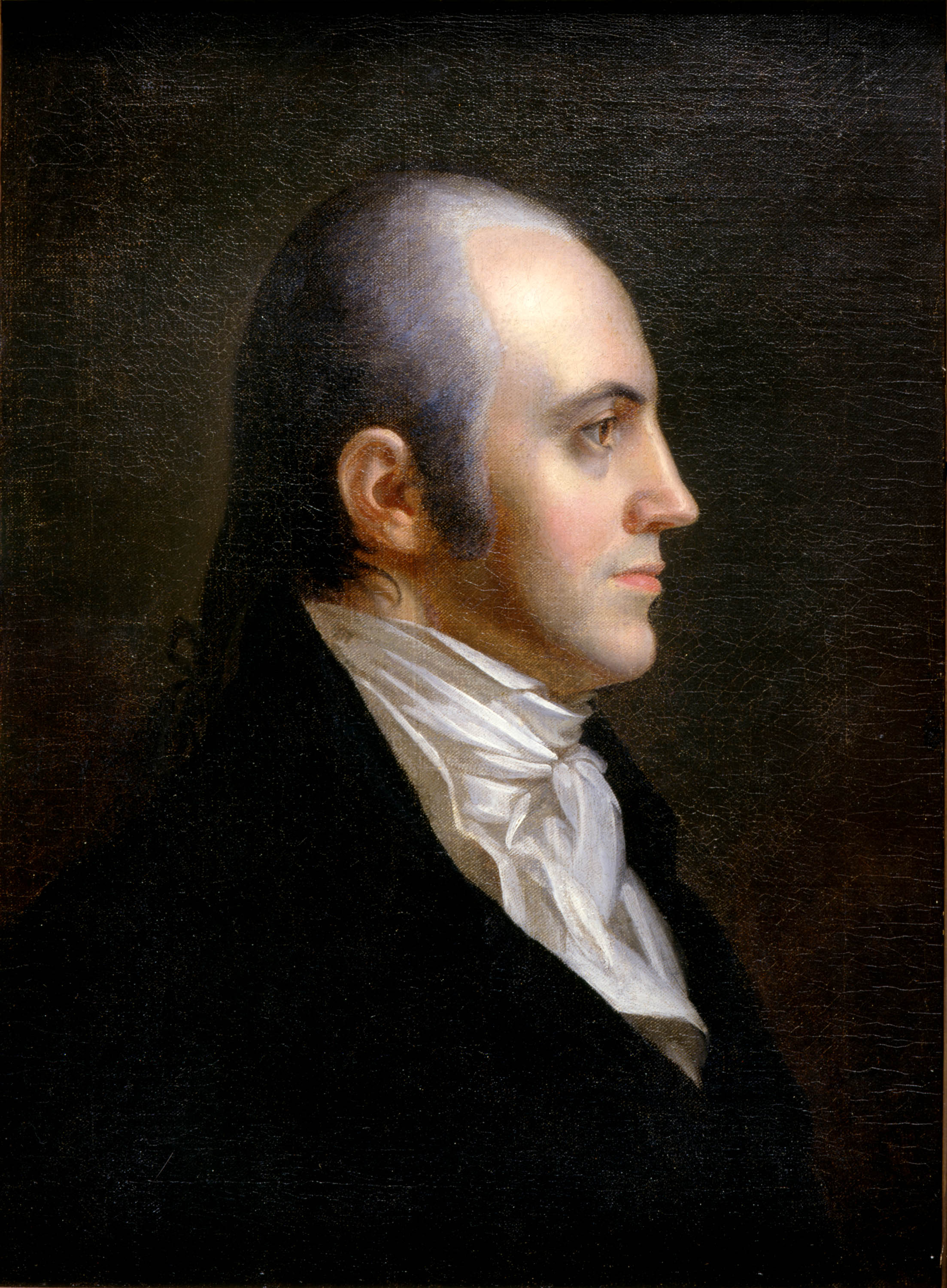
Aaron Burr

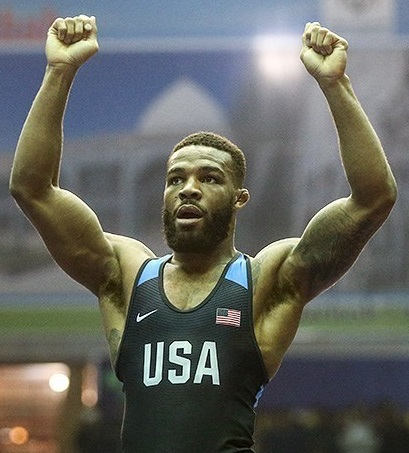
Jordan Burroughs

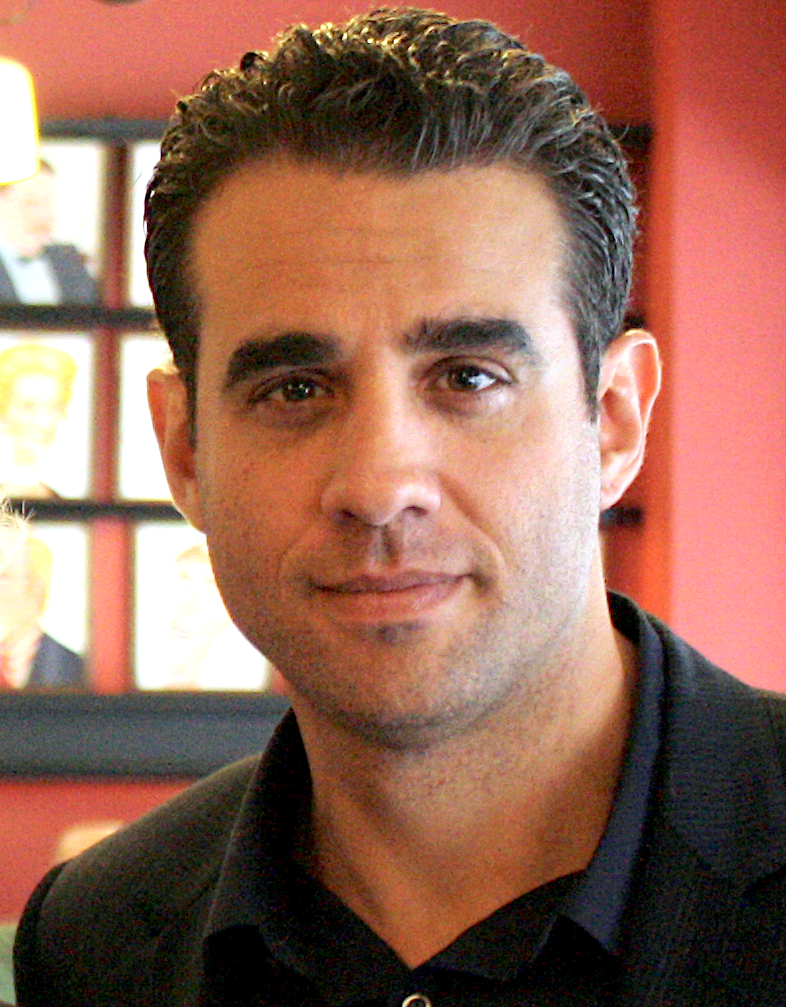
Bobby Cannavale

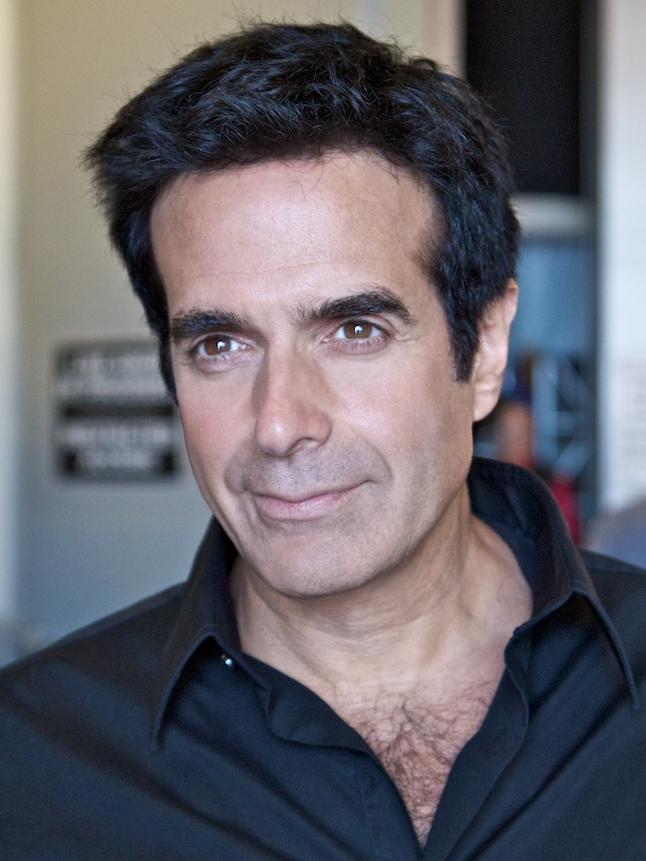
David Copperfield

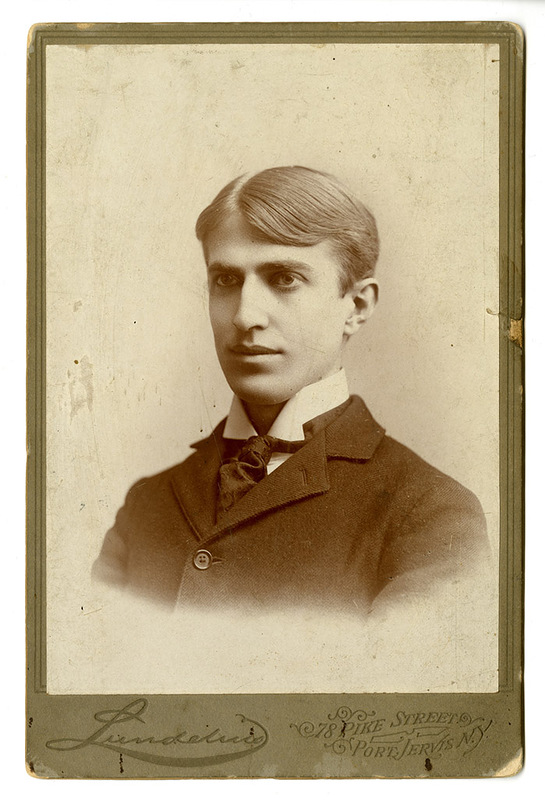
Stephen Crane

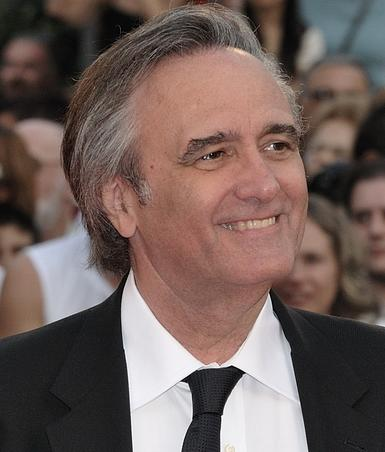
Joe Dante

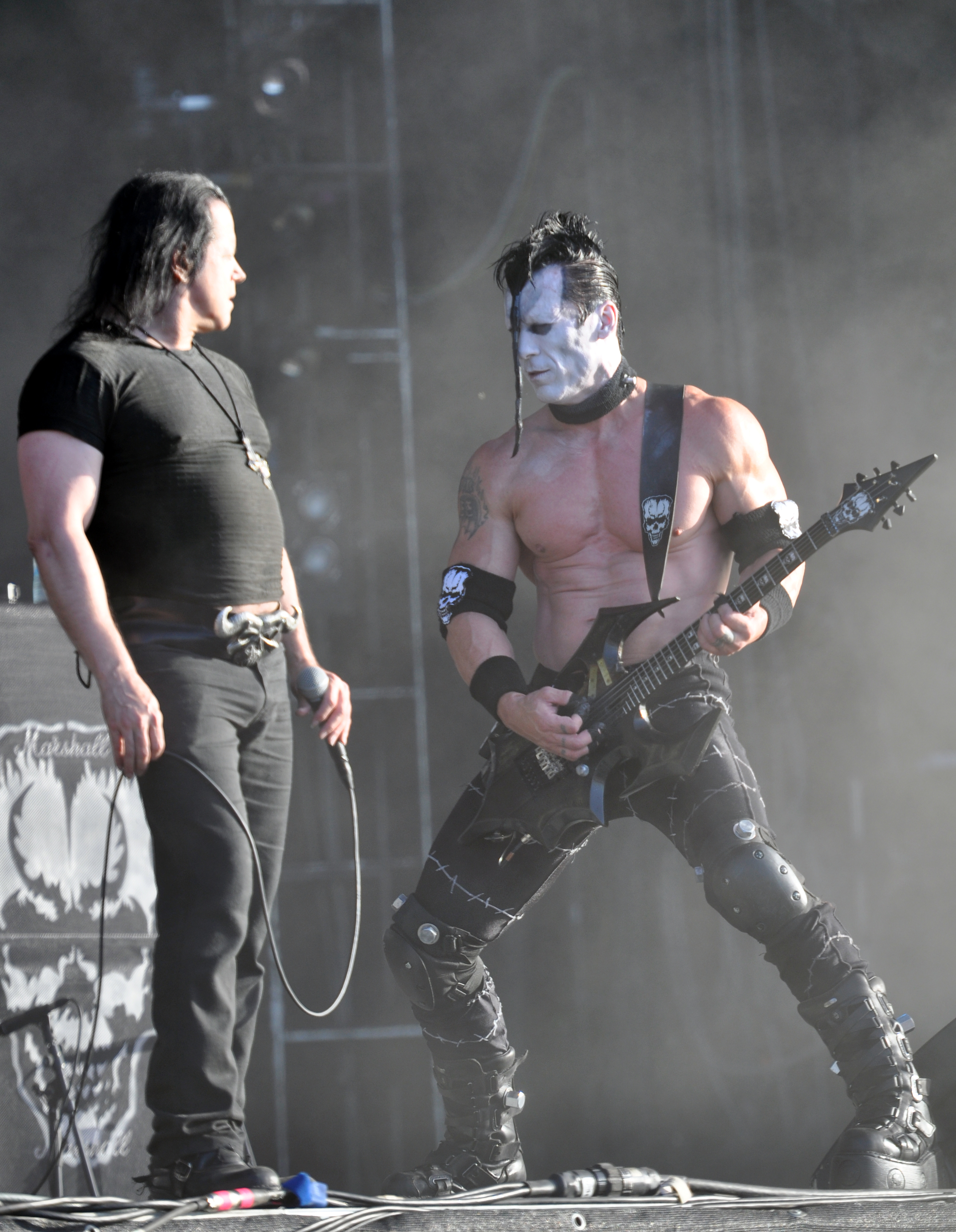
Glenn Danzig and Doyle Wolfgang von Frankenstein

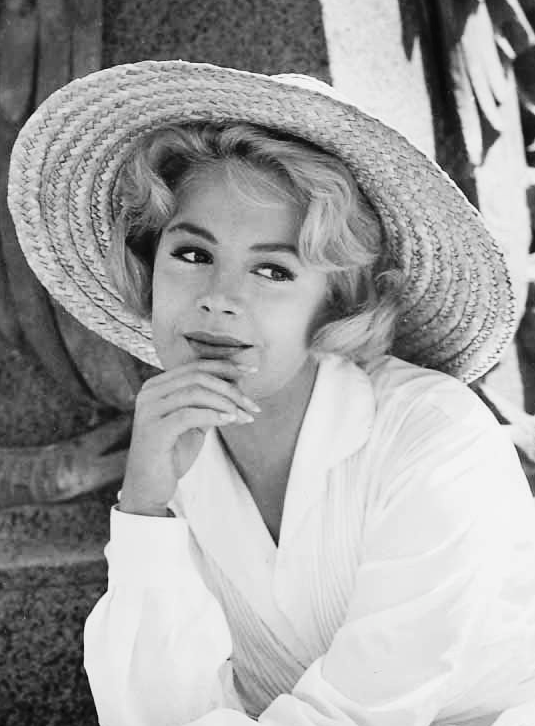
Sandra Dee

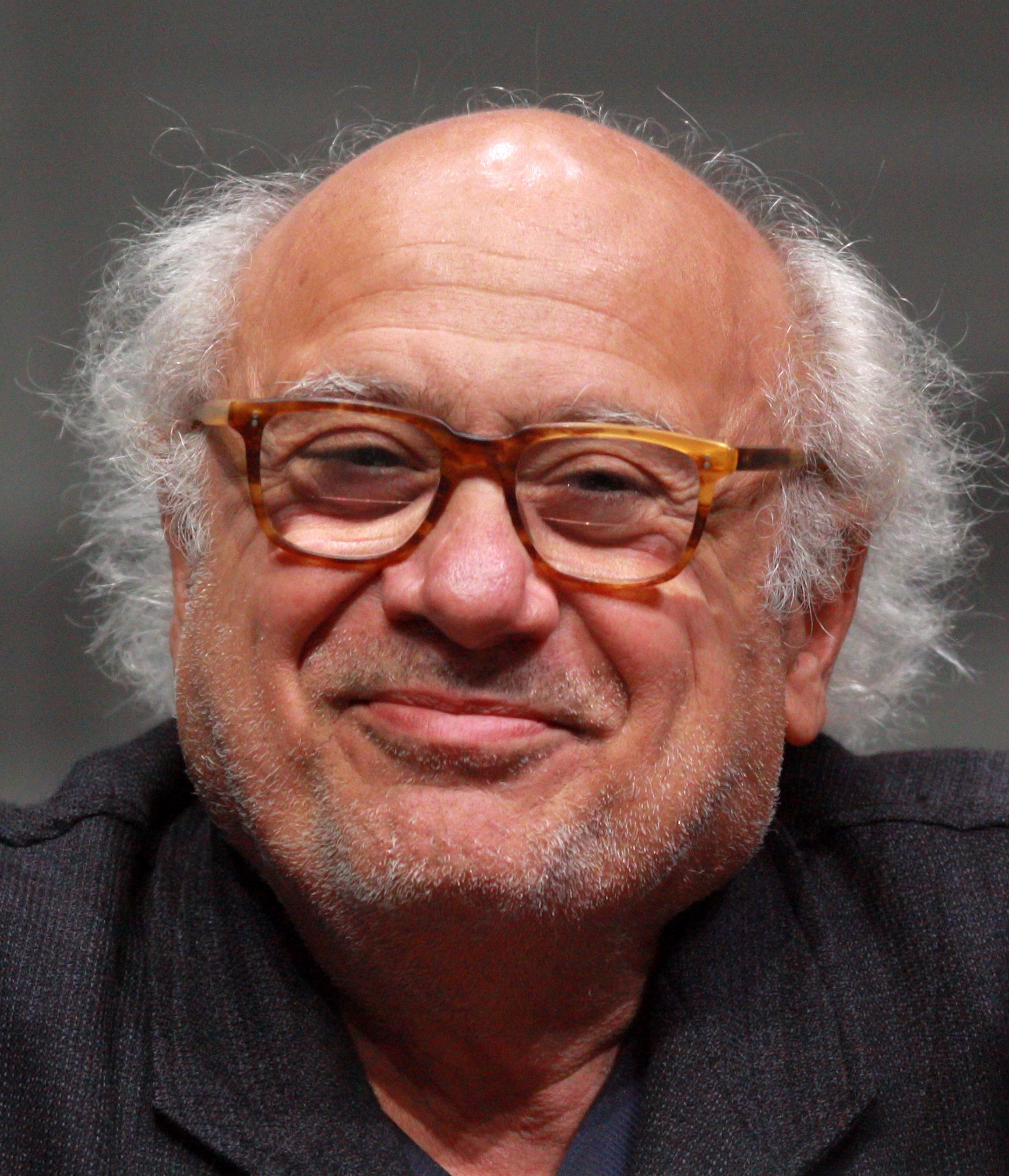
Danny DeVito

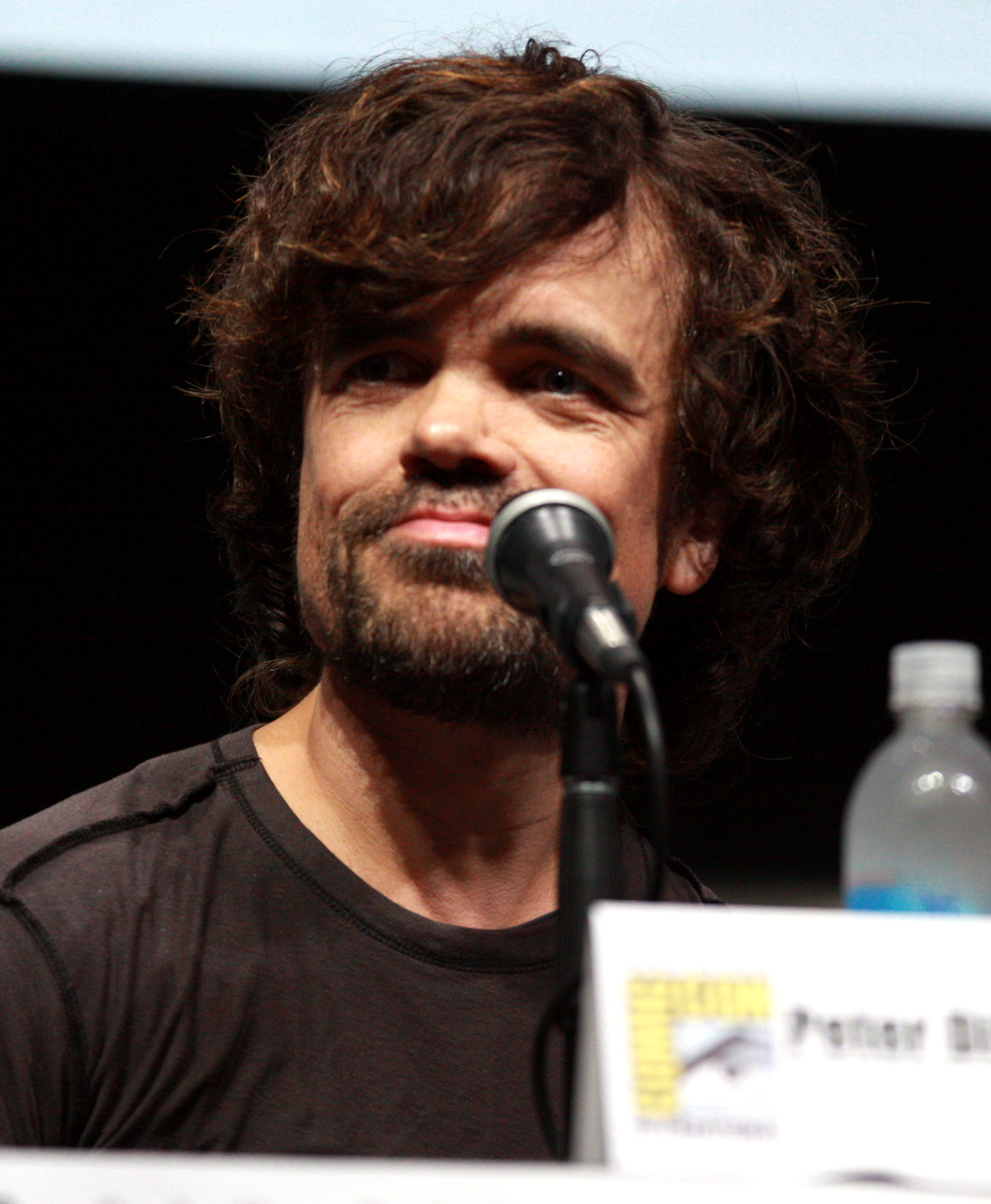
Peter Dinklage

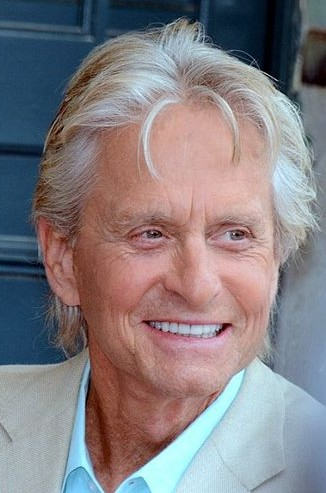
Michael Douglas

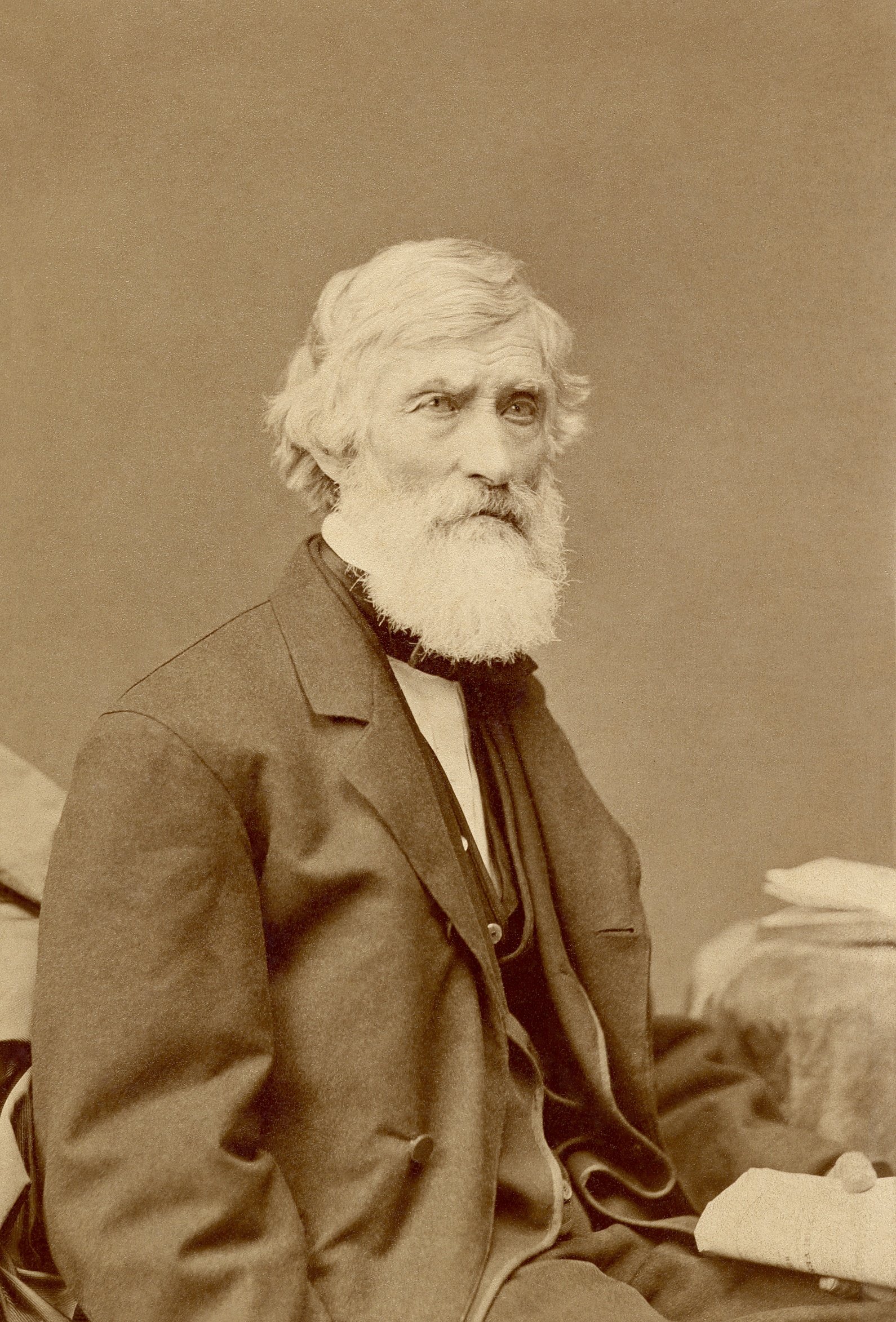
Asher Brown Durand

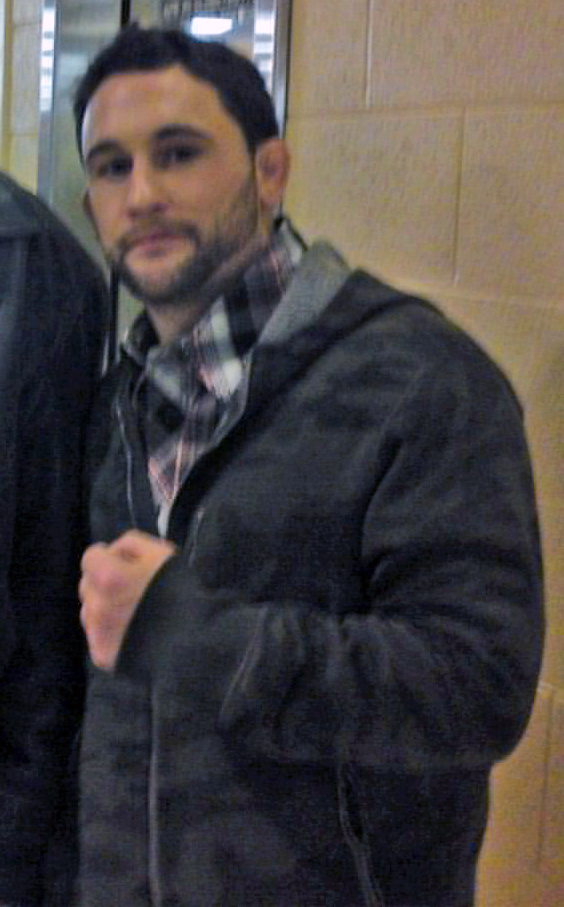
Frankie Edgar

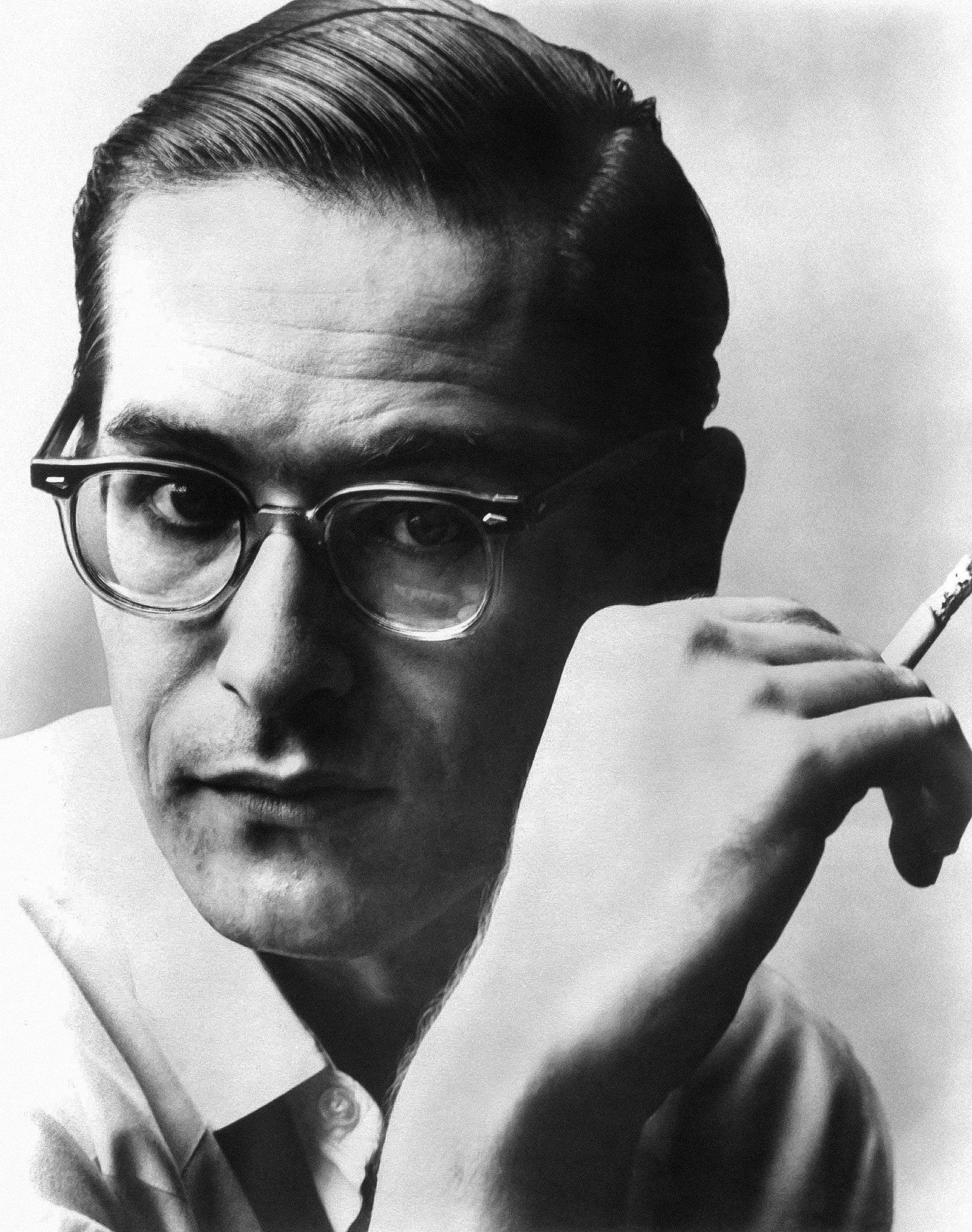
Bill Evans

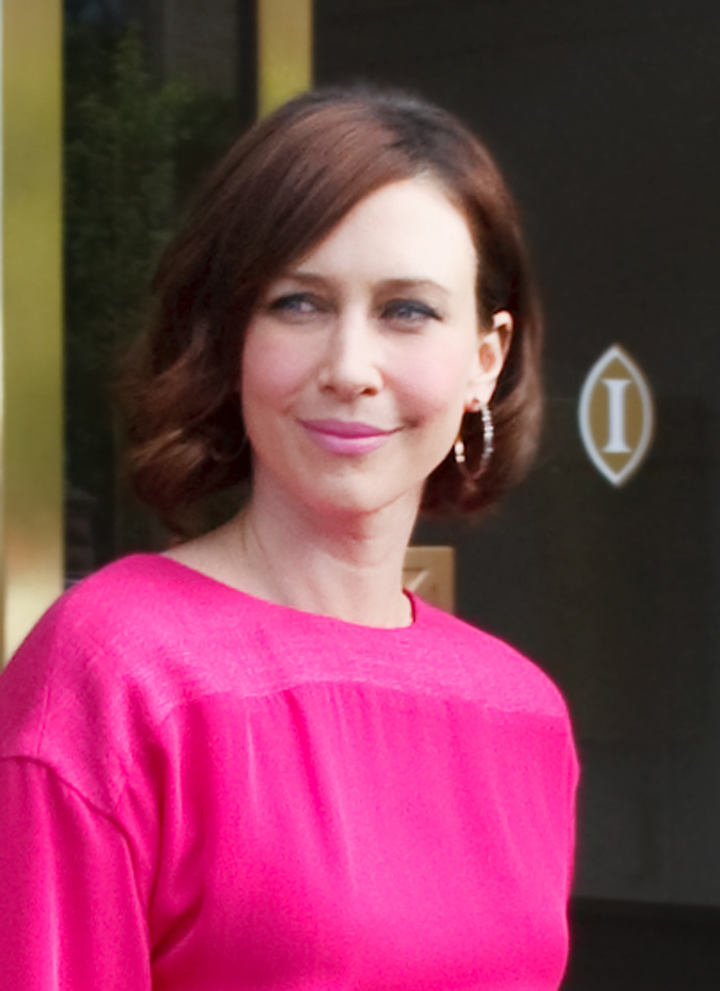
Vera Farmiga

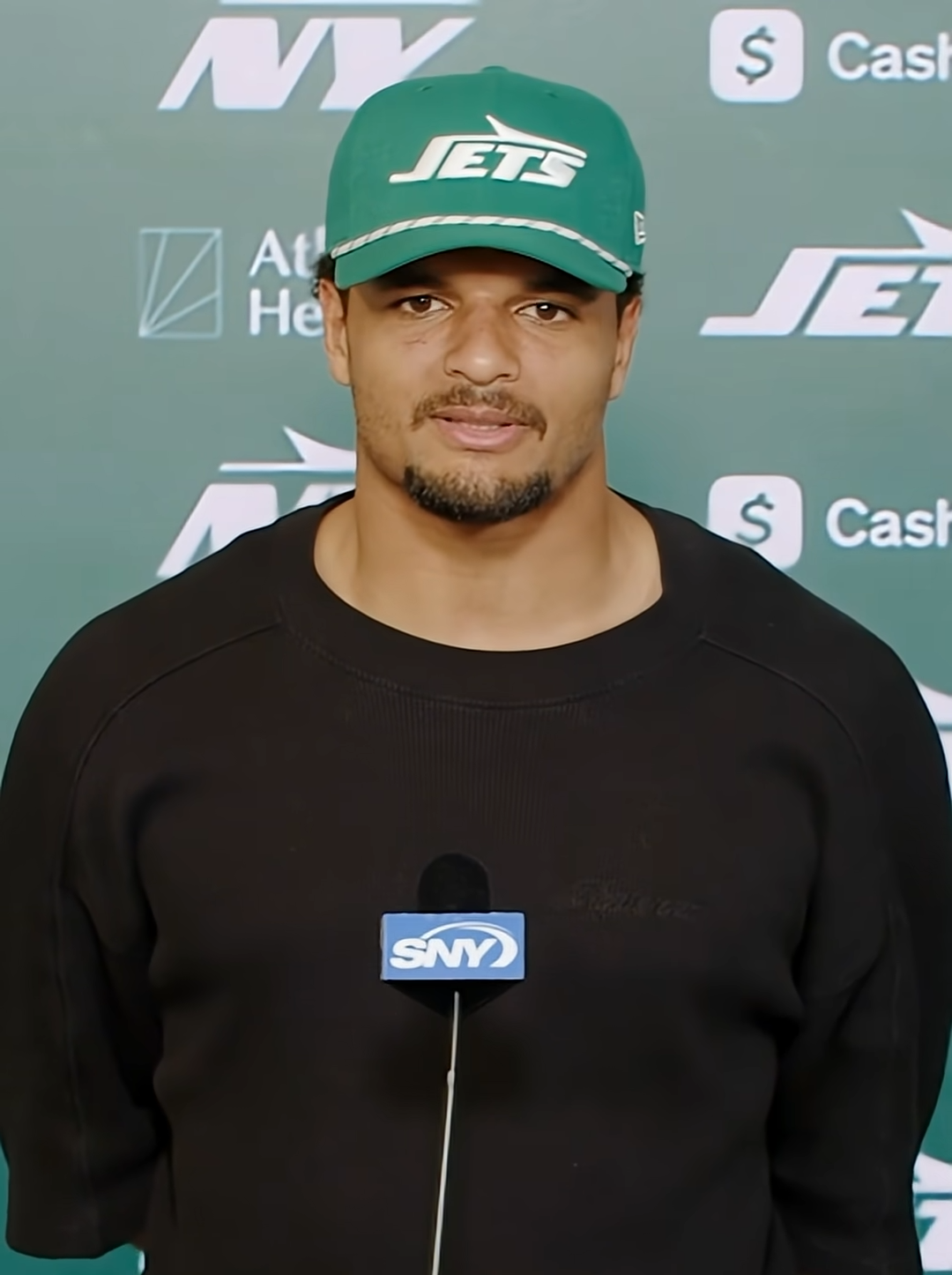
Minkah Fitzpatrick

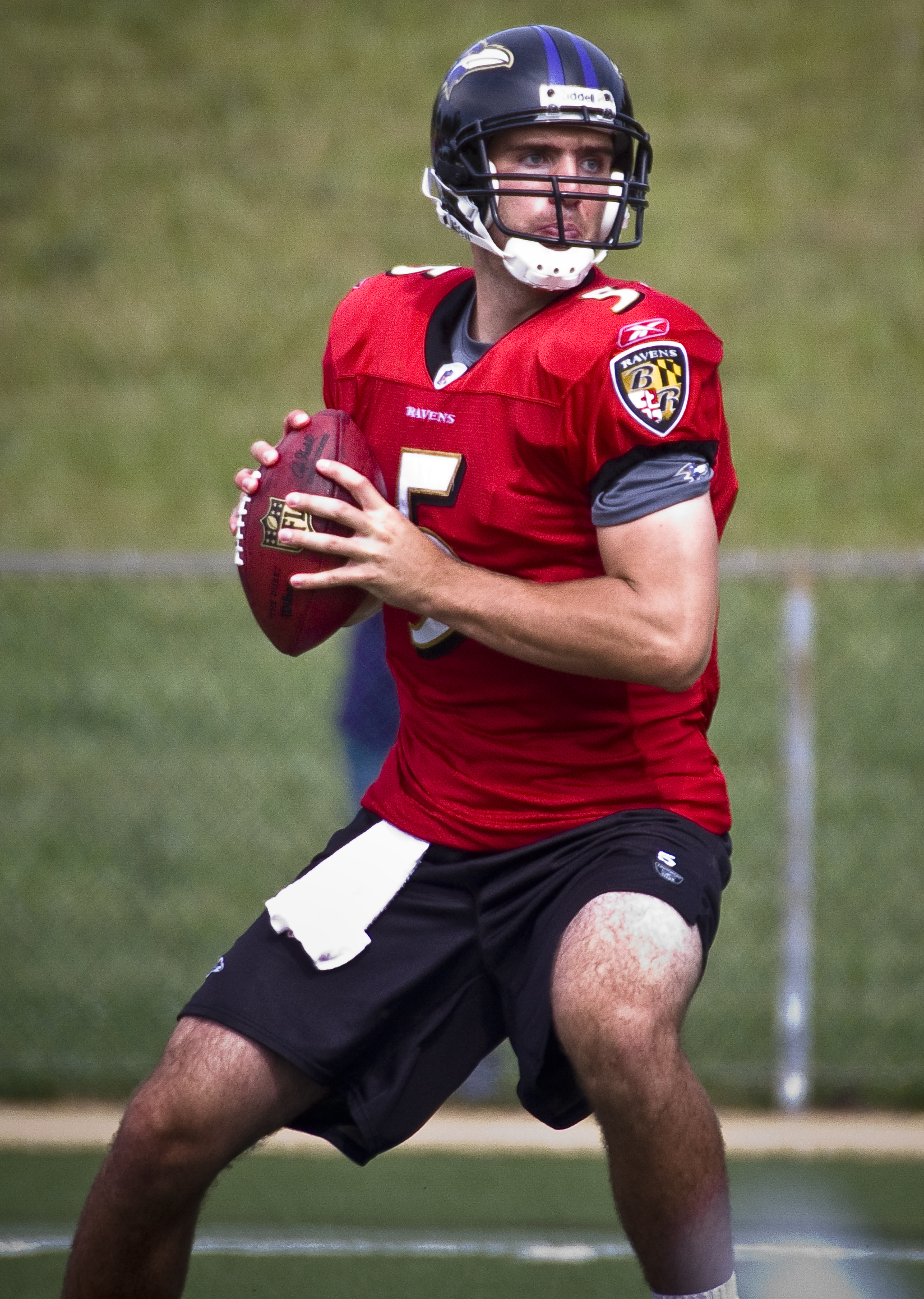
Joe Flacco

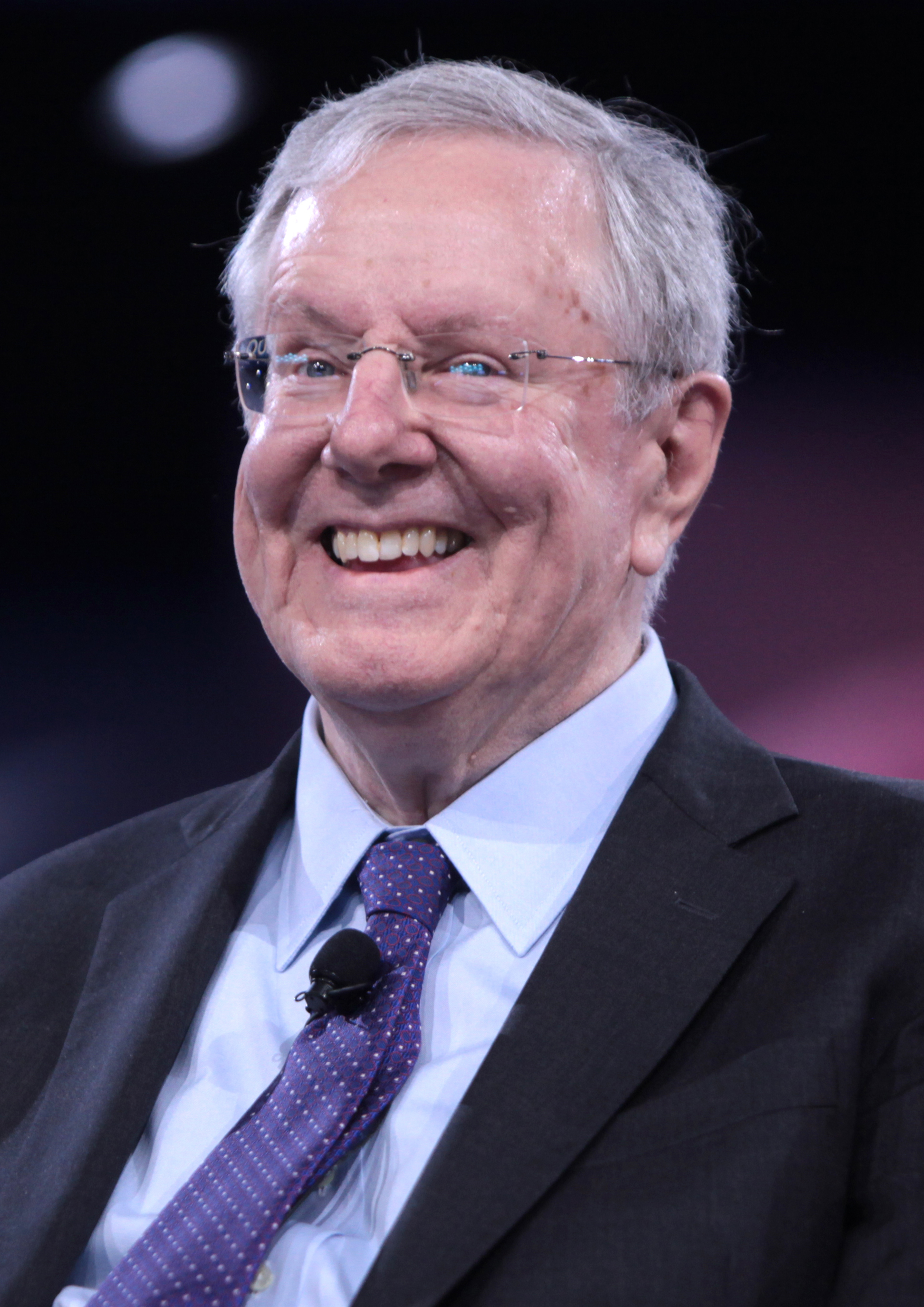
Steve Forbes

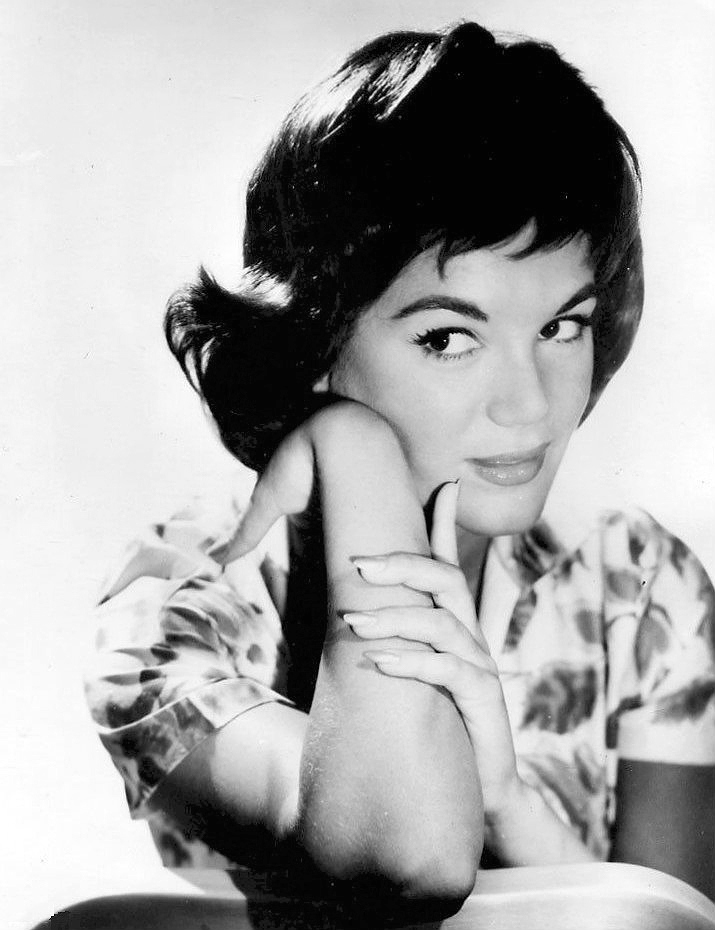
Connie Francis

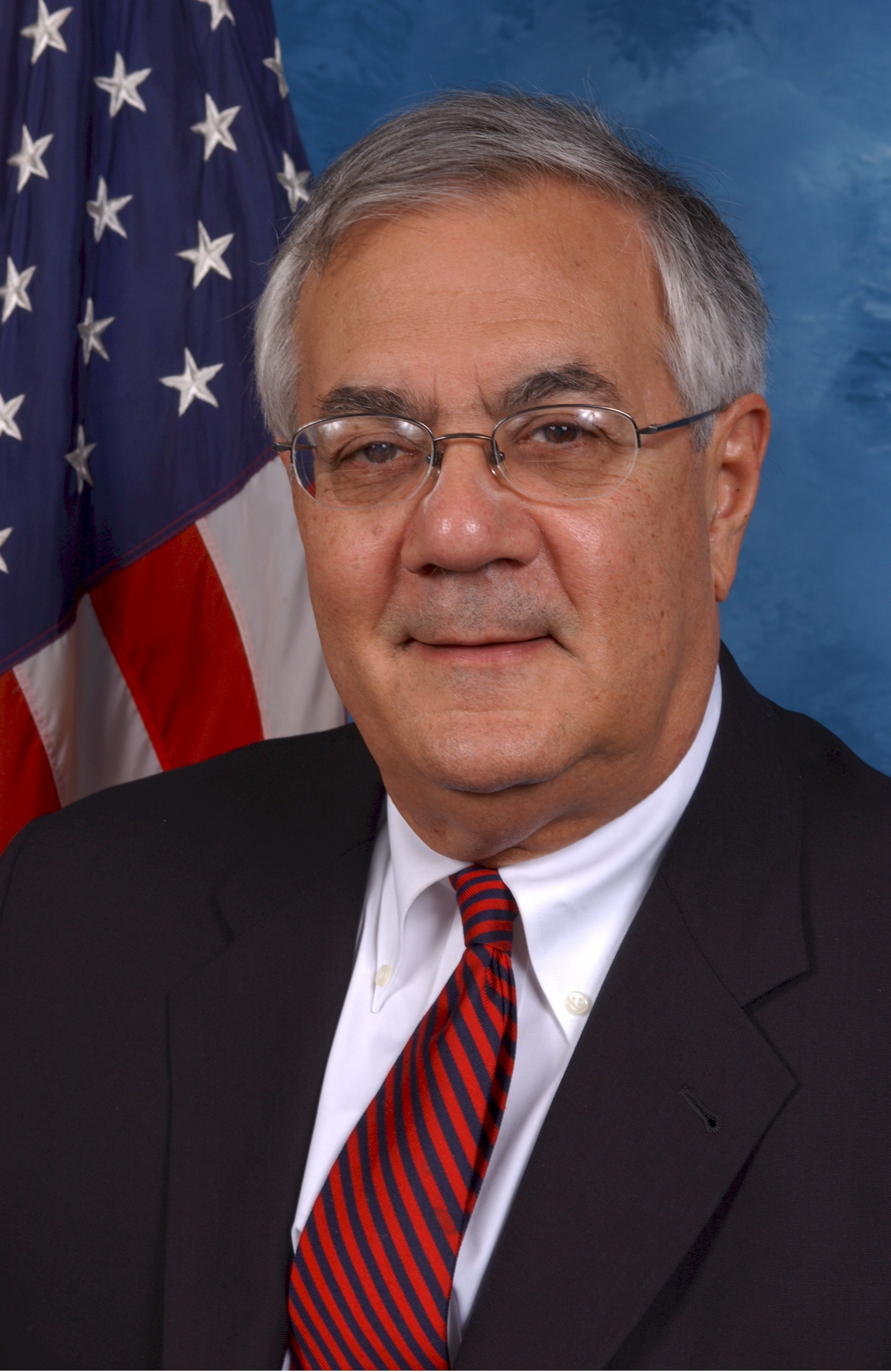
Barney Frank

- Brenden Aaronson (born 2000), soccer player for Leeds United and the United States men's team (Medford)
- Bud Abbott (1895–1974), actor and comedian, part of Abbott and Costello (Asbury Park)
- Isa Abdul-Quddus (born 1988), safety for the Detroit Lions (Union)
- Joseph Alexander Adams (1803–1880), engraver (New Germantown)
- Mike Adams (born 1981), safety for the Houston Texans (Paterson)
- Timothy Adams (born 1967), actor, Sunset Beach, Ocean Ave (Belleville)
- Charles Addams (1912–1988), cartoonist, creator of The Addams Family (Westfield)
- Ryan Adeleye (born 1985), soccer player for Hapoel Ashkelon (Elizabeth)
- Charlie Adler (born 1956), voice actor, Starscream in the Transformers film series (Paterson)
- Howard H. Aiken (1900–1973), physicist, computer scientist, developer of Harvard Mark I (Hoboken)
- Jordan Alan (born 1967), filmmaker, Terminal Bliss, Kiss & Tell, The Gentleman Bandit (Bayonne)
- Mitch Albom (born 1958), writer, journalist, humanitarian, author of Tuesdays with Morrie (Passaic)
- Buzz Aldrin (born 1930), NASA astronaut, second man to walk on the Moon (Glen Ridge, raised in Montclair)
- Jason Alexander (born 1959), actor, George Costanza on Seinfeld, Hugo in The Hunchback of Notre Dame (Newark, raised in Livingston)
- Jay Alford (born 1983), defensive tackle for the New York Giants (Orange)
- Samuel Alito (born 1950), associate justice, U.S. Supreme Court (Trenton)
- Malik Allen (born 1978), basketball player, assistant coach for the Miami Heat (Willingboro)
- Emma B. Alrich (1845–1925), journalist, writer, educator, charter member of Woman's Relief Corps (Cape May County)
- Enzo Amore (born 1986), professional wrestler (Hackensack, raised in Waldwick)
- Harold Amos (1919–2003), microbiologist, professor at Harvard Medical School (Pennsauken)
- John Amos (1939–2024), actor, The Fresh Prince of Bel-Air, Good Times, The West Wing (Newark)
- Richard Anderson (1926–2017), actor, The Six Million Dollar Man, Kung Fu, The Bionic Woman (Long Branch)
- Jack Antonoff (born 1984), musician, guitarist for Fun (Bergenfield)
- Kristina Apgar (born 1985), actress, Privileged (Morristown)
- Virginia Apgar (1909–1974), physician, inventor of the Apgar score (Westfield)
- Billy Ard (born 1959), football player for the New York Giants, Green Bay Packers (East Orange, raised in Watchung)
- Chris Argyris (1923–2013), business theorist, professor at Harvard (Newark)
- Bruce Arians (born 1952), head coach for the Arizona Cardinals (Paterson)
- Allan Arkush (born 1948), film and television director, Heroes, Rock 'n' Roll High School, Crossing Jordan (Jersey City)
- Jillian Armenante (born 1968), actress, Judging Amy (Paterson)
- Rich Attonito (born 1977), mixed martial artist (Elizabeth)
- Paul Auster (1947–2024), author, screenwriter (Newark, raised in South Orange)
- Miles Austin (born 1984), wide receiver for the Philadelphia Eagles (Summit, raised in Garfield)
- Jackie Autry (born 1941), MLB executive (Newark)
- Dan Avidan (born 1979), singer, musician and television host, Ninja Sex Party, Starbomb, Game Grumps (Springfield)
- Robert Ayers (born 1985), defensive end for the New York Giants (Jersey City)
- Melissa Bacelar (born 1979), actress and scream queen (Piscataway)
- Bret Baier (born 1970), television presenter, Special Report with Bret Baier (Rumson)
- Andrew Bailey (born 1984), relief pitcher for the Los Angeles Angels (Haddon Heights)
- David Bailey (1933–2004), actor, Another World (Voorhees)
- Sean Baker (born 1971), filmmaker, Tangerine, The Florida Project (Summit)
- Esther E. Baldwin (1840–1910), missionary, teacher, writer (Marlton)
- Wade Baldwin IV (born 1996), basketball player for Maccabi Tel Aviv of the Israeli Basketball Premier League.
- Amiri Baraka (1934–2014), poet (Newark)
- Michael Barkann (born 1960), radio talk show host, television host (East Brunswick)
- James J. Barry Jr. (born 1946), politician (Orange, raised in New Vernon)
- Rick Barry (born 1944), NBA and ABA small forward and Hall of Fame inductee (Elizabeth, raised in Roselle Park)
- James Barton (1890–1962), Vaudville actor (Gloucester City)
- Danny Basavich (born 1978), professional pool player (Manalapan)
- Dana Bash (born 1971), CNN reporter and anchorwoman (Montvale)
- Count Basie (1904–1984), jazz pianist, organist, bandleader (Red Bank)
- Ellen Bass (born 1947), professor, poet, and author (raised in Pleasantville and Ventnor City)
- Bruce Baumgartner (born 1961), freestyle wrestler, two-time Olympic champion, four-time Olympic medalist, three-time World champion, nine-time World medalist (Haledon)
- Beetlejuice, a.k.a. Lester Green (born 1968), entertainer, guest on The Howard Stern Show (Jersey City)
- Bo Belinsky (1936–2001), MLB player
- Amir Bell (born 1996), basketball player in the Israel Basketball Premier League
- Emma Bell (born 1986), actress (Woodstown)
- Madeline Bell (born 1942), soul singer (Newark)
- Bill Bellamy (born 1965), actor, comedian (Newark)
- Regina Belle (born 1963), singer (Englewood)
- Stephen Benkovic (born 1938), chemist, National Academy of Sciences inductee (Orange)
- Joan Bennett (1910–1990), actress (Palisades Park)
- Kafi Benz (born 1941), writer and conservationist (Chatham)
- Jay Berger (born 1966), tennis player; highest world ranking #7
- Xander Berkeley (born 1955), actor (Mendham)
- Adam Bernstein (born 1960), video director and producer (Princeton)
- Alessandra Biaggi (born 1986), New York state senator
- Mike Bibby (born 1978), NBA player (Cherry Hill)
- Jack Bicknell Jr. (born 1963), offensive line coach for the Kansas City Chiefs (North Plainfield)
- Bam Bam Bigelow (1961–2007), professional wrestler (Asbury Park)
- Jason Biggs (born 1978), actor, American Pie, American Pie 2, American Wedding, American Reunion (Hasbrouck Heights)
- Mary Birdsong (born 1968), actress, comedian Reno 911! (Long Beach Island)
- Roger Birnbaum (born 1950), film producer, Four Christmases, 27 Dresses, Eight Below, Mr. 3000, Six Days Seven Nights (Teaneck)
- Sofia Black-D'Elia (born 1991), actress, All My Children, Skins, The Messengers (Clifton)
- Vivian Blaine (1921–1995), actress and singer, Guys and Dolls (Newark)
- Betsy Blair (1923–2009), actress, Marty (Cliffside Park)
- Tammy Blanchard (born 1976), actress (Bayonne)
- Carol Blazejowski (born 1956), Hall of Fame basketball player (Elizabeth)
- Al Blozis (1919–1945), New York Giants tackle, died as a soldier in combat during World War II (Garfield)
- Mark Blum (1950–2020), actor (Newark)
- Judy Blume (born 1938), author (Elizabeth)
- Peter Boettke (born 1960), economist of the Austrian School (Rahway)
- Tim Bogert (1944–2021), bass guitarist and vocalist for Vanilla Fudge, Cactus, and Beck, Bogert & Appice (Ridgefield)
- Rachel Bolan (born 1964), professional musician, most notably as the bass guitar player for the hard rock/heavy metal band kid Row (born in Point Pleasant and raised in Toms River)
- Clint Bolick (born 1957), attorney and prominent school choice advocate (Elizabeth)
- Jon Bon Jovi (born 1962), musician (Perth Amboy)
- Denise Borino (1964–2010), actress, Ginny Sacramoni on The Sopranos (Roseland)
- Joe Borowski (born 1971), former MLB pitcher, current sportscaster for the Arizona Diamondbacks (Bayonne)
- Philip Bosco (1930–2018), actor (Jersey City)
- Emma Bourne (1846–1924), president, New Jersey Woman's Christian Temperance Union
- Dennis Boutsikaris (born 1952), actor (Newark)
- Katrina Bowden (born 1988), actress, Cerie on 30 Rock (Wyckoff)
- Todd Bowles (born 1963), former head coach of the New York Jets (Elizabeth)
- Brad Brach (born 1986), relief pitcher for the Atlanta Braves (Freehold)
- Gary Brackett (born 1980), middle linebacker for the Indianapolis Colts (Glassboro)
- Zach Braff (born 1975), actor, Scrubs, Chicken Little (South Orange)
- Debbie Bramwell-Washington (born 1966), IFBB professional bodybuilder
- John Brennan (born 1954), director of Central Intelligence Agency (North Bergen)
- William J. Brennan Jr. (1906–1997), U.S. Supreme Court justice (Newark)
- David Brewster (born 1939), publisher and journalist (Newark)
- Cameron Brink (born 2001), forward for the Los Angeles Sparks (Princeton)
- Ralph L. Brinster (born 1932), geneticist (Montclair, raised in Cedar Grove)
- Kenny Britt (born 1988), wide receiver for the New England Patriots (Bayonne)
- Tal Brody (born 1943), American-Israeli basketball player
- Betty Bronson (1906–1971), actress, Peter Pan (Trenton)
- Jacqueline Brookes (1930–2013), actress (Montclair)
- Dave Brown (born 1970), quarterback for the New York Giants and Arizona Cardinals (Summit)
- Donald Brown (born 1987), running back for the Indianapolis Colts (Atlantic Highlands)
- Ella Barksdale Brown (1871–1966), journalist, educator (Jersey City)
- Roscoe Lee Browne (1925–2007), actor, The Cowboys, The Mambo Kings (Woodbury)
- Lou Brutus (born 1972), radio host, musician, photographer (Newark, raised in Englistown)
- David Bryan (born 1962), musician (Perth Amboy)
- Mark Bryant (born 1965), NBA player, assistant coach (Glen Ridge, raised in South Orange)
- Herbert J. Buehler (1927–2007), educator and Democratic Party politician who represented coastal Monmouth County in the New Jersey Senate. (Bayonne)
- John D. Bulkeley (1911–1996), vice admiral in United States Navy, Medal of Honor recipient
- King Kong Bundy (1955–2019), professional wrestler, stand-up comedian, actor (Atlantic City)
- Jake Burbage (born 1992), actor Grounded for Life (Willingboro)
- Richard Burgi (born 1958), actor Desperate Housewives, The Sentinel (Montclair)
- Aaron Burr (1756–1836), third vice president of the United States (Newark)
- Jordan Burroughs (born 1988), freestyle wrestler, Olympic gold medalist, four-time World Champion (Sicklerville)
- Glen Burtnik (born 1955), musician (North Brunswick)
- Da'Sean Butler (born 1987), basketball player for Hapoel Be'er Sheva of the Israeli Premier League
- Nicholas Murray Butler (1862–1947), Nobel Prize-winning philosopher, diplomat, and educator (Elizabeth)
- Greg Buttle (born 1954), linebacker for the New York Jets (Atlantic City, raised in Linwood)
- Andrew Bynum (born 1987), center for the Philadelphia 76ers (Plainsboro)
- Brendan Byrne (1924–2018), governor of New Jersey (West Orange)
- P. J. Byrne (born 1974), actor, The Game (South Orange)
- Michael Cade (born 1972), actor, California Dreams (Elmwood Park)
- Joseph Caldwell (1773–1835), mathematician, first president of the University of North Carolina (Lamington)
- Alisyn Camerota (born 1969), news anchor for CNN (Shrewsbury)
- Alyssa Campanella (born 1990), Miss USA 2011, 1st runner-up Miss Teen USA 2007, model, blogger (New Brunswick)
- John W. Campbell (1910–1971), science fiction writer and editor, Analog Science Fiction and Fact (Newark)
- William Campbell (1923–2011), actor (Newark)
- Bobby Cannavale (born 1971), actor, Bobby Caffey on Third Watch (Union City)
- Philip Carey (1925–2009), actor, One Life to Live (Hackensack)
- Ron Carey (1935–2007), actor, Barney Miller (Newark)
- Julie Carmen (born 1954), actress (Millburn)
- Thomas Carpenter (1752–1847), a patriot of the American Revolutionary War; born in Salem, died in Carpenter's Landing
- Rosalind Cash (1938–1995), actress (Atlantic City)
- Jonathan Casillas (born 1987), linebacker for the New York Giants (New Brunswick)
- David Cassidy (1950–2017), actor/singer, star of the 1970s television show The Partridge Family (West Orange)
- Joanna Cassidy (born 1945), actress, Blade Runner, Who Framed Roger Rabbit, Six Feet Under (Haddonfield)
- Iván Castro (born 1967), U.S. Army captain serving on active duty in the Special Forces despite losing his eyesight (Hoboken)
- Sean Chandler (born 1996), safety for New York Giants (Camden)
- Michael Chang (born 1972), professional tennis player (Hoboken)
- Cheryl Chase (born 1958), voice actress, Angelica Pickles on Rugrats (Manville)
- Jeff Chase (born 1968), actor (Paterson)
- Mike Chernoff (born c. 1981), general manager of the Cleveland Indians (Livingston)
- Michael Chertoff (born 1953), U.S. secretary of Homeland Security under President George W. Bush (Elizabeth)
- Aneesh Chopra (born 1972), chief technology officer under Barack Obama (Trenton, raised in Princeton Junction)
- Chris Christie (born 1962), 55th governor of New Jersey (Newark)
- Jack Ciattarelli (born 1961), politician (Hillsborough)
- Vinny Ciurciu (born 1980), National Football League linebacker (Hackensack)
- Earl Clark (born 1988), forward for the Los Angeles Lakers (Plainfield)
- Harlan Coben (born 1962), author of mystery novels and thrillers (Newark, raised in Livingston)
- Robert Coello (born 1984), pitcher for the Toronto Blue Jays (Bayonne)
- Willie Cole (born 1955), sculptor (Newark)
- Ross Colton (born 1996), ice hockey center for the Tampa Bay Lightning (Robbinsville)
- Mattea Conforti (born 2006), actress
- Kristen Connolly (born 1980), actress, As the World Turns, House of Cards, Zoo (Montclair)
- Richard Conte (1910–1975), actor, The Godfather (Jersey City)
- Kellyanne Conway (born 1967), campaign manager for Donald Trump, counselor to the president (Camden, raised in Hammonton)
- Greg Coolidge (born 1972), actor, screenwriter, director (Red Bank)
- David Copperfield (born 1956), illusionist (Metuchen)
- Sam Coppola (1932–2012), actor (Jersey City)
- Barbara Corcoran (born 1949), businesswoman, investor, and television personality (Edgewater)
- Joseph Cortese (born 1949), actor (Paterson)
- Phil Costa (born 1987), center and guard for the Dallas Cowboys (Moorestown)
- Blake Costanzo (born 1984), linebacker for the Chicago Bears (Franklin Lakes)
- Lou Costello (1906–1959), comedian, actor, Abbott and Costello films and television series (Paterson)
- Bob Cottingham (born 1966), Olympic sabre fencer, 1988 and 1992
- Jonathan Townley Crane (1819–1880), clergyman, author, abolitionist (Union Township)
- Stephen Crane (1871–1900), novelist, short story writer, poet, journalist (Newark)
- Michael Cristofer (born 1945), Pulitzer Prize and Tony winning playwright; screenwriter; actor; director (Trenton)
- Joseph Cross (born 1986), actor, Running with Scissors, Flags of Our Fathers (New Brunswick)
- Crowbar (born 1974), professional wrestler (Rutherford)
- Valerie Cruz (born 1976), actress, Nip/Tuck, The Dresden Files, Dexter (Elizabeth)
- Victor Cruz (born 1986), wide receiver for the New York Giants (Paterson)
- Ken Cuccinelli (born 1968), Attorney General of Virginia (Edison)
- John T. Cunningham (1915–2012), journalist, writer, and historian (Newark, raised in Brookside)
- Vincent Curatola (born 1953), actor, Johnny Sack on The Sopranos (Englewood)
- Vinny Curry (born 1988), defensive end for the Philadelphia Eagles (Neptune)
- Brian Cushing (born 1987), outside linebacker for the Houston Texans (Park Ridge)
- Jack Cust (born 1979), designated hitter and outfielder for the New York Yankees (Flemington)
- Tawny Cypress (born 1976), actress, K-Ville, Heroes (Point Pleasant)
- Mike Daniels (born 1989), defensive end for the Green Bay Packers (Stratford)
- Joe Dante (born 1946), film director, Gremlins (Morristown)
- Glenn Danzig (born 1955), Misfits and Danzig frontman (Lodi)
- Jeff Datz (born 1959), third base coach for the Seattle Mariners (Camden)
- Dov Davidoff (born 1973), comedian, actor (Englishtown)
- Anthony Davis (born 1989), offensive tackle for the San Francisco 49ers (Piscataway)
- Brett Davis (born 1988), comedian (Roxbury)
- Hope Davis (born 1964), actress, About Schmidt, American Splendor, The Hoax (Englewood)
- Lanny Davis (born 1946), special counsel to the president to Bill Clinton (Jersey City)
- Ida Wharton Dawson (1860–1928), president, New Jersey State Federation of Women's Clubs
- Sandra Dee (1942–2005), actress, Gidget, A Summer Place (Bayonne)
- Robert De Grasse (1900–1971), cinematographer (Maplewood)
- Dean DeLeo (born 1961), guitarist for Stone Temple Pilots, Talk Show, Army of Anyone, Laughter Train (Montclair)
- Mark Delavan (born 1958), operatic bass-baritone (born in Princeton, lives in Chatham)
- Martina Deignan, soap opera actress, Santa Barbara, As the World Turns (East Orange)
- Mary R. Denman (1823–1899), first president of the New Jersey Woman's Christian Temperance Union
- Mark DeRosa (born 1975), utility player for the Washington Nationals (Passaic)
- Beatie Deutsch (née Rabin; born 1989), ultra-Orthodox Jewish American-Israeli marathon runner
- Danny DeVito (born 1944), actor and director, Taxi, Hoffa, War of the Roses, Get Shorty, Batman Returns, It's Always Sunny in Philadelphia (Neptune City)
- Tommy DeVito (1928–2020), musician and singer; lead guitarist of The Four Seasons (Belleville)
- Khigh Dhiegh (1910–1991), actor, Wo Fat on Hawaii Five-O (Spring Lake)
- Al Di Meola (born 1954), professional jazz/fusion/world music guitarist; played with Chick Corea's Return for Forever, successful solo career, and work with John McLaughlin, Paco de Lucia, and countless others (Jersey City, New Jersey)
- Ernest Dickerson (born 1951), film and television director (Newark)
- John DiMaggio (born 1968), voice actor, Bender on Futurama (North Plainfield)
- Pat DiNizio (1955–2017), singer, The Smithereens (Scotch Plains)
- Peter Dinklage (born 1969), actor, Elf, Game of Thrones (Morristown, raised in Mendham Township)
- Peter Dobson (born 1964), actor, Cover Me (Red Bank)
- The Dolan Twins (born 1999), comedians (Long Valley section of Washington Township)
- Franklin D'Olier (1877–1953), businessman; first national commander of the American Legion (1919–1920)
- Tate Donovan (born 1963), actor, Damages, The O.C., Hercules (Tenafly)
- Jamie Donnelly (born 1947), actress (Teaneck)
- Ruth Donnelly (1896–1982), actress (Trenton)
- Michael Douglas (born 1944), Academy Award-winning actor, producer (New Brunswick)
- Jim Dowd (born 1968), professional ice hockey player (Brick Township)
- Al Downing (born 1941), professional baseball pitcher New York Yankees, Oakland A's, Milwaukee Brewers, Los Angeles Dodgers, NL Comeback Player of the Year 1971 (Trenton)
- Doyle Wolfgang von Frankenstein (born 1964), guitarist, The Misfits (Lodi)
- Dylan Dreyer (born 1981), meteorologist for the Today Show (Manalapan)
- Derek Drymon (born 1965), cartoon producer, SpongeBob SquarePants (Morristown)
- Thomas F. Duffy (born 1955), actor (Woodbridge)
- Tom Dugan (born 1961), one-person show actor, writer and director (Rahway)
- Tabitha D'umo (born 1973), dance teacher, choreographer, and creative director (Galloway)
- Jancee Dunn (born 1966), journalist, author, and former VJ for MTV2 (Chatham)
- Kirsten Dunst (born 1982), actress (Point Pleasant)
- Ashley Alexandra Dupré (born 1985), prostitute, singer (Beachwood)
- Asher Brown Durand (1796–1886), artist (Maplewood)
- Lou Duva (1922–2017), boxing trainer and sports personality (Paterson)
- Andrea Dworkin (1946–2005), radical feminist and activist (Camden)
- Alix Earle (born 2000), social media personality (Wall Township)
- Frederick Eberhardt (1868–1946), engineer, philanthropist, university administrator and businessman (Newark)
- Daniel Edelman (born 2003), midfielder for MLS club New York Red Bulls
- Randy Edelman (born 1947), film and TV score composer (Paterson)
- Frankie Edgar (born 1981), mixed martial artist (Toms River)
- Geoff Edwards (1931–2014), actor, radio and television personality (Westfield)
- Todd Edwards (born 1972), music producer (Bloomfield)
- Róisín Egenton (born 1977), 2000 International Rose of Tralee (Fanwood)
- Hallie Kate Eisenberg (born 1992), teen actress (East Brunswick)
- Pablo Eisenberg (1932–2022), scholar, social justice advocate, and tennis player
- Hy Eisman (1927–2025), cartoonist, Katy Keene, Little Iodine, Katzenjammer Kids, Popeye (Paterson)
- Robert Ellenstein (1923–2010), actor (Newark)
- Linda Emond (born 1959), actress, Julie & Julia (New Brunswick)
- Alecko Eskandarian (born 1982), soccer player (Montvale)
- Janet Evanovich (born 1943), novelist (South River)
- Bill Evans (1929–1980), jazz pianist and composer (Plainfield)
- Josh Evans (born 1991), safety for the Jacksonville Jaguars (Irvington)
- Charles Evered (born 1964), writer, director (Passaic, raised in Rutherford)
- Greg Evigan (born 1953), actor, B. J. and the Bear, My Two Dads (South Amboy)
- Ellen Hackl Fagan (born 1960), abstract artist and curator
- Donald Fagen (born 1948), musician (Steely Dan) (South Brunswick)
- Joseph Farah (born 1954), journalist and editor-in-chief of WorldNetDaily (Paterson)
- Tali Farhadian (born 1974/1975), former US federal prosecutor (Englewood Cliffs)
- Kenneth Faried (born 1989), power forward for the Denver Nuggets (Newark)
- Taissa Farmiga (born 1994), actress, American Horror Story, The Bling Ring (Readington)
- Vera Farmiga (born 1973), actress, The Departed, Up in the Air (Clifton)
- John Farrell (born 1962), manager for the Boston Red Sox (Monmouth Beach)
- Warren Farrell (born 1943), educator, gender equality activist and author
- Edward Feigenbaum (born 1936), computer scientist known as "the father of expert systems" (Weehawken)
- Fetty Wap, real name Willie Maxwell II (born 1991), singer, rapper (Paterson)
- Cirie Fields (born 1970), reality TV personality best known for Survivor. (Jersey City)
- Joan Field (1915–1988), violinist (Long Branch)
- Joe Fields (born 1953), NFL center, primarily with the New York Jets (Woodbury)
- Nic Fink (born 1993), Olympic swimmer (Morristown)
- Anthony Firkser (born 1995), football tight end for the New England Patriots of the National Football League
- Dale S. Fischer (born 1951), US district court judge
- Gail Fisher (1935–2000), actress, Mannix (Orange)
- Leo Fitzpatrick (born 1978), actor, Johnny Weeks on The Wire (West Orange)
- Minkah Fitzpatrick (born 1996), NFL safety (Old Bridge)
- Joe Flacco (born 1985), NFL quarterback for the Baltimore Ravens (Audubon)
- Harris Flanagin (1817–1874), governor of Arkansas (Roadstown, died in Arkansas)
- Susan Flannery (born 1939), soap opera actress (Jersey City)
- Fletcher (born 1994), pop singer (born in Asbury Park, raised in Wall Township)
- Josh Flitter (born 1994), child actor (Ridgewood)
- Mary Florentine (born 1950), psychoacoustics researcher (Nutley)
- Richard Florida (born 1957), urban studies theorist, author of Who's Your City? (Newark)
- Jehyve Floyd (born 1997), basketball player in the Israeli Basketball Premier League
- Rick Folbaum (born 1969), television personality for Fox News (Cherry Hill)
- Dick Foran (1910–1979), Western film actor (Flemington)
- Malcolm Forbes (1919–1990), entrepreneur, publisher, New Jersey state senator (Englewood/Far Hills)
- Steve Forbes (born 1947), editor-in-chief of Forbes magazine; president and CEO of Forbes, Inc. (Morristown)
- Darren Ford (born 1985), outfielder for the Pittsburgh Pirates (Vineland)
- Mike Ford (born 1992), first baseman for the New York Yankees (Belle Mead)
- Gerard J. Foschini (born 1940), telecommunications engineer (Jersey City)
- Preston Foster (1900–1970), actor (Ocean City)
- Beth Fowler (born 1940), actress, singer (Jersey City)
- Randy Foye (born 1983), shooting guard/point guard for the Utah Jazz (Newark)
- Connie Francis (1937–2025), pop singer (Newark)
- Genie Francis (born 1962), actress, General Hospital (Englewood)
- Barney Frank (1940–2026), U.S. representative for Massachusetts (Bayonne)
- Waldo Frank (1889–1967), novelist, historian, literary critic (Long Branch)
- Todd Frazier (born 1986), infielder for the New York Yankees, previously Cincinnati Reds, Chicago White Sox (Point Pleasant)
- Dean Friedman (born 1955), singer-songwriter (Paramus)
- Lennie Friedman (born 1976), NFL offensive lineman for the Cleveland Browns (Livingston)
- Chad Frye (born 1972), cartoonist and illustrator (Florham Park)
- Greg Fulginiti (born 1951), recording and mastering engineer (Wildwood)
- Melissa Fumero (born 1982), actress, Brooklyn Nine-Nine (North Bergen)

=== G–S ===
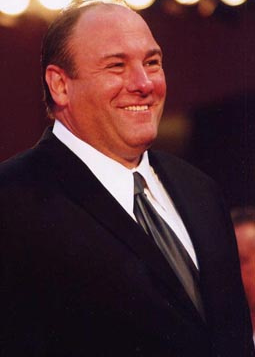
James Gandolfini

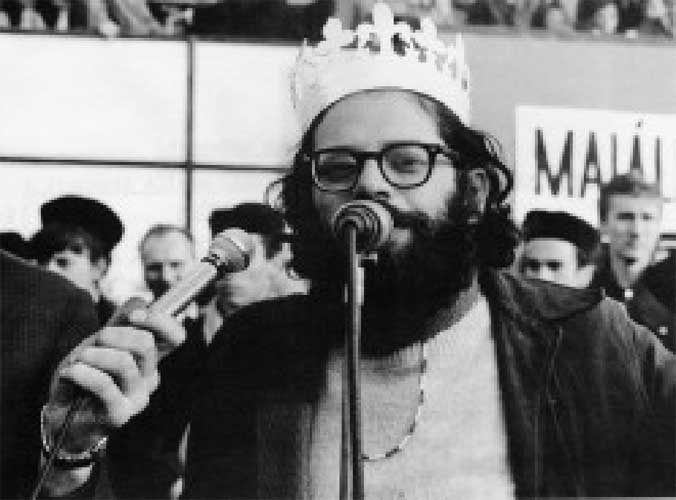
Allen Ginsberg

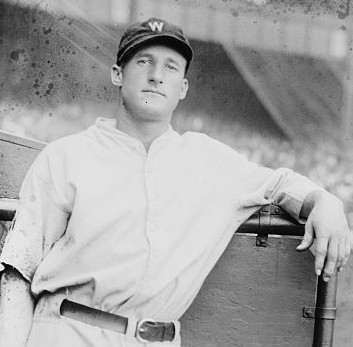
Goose Goslin

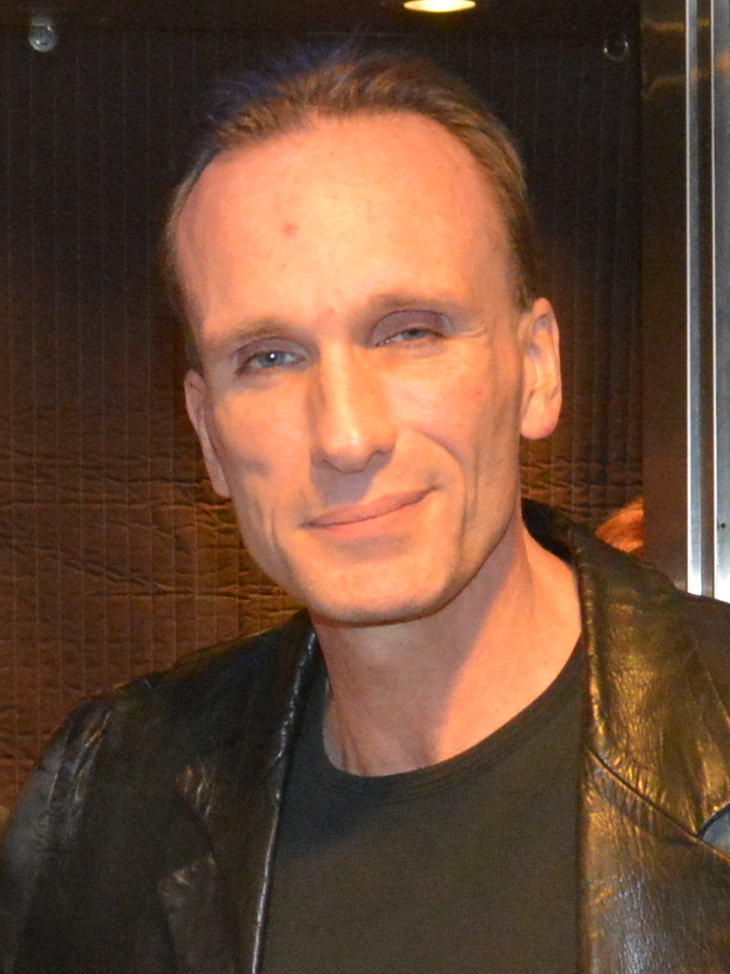
Peter Greene

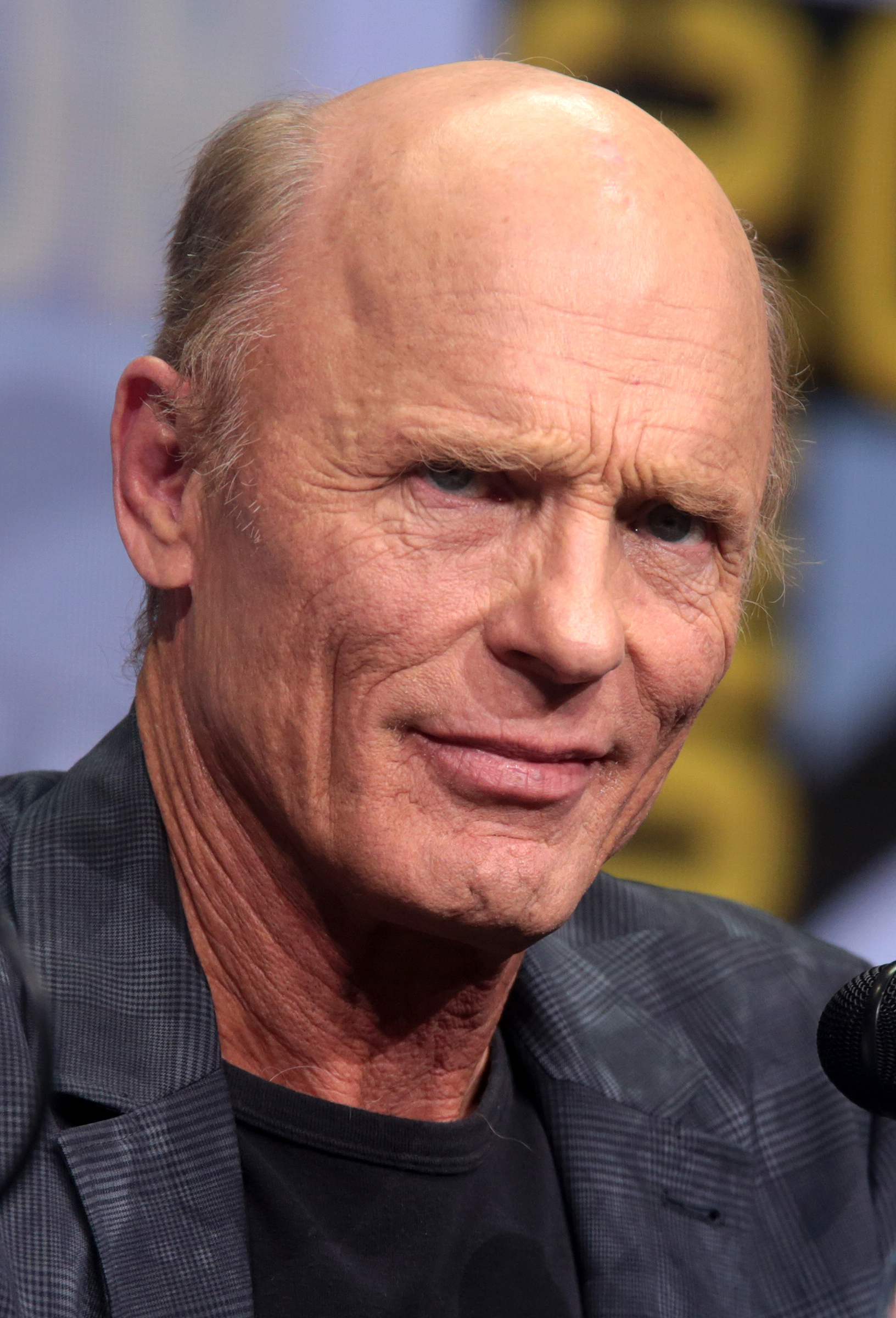
Ed Harris

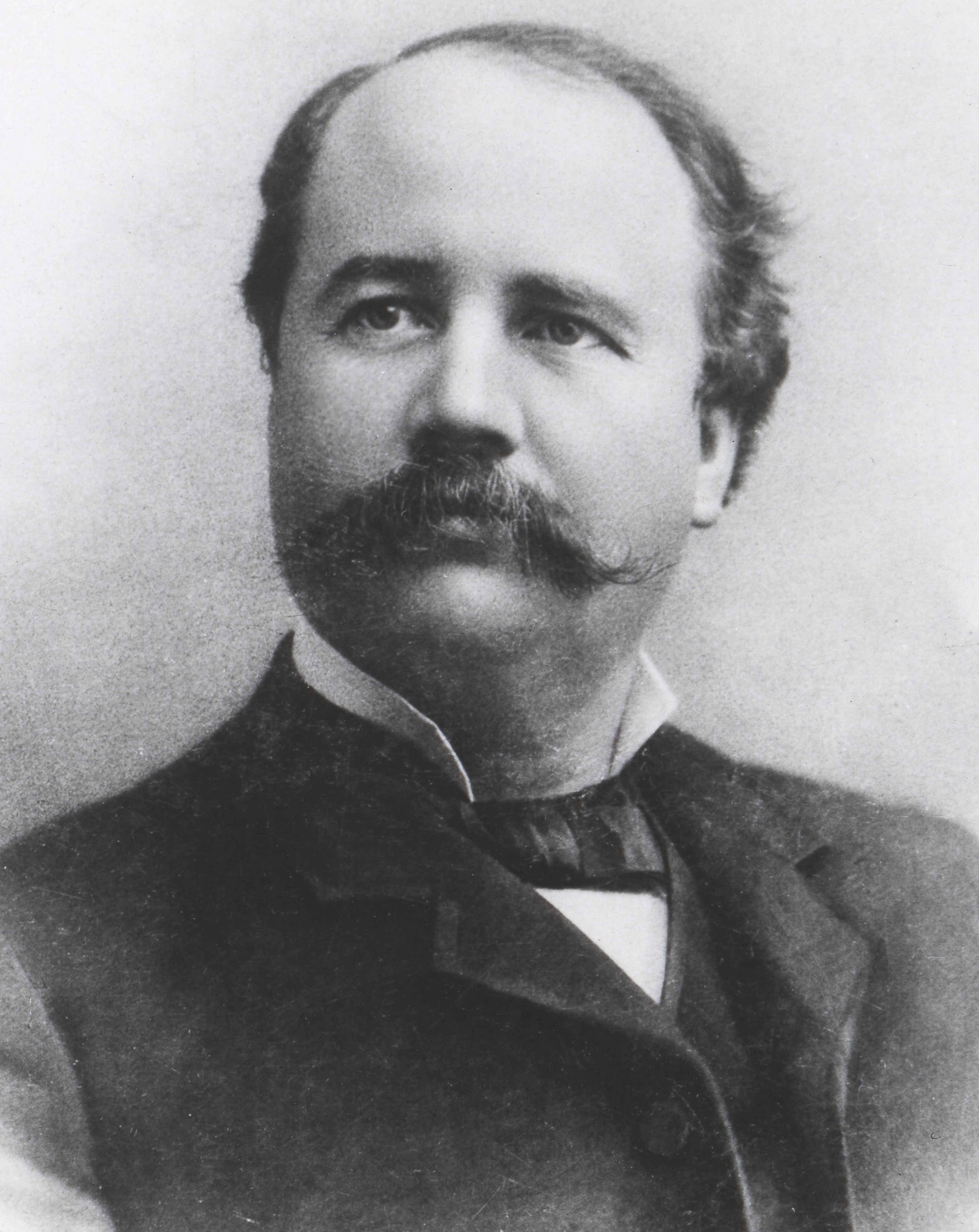
Garret Hobart

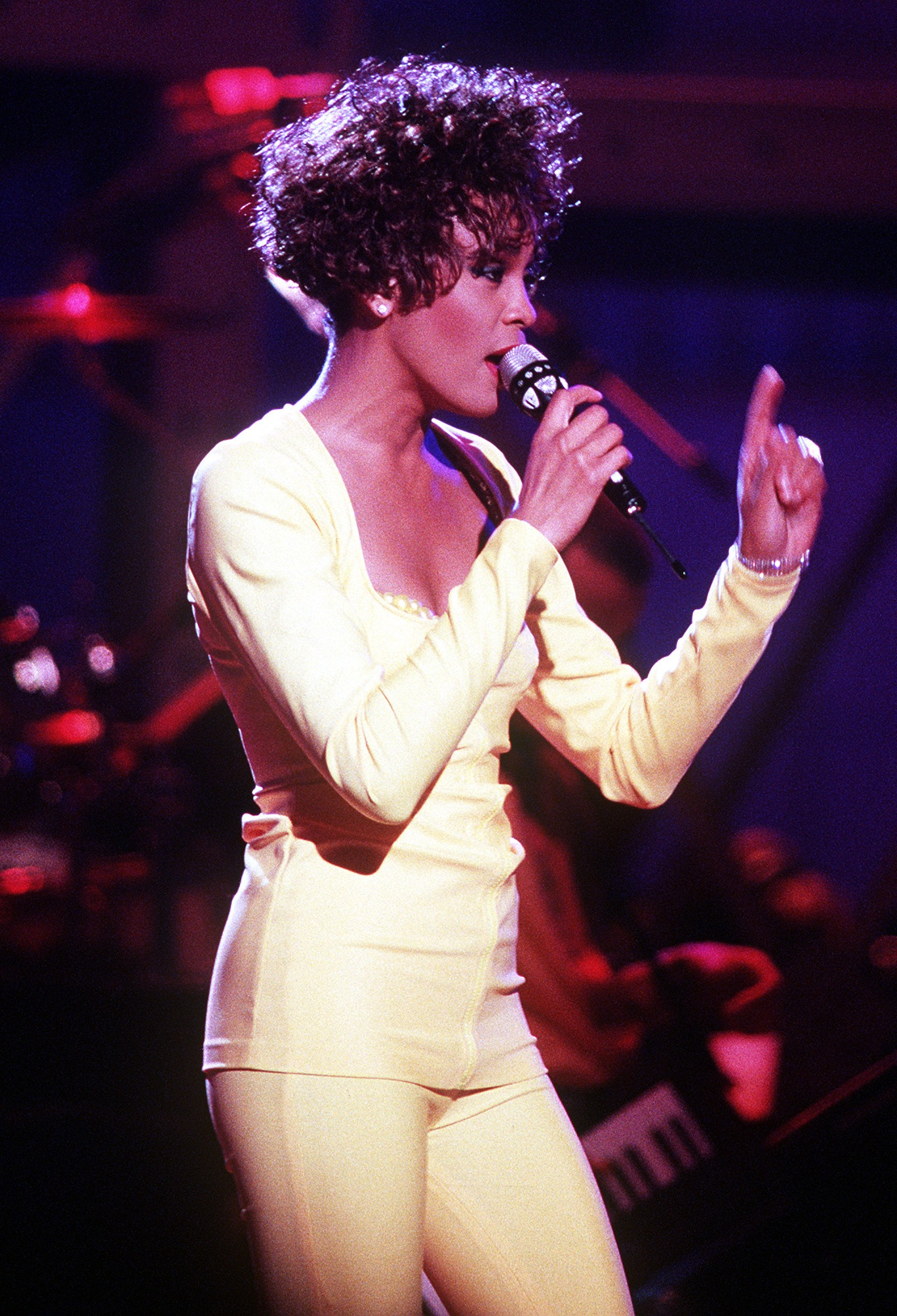
Whitney Houston

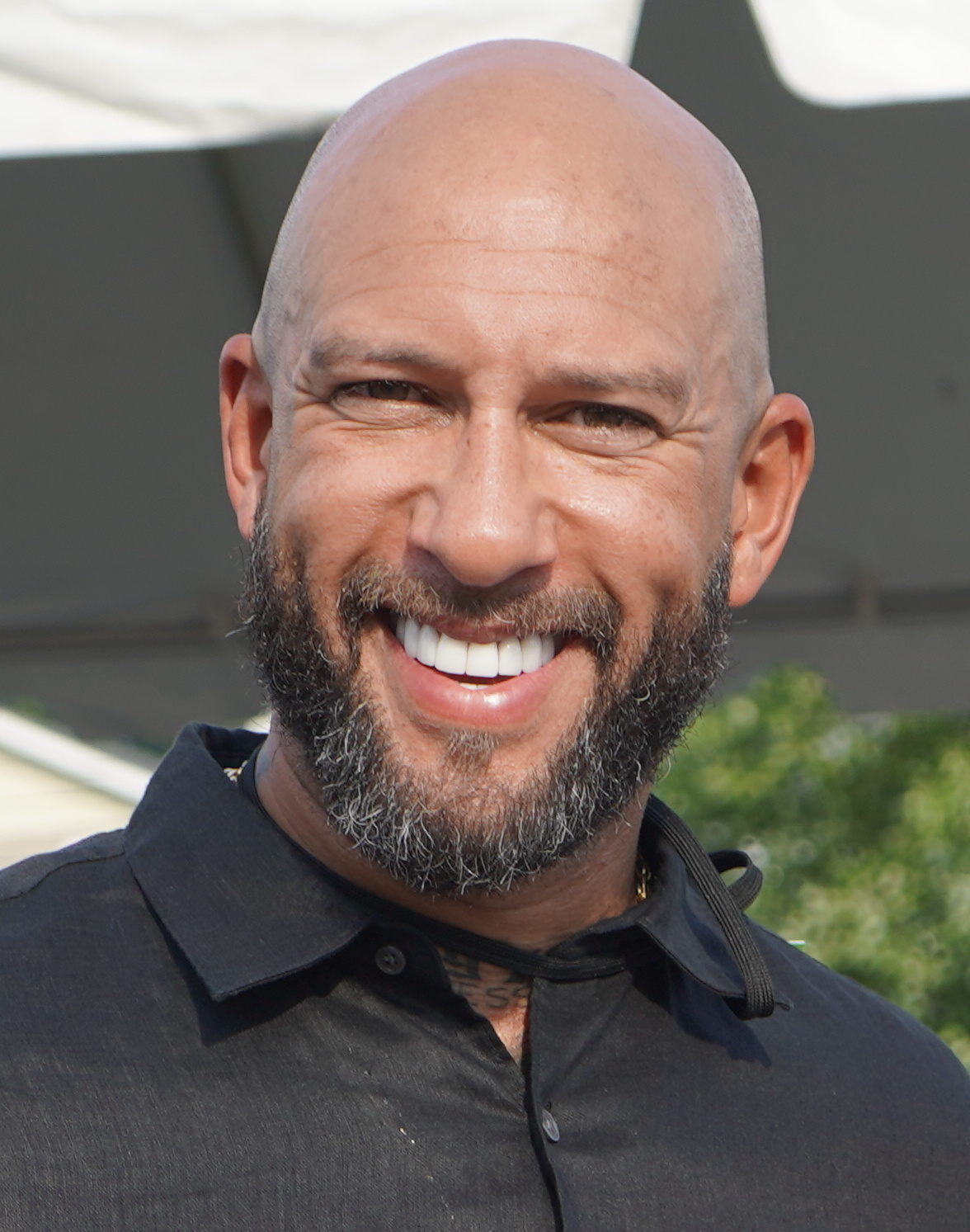
Tim Howard

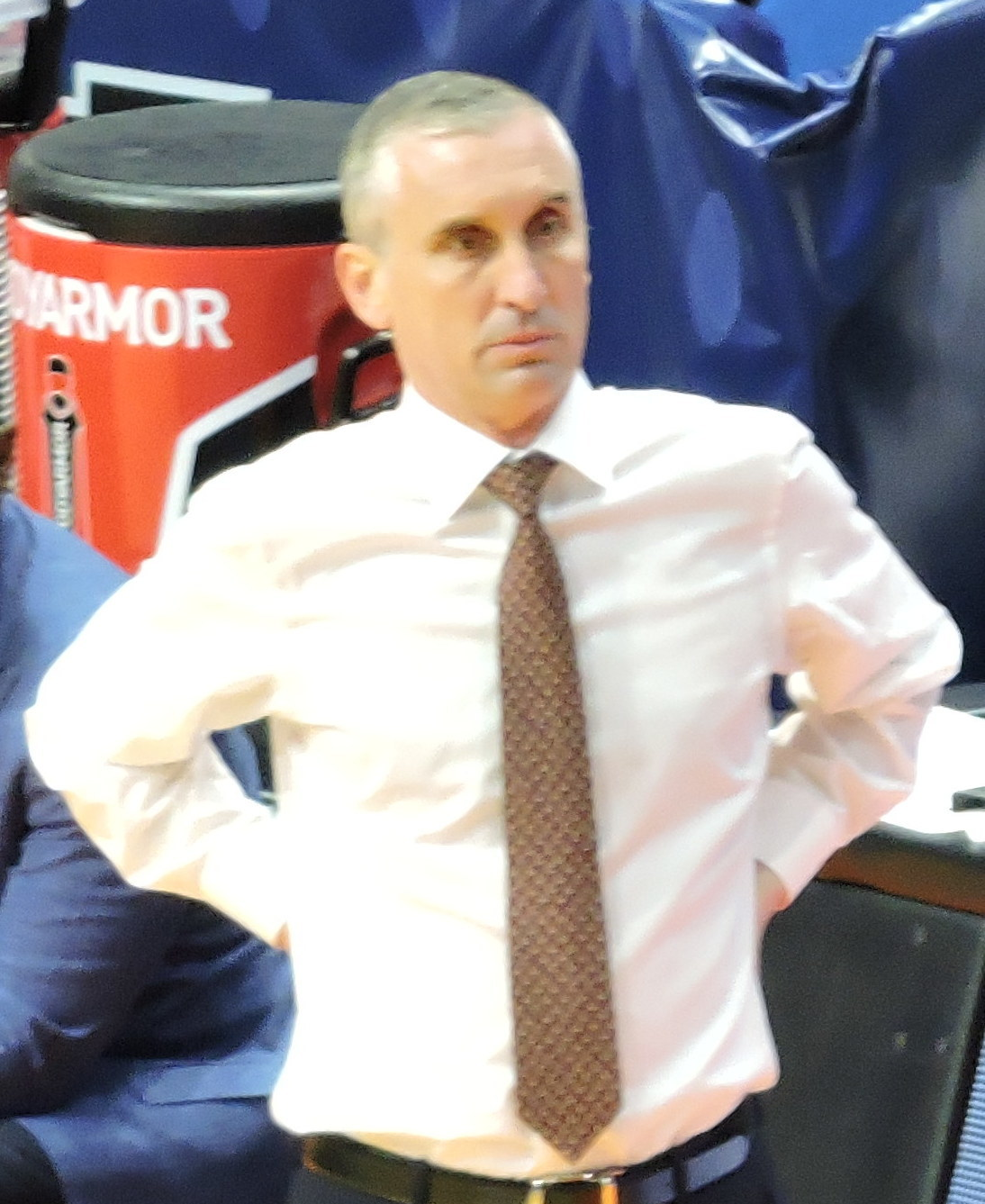
Bobby Hurley

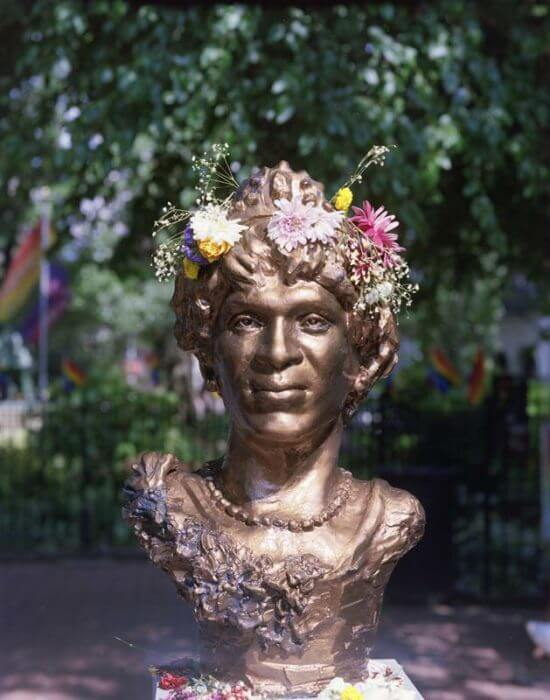
Marsha P. Johnson

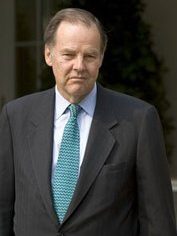
Thomas Kean

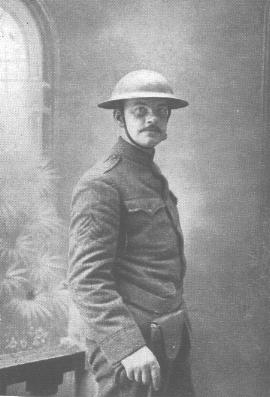
Joyce Kilmer

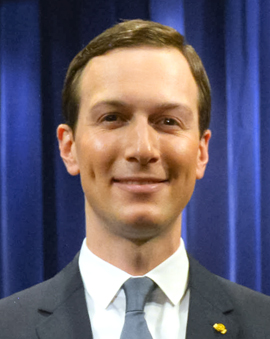
Jared Kushner

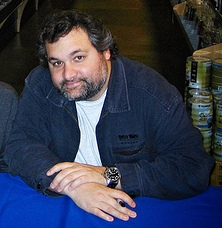
Artie Lange

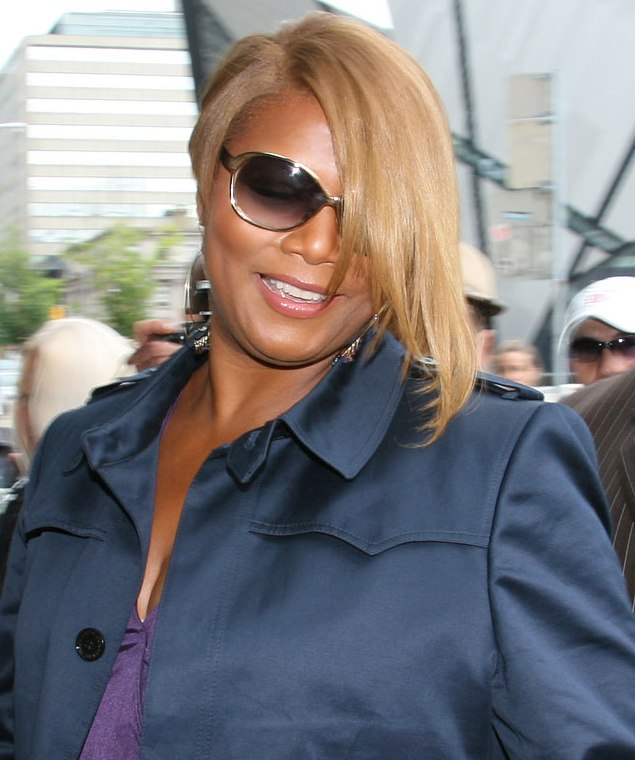
Queen Latifah

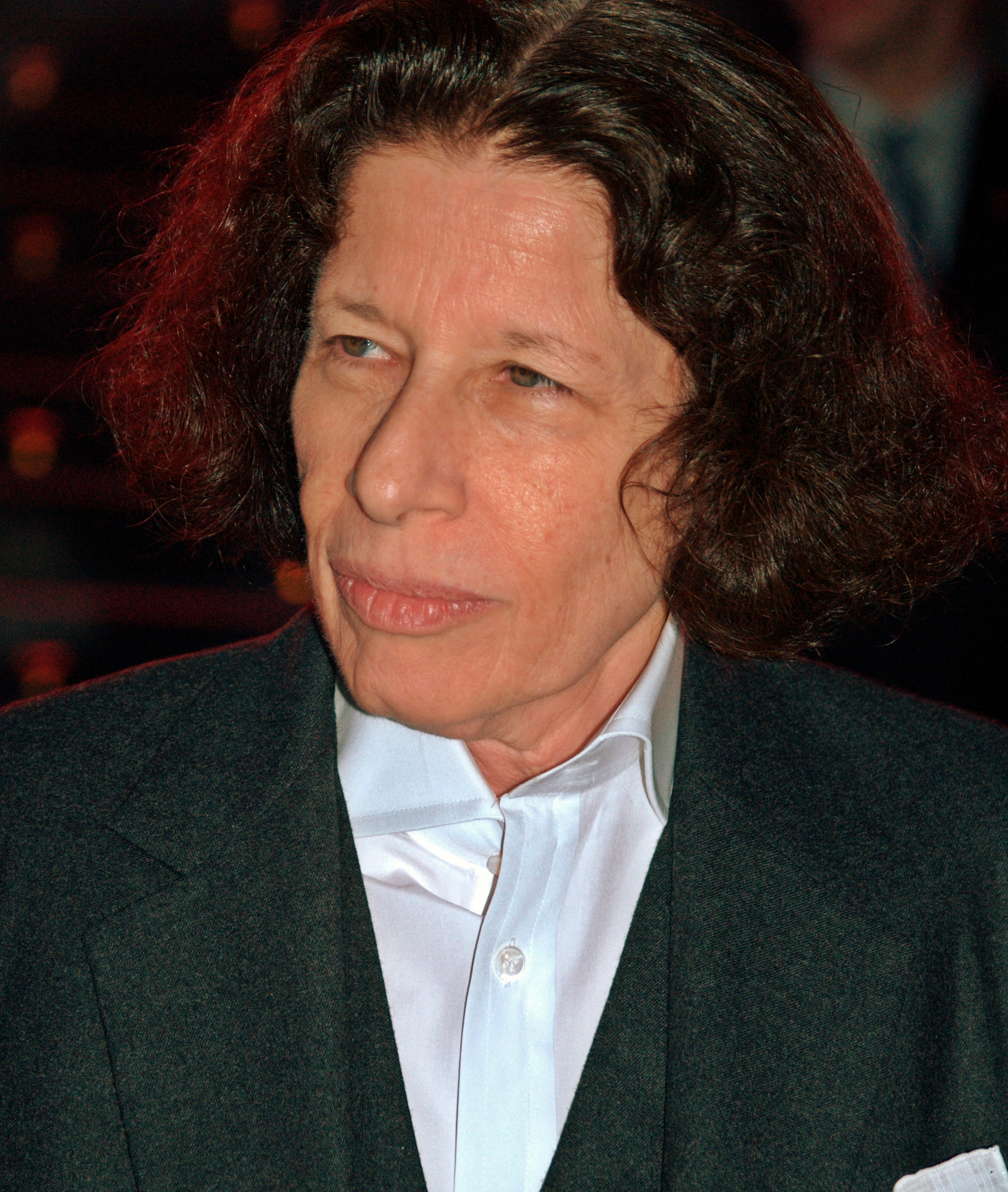
Fran Lebowitz

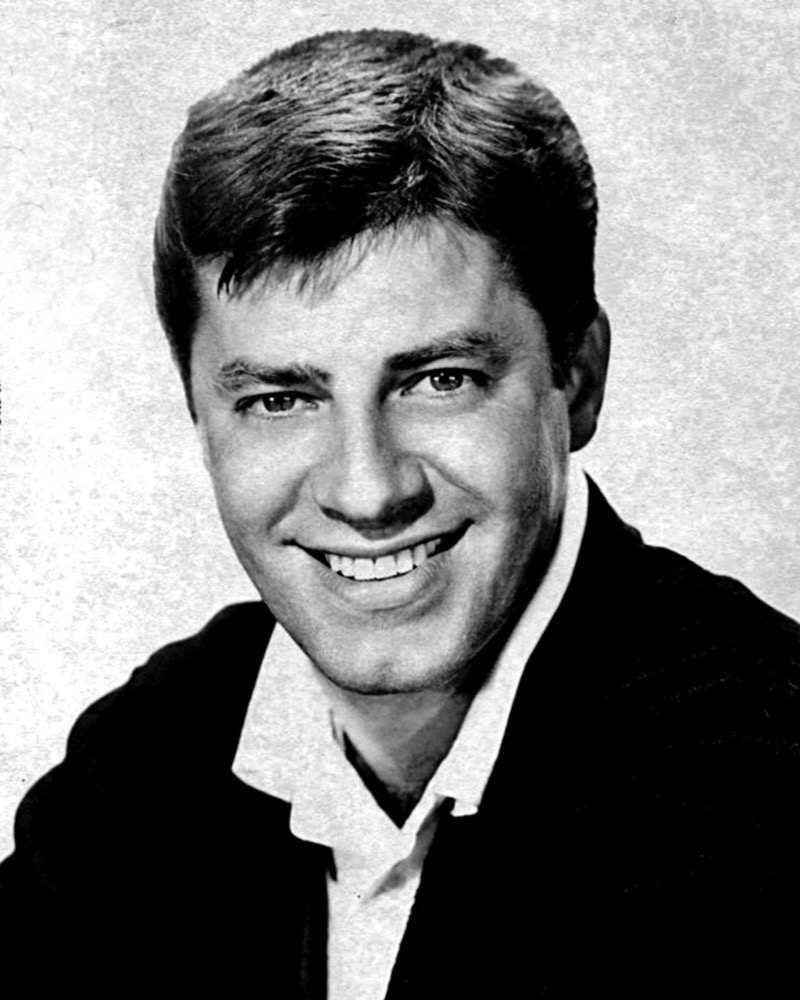
Jerry Lewis

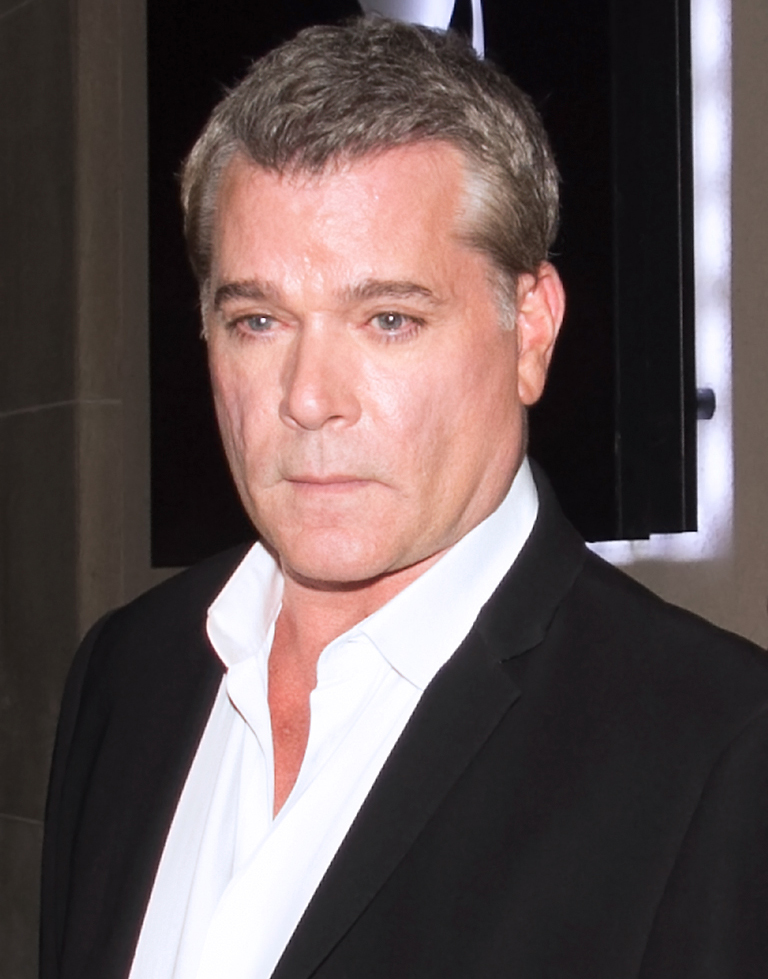
Ray Liotta

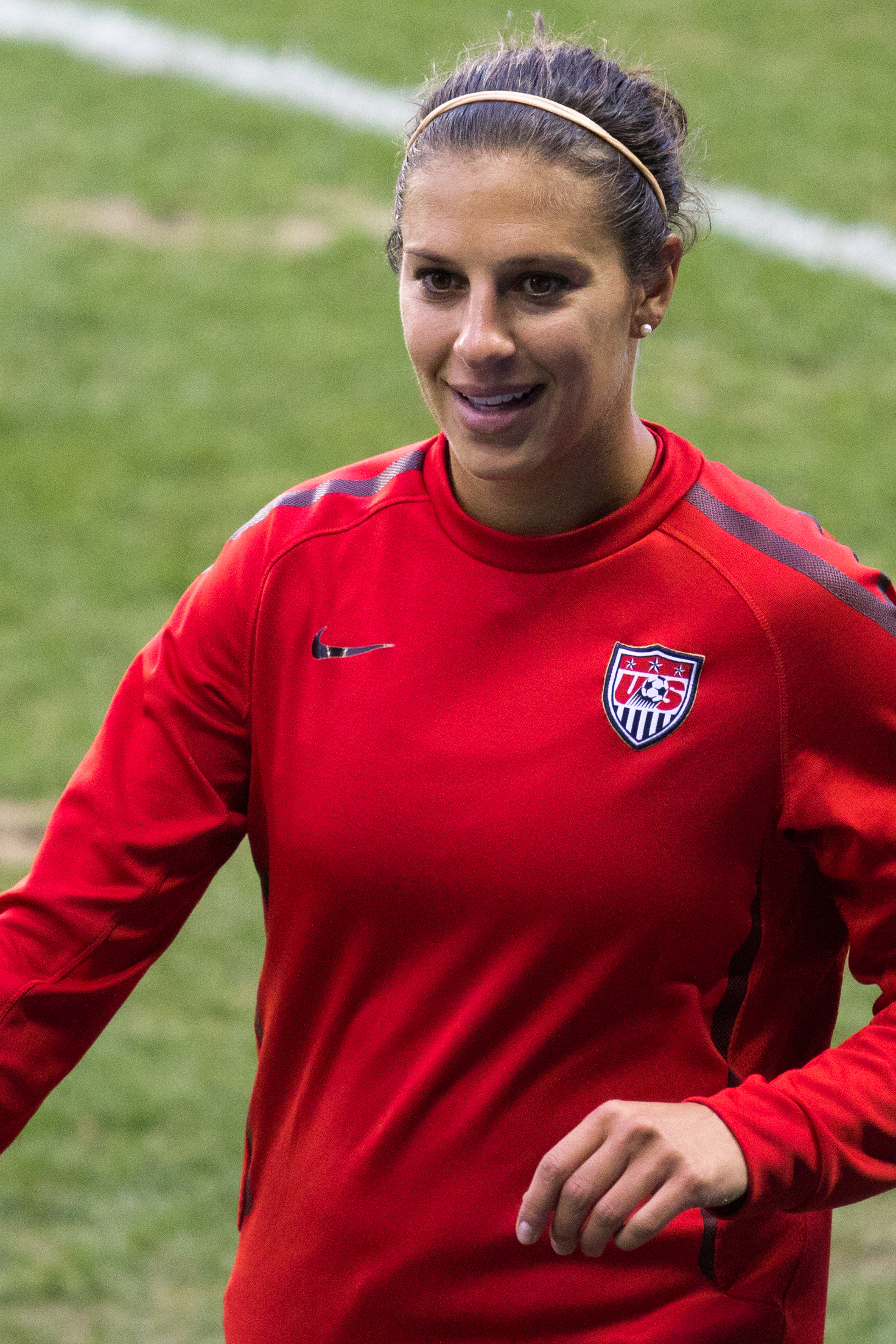
Carli Lloyd

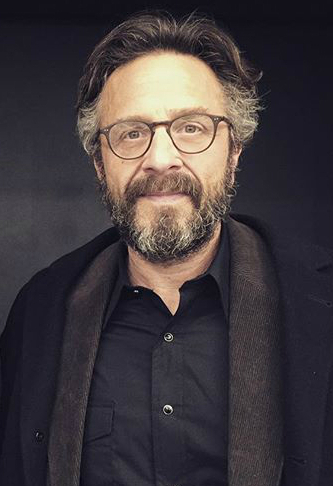
Marc Maron

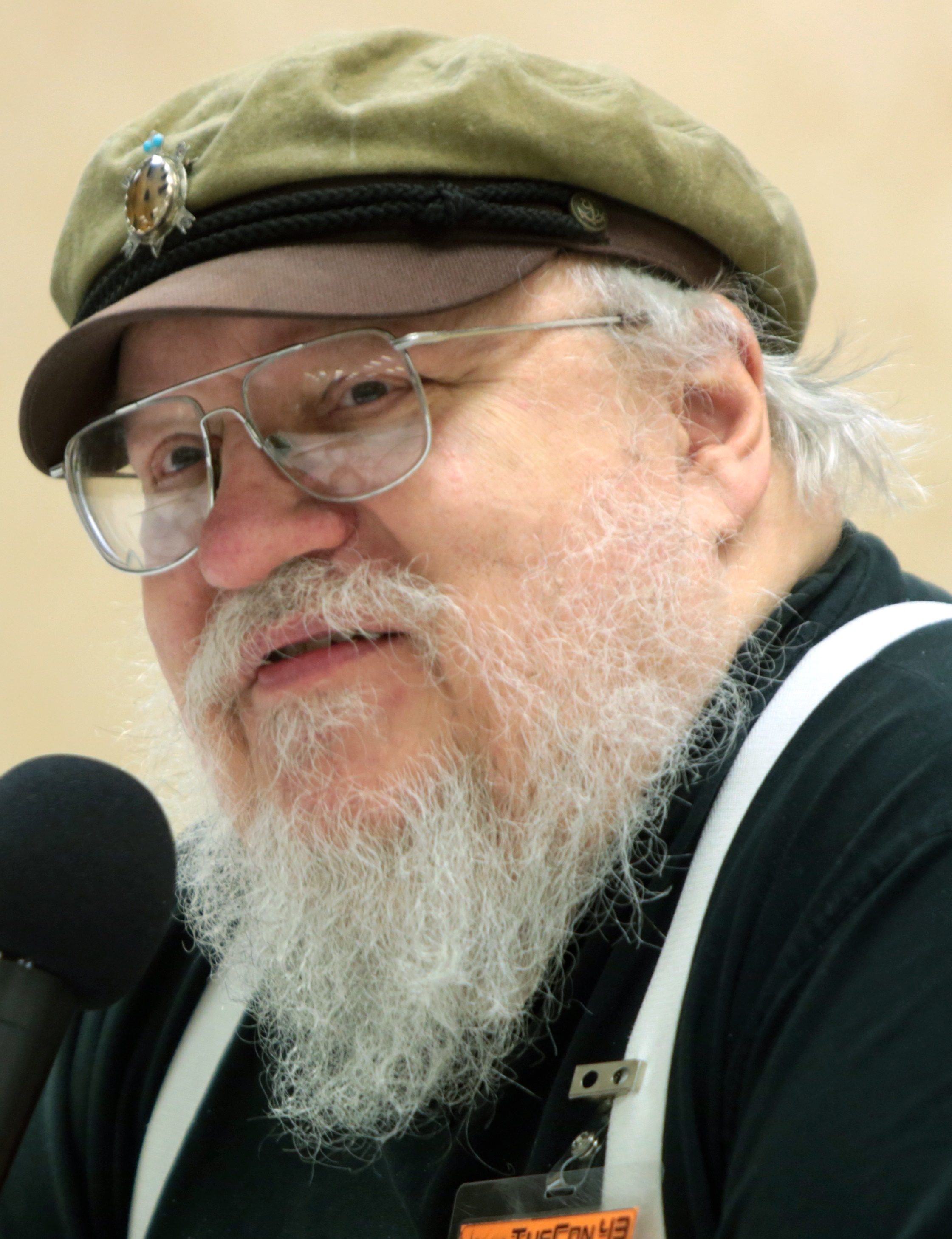
George R. R. Martin

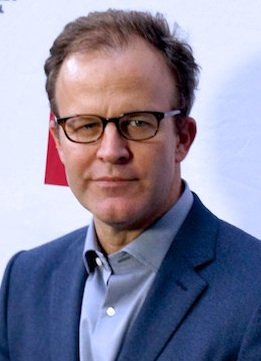
Tom McCarthy

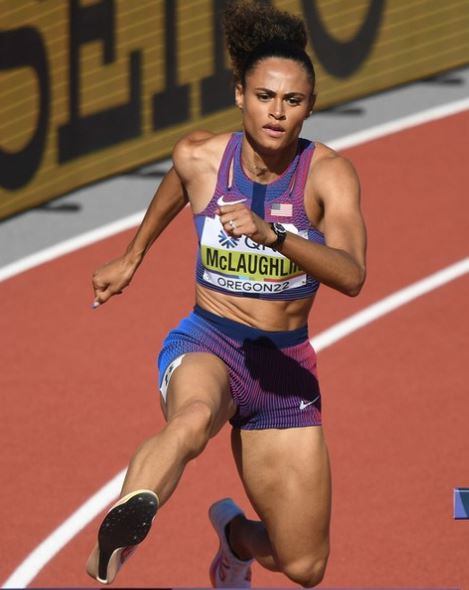
Sydney McLaughlin-Levrone

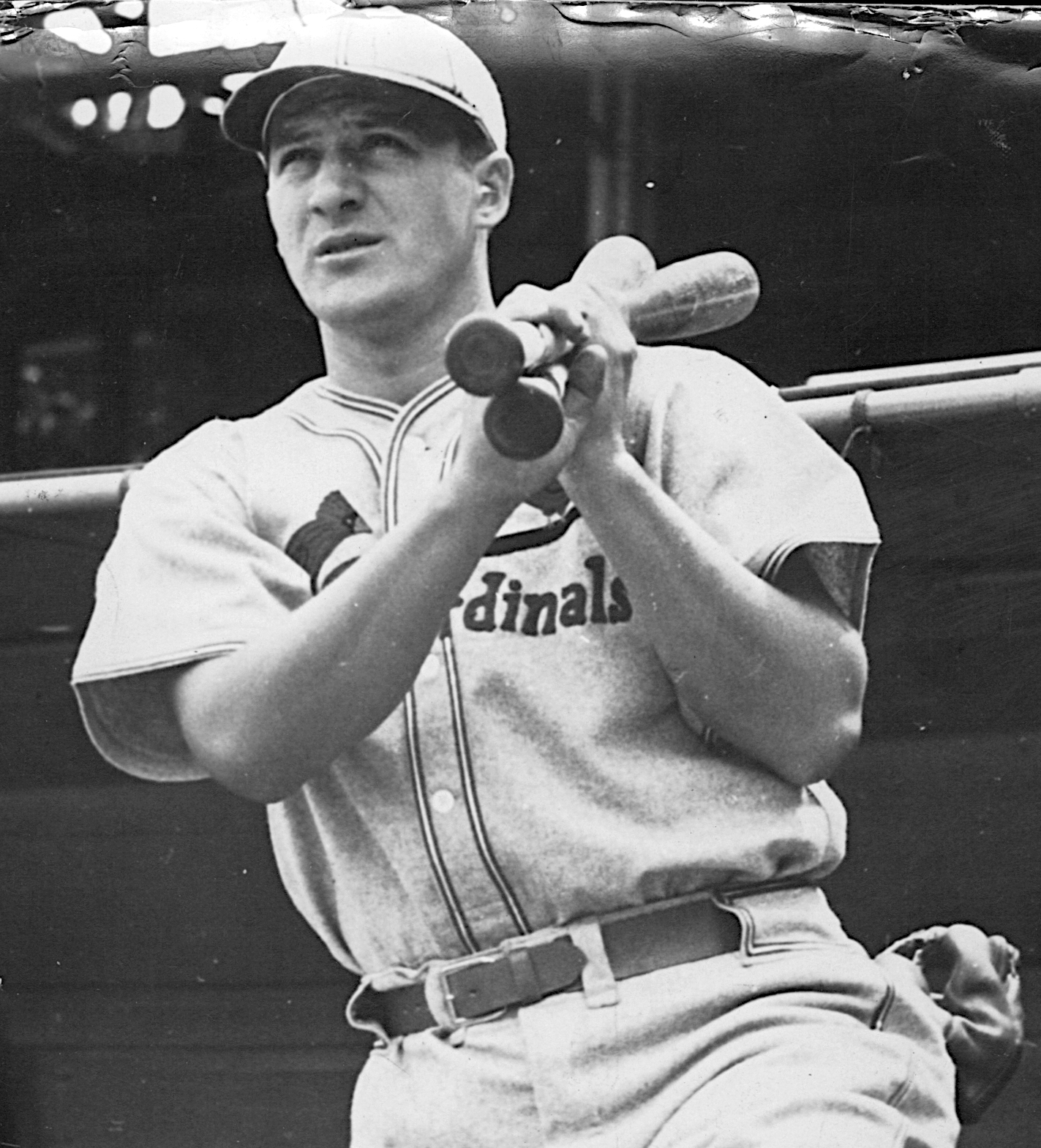
Joe Medwick

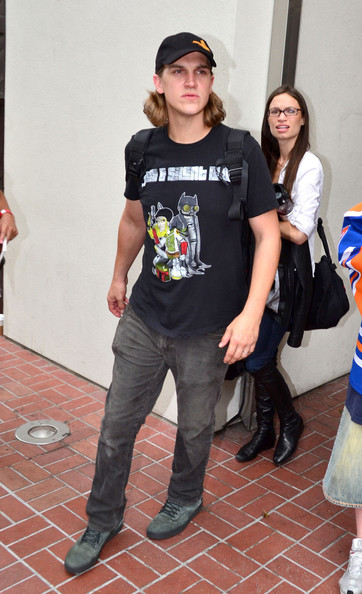
Jason Mewes

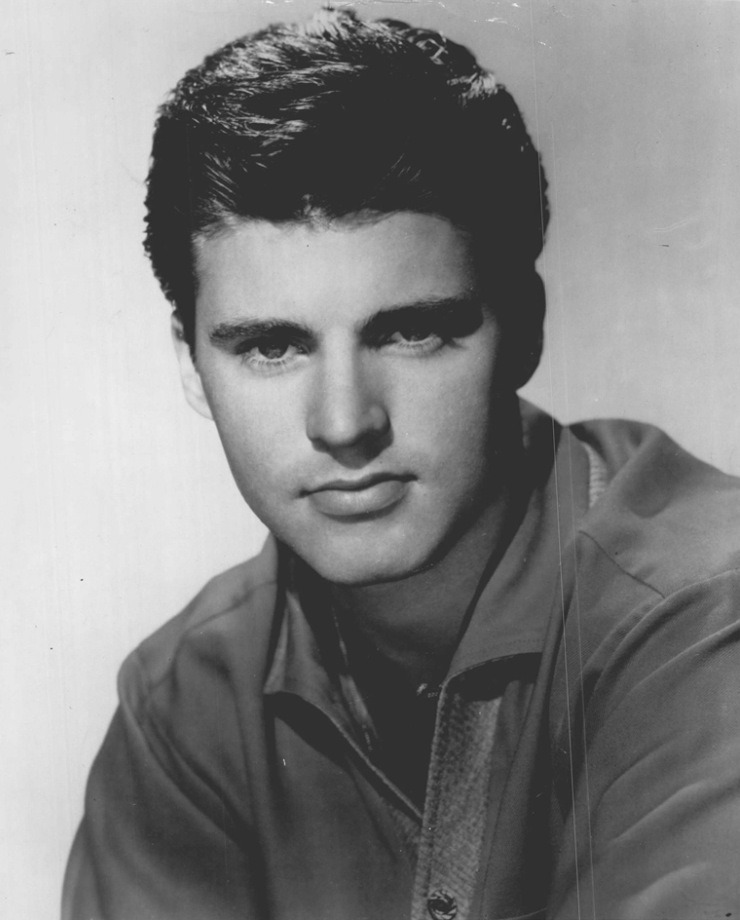
Ricky Nelson

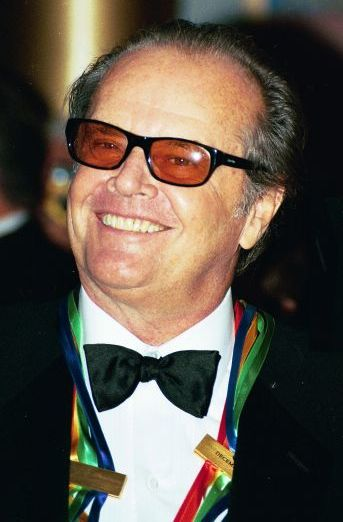
Jack Nicholson

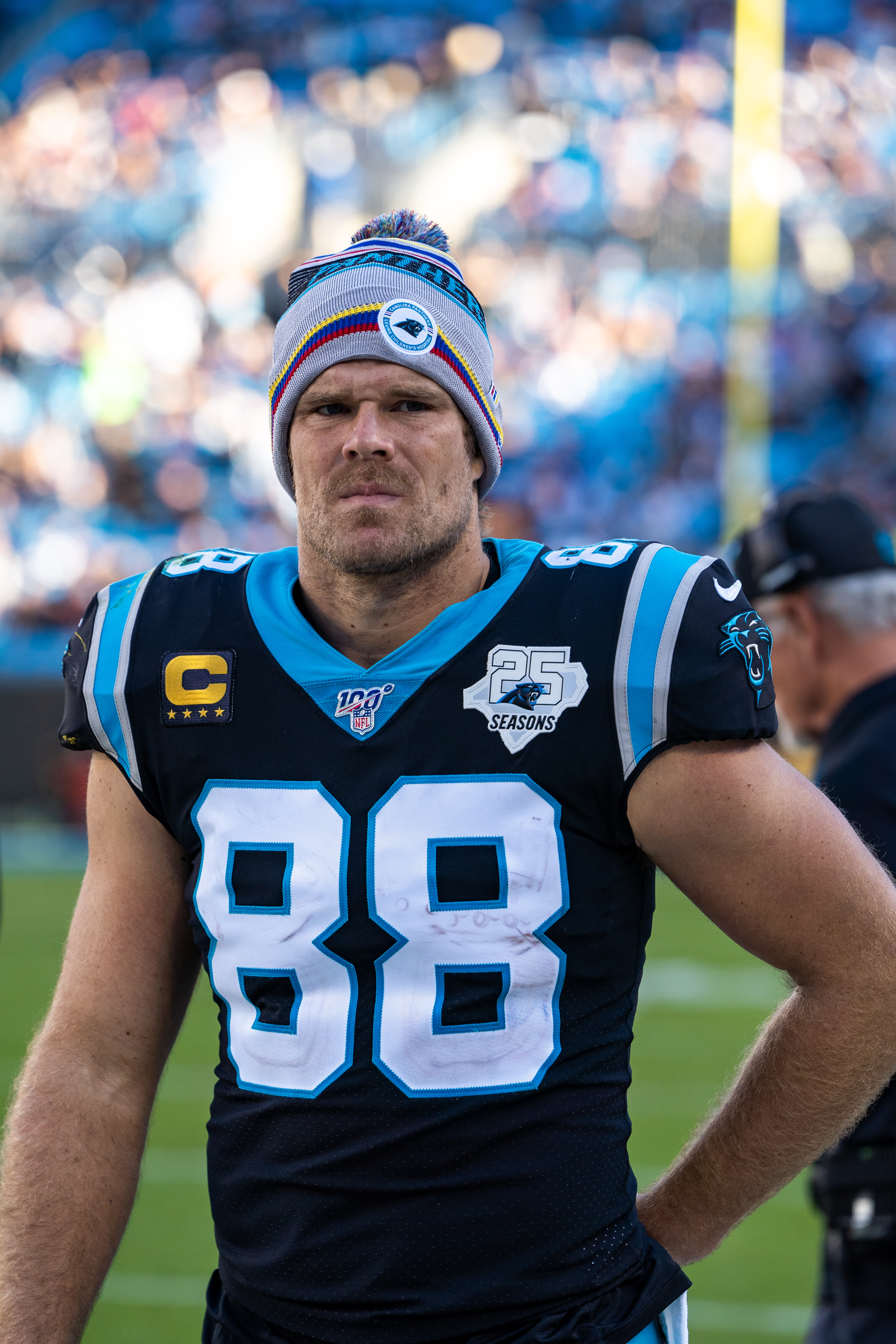
Greg Olsen

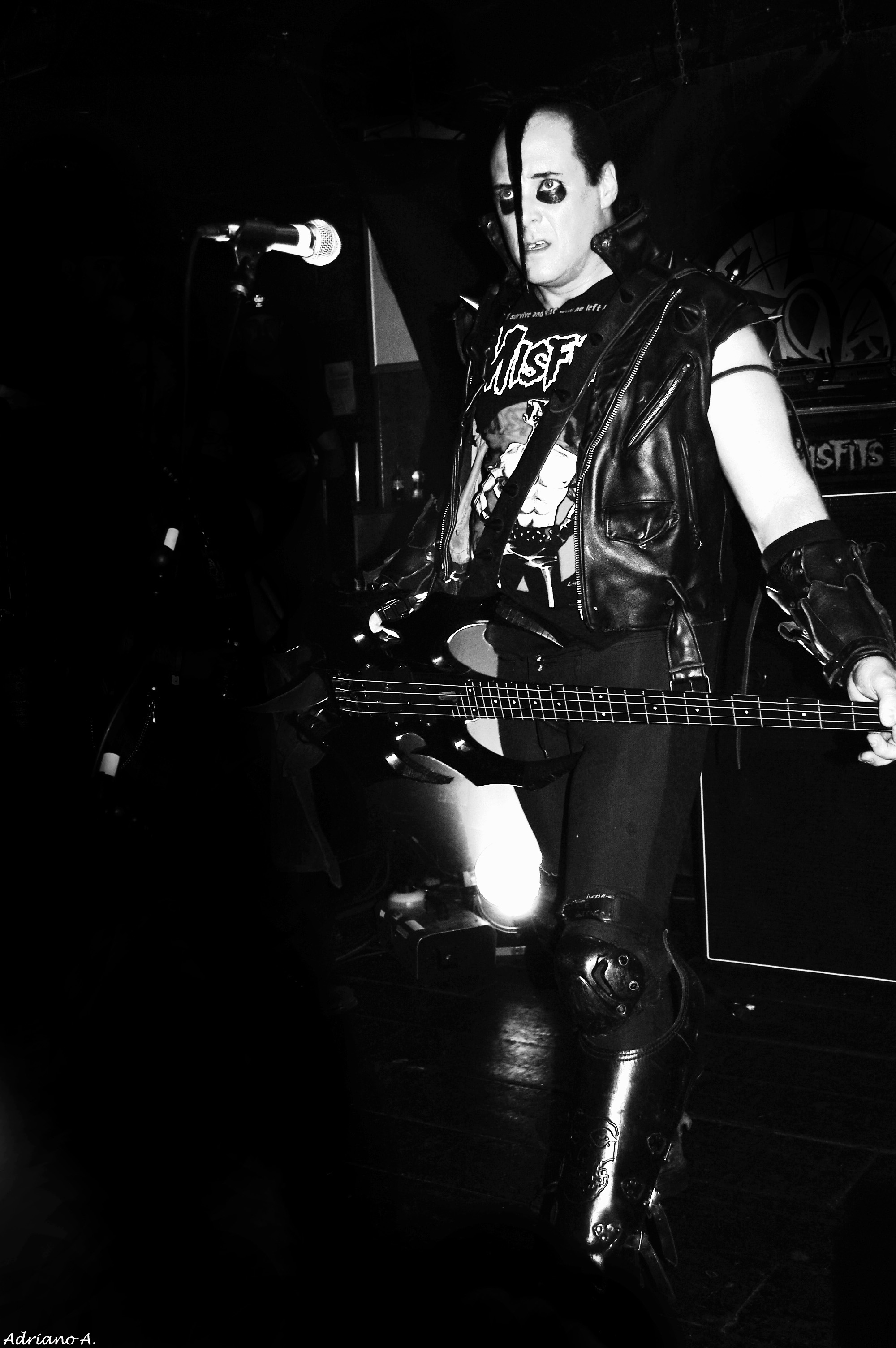
Jerry Only

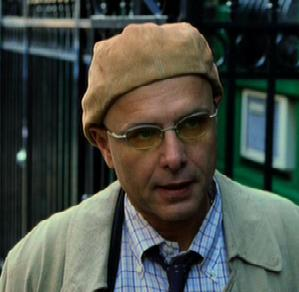
Joe Pantoliano

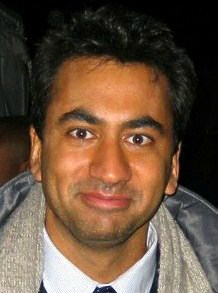
Kal Penn

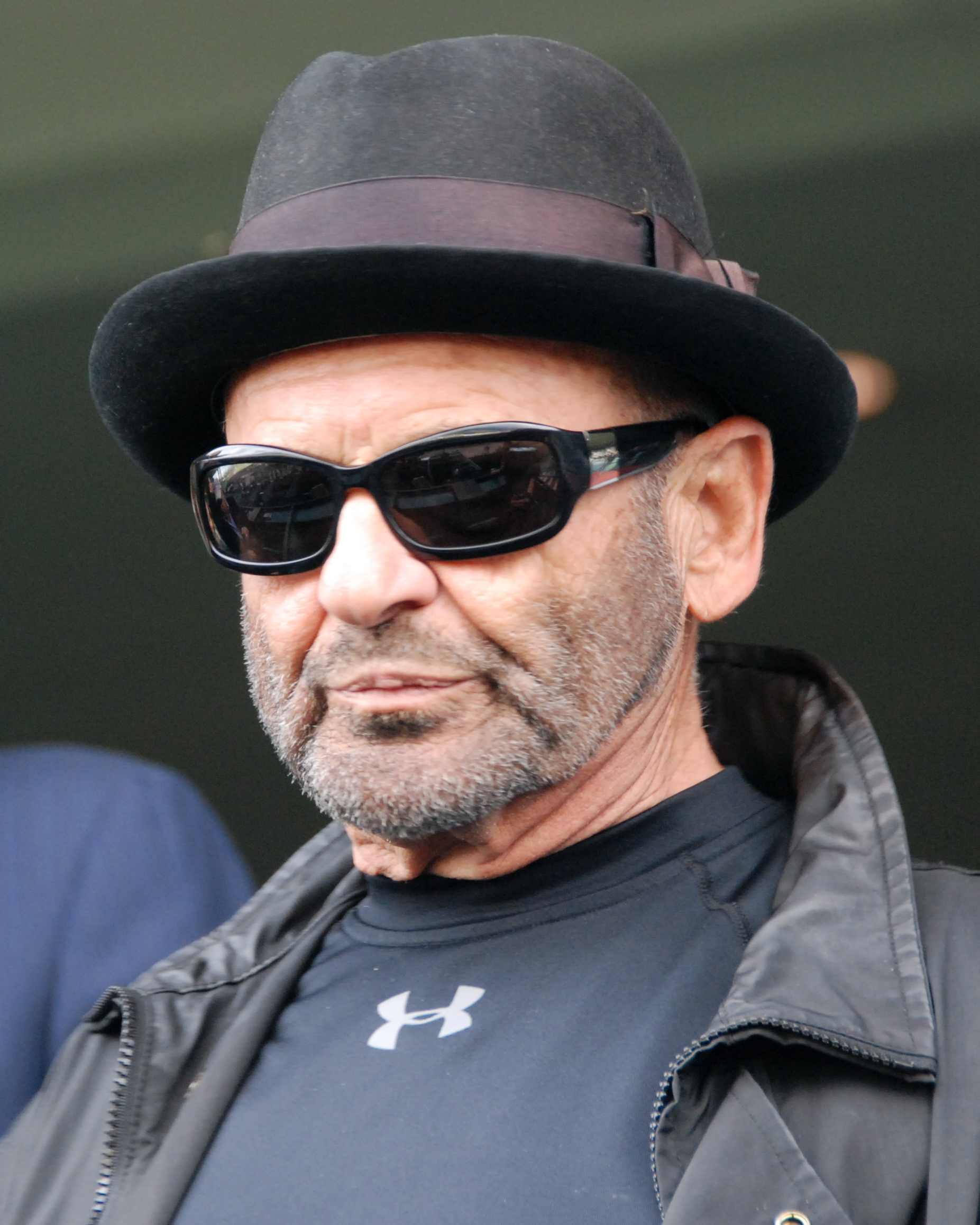
Joe Pesci

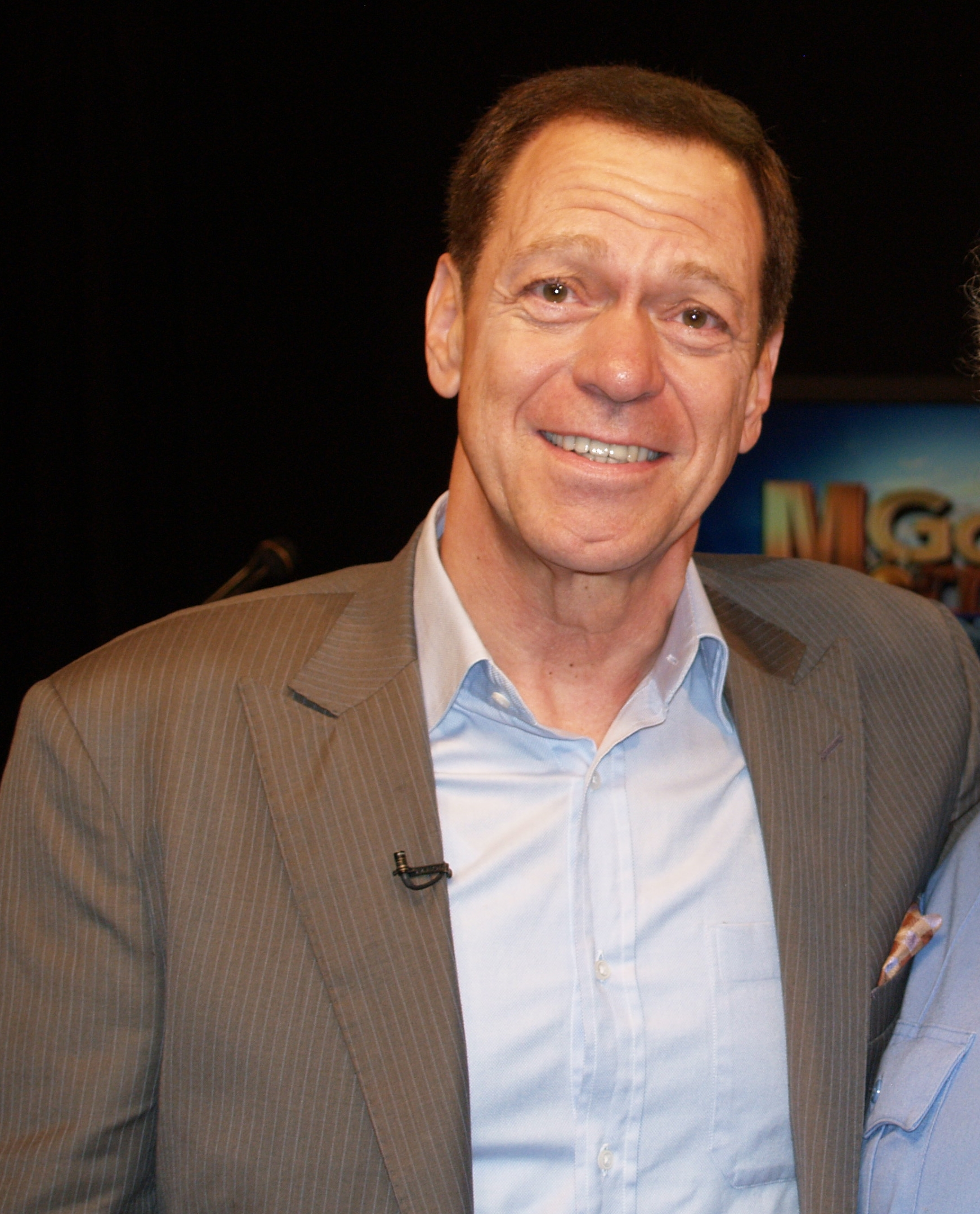
Joe Piscopo

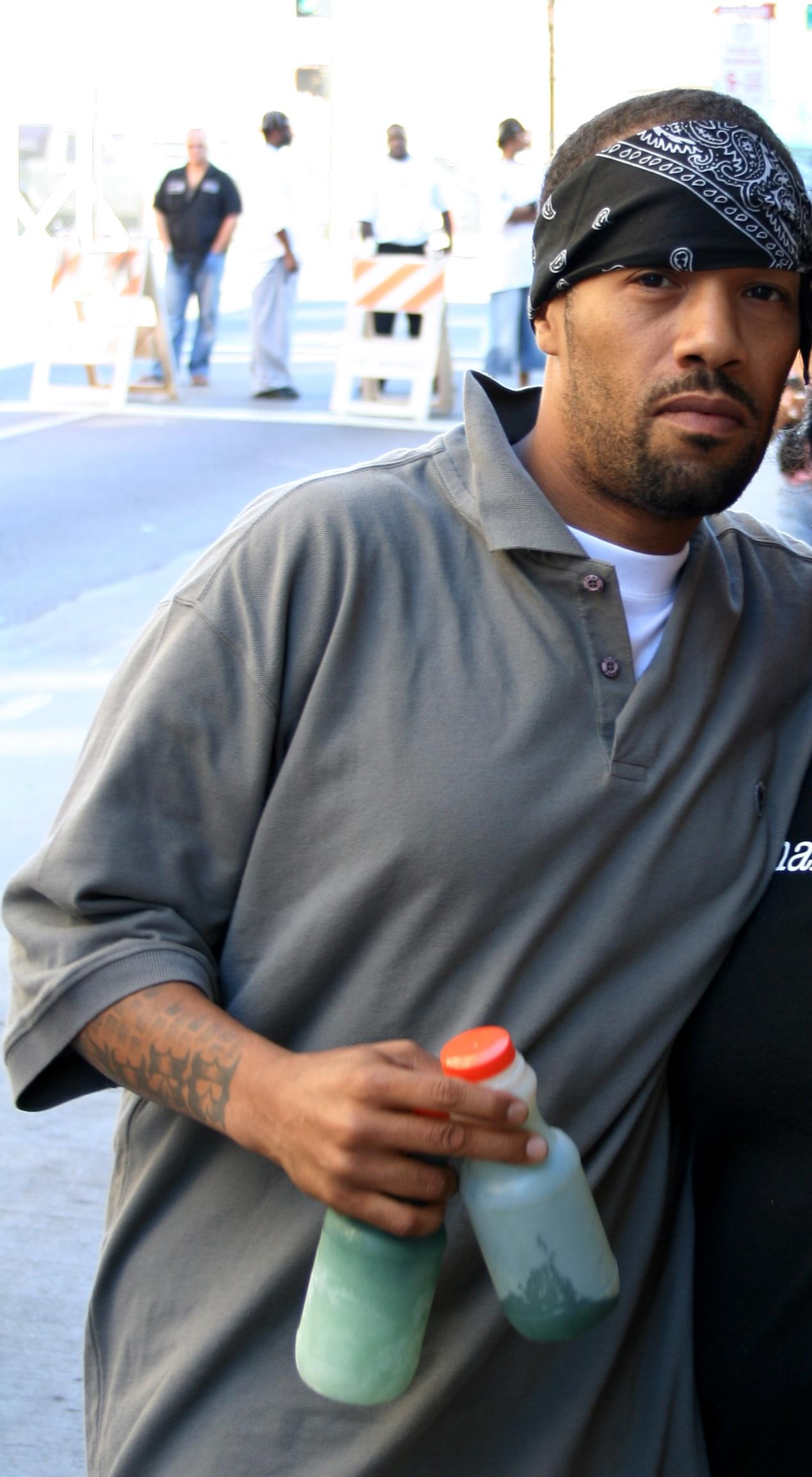
Redman

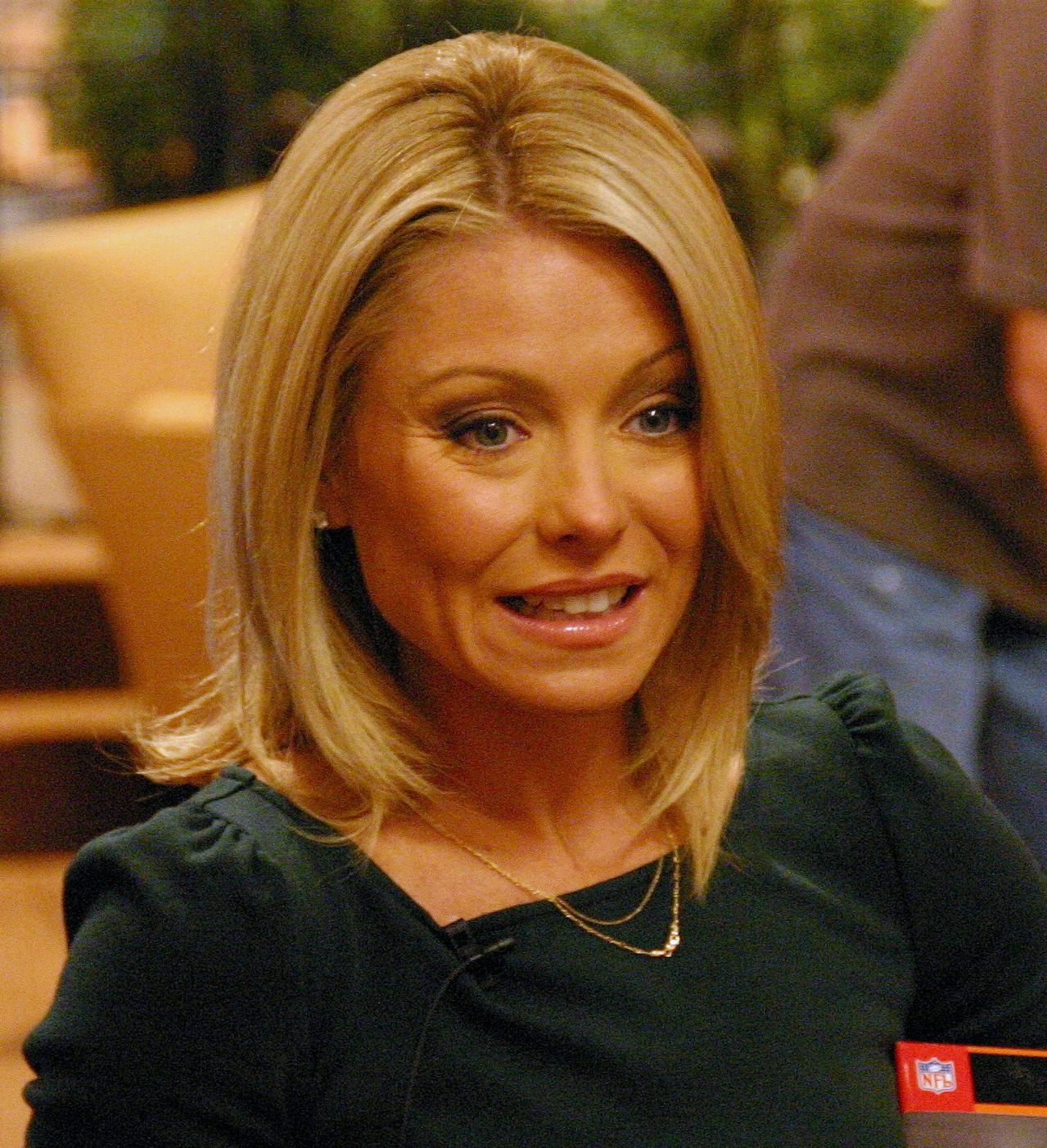
Kelly Ripa

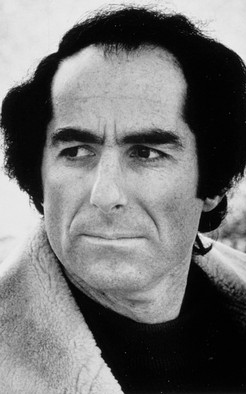
Philip Roth

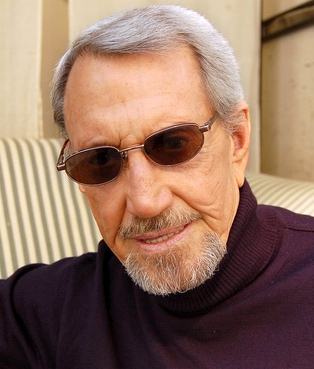
Roy Scheider

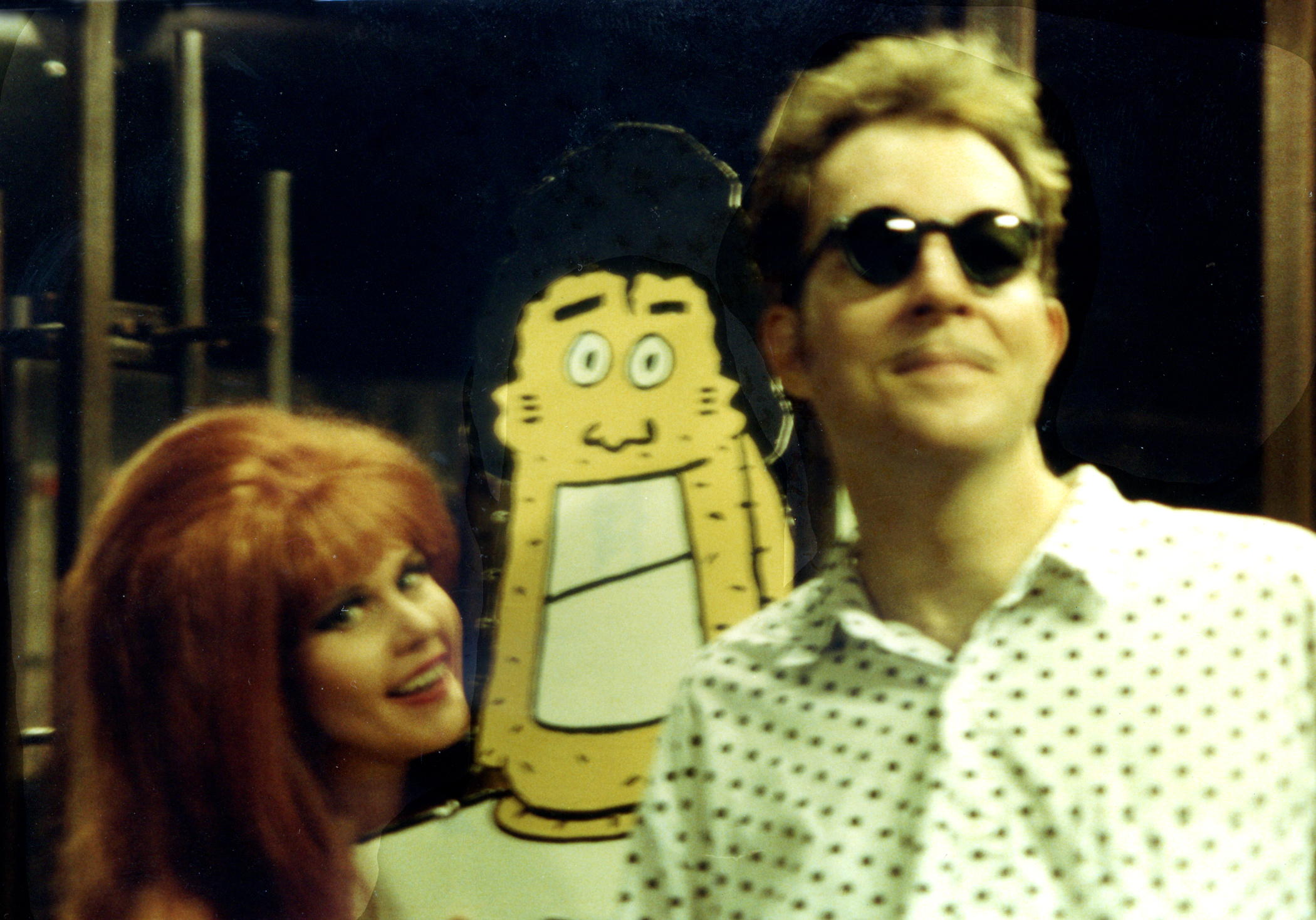
Kate Pierson and Fred Schneider

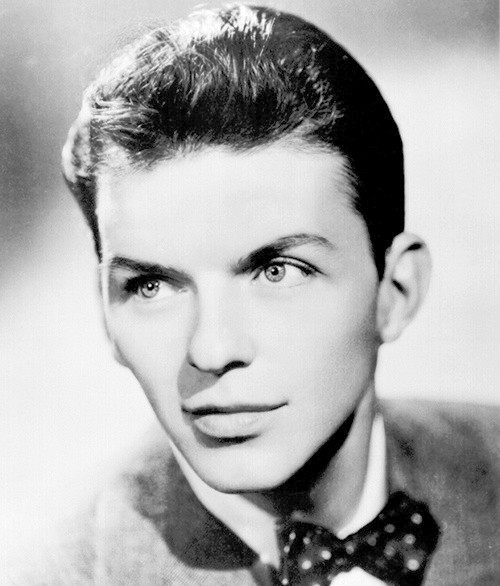
Frank Sinatra

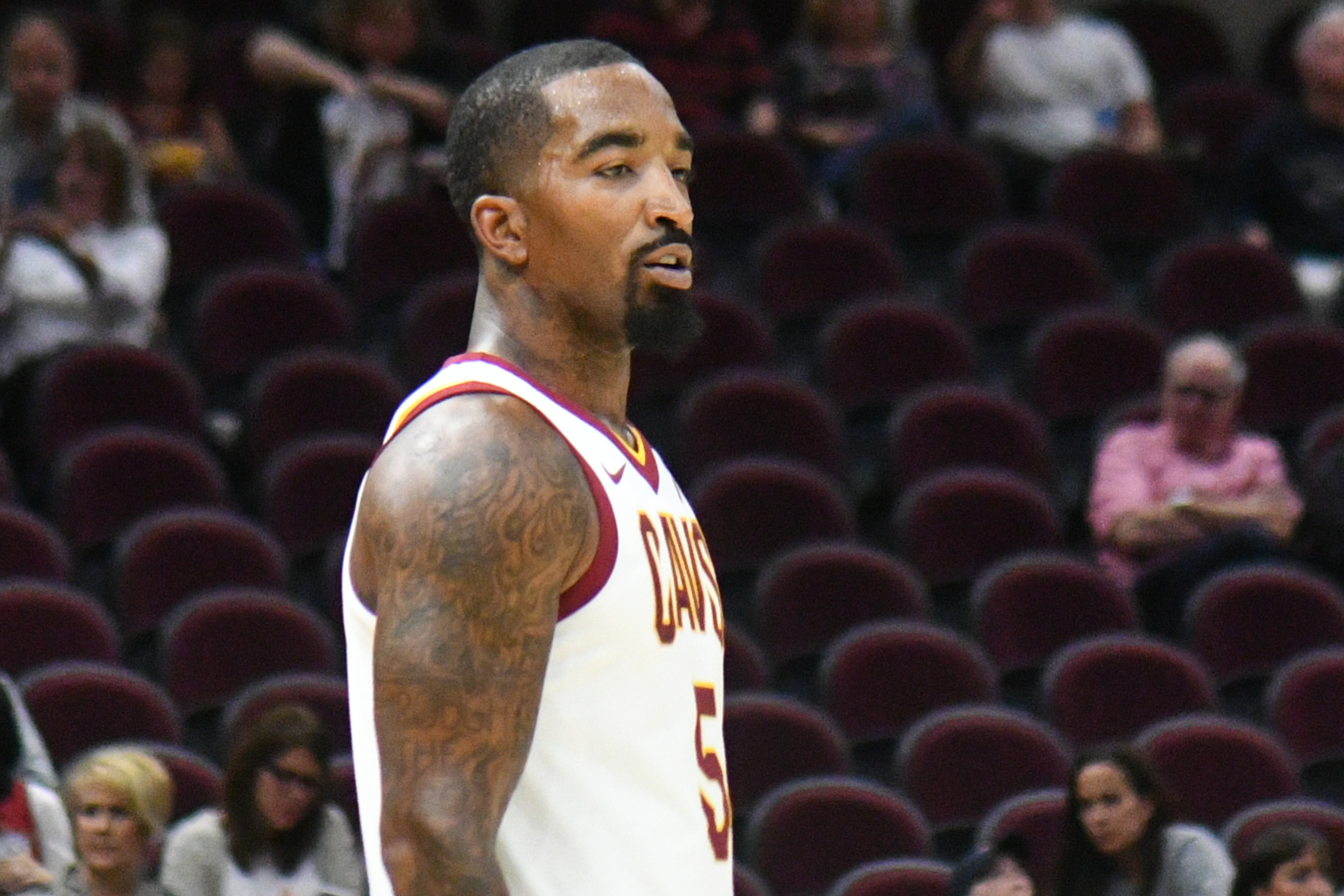
J. R. Smith

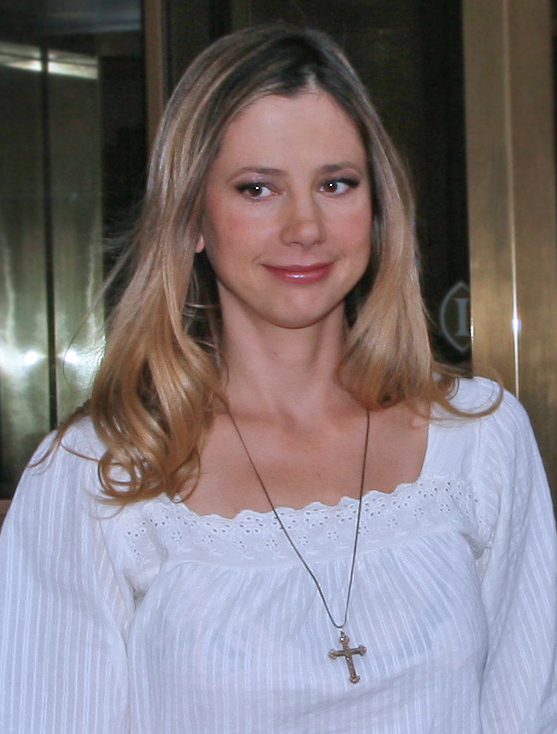
Mira Sorvino

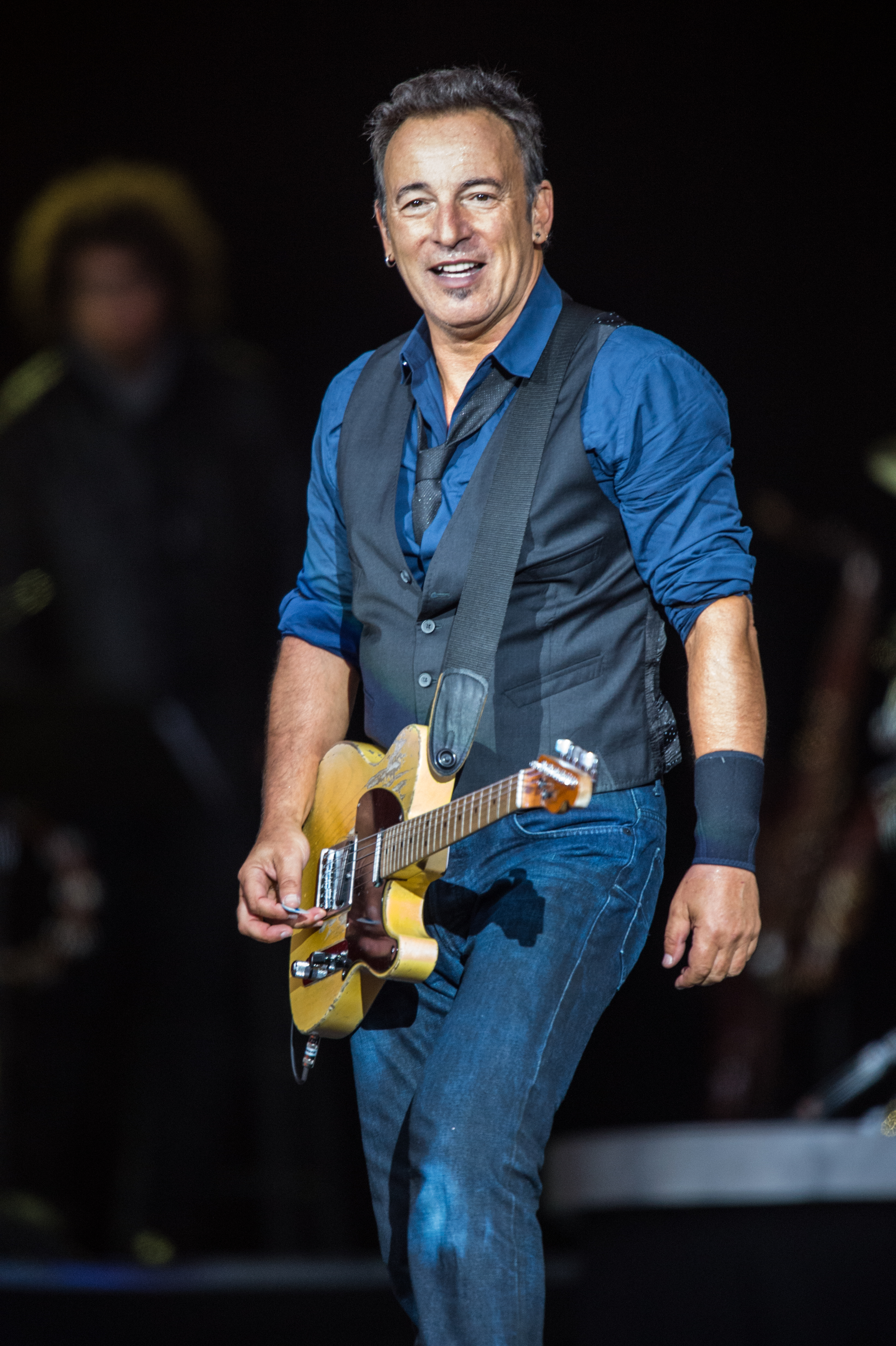
Bruce Springsteen

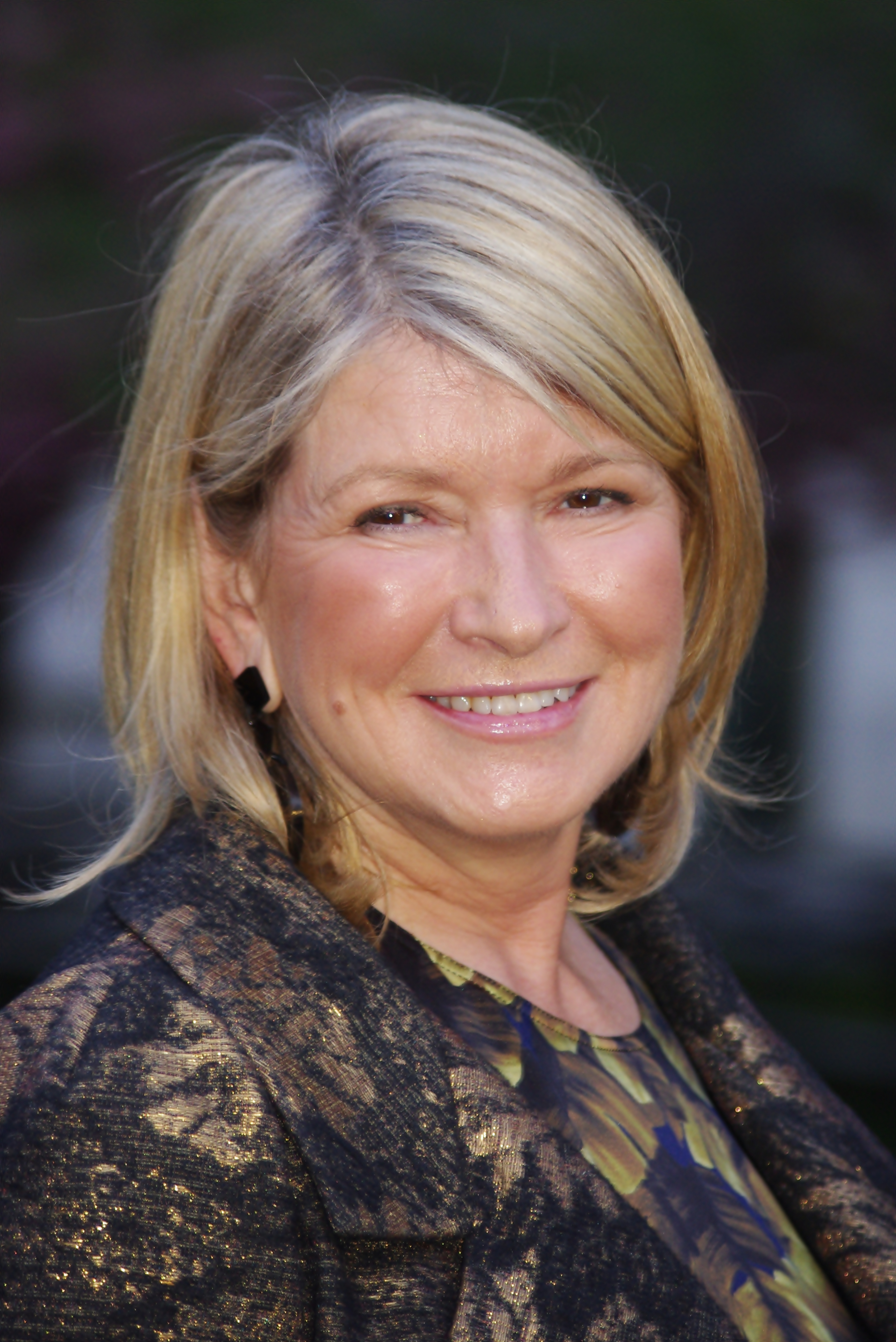
Martha Stewart

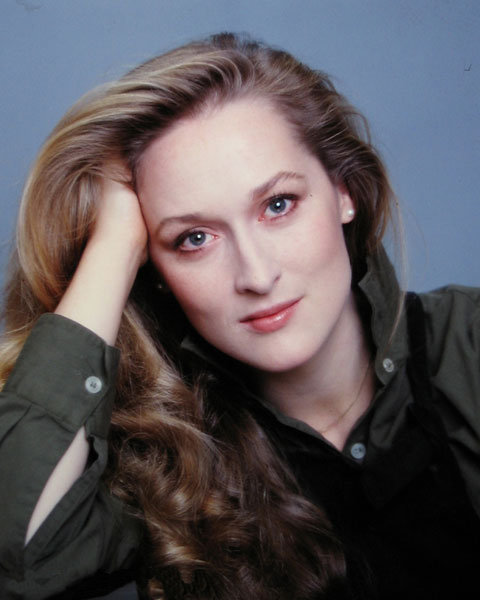
Meryl Streep

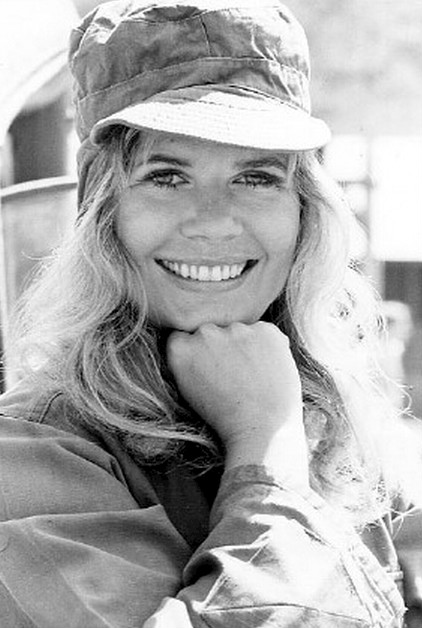
Loretta Swit

- Alice Gainer (born 1982), anchorwoman for WCBS-TV (Wayne)
- Natasha Gajewski, founder of Symple Health (Princeton)
- Tony Galento (1910–1979), heavyweight boxer and actor, On the Waterfront (Orange)
- James Gandolfini (1961–2013), actor, starred in The Sopranos (Park Ridge)
- Antonio Garay (born 1979), defensive tackle for the San Diego Chargers (Rahway)
- Allen Garfield (1939–2020), actor (Newark)
- Lee Garlington (born 1953), actress (Teaneck)
- David Garrison (born 1952), actor, Married... with Children, It's Your Move (Long Branch)
- Willie Garson (1964–2021), actor, Sex and the City (Highland Park)
- Bob Gaudio (born 1942), singer, songwriter, musician and record producer; keyboardist/backing vocalist for The Four Seasons
- Johnny Gaudreau (1993–2024), ice hockey left winger for the Calgary Flames (Salem)
- Gloria Gaynor (born 1949), singer (Newark)
- Michael V. Gazzo (1923–1995), playwright and actor, Frank Pentangeli in The Godfather Part II (Hillside)
- Brian Geraghty (born 1974), actor (Toms River)
- Michael Giacchino (born 1967), Oscar-winning composer (Riverside, raised in Edgewater Park)
- Ray Gillen (1959–1993), hard rock/heavy metal vocalist; founding member of Badlands, Sun Red Sun, and performed with Black Sabbath (born in New York City; raised in Cliffside Park)
- Elizabeth Gillies (born 1993), actress, singer, dancer (Haworth)
- Justin Gimelstob (born 1977), tennis player (Livingston)
- Samantha Ginn, actress and stage director
- Allen Ginsberg (1926–1997), poet (Paterson)
- Bob Giraldi (born 1939), film, TV and music video director (Paterson)
- Kid Gleason (1866–1933), baseball player (Camden)
- Savion Glover (born 1973), actor, tap dancer and choreographer (Newark)
- Judy Gold (born 1962), stand-up comic (Newark)
- Al Golden (born 1969), head football coach for the University of Miami (Colts Neck)
- Joshua Gomez (born 1975), actor, Chuck, Without a Trace (Bayonne)
- Rick Gomez (born 1972), actor, Band of Brothers (Bayonne)
- Frances Goodrich (1890–1984), screenwriter, It's a Wonderful Life, The Thin Man (Belleville)
- Hedwig Gorski (born 1949), poet
- Goose Goslin (1900–1971), Hall of Fame baseball infielder (Salem)
- Dwayne Gratz (born 1990), cornerback for the Jacksonville Jaguars (Piscataway)
- Kerri Green (born 1967), actress (Fort Lee)
- Bob Greene (born 1958), fitness guru, author (Cherry Hill)
- Khaseem Greene (born 1989), linebacker for the Chicago Bears (Elizabeth)
- Peter Greene (1965–2025), actor, Zed from Pulp Fiction (Montclair)
- Shonn Greene (born 1985), running back for the New York Jets (Sicklerville)
- Zach Grenier (born 1954), actor, Touching Evil (Englewood)
- Max Greyserman (born 1995), golfer on the PGA Tour (Millburn)
- Hezekiah Griggs, III (1988–2016), entrepreneur, philanthropist, investor
- Christina Grimmie (1994–2016), singer-songwriter, contestant on The Voice (Marlton)
- Robert Griswold (born 1996), swimmer
- Dan Grunfeld (born 1984), professional basketball player (Franklin Lakes)
- Tom Guiry (born 1981), actor, The Black Donnellys (Trenton)
- Alen Hadzic (born 1991), fencer, banned for life due to sexual misconduct (Paterson)
- Marvelous Marvin Hagler (1954–2021), boxer (Newark)
- Alison Haislip (born 1981), actress, Attack of the Show!, The Voice, Battleground (Tewksbury Township)
- Halsey (born 1994), singer-songwriter and actress (Edison)
- Rusty Hamer (1947–1990), child actor, Make Room for Daddy (Tenafly)
- David Hand (1900–1986), animator, director, Walt Disney Productions, Gaumont-British, Alexander Film Company (Plainfield)
- Chelsea Handler (born 1975), stand-up comedian, actress, host of Chelsea Lately (Livingston)
- Henry Janeway Hardenbergh (1847–1918), architect (New Brunswick)
- John Harkes (born 1967), soccer player (Kearny)
- Jess Harnell (born 1963), voice actor, Animaniacs, Up, the Transformers movies (Teaneck)
- Al Harrington (born 1980), player for the Orlando Magic (Orange)
- Ed Harris (born 1950), actor, Pollock, The Truman Show, The Right Stuff, Apollo 13, Game Change (born in Englewood, raised in Tenafly)
- Franco Harris (born 1950), Hall of Fame fullback with the Pittsburgh Steelers (Fort Dix)
- Roxanne Hart (born 1952), actress, Chicago Hope (Trenton)
- Dwayne Haskins (1997–2022), football player (Highland Park)
- Tobin Heath (born 1988), forward for the U.S. women's team and Portland Thorns (Morristown)
- Robert Hegyes (1951–2012), actor, Welcome Back, Kotter (Perth Amboy)
- Grace Helbig (born 1985), actress, comedian, Camp Takota (Woodbury, raised in Woodbury Heights)
- Mark Helias (born 1950), jazz musician (New Brunswick)
- Gerald Henderson Jr. (born 1987), shooting guard for the Charlotte Bobcats (Caldwell)
- Al Herpin (1862–1947), insomniac, the "Man Who Never Slept" (Trenton)
- Frank Herrmann (born 1984), relief pitcher for the Cleveland Indians (Rutherford)
- Robert Hess (1938–1994), president of Brooklyn College
- Jon-Erik Hexum (1957–1984), actor, model, Voyagers! (Englewood, raised in Tenafly)
- Richard X. Heyman (born 1951), singer-songwriter, musician, original member of The Doughboys (Plainfield)
- Shana Hiatt (born 1975), model, presenter (Tabernacle Township)
- Beatrice Hicks (1919–1979), engineer, co-founder, and first president of the Society of Women Engineers (Orange)
- Michele Hicks (born 1973), actress, Mara Vendrell on The Shield (Essex County)
- Brian Hill (born 1947), assistant coach for the Detroit Pistons (East Orange)
- Dulé Hill (born 1975), actor, Psych (East Brunswick, raised in Sayreville)
- Lauryn Hill (born 1975), singer, rapper, songwriter (South Orange)
- Mary G. Hill (1803–1884), first president of the Woman's Christian Temperance Union of Newark
- Garret Hobart (1844–1899), 24th vice president of the United States (Long Branch)
- Chris Hogan (born 1988), wide receiver for the New England Patriots (Wyckoff)
- Jesse Holley (born 1984), wide receiver for the Dallas Cowboys (Roselle)
- Richard Hooker (1924–1997), writer, surgeon, author of the novel MASH (Trenton)
- Jermaine 'Huggy' Hopkins (born 1973), actor (Newark)
- Neil Hopkins (born 1977), actor (Trenton)
- Wil Horneff (born 1979), actor (born in Englewood, raised in Saddle River)
- Dennis Horner (born 1988), forward for the Artland Dragons (Linwood)
- Adam "Ad-Rock" Horovitz (born 1966), member of the Beastie Boys (South Orange)
- Andrew Horowitz (born 1983), keyboardist of Tally Hall (Warren)
- Cissy Houston (1933–2024), singer (Newark)
- Whitney Houston (1963–2012), singer and actress (Newark, raised in East Orange)
- Tim Howard (born 1979), soccer player for Memphis 901, Everton (North Brunswick)
- Bobby Hurley (born 1971), college basketball coach and former professional player (Jersey City)
- Thomas Hutchins (1730–1789), military engineer, cartographer, geographer and surveyor (Monmouth County)
- Cassidy Hutchinson (born 1996), former White House aide, (Pennington)
- Paul Iacono (born 1988), actor, The Hard Times of RJ Berger (Secaucus)
- Frank Iero (born 1981), rhythm guitarist of My Chemical Romance (Belleville)
- Sonny Igoe (1923–2012), jazz and big band drummer (Jersey City)
- Mark Ingram II (born 1989), running back for the New Orleans Saints (Hackensack)
- Ryan Izzo (born 1995), tight end for the New England Patriots (Highland Lakes)
- Michael Jace (born 1965), actor,The Shield (Paterson)
- Leonard Jeffries (born 1937), controversial professor City University of New York (Newark)
- Malcolm Jenkins (born 1987), safety for the Philadelphia Eagles (East Orange)
- Rodney Jerkins (born 1977), songwriter, record producer, musician (Pleasantville)
- Dontae Johnson (born 1991), cornerback for the San Francisco 49ers (Pennington)
- Enoch "Nucky" Johnson (1883–1968), Atlantic City political boss and racketeer, basis for Boardwalk Empire's Nucky Thompson (Galloway Township)
- James P. Johnson (1894–1955), stride jazz pianist (New Brunswick)
- J. Seward Johnson Jr. (1930–2020), sculptor
- Leavander Johnson (1969–2005), world champion boxer (Atlantic City)
- Marsha P. Johnson (1945–1992), drag queen, gay liberation activist (Elizabeth)
- Robert Wood Johnson II (1893–1968), businessman, Chairman of the Board of Johnson & Johnson (New Brunswick)
- Soterios Johnson, host on public radio station WNYC (Highland Park)
- Frankie Jonas (born 2000), child actor, Jonas (Ridgewood)
- Kevin Jonas (born 1987), singer, guitarist, member of the Jonas Brothers (Teaneck, raised in Wyckoff)
- Dahntay Jones (born 1980), player for the Indiana Pacers (Trenton, raised in Hamilton Square)
- Donald Jones (born 1987), wide receiver for the Buffalo Bills (Plainfield)
- Keith Jones (born 1985), broadcaster (New Egypt)
- Linda Jones (1944–1972), soul singer (Newark)
- Maxine Jones (born 1965), singer (Paterson)
- Michael Jones (born 1987), voice actor, actor, YouTube personality (Woodbridge)
- Nate Jones (born 1982), NFL cornerback (Newark)
- Ben Jorgensen (born 1983), musician (Teaneck)
- Just Blaze (born 1978), rap musician (Paterson)
- Yaki Kadafi (1977–1996), rapper and member of Tupac Shakur's group Outlawz (Irvington)
- Jerome Kagan (1929–2021), pioneer in the field of developmental psychology (Newark)
- Herman Kahn (1922–1983), preeminent nuclear scientist of the 20th century from Bayonne
- Stanley Kamel (1943–2008), actor, Monk, Melrose Place (South River)
- Ira Kaplan (born 1957), musician, co-founder of Yo La Tengo (Hoboken)
- Myq Kaplan (born 1978), stand-up comedian (Livingston)
- Eric Karros (born 1967), MLB first baseman, TV color commentator for (Hackensack)
- Danny Kass (born 1982), pro snowboarder (Vernon Valley)
- Thomas Kean (born 1935), governor, 9/11 Commission chairman (Bedminster)
- Brian Keith (1921–1997), actor, The Parent Trap, Nevada Smith, Family Affair, The Wind and the Lion (Bayonne)
- Daniel Hugh Kelly (born 1952), actor (Elizabeth)
- Mark Kelly (born 1964), astronaut, husband of Congresswoman Gabby Giffords, twin brother of Scott Kelly (Orange)
- Scott Kelly (born 1964), astronaut, commander of International Space Station Expedition 26, twin brother of Mark Kelly (Orange)
- Victor J. Kemper (1927–2023), cinematographer (Newark)
- Stacey Kent (born 1965), singer (South Orange)
- Walter Kidde (1877–1943), founder of the Kidde company (Hoboken)
- Tom Kiesche (born 1967), actor (Hackensack)
- Jim Kiick (1946–2020), NFL running back, primarily for the Miami Dolphins (Lincoln Park)
- Victor Kilian (1891–1979), actor (Jersey City)
- Joyce Kilmer (1886–1918), poet (New Brunswick)
- Zalman King (1941–2012), actor, director, writer, Body Language (Trenton)
- Alfred Kinsey (1894–1956), zoologist and sexologist (Hoboken)
- Michael E. Knight (born 1959), actor (Princeton)
- Ann McLaughlin Korologos (born 1941), secretary of labor 1987–1989 (Chatham)
- Ernie Kovacs (1919–1962), comedian and actor (Trenton)
- Stephen Kovacs (1972–2022), saber fencer and fencing coach, charged with sexual assault, died in prison
- Dennis Kozlowski (born 1946), CEO of Tyco International, convicted in 2005 (Newark)
- Jane Krakowski (born 1969), actress, 30 Rock (Parsippany)
- Barbara Kruger (born 1945), conceptual artist (Newark)
- Larry Kudlow (born 1947), economist, TV personality, syndicated columnist (Englewood)
- Richard Kuklinski (1935–2006), murderer of over 100 people in mob-related instances (Jersey City)
- Jared Kushner (born 1981), senior advisor to President Donald Trump (Livingston)
- William Labov (1927–2024), linguist (Rutherford)
- Christian Lambertsen (1917–2011), environmental medicine and diving medicine specialist (Westfield)
- Nathan Lane (born 1956), actor in The Birdcage, The Producers and Tony, Emmy, Golden Globe-winner (Jersey City)
- Artie Lange (born 1967), actor, comedian, radio personality (Livingston, raised in Union)
- Frank Langella (born 1938), actor, Dracula, Superman Returns, Frost/Nixon, Draft Day (Bayonne)
- Jack Langer (born 1948/1949), basketball player and investment banker
- Mike Largey (born 1960), basketball player in the Israeli Basketball Premier League
- Tara LaRosa (born 1978), mixed martial artist (Woodstown)
- Ali Larter (born 1976), actress, Niki Sanders on Heroes (Cherry Hill)
- Vincent Larusso (born 1978), actor, The Mighty Ducks trilogy (Livingston)
- Jonathan Last (born 1974), author, senior writer at The Weekly Standard (born in Camden, raised in Woodbury and Moorestown)
- Tommy La Stella (born 1989), second baseman for the Chicago Cubs (Closter)
- Queen Latifah (born 1970), singer, actress, TV personality (Newark)
- Jack Lawless (born 1987), drummer of the Jonas Brothers (Middletown)
- Jacob Lawrence (1917–2000), artist (Atlantic City)
- Paul Le Mat (born 1946), actor, American Graffiti, Melvin and Howard (Rahway)
- Nicole Leach (born 1979), actress (Montclair)
- Fran Lebowitz (born 1950), author (Morristown)
- AJ Lee (born 1987), professional wrestler and author (Union City)
- Beverly Lee (born 1941), singer with The Shirelles (Passaic)
- Al Leiter (born 1965), MLB starting pitcher, TV commentator (Toms River)
- Stephanie Lemelin (born 1979), actress, Young Justice (Sewell)
- Arthur Lenk (born 1964), Israeli diplomat (Paterson)
- Robert Sean Leonard (born 1969), actor, House, Dead Poets Society (born in Westwood, raised in Ridgewood)
- Michael Lerner (born 1943), left-wing activist and rabbi (Newark)
- Bunny Levine (1928–2026), actress, (East Orange)
- Jerry Levine (born 1957), actor, director, Going Places, Will & Grace (New Brunswick)
- Diane Lewis (c. 1953–2007), journalist East Orange)
- Jerry Lewis (1926–2017), actor, comedian, director, telethon host, Academy Award honoree (Newark)
- Bob Ley (born 1955), ESPN sports anchor (Newark)
- Judith Light (born 1949), actress, Emmy winner, Who's the Boss?, Ugly Betty, Law & Order: SVU (Trenton)
- Damon Lindelof (born 1973), television and film producer, Lost, Crossing Jordan, Star Trek (Teaneck)
- Ray Liotta (1955–2022), actor, Goodfellas, The Rat Pack, Cop Land, Hannibal (born in Newark, raised in Union Township)
- Sean Lissemore (born 1987), defensive end for the Dallas Cowboys (Teaneck)
- Carli Lloyd (born 1982), Soccer Player, two-time FIFA Women World Player of the Year, two-time Olympic gold medalist, FIFA Women's World Cup gold and silver medalist, plays for the United States women's national soccer team (Delran Township)
- Norman Lloyd (1914–2021), actor, director, producer, St. Elsewhere (Jersey City)
- Amy Locane (born 1971), actress (Trenton)
- Kurt Loder (born 1945), film critic, author, columnist, TV personality (Ocean City)
- Jim Lord (born 1948), singer-songwriter (Jersey City)
- Faizon Love (born 1968), actor (Newark)
- Derek Luke (born 1974), actor (Jersey City)
- Martha MacCallum (born 1964), news anchor for the Fox News Channel (Wyckoff)
- Bob MacDonald (born 1965), MLB pitcher (East Orange)
- Elliott Maddox (born 1947), MLB player (East Orange)
- Leonard Maltin (born 1950), film critic, film historian, author (Teaneck)
- Steve Maneri (born 1988), tight end for the Chicago Bears (Saddle Brook)
- Greg Mankiw (born 1958), macroeconomist and chairman of the Council of Economic Advisers under President George W. Bush (Trenton)
- David Marciano (born 1960), actor (Newark)
- Bernie Marcus (1929–2024), founder and first CEO of The Home Depot (Newark)
- Lisa Marie (born 1968), model and actress (Piscataway)
- John Marin (1870–1953), artist (Rutherford)
- Robert Markowitz (born 1935), film and TV director (Irvington)
- Marc Maron (born 1963), stand-up comedian (Jersey City)
- George R. R. Martin (born 1948), novelist, short story writer, author of A Song of Ice and Fire (Bayonne)
- Soraida Martinez (born 1956), artist, designer and social activist known for creating the art style of Verdadism
- Nick Massi (1927–2000), bass singer and bass guitarist for The Four Seasons (Newark)
- Terry Matalas (born 1975), television writer, director, executive producer
- Ronald F. Maxwell (born 1949), film director, screenwriter (Clifton)
- Vin Mazzaro (born 1986), relief pitcher for the Pittsburgh Pirates (Hackensack, raised in Rutherford)
- Matt McAndrew (born 1990), singer-songwriter, contestant from The Voice season 7 (Barnegat Light)
- Turk McBride (born 1985), defensive end for the New Orleans Saints (Camden)
- Andrew McCarthy (born 1962), actor, Less than Zero, Pretty in Pink, Weekend at Bernie's (Westfield)
- Beth McCarthy-Miller (born 1963), TV director, Saturday Night Live, 30 Rock, The Marriage Ref (Elizabeth)
- Tom McCarthy (born 1966), actor, writer, director, Scott Templeton on The Wire (New Providence)
- Heather McComb (born 1977), actor, Profiler, Party of Five (Barnegat Township)
- Mary McCormack (born 1969), actress, In Plain Sight, The West Wing, Murder One (Plainfield)
- Warren Sturgis McCulloch (1898–1969), neurophysiologist and cybernetician (Orange)
- Markis McDuffie (born 1997), professional basketball player for Maccabi Ashdod of the Israeli Basketball Premier League (Paterson)
- Don McGahn (born 1968), White House counsel to President Donald Trump (Atlantic City)
- Tom McGowan (born 1959), actor, Frasier, Down the Shore, Everybody Loves Raymond (Belmar)
- Kareem McKenzie (born 1979), former offensive tackle for the New York Giants (Trenton)
- Bryant McKinnie (born 1979), offensive tackle for the Baltimore Ravens (Woodbury)
- Sydney McLaughlin-Levrone (born 1999), American hurdler and sprinter, four-time Olympic gold medalist (Dunellen)
- Christopher McQuarrie (born 1968), Academy Award-winning screenwriter, director (Princeton Junction)
- Joe Medwick (1911–1975), Hall of Fame baseball player (Carteret)
- George Mehnert (1881–1948), freestyle wrestler, two-time Olympic gold medalist (Newark)
- Tony Meola (born 1969), soccer player (Kearny)
- Lee Meredith (born 1947), actress, The Producers (River Edge)
- Frank Messina (born 1968), poet
- Otto Messmer (1892–1983), animator, co-created Felix the Cat (Union City)
- Jason Mewes (born 1974), actor, Clerks, Mallrats, Chasing Amy, Dogma (Highlands)
- Dan Meyer (born 1981), relief pitcher for the Pittsburgh Pirates (Woodbury)
- Jeromy Miles (born 1987), safety for the Baltimore Ravens (Voorhees)
- Cristin Milioti (born 1985), actress, How I Met Your Mother, Fargo, The Wolf of Wall Street (Cherry Hill)
- Bea Miller (born 1999), singer (Maplewood)
- E. Spencer Miller (1817–1879), Dean of the University of Pennsylvania Law School (Princeton)
- Ezra Miller (born 1992), actor (Wyckoff)
- John Milnor (born 1931), mathematician, notable in the fields of exotic spheres and mathematical economics (Orange)
- Kelly Jo Minter (born 1966), actress (Trenton)
- Susan Misner (born 1971), actress (Paterson, raised in Pequannock Township)
- Dorian Missick (born 1976), actor (East Orange)
- Thomas Mitchell (1892–1962), Oscar-winning actor (Elizabeth)
- Jay Mohr (born 1970), actor, comedian, radio personality (Verona)
- Frank Molinaro (born 1988), freestyle wrestler for Team USA, NCAA Division I champion (Middletown)
- Steve Monarque (born 1959), actor, Friday the 13th: The Series (Pompton Lakes)
- Raymond Rocco Monto (born 1960), orthopedic surgeon, researcher (Newark])
- Eugene Monroe (born 1987), offensive tackle for the Baltimore Ravens (Plainfield)
- John J. Mooney (1930–2020), chemical engineer, co-inventor of the three-way catalytic converter (Paterson)
- Trevor Moore (1980–2021), actor, comedian, writer, The Whitest Kids U' Know (Montclair)
- Knowshon Moreno (born 1987), professional football player (Middletown Township)
- Brit Morgan (born 1987), actress, True Blood, The Middleman (Marlton)
- Liv Morgan (born 1994), WWE wrestler (Elmwood Park)
- Dezman Moses (born 1989), linebacker for the Kansas City Chiefs (Willingboro)
- Kevin Mulvey (born 1985), MLB starting pitcher (Parlin)
- Xavier Munford (born 1992), basketball player for Hapoel Tel Aviv of the Israeli Basketball Premier League
- Frankie Muniz (born 1985), actor, Malcolm in the Middle (Wood-Ridge)
- Ed Murawinski (born 1951), artist, New York Daily News (Jersey City)
- Eric Murdock (born 1968), professional basketball player (Somerville)
- Joseph S. Murphy (1933–1998), president of Queens College, president of Bennington College, and chancellor of the City University of New York
- Troy Murphy (born 1980), power forward and center for the Los Angeles Lakers (Morristown)
- Tom Murro (born 1966), journalist, columnist, TV personality (Franklin Lakes)
- Ira B. Nadel (born 1943), biographer, literary critic
- Vince Naimoli (1937–2019), owner of the Tampa Bay Rays (Paterson)
- Andrew Napolitano (born 1950), Fox News Channel analyst, author, talk radio host (Newark)
- Naturi Naughton (born 1984), singer and actress (East Orange)
- Ozzie Nelson (1906–1975), actor, bandleader and TV personality (born in Jersey City, raised in Ridgefield Park)
- Quenton Nelson (born 1996), NFL offensive lineman (Holmdel)
- Ricky Nelson (1940–1985), singer and actor (Teaneck)
- Randy Neumann (born 1948), boxer and referee (Cliffside Park)
- Bebe Neuwirth (born 1958), Tony-winning actress (Princeton)
- David Newsom (born 1962), actor, photographer, Homefront (North Caldwell)
- Rebecca S. Nichols (1819–1903), poet (Greenwich)
- Jack Nicholson (born 1937), Oscar-winning actor (Neptune City)
- Kathleen Noone (born 1945), Emmy-winning actress, Sunset Beach, Knots Landing, All My Children (Hillsdale)
- Jeffrey Nordling (born 1962), actor, Once and Again, 24, Dirt (born in Ridgewood, raised in Washington Township)
- Jim Norton (born 1968), comedian, radio personality, actor, author (Bayonne)
- Joseph Nye (1937–2025), international relations scholar and co-founder of the neoliberalism school of thought (South Orange)
- Liam O'Brien (born 1976), voice actor, Monster, Ghost in the Shell (Weehawken)
- Daniel Och (born 1961), chairman and CEO of Och-Ziff Capital Management Group (Maplewood)
- Jodi Lyn O'Keefe (born 1978), actress (Cliffwood Beach)
- Criss Oliva (1963–1993), lead guitarist for metal band Savatage (Pompton Plains)
- Greg Olsen (born 1985), tight end for the Carolina Panthers (Wayne)
- T. J. O'Malley (1915–2009), aerospace engineer (Montclair)
- Henry O'Neill (1891–1961), actor (Orange)
- Jerry Only (born 1959), musician, bassist for The Misfits (Lodi)
- Peter Onorati (born 1954), actor, Civil Wars, Joe's Life, Cop Rock (Boonton)
- Heather O'Reilly (born 1985), three-time Olympic gold medalist and professional soccer player (East Brunswick)
- Claudette Ortiz (born 1981), R&B and hip-hop singer (Willingboro)
- David Packer (born 1962), actor (Passaic)
- Diamond Dallas Page (born 1956), professional wrestler (Point Pleasant)
- John Panelli (1926–2012), NFL linebacker and running back (Morristown)
- Franklin Pangborn (1889–1958), character actor (Newark)
- Joe Pantoliano (born 1951), actor, The Matrix, Memento, The Fugitive, Bound, The Sopranos (Hoboken)
- Tom Papa (born 1968), comedian, actor, and writer (Passaic, raised in Woodcliff Lake)
- Bill Parcells (born 1941), NFL coach and Hall of Famer, TV commentator (Englewood)
- Robert Pastorelli (1954–2004), actor, Murphy Brown, Cracker, Eraser (New Brunswick)
- Alice Paul (1885–1977), suffragist (Mount Laurel)
- Elizabeth Peña (1959–2014), actress, The Incredibles, Rush Hour (Elizabeth)
- Irving Penn (1917–2009), photographer (Plainfield)
- Kal Penn (born 1977), actor (Montclair)
- Caroline Pennell (born 1996), singer-songwriter, contestant from The Voice season 5 (Saddle River)
- Jabrill Peppers (born 1995), strong safety and return specialist for the New York Giants (East Orange)
- Fernando Perez (born 1983), former MLB outfielder, baseball analyst for MLB.com (Elizabeth, raised in West Windsor)
- Millie Perkins (born 1936), actress (Passaic, raised in Fair Lawn)
- Jim Perry (1933–2015), U.S. and Canadian game show host (Camden)
- Joe Pesci (born 1943), Oscar-winning actor, Goodfellas, Raging Bull, Casino, JFK, Home Alone (Newark)
- Ralph Peterson Jr. (1962–2021), jazz drummer and bandleader (Pleasantville)
- Thomas R. Pickering (born 1931), diplomat (Orange)
- Kenny Pickett (born 1998), NFL football player (Ocean Township)
- Kate Pierson (born 1948), singer, founding member of the B-52s (Weehawken, raised in Rutherford)
- Jimmy Pinchak (born 1996), teen actor, Family Affair (Point Pleasant)
- Hasan Piker (born 1991) left-wing political commentator and Twitch streamer (New Brunswick)
- Gregory Pincus (1903–1967), biologist and researcher who co-invented the combined oral contraceptive pill (Woodbine)
- Danny Pintauro (born 1976), actor, Who's the Boss? (Milltown)
- Joe Piscopo (born 1951), actor and comedian, Saturday Night Live, Wise Guys, 100 Deeds for Eddie McDowd (Passaic)
- Mahlon Pitney (1858–1924), U.S. Supreme Court justice (Morristown)
- Michael Pitt (born 1981), actor, Dawson's Creek, Boardwalk Empire, The Village (West Orange)
- Michael J. Pollard (1939–2019), actor, Bonnie and Clyde (Passaic)
- Rick Porcello (born 1988), starting pitcher for the Boston Red Sox (Morristown)
- Laura Prepon (born 1980), actress (Watchung)
- Molly Price (born 1966), actress (North Plainfield)
- Donny Pritzlaff (born 1979), freestyle and folkstyle wrestler, World medalist, two-time NCAA Division I champion (Lyndhurst)
- Lou Taylor Pucci (born 1985), actor (Seaside Heights, raised in Keansburg)
- Keshia Knight Pulliam (born 1979), actress, The Cosby Show (Newark)
- Charlie Puth (born 1991), singer (Rumson)
- Matthew Quick (born 1973), author of young adult and fiction novels (Oaklyn)
- Phil Radford (born 1976), Greenpeace Executive Director (New Brunswick)
- Rah Digga (born 1970), rap musician (Newark)
- Ronald T. Raines (born 1958), scientist, educator, and entrepreneur (Montclair)
- Bill Raisch (1905–1984), actor, One-Armed Man on The Fugitive (North Bergen)
- Anthony Ranaudo (born 1989), pitcher for the Texas Rangers (Freehold Township)
- Melissa Rauch (born 1980), actress, comedian, Bernadette Rostenkowski on The Big Bang Theory (Marlboro)
- Nate Ravitz (born 1987), radio personality, Fantasy Focus (Brick)
- Redman (born 1970), rap musician (Newark)
- Isaac Redman (born 1984), running back for the Pittsburgh Steelers (Paulsboro)
- Melissa Reeves (born 1967), soap opera actress, Days of Our Lives, Santa Barbara (Eatontown)
- Tara Reid (born 1975), actress, American Pie, American Pie 2, American Reunion (Wyckoff)
- Juliette Reilly (born 1993), singer-songwriter and YouTuber (Berkeley Heights)
- Claudio Reyna (born 1973), soccer player (Livingston)
- Herb Rich (1928–2008), two-time All-Pro NFL football player
- Nelson Riddle (1921–1985), arranger, composer, bandleader and orchestrator (Oradell, raised in Ridgewood)
- Jim Ringo (1931–2007), NFL Hall of Fame center and head coach (Orange)
- Kelly Ripa (born 1970), actress and television personality (Berlin)
- Paul Robeson (1898–1976), singer, actor, Civil Rights Movement activist (Princeton)
- Buddy Rogers (1921–1992), pro wrestler and the first ever WWE champion (Camden)
- Emma Winner Rogers (1855–1922), writer, suffragist (Plainfield)
- Seth Roland (born 1957), soccer player and coach
- James Rolfe (born 1980), filmmaker and internet personality, star and creator of the Angry Video Game Nerd web series (Haddonfield)
- Danielle Rose Russell (born 1999), actress, Hope Mikaelson in Legacies (Pequannock, raised in West Milford)
- Alan Rosenberg (born 1950), actor, Cybill, The Guardian, Civil Wars (Passaic)
- Jeff Ross (born 1965), comedian (Springfield)
- Wilbur Ross (born 1937), U.S. secretary of commerce under President Donald Trump (Weehawken)
- Giuseppe Rossi (born 1987), soccer player (Teaneck)
- Philip Roth (1933–2018), author (Newark)
- Joan Roughgarden (born 1946), ecologist and evolutionary biologist (Paterson)
- Richard Ruccolo (born 1972), actor, Two Guys and a Girl, Rita Rocks (Marlton)
- Mark Rudd (born 1947), left-wing activist, founding member of the Weather Underground (Maplewood)
- Tom Ruegger (born 1956), producer, creator of The Animaniacs (Metuchen)
- Deborah Rush (born 1954), actress, Strangers with Candy, Family Business, You've Got Mail (Chatham)
- Bob Ryan (born 1946), sportswriter (Trenton)
- Bobby Ryan (born 1987), ice hockey winger for the Ottawa Senators (Cherry Hill)
- Logan Ryan (born 1991), cornerback for the New England Patriots (Berlin)
- Dave Sabo (born 1964), nicknamed The Snake, professional guitar player, most notably as a founding member of Skid Row; early member of Bon Jovi before they achieved global fame (Perth Amboy)
- Peter Sagal (born 1965), NPR host (born and raised in Berkeley Heights)
- Katie Sagona (born 1989), actress (Westwood)
- Eva Marie Saint (born 1924), Academy Award-winning actress (Newark)
- Richie Sambora (born 1959), guitarist for rock band Bon Jovi (Perth Amboy, raised in Woodbridge Township)
- Ajai Sanders (born 1967), actress, A Different World (Trenton)
- Laura San Giacomo (born 1962), actress, Just Shoot Me! (Denville)
- Caitlin Sanchez (born 1996), actress (Englewood)
- Hector Santiago (born 1987), pitcher for the Los Angeles Angels (Newark)
- Mohamed Sanu (born 1989), wide receiver for the Atlanta Falcons (Sayreville, raised in Dayton)
- Dick Savitt (1927–2023), tennis player, ranked No. 2 in the world in 1951 (Bayonne)
- Natalie Schafer (1900–1991), actress, Mrs. Howell on Gilligan's Island (Red Bank)
- Tom Scharpling (born 1969), comedian (Dunellen)
- Dore Schary (1905–1980), film screenwriter and producer (Newark)
- Roy Scheider (1932–2008), actor, Jaws, The French Connection, All That Jazz (Orange)
- Greg Schiano (born 1966), head coach Tampa Bay Buccaneers, former head football coach Rutgers University (Wyckoff)
- Wally Schirra (1923–2007), Navy officer and test pilot (Hackensack)
- Sarah Schkeeper (born 1981), guard for the New York Sharks (Livingston)
- Steve Schmidt (born 1970), campaign strategist and advisor to the 2008 presidential campaign of Senator John McCain (North Plainfield)
- Fred Schneider (born 1951), frontman of the B-52s (Newark, raised in Long Branch)
- Scott Schoeneweis (born 1973), former MLB relief pitcher (Long Branch, raised in Mount Laurel)
- Frank D. Schroth (1884–1974), publisher of the Brooklyn Eagle (Trenton)
- Thomas N. Schroth (1920–2009), journalist, specializing in Inside the Beltway politics (Trenton)
- Norton Schwartz (born 1951), US Air Force general and chief of staff of the United States Air Force (Toms River)
- Sherwood Schwartz (1916–2011), television producer (Passaic)
- Norman Schwarzkopf Jr. (1934–2012), U.S. general, led coalition forces in the Gulf War (Trenton)
- Rusty Schweickart (born 1935), aeronautical engineer, NASA astronaut, research scientist (Neptune)
- Patti Scialfa (born 1953), singer-songwriter, musician, member of the E Street Band (Deal)
- Debralee Scott (1953–2005), actress, Angie (Elizabeth)
- Doc Searls (born 1947), journalist, columnist, blogger, author (Jersey City)
- Bruce Seldon (born 1967), boxer (Atlantic City)
- Henry Selick (born 1952), stop motion director, producer, writer, The Nightmare Before Christmas, James and the Giant Peach, Coraline (Glen Ridge, raised in Rumson)
- Ivan Sergei (born 1971), actor, Jack & Jill, Once a Thief, Crossing Jordan (Hawthorne)
- Matt Servitto (born 1965), actor, Agent Harris on The Sopranos (Teaneck)
- Marc Shaiman (born 1959), composer, lyricist, arranger, and performer (Newark)
- Christian Sharps (1810–1874), inventor of first successful breech-loading rifle (Washington)
- Ed Shaughnessy (1929–2013), swing and bebop drummer best known for his 29 years on The Tonight Show Starring Johnny Carson (Jersey City)
- Duncan Sheik (born 1969), singer-songwriter and composer (Montclair)
- Quinn Shephard (born 1995), actress and filmmaker (Metuchen)
- Cindy Sherman (born 1954), artist and photographer (Glen Ridge)
- Jonathan Marc Sherman (born 1968), playwright (Morristown, raised in Livingston)
- Sheetal Sheth (born 1976), actress (Phillipsburg)
- Armin Shimerman (born 1949), actor, Star Trek: DS9, Buffy the Vampire Slayer, Beauty and the Beast (Lakewood)
- Everett Shinn (1876–1953), artist (Woodstown)
- David K. Shipler (born 1942), author (Chatham)
- The Shirelles, iconic and seminal girl group of the 1960s and 1970s (Passaic)
- Joseph Shivers (1920–2014), textile chemist (Marlton)
- Michael Showalter (born 1970), actor/comedian (Princeton)
- Joel Silver (born 1952), film and television producer, the Matrix Trilogy, the Lethal Weapon movies, Die Hard, Predator (South Orange)
- Bill Simon (born 1951), businessman, California politician (Neptune Township)
- Jimmi Simpson (born 1975), actor, House of Cards, Westworld, Date Night (Hackettstown)
- Frank Sinatra (1915–1998), iconic singer and Academy Award-winning actor (Hoboken)
- Frank Sinatra Jr. (1944–2016), singer, songwriter, conductor (Jersey City)
- Nancy Sinatra (born 1940), singer, actress (Jersey City)
- Tony Siragusa (born 1967), football player and TV commentator (Kenilworth)
- Jeremy Slate (1926–2006), actor (Atlantic City)
- Devin Smeltzer (born 1995), starting pitcher for the Minnesota Twins (Voorhees)
- Jennifer Schwalbach Smith (born 1971), actress (Newark)
- J. R. Smith (born 1985), shooting guard for the New York Knicks (Freehold)
- Kevin Smith (born 1970), filmmaker, Clerks, Dogma, Red State (Highlands)
- Tasha Smith (born 1971), actress, Boston Common, Tyler Perry's For Better or Worse (Camden)
- Chris Snee (born 1982), guard for the New York Giants (Edison)
- Jason Snelling (born 1983), running back for the Atlanta Falcons (Toms River)
- Todd Solondz (born 1959), filmmaker (Newark)
- Soraya (1969–2006), singer-songwriter (Point Pleasant)
- Mira Sorvino (born 1967), Oscar-winning actress (Tenafly)
- Arthur Space (1908–1983), actor, Lassie (New Brunswick)
- Charles Speziale (1948–1999), scientist who had worked in Langley Research Center (Newark)
- Bruce Springsteen (born 1949), iconic singer-songwriter (Long Branch, raised in Freehold)
- Pamela Springsteen (born 1962), actress and photographer (Freehold)
- Amos Alonzo Stagg (1862–1965), athlete and pioneering college coach in multiple sports, primarily football (West Orange)
- Cody Stashak (born 1994), relief pitcher for the Minnesota Twins (Somers Point)
- Mark Stein (born 1947), rock musician, composer, and arranger (Bayonne)
- Victor J. Stenger (1935–2014), particle physicist, atheist, author (Bayonne)
- Mindy Sterling (born 1953), actress, Frau Farbissina in the Austin Powers movies (Paterson)
- Robert Sternberg (born 1949), psychologist and psychometrician (Newark)
- Martha Stewart (born 1941), lifestyle guide, entrepreneur, TV personality (Jersey City, raised in Nutley)
- Alfred Stieglitz (1864–1946), photographer (Hoboken)
- Rod Streater (born 1988), wide receiver for the Oakland Raiders (Burlington)
- Meryl Streep (born 1949), Academy Award-winning actress (Summit)
- Julian M. Sturtevant (1908–2005), professor of biochemistry, Yale University
- William Graham Sumner (1840–1910), prominent sociologist, educator, academic (Paterson)
- Nick Suriano (born 1997), freestyle and folkstyle wrestler, two-time NCAA Division I champion (Paramus)
- Josh Sussman (born 1983), actor, Glee, Warren the Ape (Teaneck)
- Loretta Swit (1937–2025), actress, Margaret Houlihan on M*A*S*H (Passaic)
- Tammy Lynn Sytch (born 1972), professional wrestling valet (Fort Monmouth)

=== T–Z ===
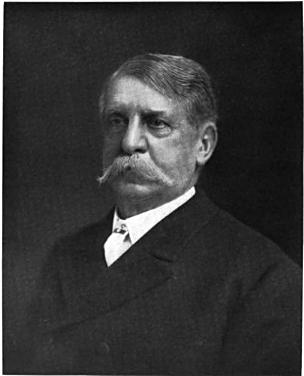
John Taylor (Taylor Ham)

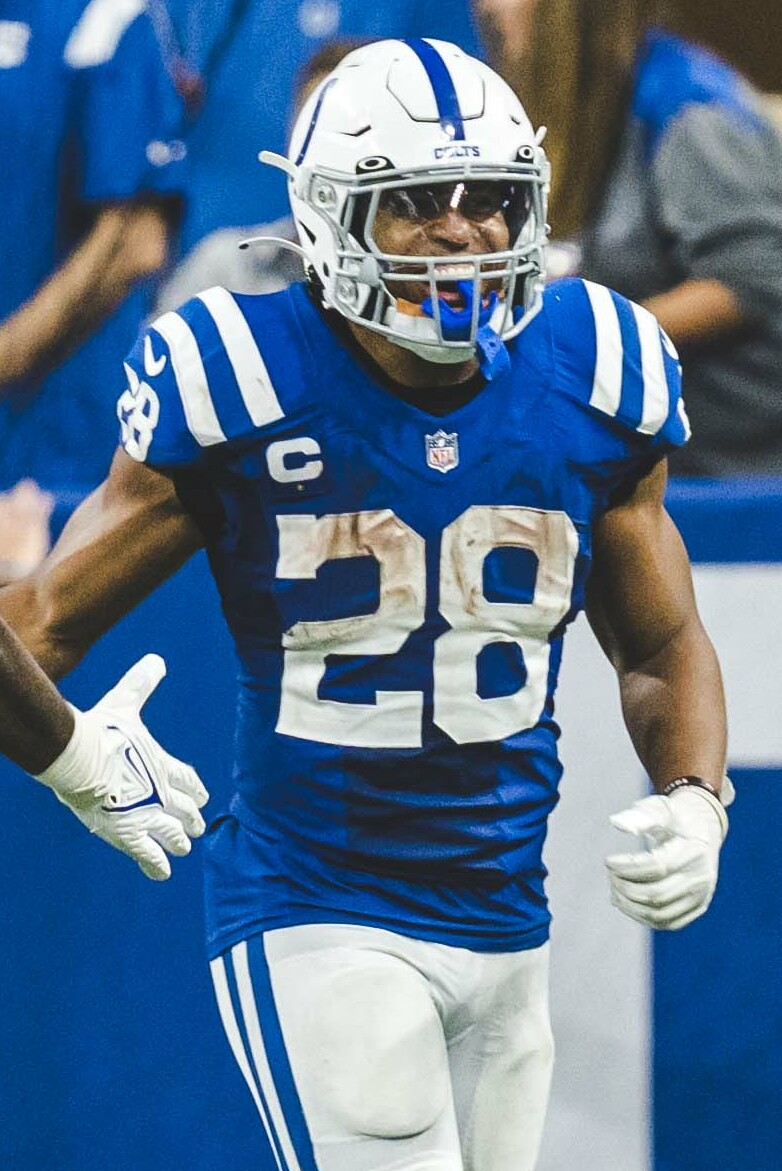
Jonathan Taylor

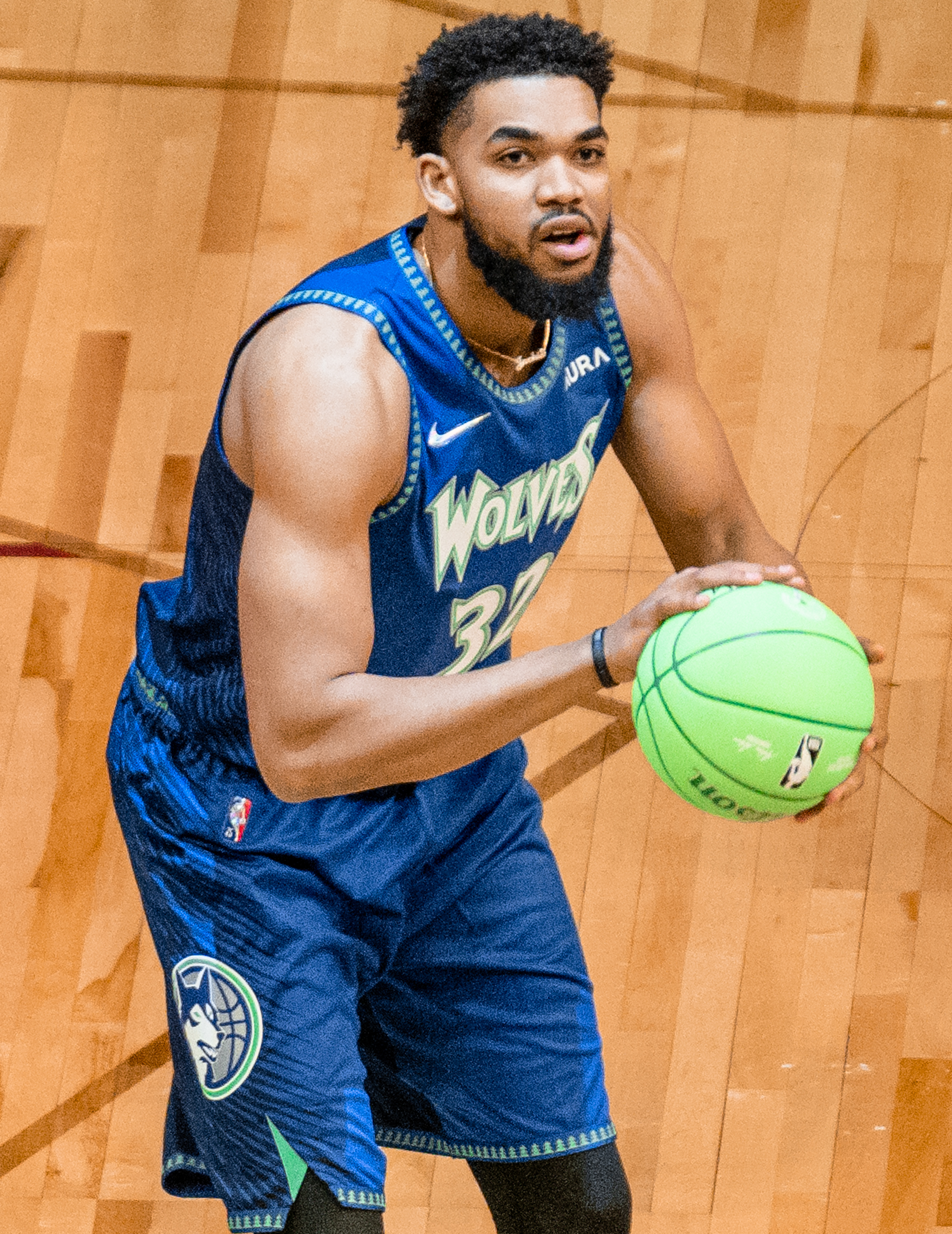
Karl-Anthony Towns

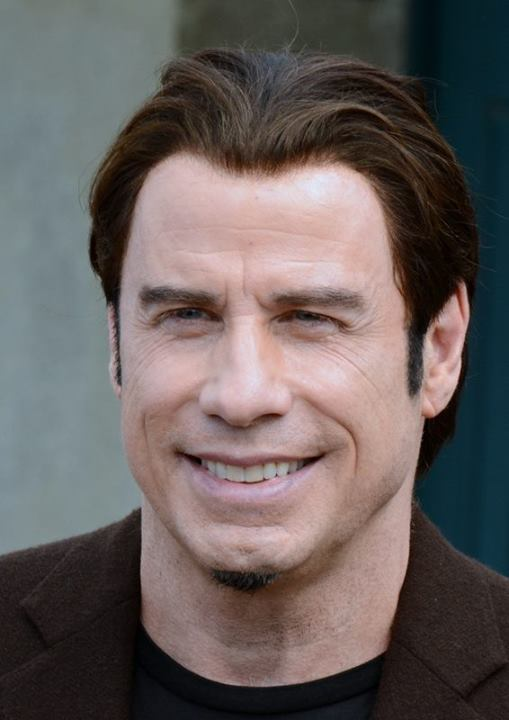
John Travolta

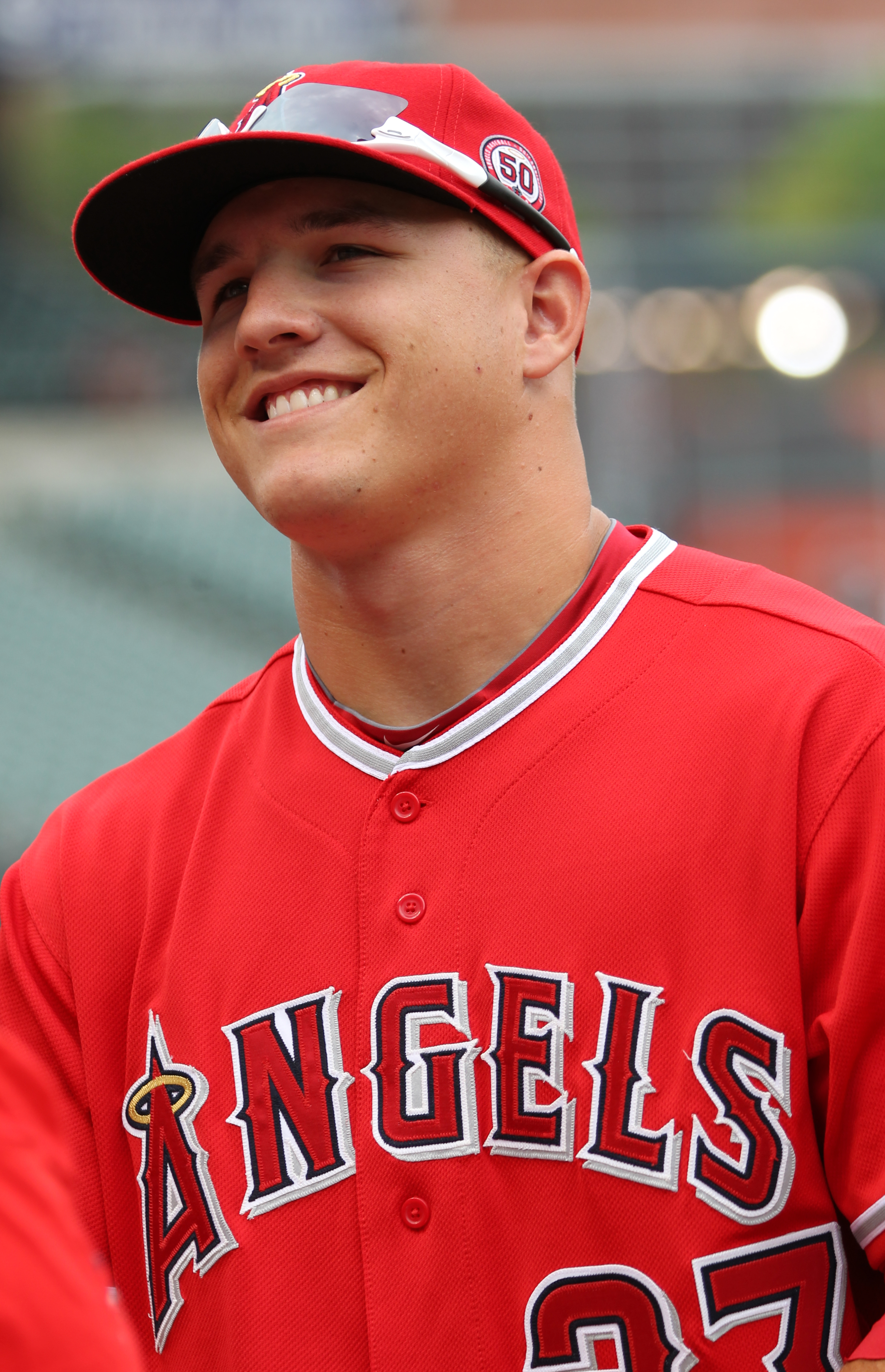
Mike Trout

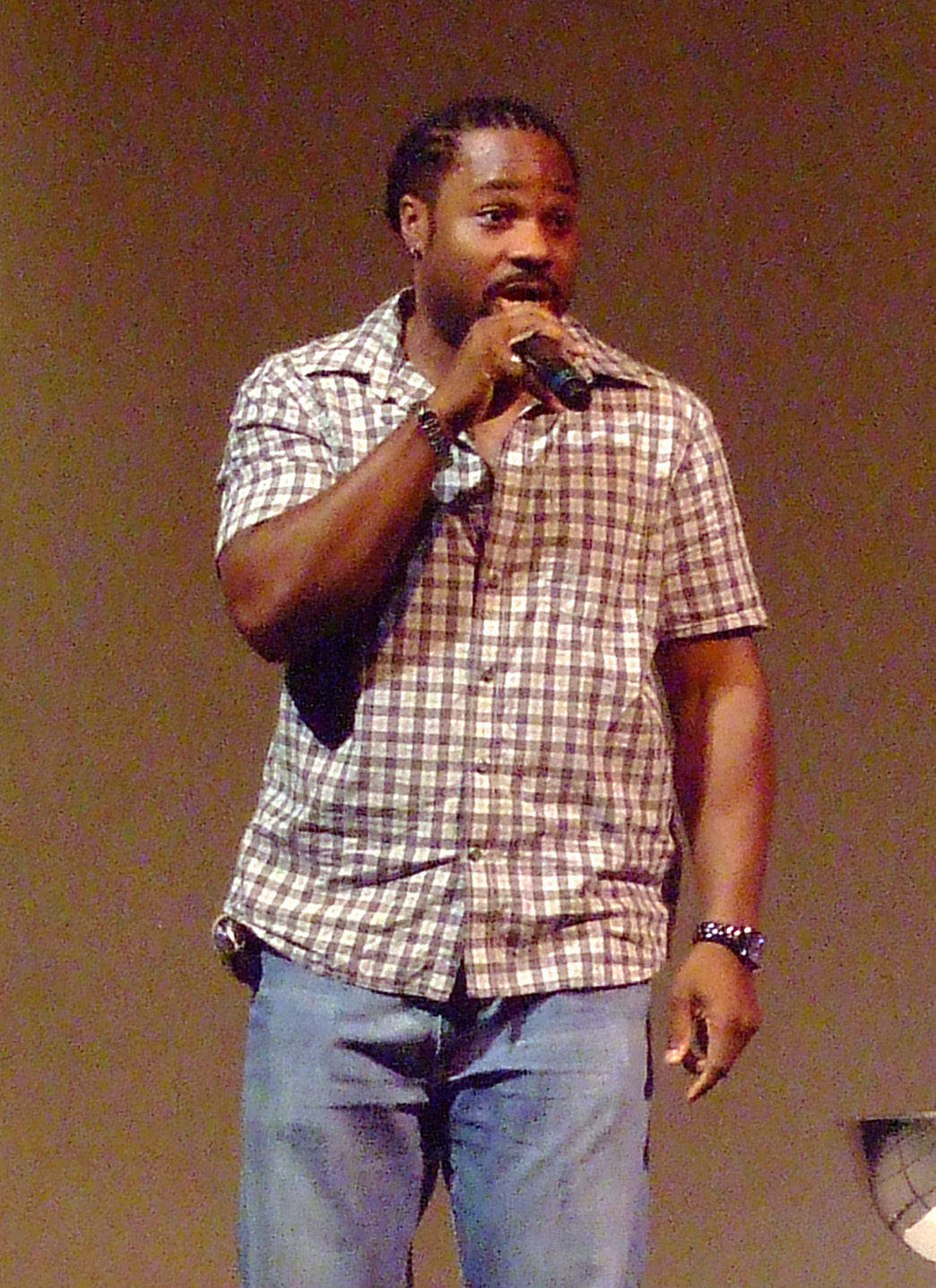
Malcolm Jamal Warner

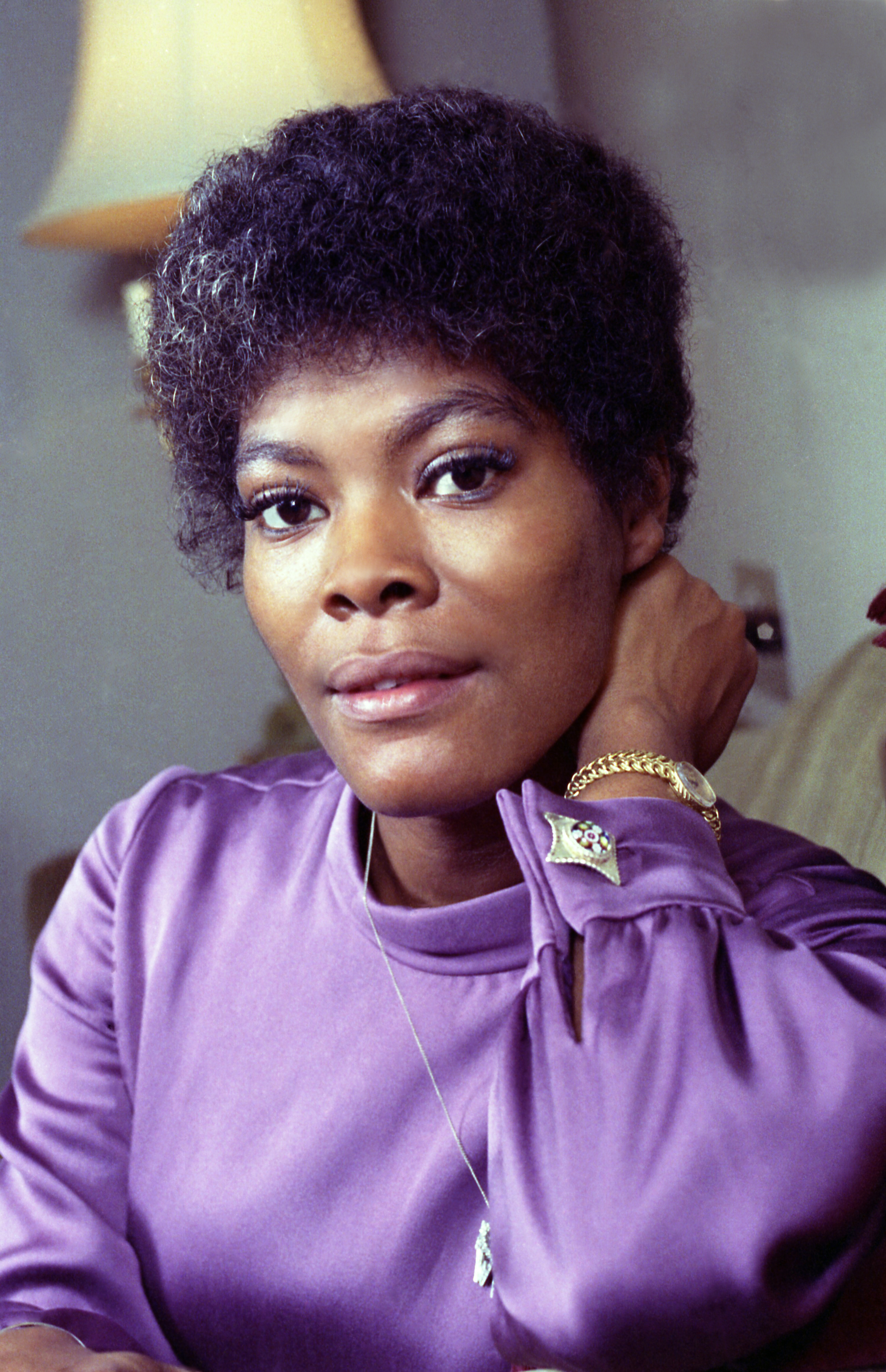
Dionne Warwick

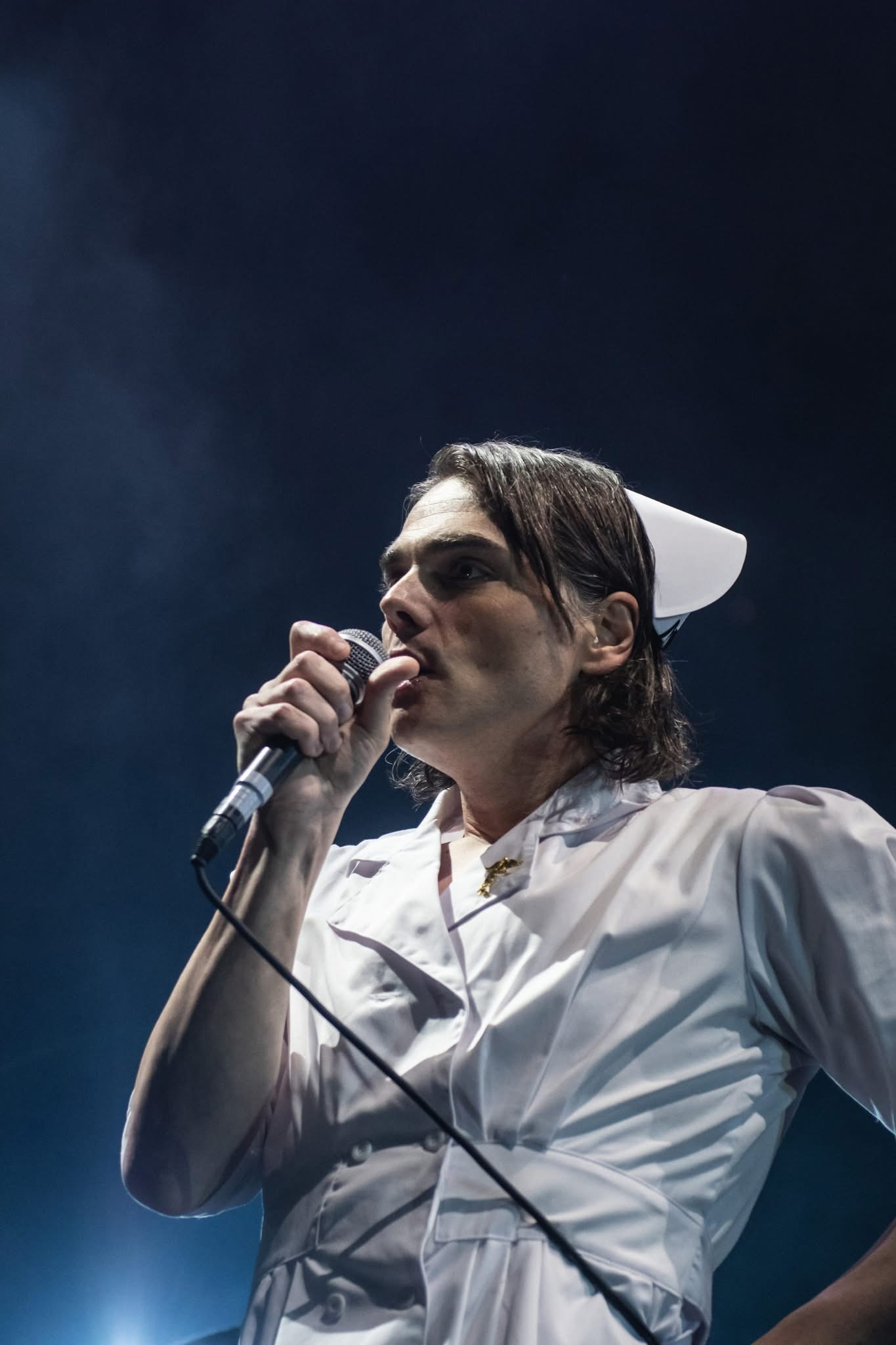
Gerard Way

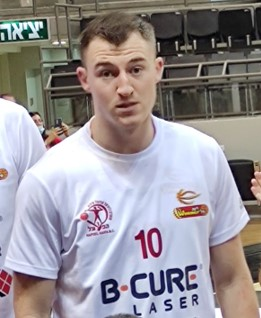
Spencer Weisz

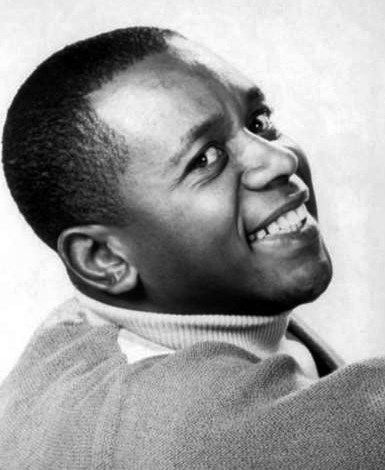
Flip Wilson

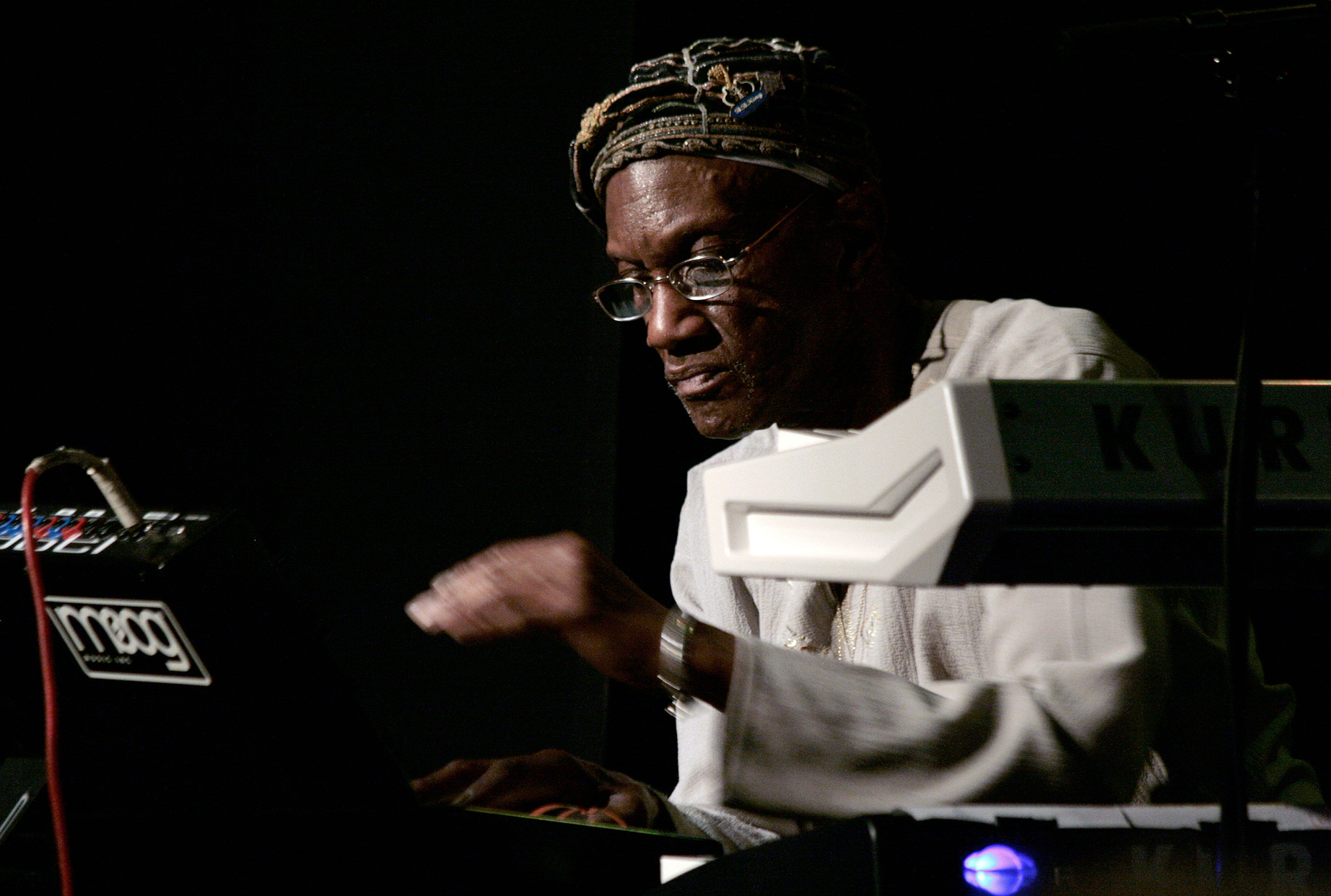
Bernie Worrell

- Michael Taccetta (born 1947), high-ranking member of the Lucchese crime family (Newark)
- Julian Talley (born 1989), wide receiver for the New York Giants (Stratford)
- Danny Tamberelli (born 1982), actor (Wyckoff)
- Kathryn Tappen (born 1981), NBC sportscaster (Morristown)
- Glenn Taranto (born 1959), actor, Gomez in The New Addams Family (Hackensack)
- Frank Tashlin (1913–1972), animator, screenwriter, and film director (Weehawken)
- Giselle Tavera (born 1993), singer (Cherry Hill)
- John Taylor (1836–1909), businessman, politician, creator of Taylor brand pork roll
- Jonathan Taylor (born 1999), NFL running back (Salem)
- Eileen Tell (born 1966), tennis player
- Jon Tenney (born 1961), actor, The Closer, Get Real, Scandal (Princeton)
- Jack Terricloth (1970–2021), lead singer of The World/Inferno Friendship Society (Bridgewater)
- Joe Theismann (born 1949), quarterback for Notre Dame and the Washington Redskins, TV color commentator (New Brunswick, raised in South River)
- Tim Thomas (born 1977), NBA forward (Paterson)
- Jason Thompson (born 1986), forward and center for the Sacramento Kings (Mount Laurel)
- Steve Tisch (born 1949), chairman and executive vice president for the New York Giants; also a film and television producer (Lakewood)
- Ashley Tisdale (born 1985), actress, High School Musical, The Suite Life of Zack and Cody, Phineas and Ferb and singer (Ocean Township)
- Ray Toro (born 1977), lead guitarist of My Chemical Romance (Kearny)
- Karl-Anthony Towns (born 1995), NBA player (Edison)
- Justin Trattou (born 1988), defensive end for the Minnesota Vikings (Maywood)
- Ellen Travolta (born 1940), actress, Charles in Charge, Joanie Loves Chachi (Englewood)
- John Travolta (born 1954), actor, Saturday Night Fever, Grease, Pulp Fiction (Englewood)
- Linda Tripp (1949–2020), central figure in Clinton–Lewinsky scandal of 1998 and 1999 (Jersey City)
- Mike Trout (born 1991), outfielder for the Los Angeles Angels (Millville)
- Martin Truex Jr. (born 1980), NASCAR driver (Englishtown)
- Eddie Trunk (born 1964), music historian, radio personality, author (Madison)
- Louise Tunison (1872–1899), composer
- Joe Lynn Turner (born 1951), professional rock/metal vocalist w/Rainbow, Deep Purple, Yngwie Malmsteen's Rising Force, solo artist (Hackensack, New Jersey)
- Rahshon Turner (born 1975), basketball player
- David Tyree (born 1980), former NFL wide receiver and special teamer, primarily with the New York Giants (Livingston, raised in Montclair)
- Laura Tyson (born 1947), economist, Director of the National Economic Council under Bill Clinton (Bayonne)
- Tiquan Underwood (born 1987), wide receiver for the New England Patriots (North Brunswick)
- James Urbaniak (born 1963), actor, voice actor, The Venture Bros. (Bayonne)
- Michael Uslan (born 1951), producer of the Batman movies (born in Bayonne, has lived in Cedar Grove)
- Alfred Vail (1807–1859), machinist, inventor, helped develop and commercialize the telegraph (Morristown)
- Buddy Valastro (born 1977), reality television star, Cake Boss (Hoboken)
- Frankie Valli (born 1934), lead singer, The Four Seasons (Newark)
- Lee Van Cleef (1925–1989), actor, The Good, the Bad and the Ugly, The Man Who Shot Liberty Valance, Escape from New York (Somerville)
- Rudy Van Gelder (1924–2016), Blue Note Records recording engineer (Jersey City)
- Jeff Van Note (born 1946), center for the Atlanta Falcons (South Orange)
- James Van Riemsdyk (born 1989), NHL player (Middletown)
- Johnny Vander Meer (1918–1997), baseball pitcher who threw two consecutive no-hitters for Reds in 1938 (Prospect Park)
- Sarah Vaughan (1924–1990), singer (Newark)
- Chris Vaughn (born–1976), filmmaker, songwriter (Neptune Township)
- Tom Verducci (born 1960), sportswriter for Sports Illustrated and si.com, commentator MLB Tonight (East Orange, raised in Glen Ridge)
- Tom Verlaine (born 1949), television guitarist (Denville)
- Alex Vincent (born 1981), child actor (Newark, raised in Maywood)
- Art Vincent (1926–1993), radio personality ()
- Dick Vitale (born 1939), sportscaster (Passaic)
- Vitamin C (born 1969), pop singer (Old Bridge Township)
- Floyd Vivino (born 1951), actor (Paterson)
- Tony Vlachos (born 1973), reality TV personality and two-time winner of Survivor. (Jersey City)
- Frank Vogel (born 1973), head coach for the Indiana Pacers (Wildwood)
- Paul Volcker (1927–2019), economist, chairman of the Economic Recovery Advisory Board under President Barack Obama (Cape May, raised in Teaneck)
- Frederica Von Stade (born 1945), operatic mezzo-soprano (Somerville)
- Rich Vos (born 1957), stand-up comic (Plainfield)
- Jersey Joe Walcott (1914–1994), heavyweight champion (Merchantville)
- Tracey Walter (born 1947), character actor (Jersey City)
- Patrick Warburton (born 1964), actor (Paterson)
- Violet Richardson Ward (1888–1979), physical education instructor
- Travis Warech (born 1991), American-German-Israeli basketball player for Israeli team Hapoel Be'er Sheva
- Malcolm Jamal Warner (1970–2025), actor (Jersey City)
- Dionne Warwick (born 1940), R&B singer, actress (East Orange)
- Rebecca Watson (born 1980), skeptical blogger and podcast host who founded the Skepchick blog
- Vernee Watson-Johnson (born 1954), actress (Trenton)
- Gerard Way (born 1977), lead singer of My Chemical Romance (Belleville)
- Mikey Way (born 1980), bass guitarist of My Chemical Romance (Belleville)
- Charlie Weis (born 1956), head football coach for University of Kansas (Middlesex)
- Joyce Weisbecker (born 1958), video game designer
- Shaun Weiss (born 1978), actor, The Mighty Ducks movies (Montvale)
- Spencer Weisz (born 1995), American-Israeli professional basketball player for Hapoel Haifa of the Israeli Basketball Premier League
- Richard Wenk (born 1956), film director and screenwriter (Metchun)
- Paul Wesley (born 1982), actor in The Vampire Diaries, (New Brunswick), raised in (Marlboro)
- David West (born 1980), power forward for the Indiana Pacers (Teaneck)
- Stylez G. White (born 1979), NFL defensive end (Newark)
- Tahir Whitehead (born 1990), linebacker for the Detroit Lions (Jersey City, raised in Newark)
- Susie Wiles (born 1957), 32nd White House chief of staff under President Donald Trump (Saddle River)
- Muhammad Wilkerson (born 1989), defensive end for the New York Jets (Linden)
- C. K. Williams (1936–2015), poet, critic and translator (Newark)
- Gary Williams (born 1945), basketball coach for University of Maryland, current Big Ten Network analyst (Collingswood)
- J. D. Williams (born 1981), actor (Newark)
- Malinda Williams (born 1975), actress, Tracy "Bird" Van Adams on Soul Food (Elizabeth, raised in Westfield)
- Nick Williams (born 1990), wide receiver for the Atlanta Falcons (Hightstown, raised in East Windsor)
- Wendy Williams (born 1964), radio and TV personality (born in Asbury Park, raised in Ocean Township)
- Terrie Williams, marine biologist and ecophysiologist who studies marine life (raised in New Jersey)
- Flip Wilson (1933–1998), comedian and actor (Jersey City)
- Frank Winters (born 1964), NFL center, primarily for the Green Bay Packers (Hoboken)
- Henry Wittenberg (1918–2010), freestyle wrestler, Olympic champion, two-time Olympic medalist (Jersey City)
- Alex Wojciechowicz (1915–1992), Hall of Fame NFL center and linebacker (South River)
- Sam Woodyard (1925–1988), big band drummer with Duke Ellington and others (Elizabeth)
- Beulah Woolston (1828–1886), teacher, translator, editor (Vincentown)
- Corey Wootton (born 1987), defensive end for the Chicago Bears (Rutherford)
- Jason Worilds (born 1988), outside linebacker for the Pittsburgh Steelers (Rahway, raised in Carteret)
- Bernie Worrell (1944–2016), keyboards, Parliament-Funkadelic, Talking Heads (Long Branch/Clinton)
- Chris Wragge (born 1970), sports journalist and presenter for WCBS-TV (Hackensack)
- Kelly Wright (born 1987), artist, radio host on WPIR Pratt Radio (Maywood)
- Robert Wuhl (born 1951), actor, writer, comedian, Batman, Cobb, Arliss (Union)
- Chris Wylde (born 1976), actor, comedian, Strip Mall (Hackettstown)
- Zakk Wylde (born 1967), guitarist for Ozzy Osbourne and Black Label Society (Bayonne, raised in Jackson Township)
- Emmanuel Yarborough (1964–2015), amateur sumo wrestler, mixed martial arts competitor (Rahway)
- Maury Yeston (born 1945), classical and Broadway composer, lyricist, and musicologist (Jersey City)
- Aaron Yoo (born 1979), actor, Disturbia (East Brunswick)
- Albert Young (born 1985), running back for the Pittsburgh Steelers (Moorestown)
- Karen Young (born 1958), actress, Agent Robyn Sanseverino on The Sopranos (Pequannock)
- Larry Young (1940–1978), hard bop jazz organist (Newark)
- David Zabriskie (born 1986), retired amateur wrestler and current wrestling coach (Branchville)
- Pia Zadora (born 1954), actress and singer (Hoboken)
- Stuart Zagnit (born 1952), actor (New Brunswick)
- Rachel Zegler (born 2001), actress, West Side Story (Hackensack)
- Jackie Zeman (born 1967), actress, General Hospital (Englewood)
- Ian Ziering (born 1964), actor, Beverly Hills, 90210 (Newark, raised in West Orange)
- Vanessa Zima (born 1986), actress (Phillipsburg)
- Yvonne Zima (born 1989), actress, The Young and the Restless, ER (Phillipsburg)
- Jeremy Zuttah (born 1986), offensive lineman for the Baltimore Ravens (Edison)
- Abner Zwillman (1904–1959), Jewish American mob boss (Newark)

== Born in New Jersey, raised elsewhere ==
Grover Cleveland

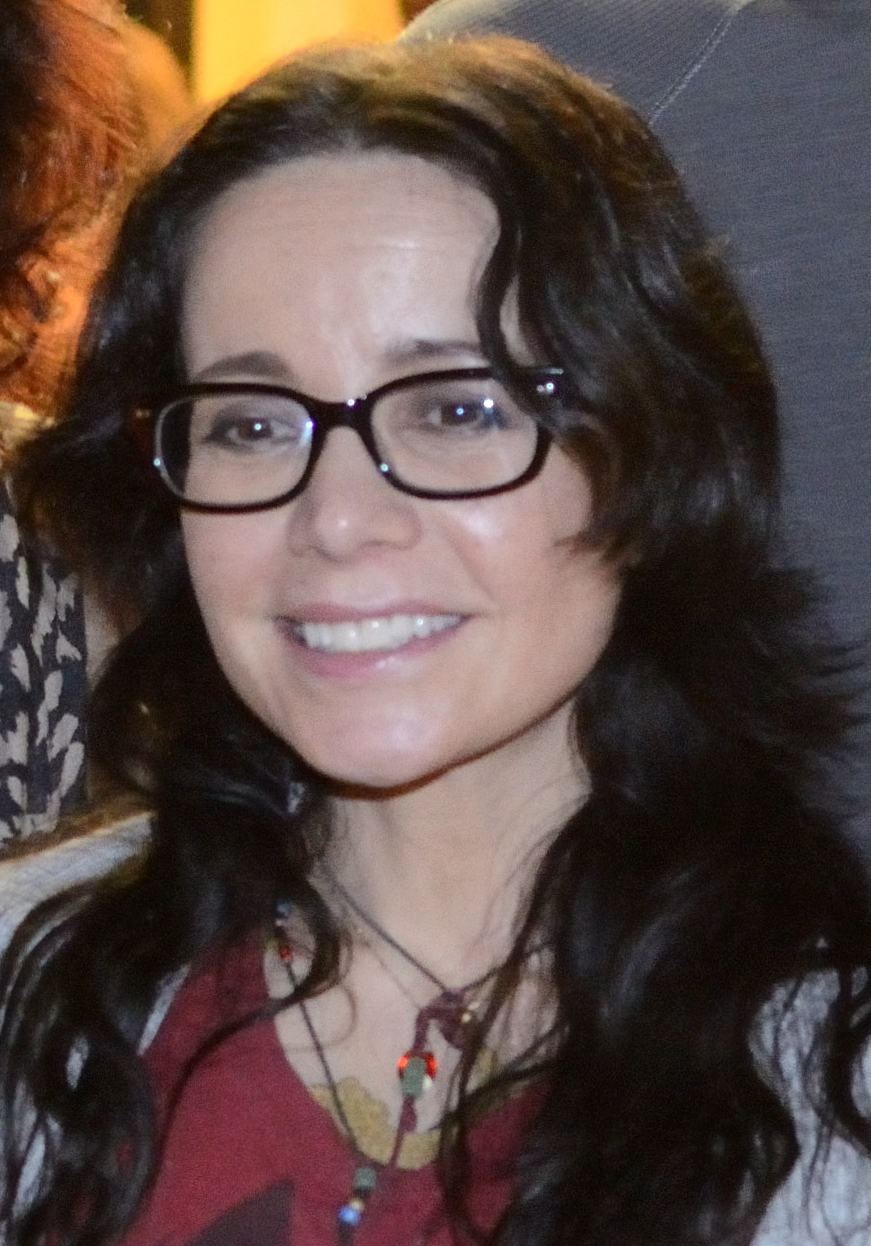
Janeane Garofalo

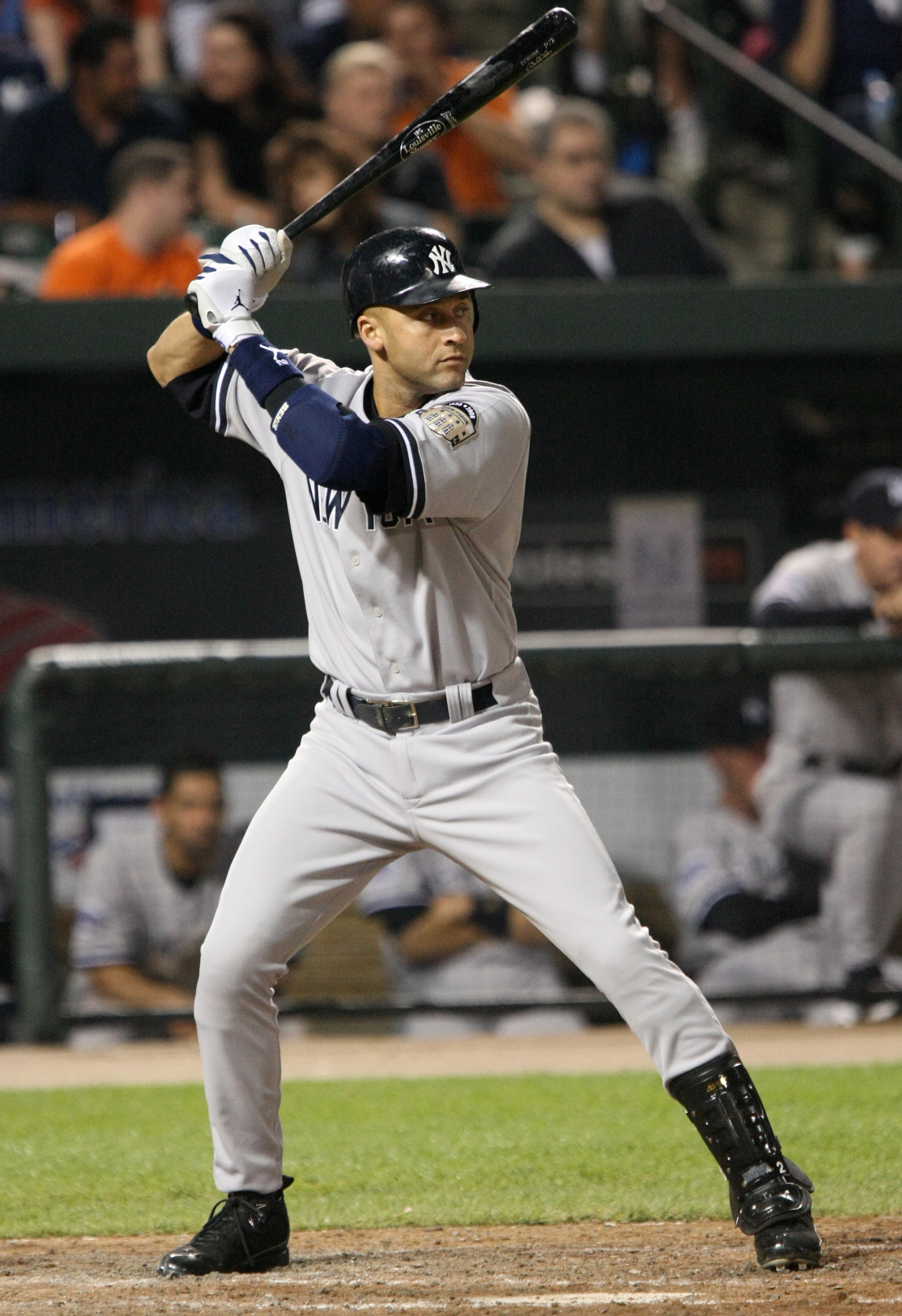
Derek Jeter

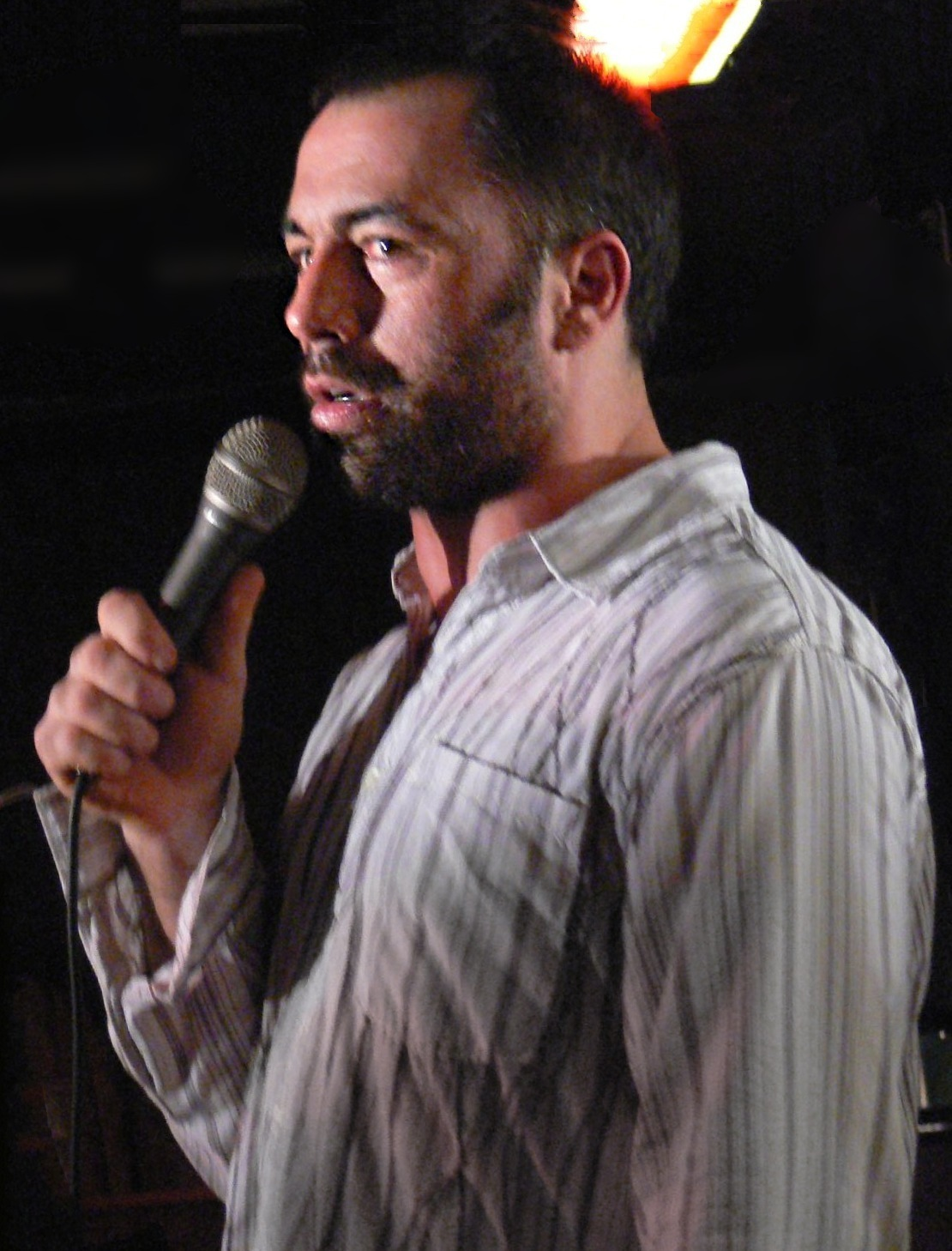
Joe Rogan

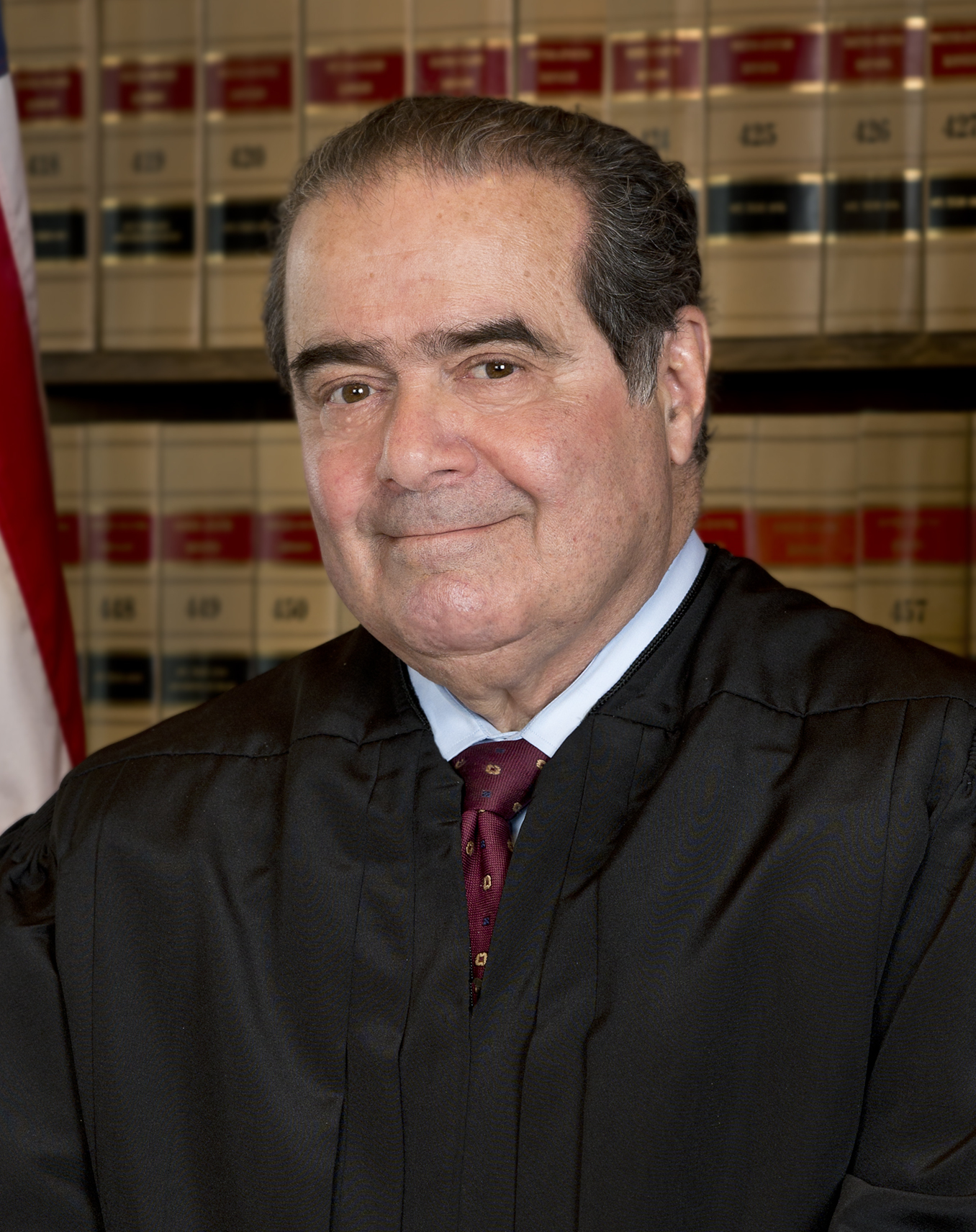
Antonin Scalia

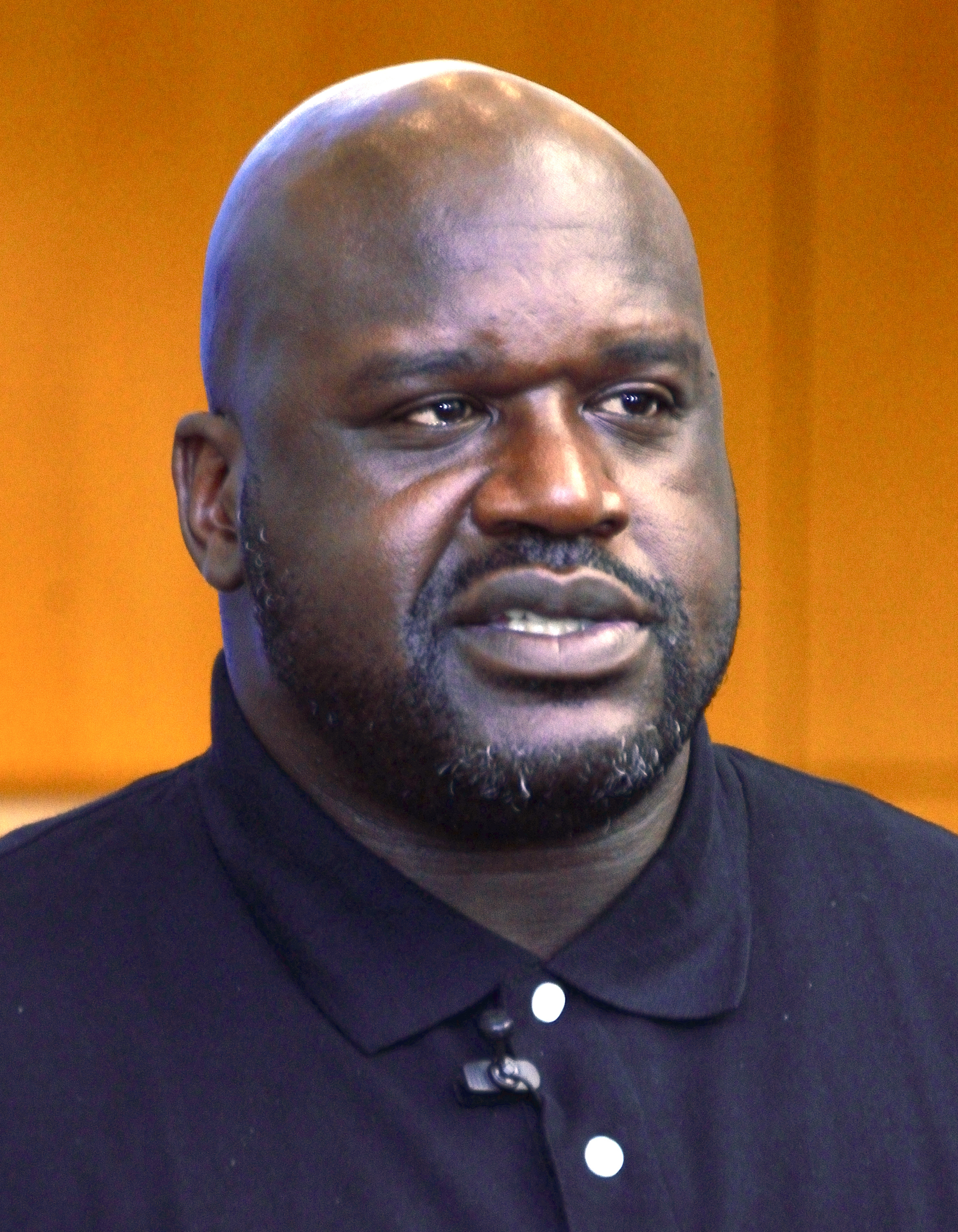
Shaquille O'Neal

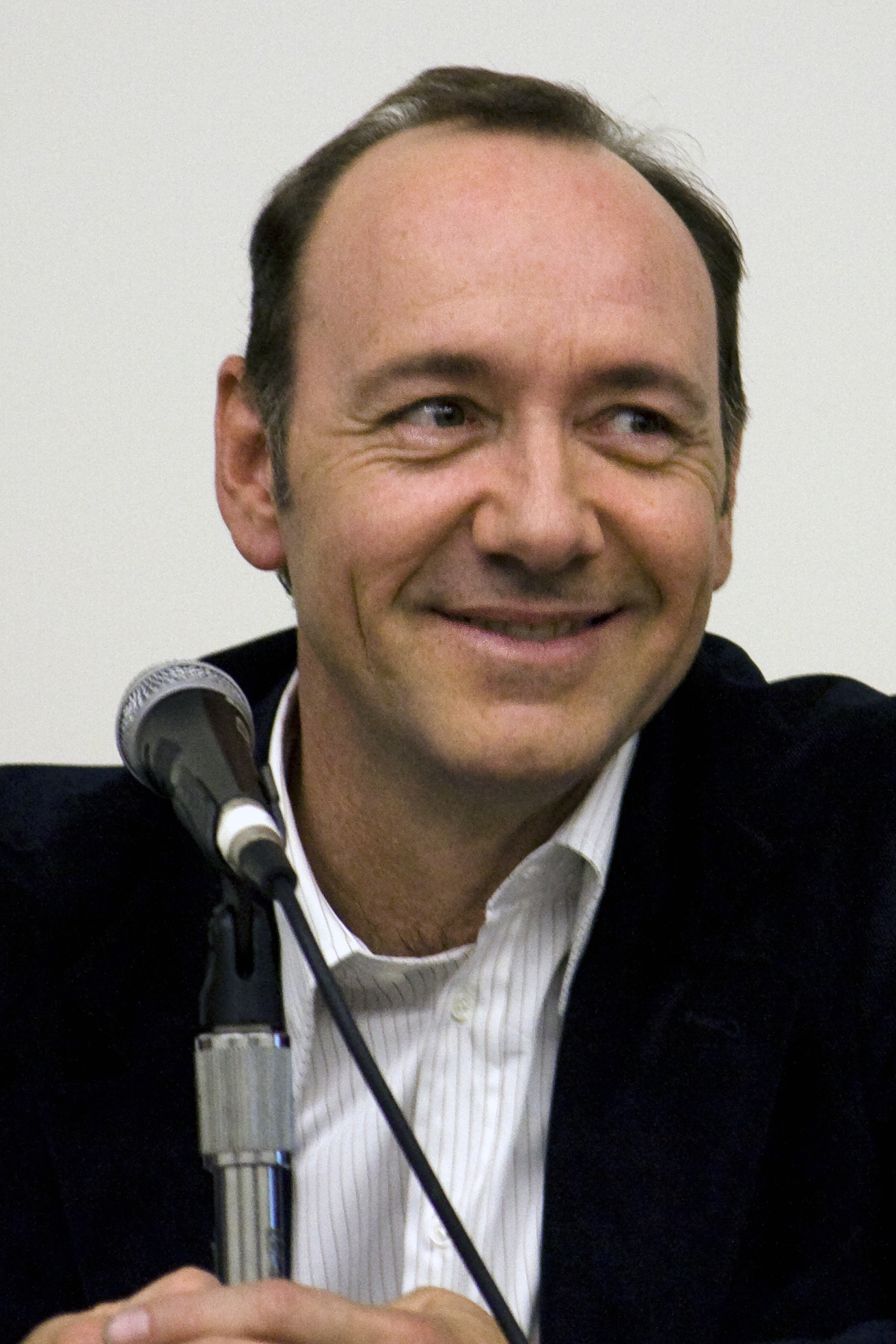
Kevin Spacey

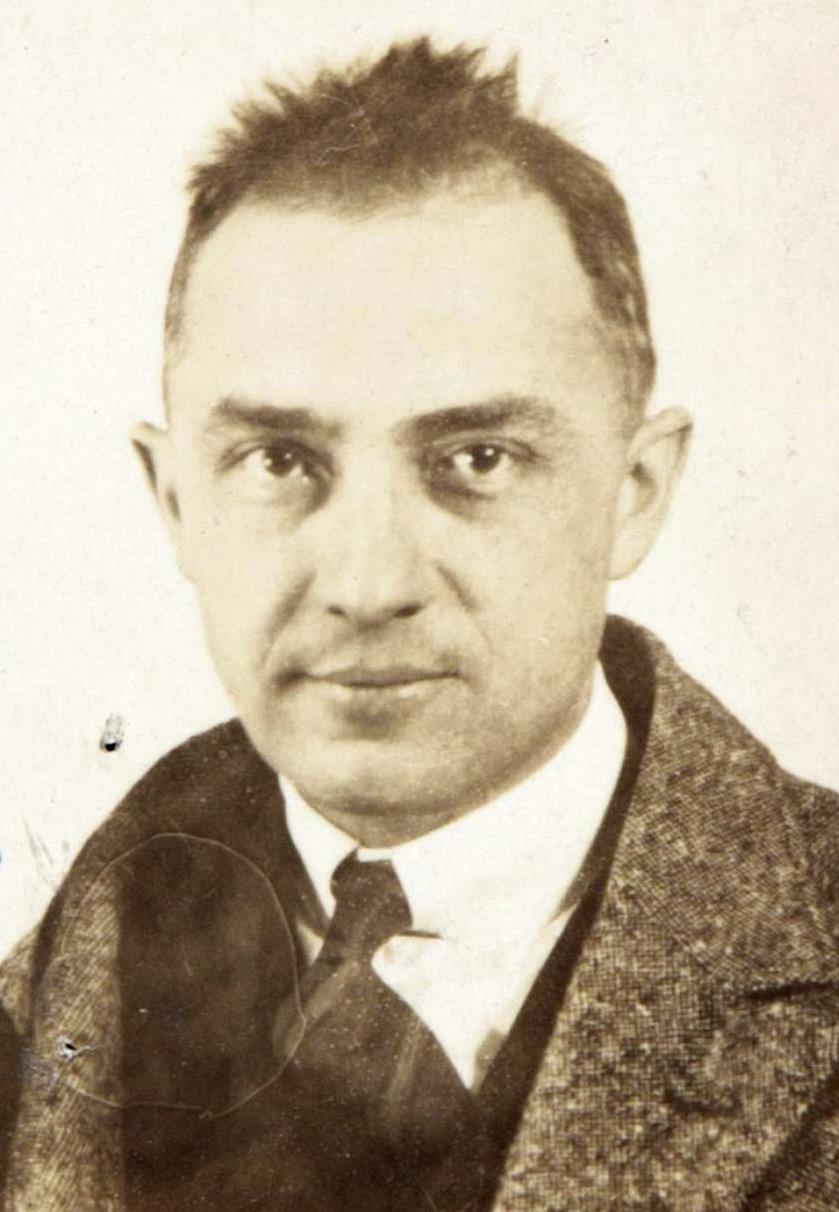
William Carlos Williams

- Jack Abramoff (born 1958), former lobbyist and businessman convicted of fraud, conspiracy, and tax evasion (Atlantic City, moved to Beverly Hills, California, at age 9)
- Lavoy Allen (born 1989), power forward for the Philadelphia 76ers (Trenton, moved to Pennsylvania)
- Jozy Altidore (born 1989), soccer player (Livingston, raised in Boca Raton, Florida)
- Priscilla Barnes (born 1955), actress, Terri Alden on Three's Company (Fort Dix, raised in California)
- Jeffrey Bewkes (born 1952), CEO and chairman of Time Warner (Paterson, raised in Darien, Connecticut)
- Robert Blake (1933–2023), actor, Baretta (born in Nutley, raised in Los Angeles)
- Elizabeth Bogush (born 1977), actress, Titans (Perth Amboy, raised in Pittsburgh, and Hingham, MA)
- Phil Bredesen (born 1943), Governor of Tennessee (Oceanport, raised in different parts of the country)
- Marshon Brooks (born 1989), player with the New Jersey Nets (Long Branch, raised in Tucker, Georgia)
- Michael R. Burns (born 1958), vice chairman of Lions Gate Entertainment (born in Long Branch, raised in New Canaan, Connecticut)
- Iris Chang (1968–2004), author, journalist (Princeton, raised in Champaign-Urbana Illinois)
- Mary Chapin Carpenter (born 1958), Grammy-winning folk and country singer (born in Princeton; moved to Japan, then Washington, D.C.)
- Sean Casey (born 1974), former MLB All-Star first baseman, current color commentator for the Cincinnati Reds (Willingboro, moved to Pittsburgh)
- Paul Cushing Child (1902–1994), husband of celebrity chef Julia Child (Montclair, raised in Boston)
- Grover Cleveland (1837–1908), 22nd and 24th president of the United States (Caldwell, raised in western New York)
- Jason Cook (born 1980), actor, Days of Our Lives, General Hospital (Somerdale, raised in California)
- James Fenimore Cooper (1789–1851), writer (Burlington, raised in Cooperstown)
- Brian De Palma (born 1940), film director (born in Newark, raised in Philadelphia and New Hampshire)
- Sylvia Earle (born 1935), marine biologist, explorer, author (Gibbstown, raised in Florida)
- Eric Ebron (born 1993), tight end for the Detroit Lions (Newark, moved to North Carolina)
- Mel Ferrer (1917–2008), actor, director, Falcon Crest (Elberon, raised in New York and Connecticut)
- John Forsythe (1918–2010), actor, Dynasty, Charlie's Angels, Bachelor Father (Penns Grove, raised in Brooklyn, New York)
- Kate French (born 1985), actress, Wicked Wicked Games, The L Word (Flemington, raised in Long Island, New York)
- Kevin Friedland (born 1981), soccer player
- Dana Fuchs (born 1976), singer/songwriter (born in New Jersey, raised in Wildwood, Florida)
- Janeane Garofalo (born 1964), comedian, actress, left-wing activist (born in Newton, raised in California and Texas)
- David Garrard (born 1978), quarterback for the Jacksonville Jaguars (Plainfield, raised in Durham, NC)
- Paul Gleason (1939–2006), actor, The Breakfast Club (Jersey City, raised in Florida)
- Mike Goodson (born 1987), running back for the Oakland Raiders (born in Irvington, raised in Texas)
- Chuck Greenberg (born 1961), former owner of the Texas Rangers (Englewood, raised in Pittsburgh)
- Robert David Hall (born 1947), actor, CSI (East Orange, moved to California)
- Sterling Hayden (1916–1986), actor (born in Upper Montclair; as a child, moved to NH, MA, PA, D.C., and ME)
- Pepe Hern (1927–2009), actor raised in California
- Jason Heyward (born 1989), right fielder for the Chicago Cubs (Ridgewood, raised in Georgia)
- Linda Hunt (born 1945), Oscar-winning actress (Morristown, raised in Westport, Connecticut)
- Ice-T (born 1958), rapper and actor (Newark, moved to Los Angeles)
- Richie Incognito (born 1983), guard for the Buffalo Bills (Englewood, raised in Glendale, Arizona)
- Derek Jeter (born 1974), shortstop for the New York Yankees (born in Pequannock, but raised primarily in Kalamazoo, Michigan)
- Roger Wolfe Kahn (1907–1962), bandleader, composer, arranger, and test pilot (born in Morristown, but raised and lived in New York City)
- Richard Kind (born 1956), actor, Mad About You, Spin City (Trenton, raised in Pennsylvania)
- Bobby Korecky (born 1979), relief pitcher for the Toronto Blue Jays (Hillside, moved to Michigan)
- Alfred L. Kroeber (1876–1960), cultural anthropologist (Hoboken, raised in NY)
- Scott LaFaro (1936–1961), jazz double bassist (Irvington, raised in Geneva, NY)
- Lila Lee (1905–1973), silent and early sound film actress from Union City, raised in New York City
- Sue Ane Langdon (born 1936), actress, Arnie, Bachelor Father (Paterson, raised in NY, MI, OR)
- Joshua Lederberg (1925–2008), Nobel Prize–winning molecular biologist (Montclair, raised in Manhattan)
- Gordon MacRae (1921–1986), actor, singer (East Orange, raised in MA and NY)
- Norman Mailer (1923–2007), novelist, essayist, poetm, Pulitzer-winner (Long Branch, raised in Brooklyn)
- Camryn Manheim (born 1961), actress, Emmy-winner,The Practice, Ghost Whisperer, The L Word (West Caldwell, raised in Peoria, Illinois)
- Marc Maron (born 1963), comedian, actor, podcaster (Jersey City, raised in Wayne, Alaska, Albuquerque)
- Richard Matheson (1926–2013), sci-fi and fantasy author and screenwriter (Allendale, raised in Brooklyn)
- Lindsey McKeon (born 1982), actress, Saved by the Bell: The New Class, Guiding Light (Summit, raised in Los Angeles)
- Kate Micucci (born 1980), actress, comedian, and singer-songwriter (born in NJ, raised in Nazareth, PA)
- Bob Milacki (born 1964), former MLB pitcher, primarily with the Baltimore Orioles (Trenton, raised in Lake Havasu City, AZ)
- Christina Milian (born 1981), R&B and pop singer-songwriter, dancer, actress, and model (Jersey City, raised in Waldorf, MD)
- Eric Millegan (born 1974), actor, Zack Addy on Bones (Hackettstown, raised in Springfield, OR)
- Susan Mikula (born 1958), artist and photographer (raised in New Hampshire)
- Philip Morrison (1915–2005), prominent physicist (Somerville, raised in Pittsburgh)
- Charlie Morton (born 1983), starting pitcher for the Tampa Bay Rays (Flemington, raised in Trumbull, CT)
- Montell Owens (born 1984), fullback for the Jacksonville Jaguars (Plainfield, moved to Delaware)
- Daniel Pearl (1963–2002), journalist who was kidnapped and killed by Al-Qaeda (Princeton, raised in Los Angeles)
- A. J. Price (born 1986), point guard for the Indiana Pacers (Orange, raised in East Massapequa, New York)
- Dana Reeve (1961–2006), actress, singer, widow of Christopher Reeve (born in Teaneck, raised in Greenburgh, New York)
- Dennis Rodman (born 1961), former NBA forward, who played primarily with the Detroit Pistons and the Chicago Bulls (Trenton, raised in Dallas, TX)
- Joe Rogan (born 1967), comedian, actor, UFC color commentator (born in Bridgewater, raised in Newton, MA)
- Paul Rudd (born 1969), actor, Knocked Up, The 40-Year-Old Virgin, Friends (born in Passaic, raised in Overland Park, Kansas)
- Zoe Saldaña (born 1978), actress, Avatar, Pirates of the Caribbean, Star Trek (Passaic, raised in Queens, New York)
- Antonin Scalia (1936–2016), associate justice of the U.S. Supreme Court (Trenton, raised in Queens, New York)
- Cindy Sherman (born 1954), photographer (born in Glen Ridge, raised in Huntington, New York)
- Paul Simon (born 1941), musician, composer (born in Newark, raised in Queens, New York)
- T. O'Conor Sloane III (1912–2003), Doubleday editor (born in South Orange, raised in Brooklyn)
- Shaquille O'Neal (born 1972), basketball Hall of Famer, 15-time NBA All-Star center (Newark)
- Kevin Spacey (born 1959), actor (born in South Orange, raised in Southern California)
- Abigail Spanberger (born 1979), current governor of Virginia (Red Bank, raised in Short Pump, Virginia)
- J. Michael Straczynski (born 1954), writer, producer, creator of Babylon 5 and its spin-off (born in Paterson, raised in different parts of the country)
- Red Strader (1902–1956), AAFC and NFL head coach (Newton, raised in Modesto, California)
- Dave Thomas (1932–2002), founder of the Wendy's fast food restaurant chain (born in Atlantic City, raised in different parts of the country)
- Jack Warden (1920–2006), Emmy-winning actor, N.Y.P.D., The Bad News Bears, Crazy Like a Fox (Newark, raised in Louisville, Kentucky)
- Liza Weil (born 1977), actress, Paris Geller on Gilmore Girls (born in NJ, raised in Lansdale, Pennsylvania)
- William Carlos Williams (1883–1963), poet (Rutherford), raised in Dominican Republic
- Jane Wyatt (1910–2006), three-time Emmy-winning actress, Father Knows Best (Mahwah, raised in New York City)
- Nick Zano (born 1978), actor, What I Like About You, Beverly Hills Chihuahua (Nutley, raised in Wellington, Florida)

== Born elsewhere, raised in New Jersey ==
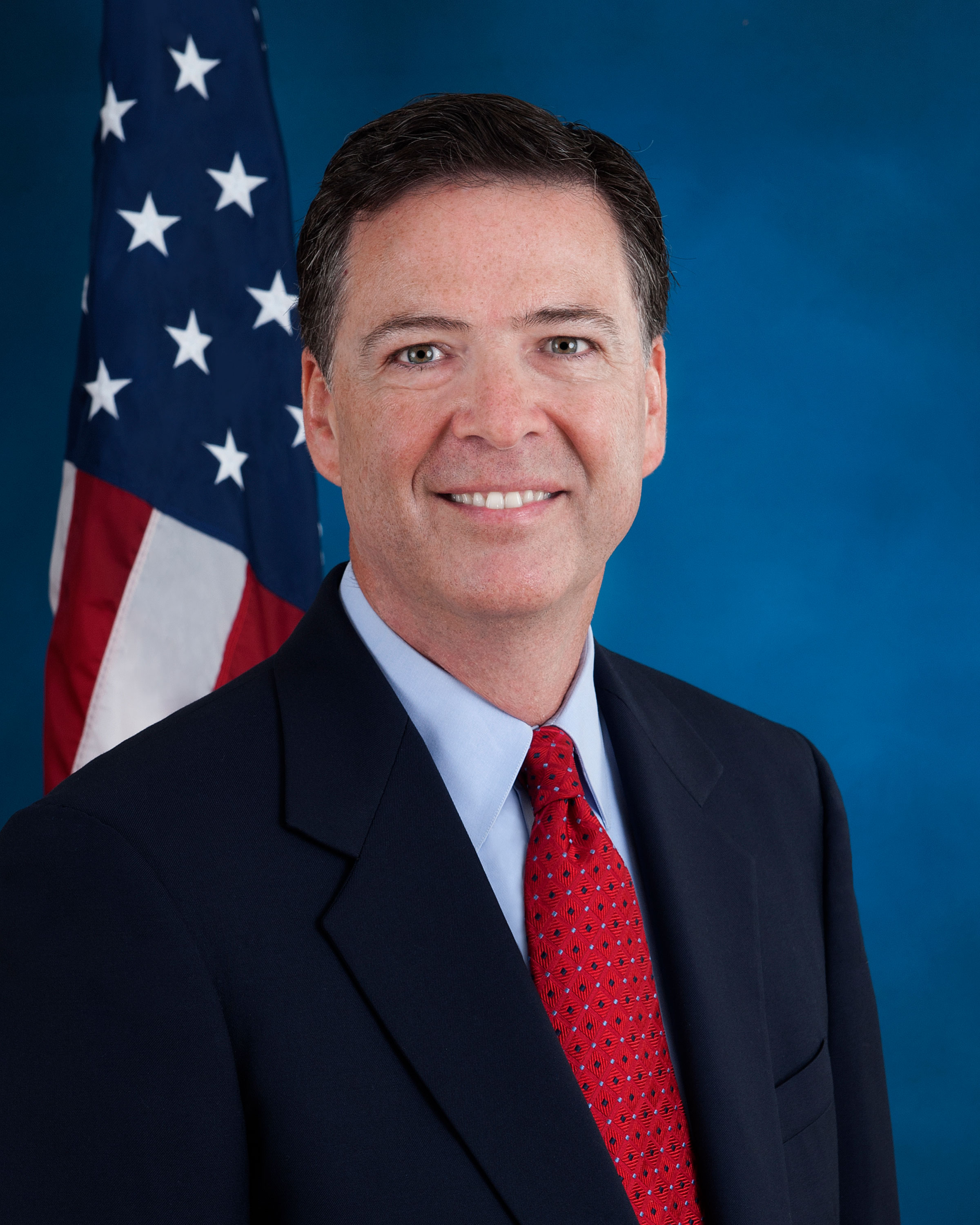
James Comey

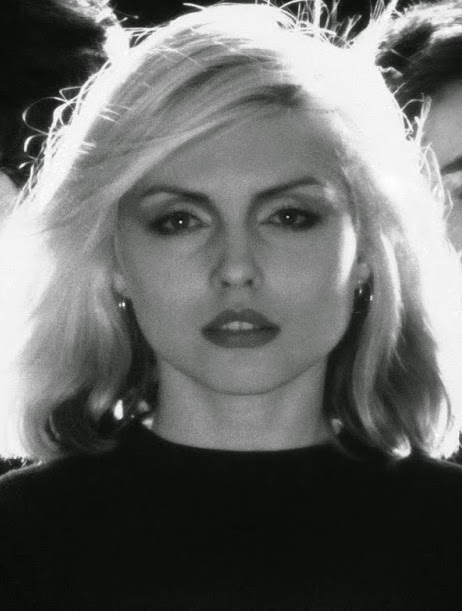
Debbie Harry

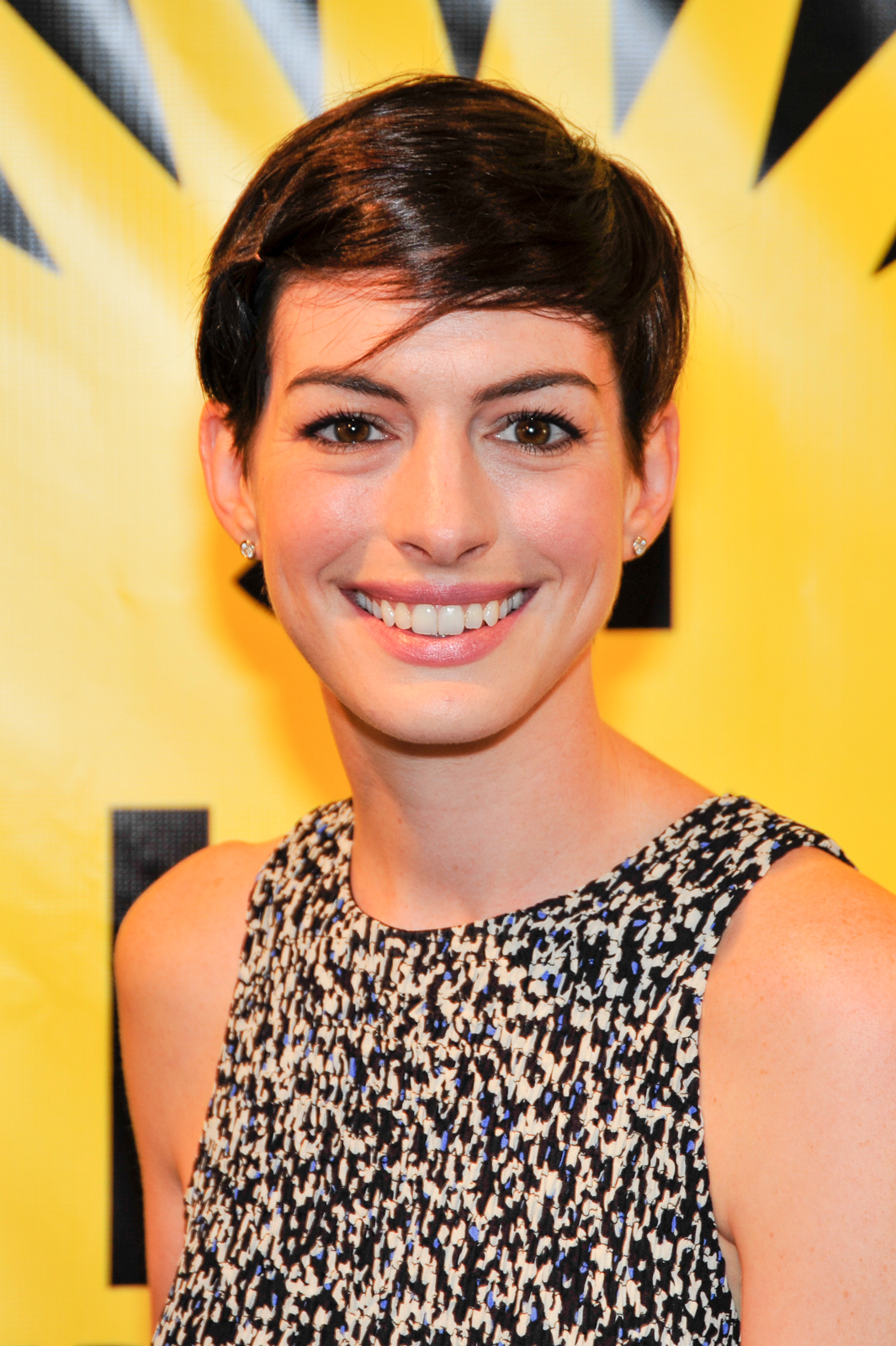
Anne Hathaway

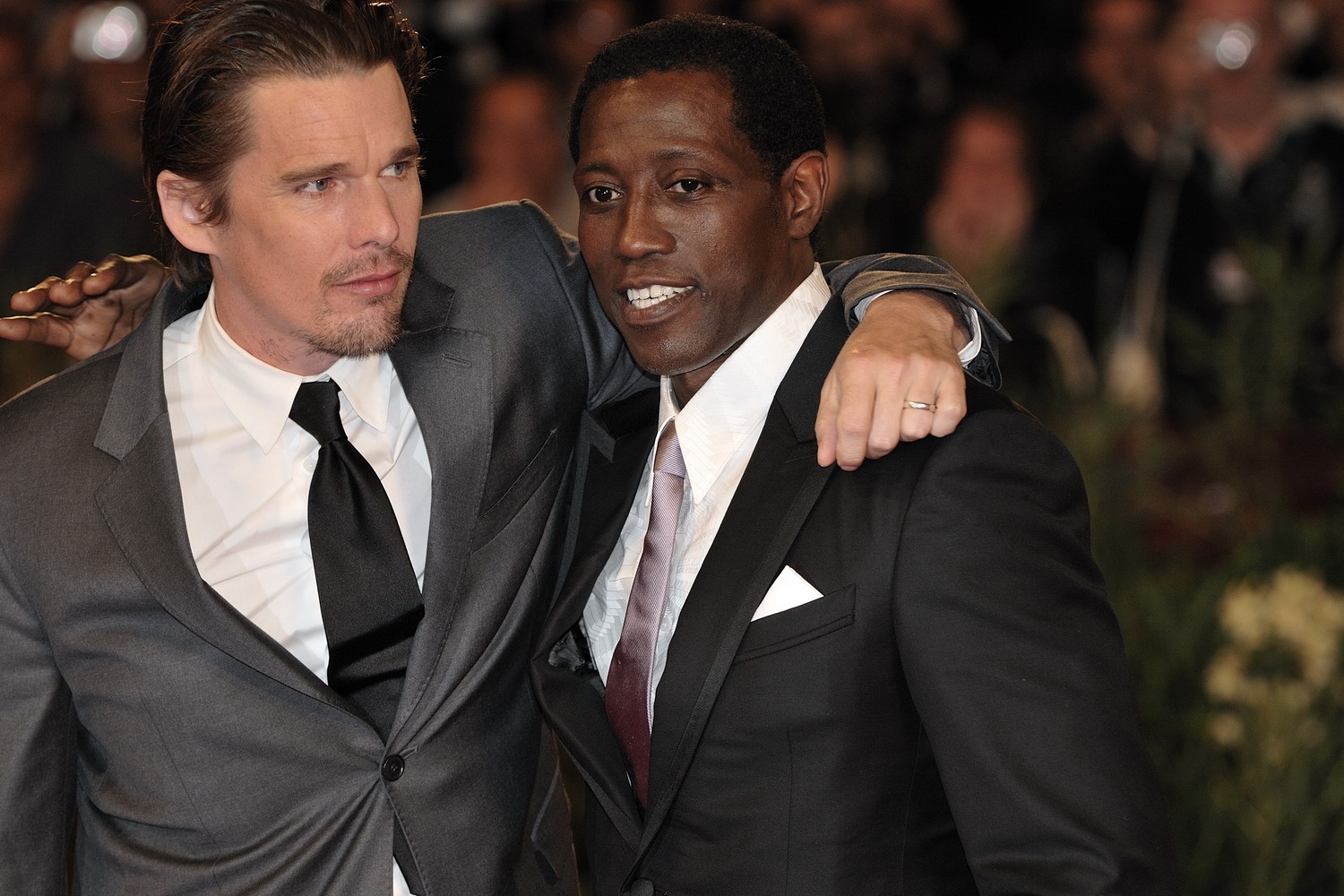
Ethan Hawke and Wesley Snipes

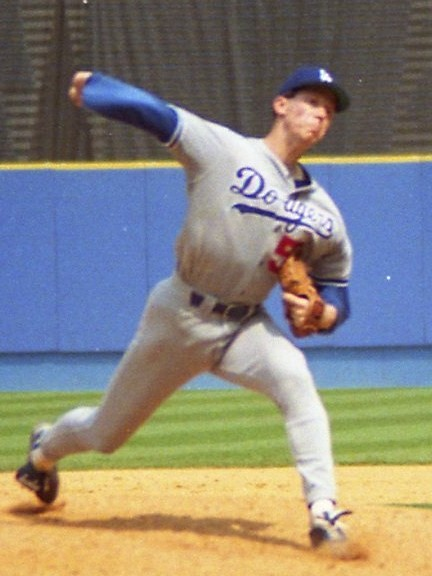
Orel Hershiser

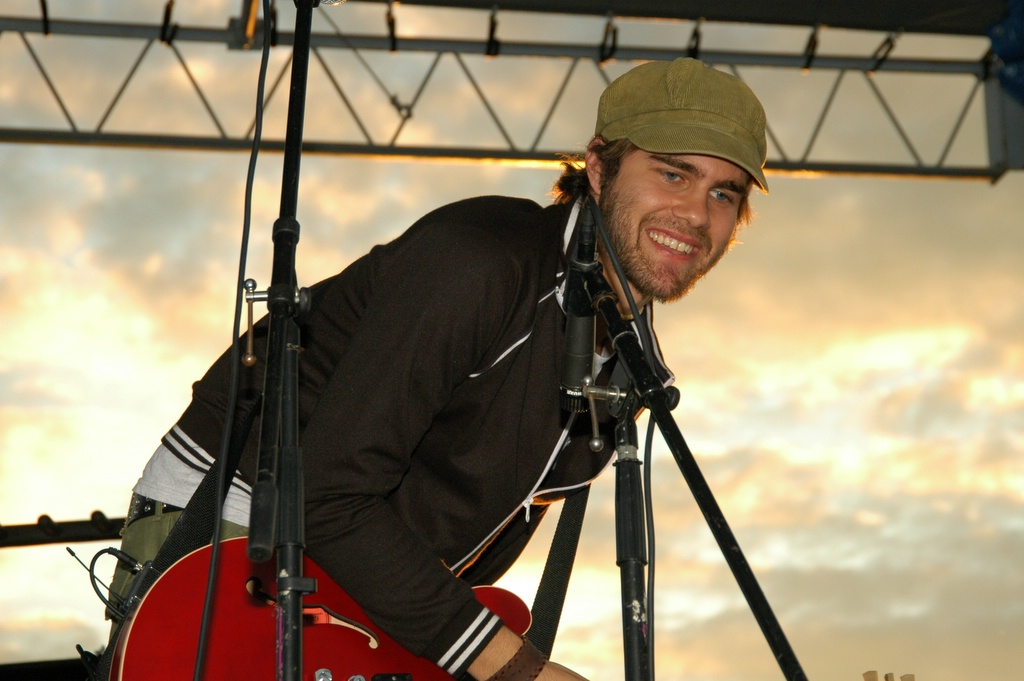
Tomas Kalnoky

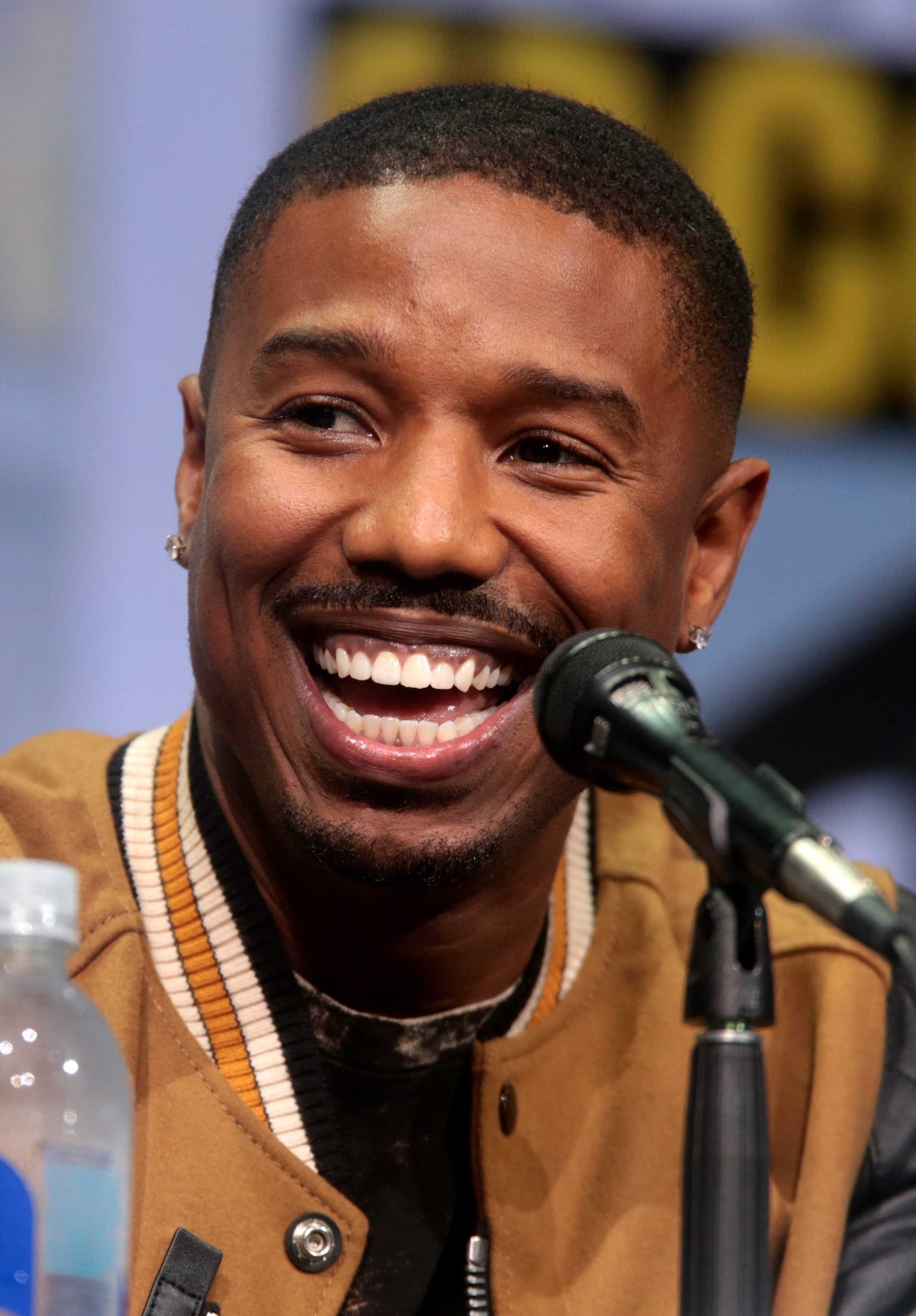
Michael B. Jordan

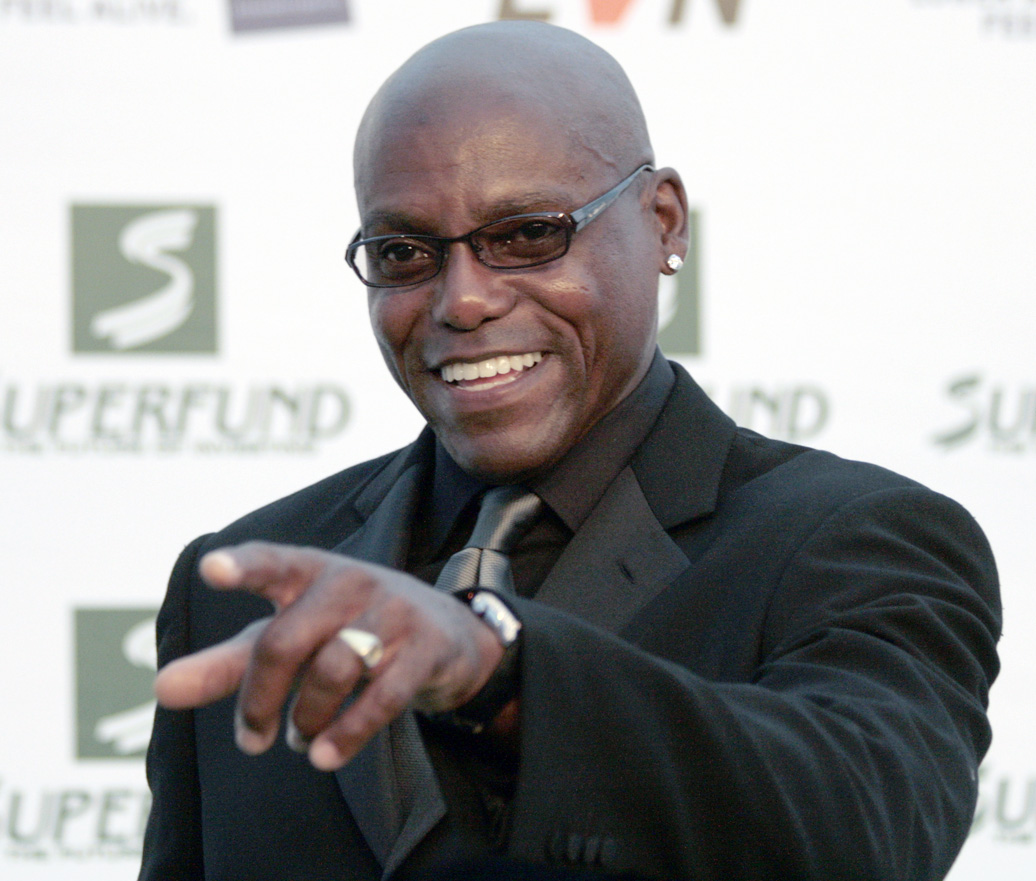
Carl Lewis

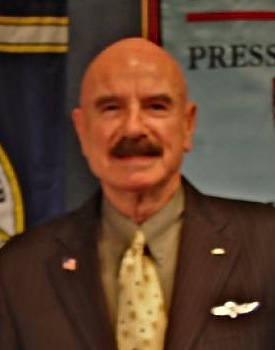
G. Gordon Liddy

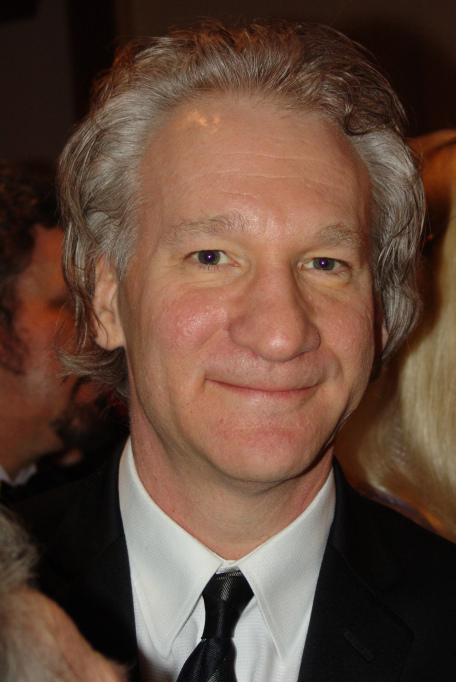
Bill Maher

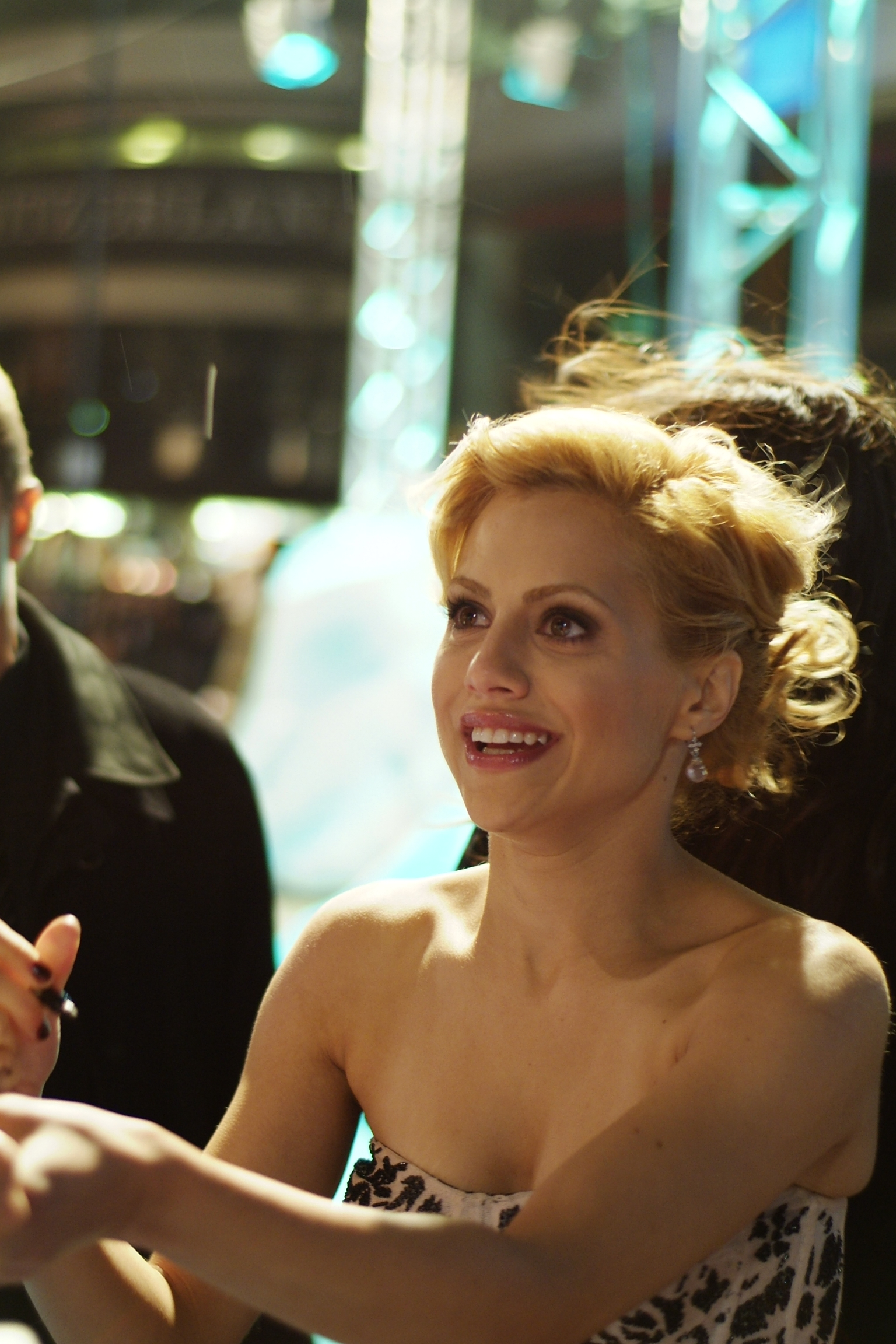
Brittany Murphy

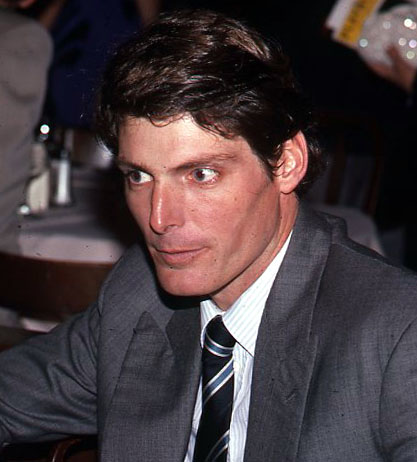
Christopher Reeve

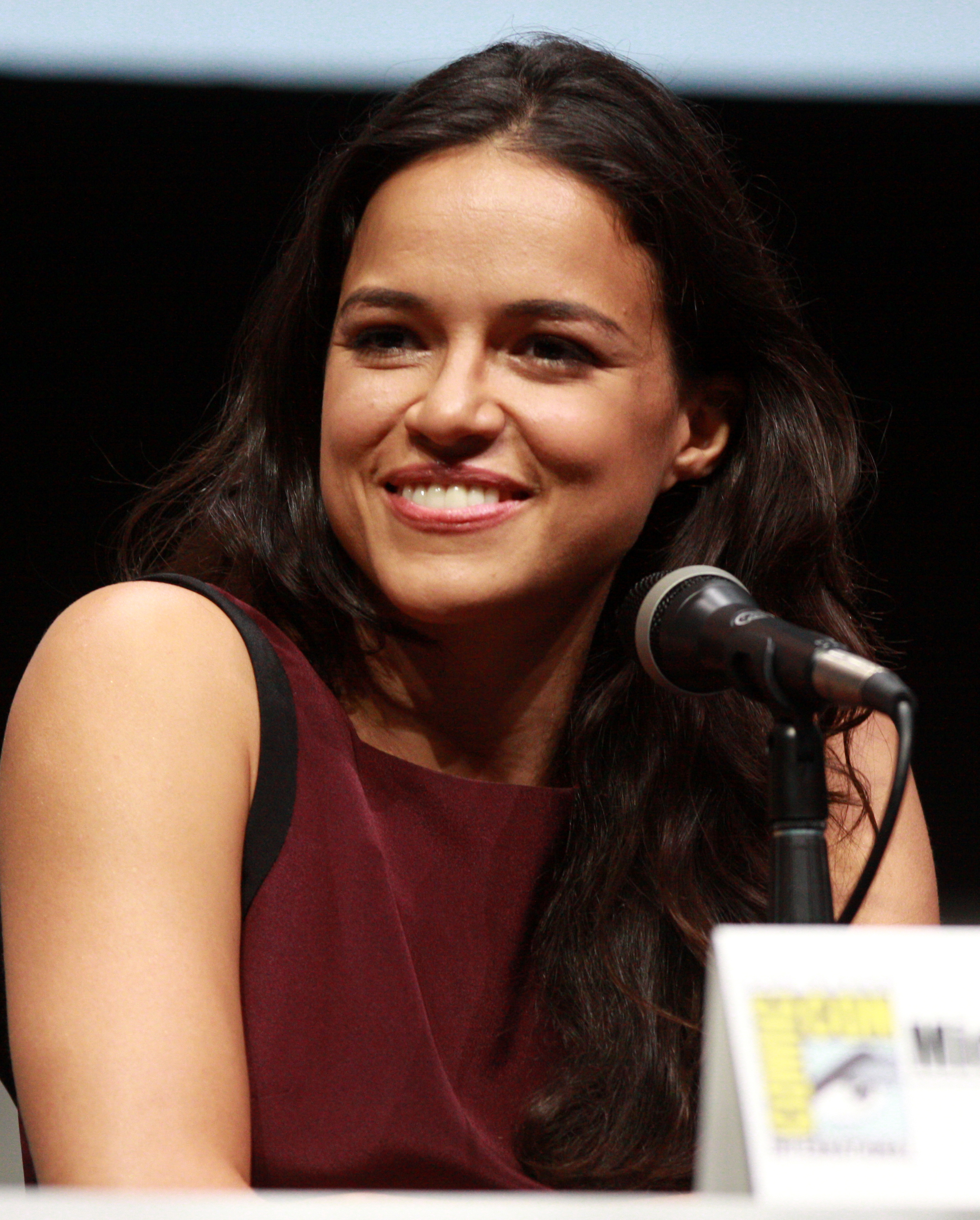
Michelle Rodriguez

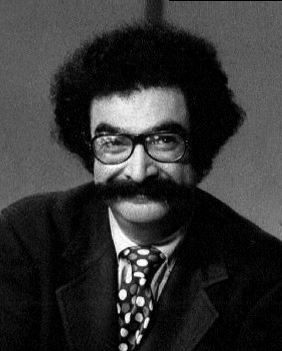
Gene Shalit

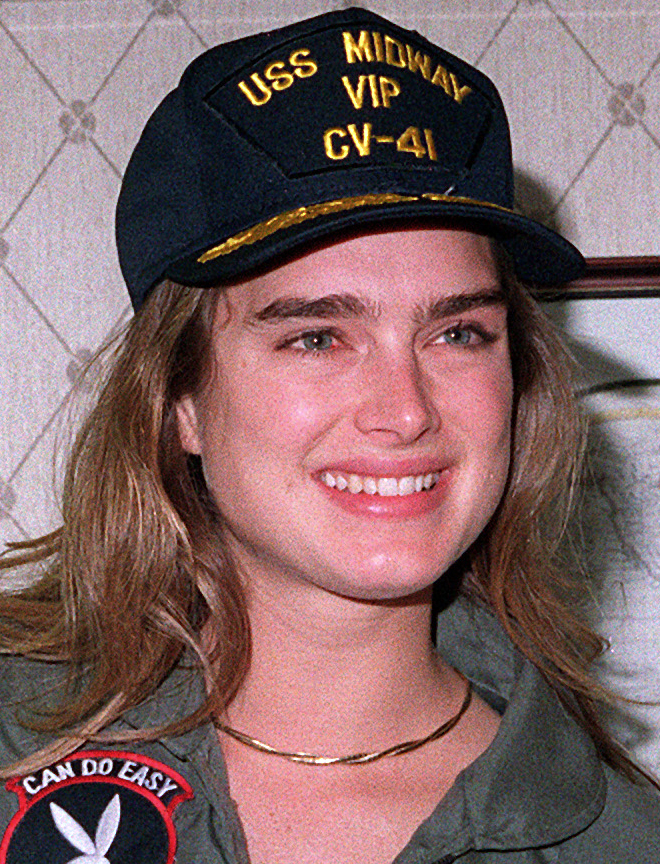
Brooke Shields

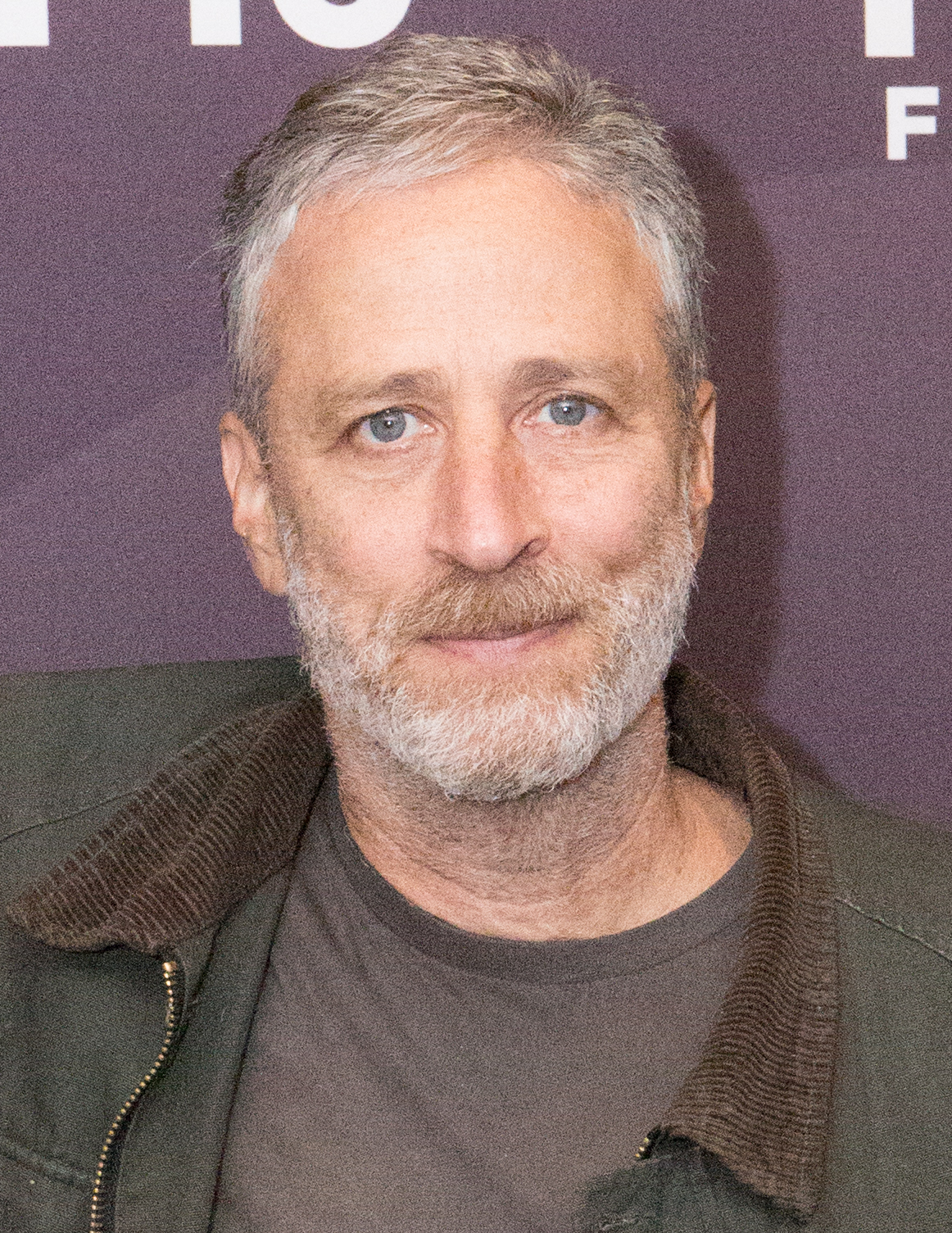
Jon Stewart

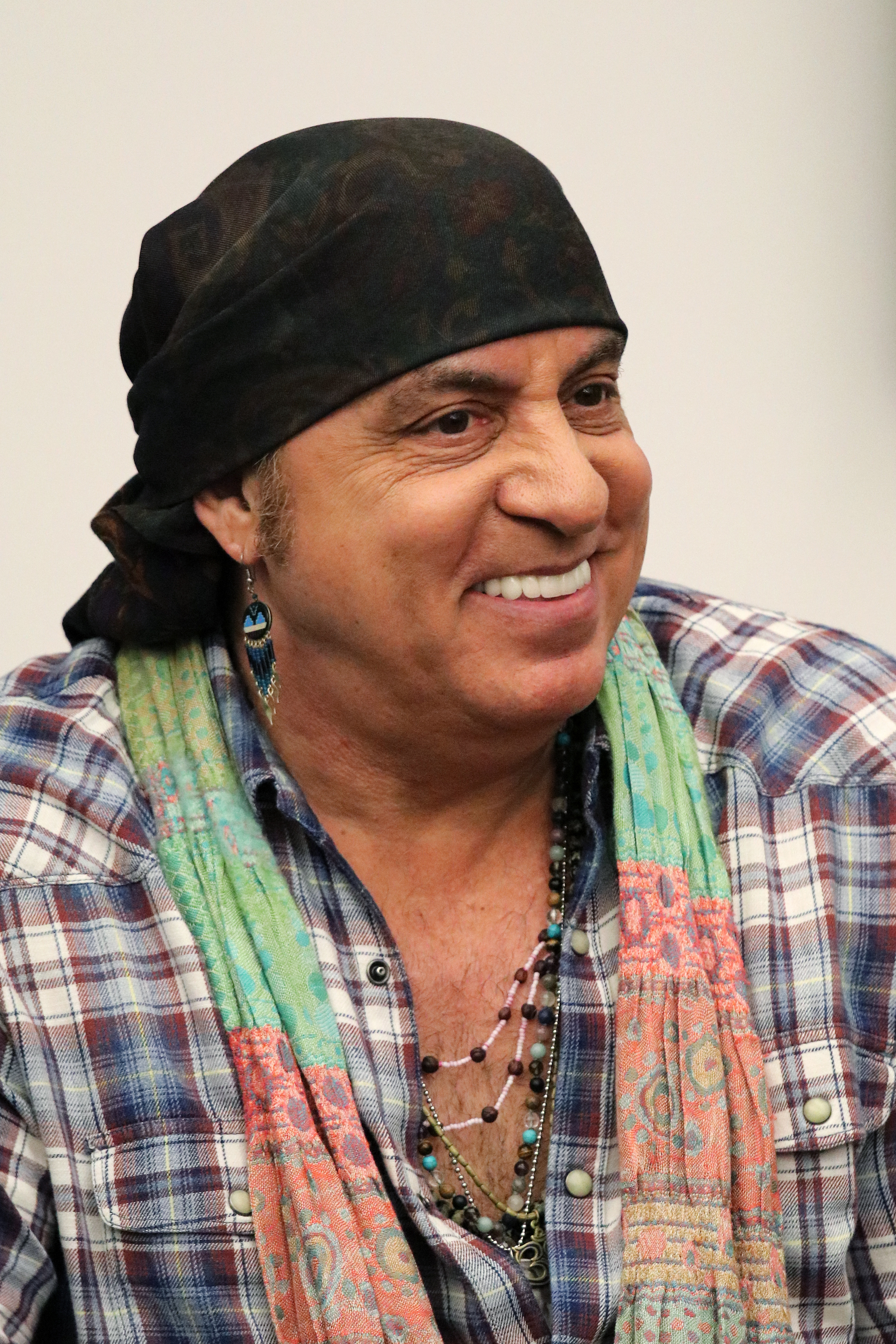
Steven Van Zandt

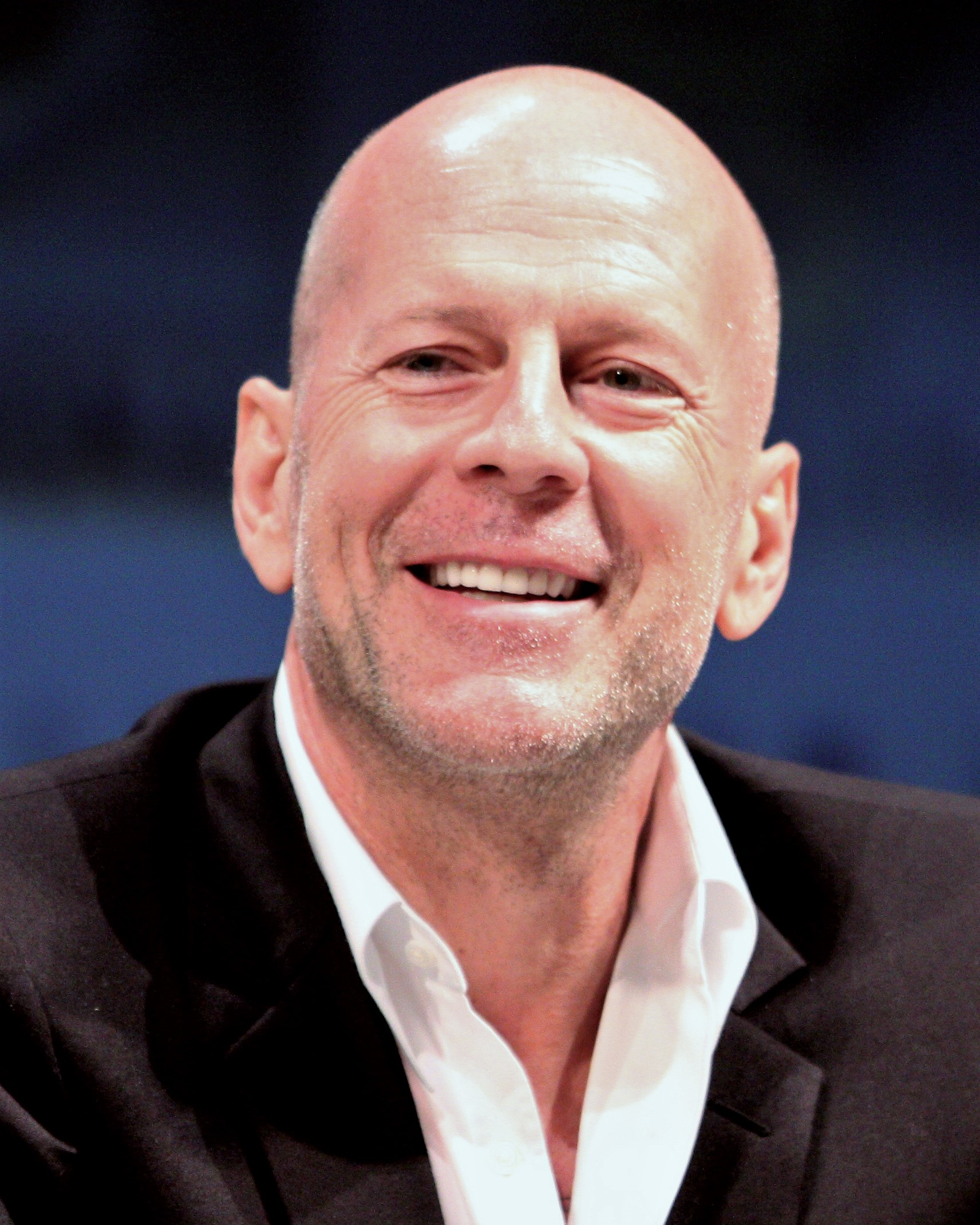
Bruce Willis

- Soren Sorensen Adams (1878–1963), inventor of the joy buzzer (Aarhus, Denmark, raised in Perth Amboy, died in Asbury Park)
- Juan Agudelo (born 1992), soccer player for the New York Red Bulls and the U.S. men's team (Colombia, raised in Barnegat)
- Akon (born 1973), platinum R&B singer (born in St. Louis, partly raised in Senegal, then moved to Jersey City)
- DJ Akademiks (born 1991), Jamaican-American podcaster, internet personality and live streamer (Jamaica, raised in New Brunswick)
- Monica Aksamit (born 1990), saber fencer and 2016 summer olympics bronze-medalist (New York City, raised in Morganville)
- Carlo Alban (born 1979), actor, Prison Break (Ecuador, raised in Sayreville)
- Jeff Anderson (born 1970), actor, Randal Graves in Kevin Smith's View Askewniverse (Connecticut, raised in Atlantic Highlands)
- Mark Attanasio, owner of the Milwaukee Brewers (The Bronx, raised in Tenafly)
- Trey Anastasio (born 1964), guitarist, composer, and vocalist for the rock band Phish (Fort Worth, raised in Princeton)
- Kyle Anderson (born 1993), forward for the San Antonio Spurs (New York City, raised in North Bergen and Fairview)
- Ben Bailey (born 1970), comedian, game show host Cash Cab (Bowling Green, KY, raised in Chatham)
- Oxiris Barbot, pediatrician, commissioner of health of the city of New York
- John Basilone (1916–1945), sergeant, USMC, Medal of Honor recipient (Buffalo, raised in Raritan)
- Joe Bastardi (born 1955), weather forecaster (Providence, Rhode Island, partly raised in Somers Point)
- Laura Benanti (born 1979), Tony-winning Broadway actress (New York City, raised in Kinnelon)
- Guy Benson (born 1985), journalist, pundit, Fox News contributor (Saudi Arabia, raised in Ridgewood)
- Moe Berg (1902–1972), MLB catcher and spy during World War II (New York City, raised in Newark)
- Steve Berman (born 1968), author (Philadelphia, raised in Cherry Hill)
- Bonnie Bernstein (born 1970), television and radio sportscaster (Brooklyn, raised in Howell)
- Ahmed Best (born 1973), voice actor, Jar Jar Binks in the Star Wars prequel trilogy (New York City, raised in Maplewood)
- Michael Ian Black (born 1971), comedian, actor, Ed, The State, Viva Variety (Chicago, raised in Hillsborough)
- Carson Block (born 1977), short-seller and investor
- Cory Booker (born 1969), politician, former mayor of Newark; current United States Senator (born in Washington, D.C., raised in Harrington Park)
- Anthony Bourdain (1956–2018), chef, author and television personality (New York City, raised in Leonia)
- James L. Brooks (born 1940), film and television producer and director (Brooklyn, raised in North Bergen)
- Joe Budden (born 1980), rap musician (Spanish Harlem, raised in Jersey City)
- Tisha Campbell-Martin (born 1968), actress (Oklahoma City, raised in Newark)
- Johnny Cannizzaro, actor, Jersey Boys, writer, producer (Brooklyn, raised in Holmdel)
- John Carlson (born 1990), NHL defenseman (Natick, MA, raised in Colonia)
- Luis Castillo (born 1983), NFL defensive end, formerly of the San Diego Chargers (Brooklyn, raised in Garfield)
- Kevin Chamberlin (born 1963), actor, Road to Perdition, Die Hard with a Vengeance (Baltimore, raised in Moorestown)
- Mona Charen (born 1957), columnist, political analyst, author (New York City, raised in Livingston)
- David Chase (born 1945), creator, The Sopranos (Mount Vernon, NY, raised in Clifton, North Caldwell)
- Chino XL (born 1971), rapper, actor (Bronx, raised in East Orange)
- Lauren Cohan (born 1982), actress, Maggie Greene on The Walking Dead (Philadelphia, partially raised in Cherry Hill)
- Rhys Coiro (born 1979), actor, Billy Walsh on Entourage (Calabria, Italy, raised in Princeton)
- Judith Ortiz Cofer (1952–2016), author (Hormigueros, PR, raised in Paterson)
- Doris Coley (1941–2000), musician and singer for The Shirelles (Goldsboro, NC, raised in Passaic)
- James Comey (born 1960), Director of the Federal Bureau of Investigation (Yonkers, raised in Allendale)
- Monica Crowley (born 1968), political pundit, former assistant secretary, U.S. State Department (Arizona, raised in Warren Township)
- Tom Cruise (born 1962), actor (Syracuse, NY, raised in Glen Ridge)
- Michael Cudlitz (born 1964), actor, Southland, The Walking Dead, Standoff (Long Island, raised in Lakewood)
- David Curtiss (born 2002), competitive swimmer (Yardley, PA, raised in Pennington and Hamilton)
- David DeJesus (born 1979), MLB outfielder (Brooklyn, raised in Manalapan Township)
- Kat DeLuna (born 1987), pop and R&B singer (Bronx, New York, partly raised in Newark)
- William Demarest (1892–1983), character actor (St. Paul, Minnesota, raised in New Bridge in Bergen County)
- Rosemarie DeWitt (born 1974), actress, United States of Tara, Standoff (Queens, raised in Hanover)
- Joey Diaz (born 1963), stand-up comedian, actor (Havana, Cuba, raised in North Bergen)
- Sean Doolittle (born 1986), relief pitcher for the Washington Nationals (Rapid City, SD, raised in Tabernacle)
- Sarah Jane Corson Downs (1822–1891), president, New Jersey Woman's Christian Temperance Union (Philadelphia; raised in Pennington)
- Karen Duffy (born 1961), model and actress (New York City, raised in Park Ridge)
- Tyler Ennis (born 1994), point guard for Hapoel Tel Aviv (Brampton, ON, raised in Newark)
- Tali Farhadian (born 1974/1975), former U.S. federal prosecutor (Englewood Cliffs)
- Andrew Fastow (born 1961), CFO at Enron, convicted felon (Washington, D.C., raised in New Providence)
- Linda Fiorentino (born 1958), actress (Philadelphia, raised in Turnersville)
- Oscar Fraley (1914–1994), co-author of Eliot Ness's memoir, The Untouchables (Philadelphia, raised in Woodbury)
- Lawrence Frank (born 1970), professional basketball coach (New York City, raised in Teaneck)
- Milton Friedman (1912–2006), econcomist, statistician, developed the Chicago school, Nobel prize winner (Brooklyn, raised in Rahway)
- Daisy Fuentes (born 1966), model and TV personality (Havana, Cuba, raised in Newark, Harrison)
- Junior Galette (born 1988), defensive end and linebacker for the New Orleans Saints (Port-au-Prince, Haiti, raised in Montvale)
- Jim Gary (1939–2006), sculptor (Sebastian, FL, raised in Colts Neck)
- Camille Grammer (born 1963), cast member on The Real Housewives of Beverly Hills (Newport Beach, CA, raised in Jersey City)
- Jesse Grupper (born 1997), Olympic rock climber (New York City, raised in Upper Montclair)
- Bob Guccione (1930–2010), founder and publisher of Penthouse magazine (Brooklyn, raised in Bergenfield)
- Vida Guerra (born 1980), model (Havana, raised in Perth Amboy)
- Valerie Harper (1939–2019), actress (Suffern, raised in Jersey City)
- Debbie Harry (born 1945), singer and actress (Miami, raised in Hawthorne)
- Anne Hathaway (born 1982), actress (born in Brooklyn, raised in Millburn)
- Ethan Hawke (born 1970), actor (Austin, Texas, partly raised in West Windsor)
- Bob Herbert (born 1945), op-ed columnist for The New York Times (Brooklyn, raised in Montclair)
- Orel Hershiser (born 1958), Cy Young-winning baseball pitcher and ESPN baseball analyst (Buffalo, New York, raised in Cherry Hill)
- Debra Hill (1950–2005), screenwriter, producer (born in Philadelphia, raised in Haddonfield)
- Will Hill (born 1990), safety for the Baltimore Ravens (Jacksonville, Florida, raised in West Orange)
- Jay Horwitz (born 1945), New York Mets executive
- Lloyd Huck (1922–2012), business executive and philanthropist (Brooklyn, raised in Nutley)
- Harold L. Humes (1926–1992), novelist, co-founder of The Paris Review (Douglas, Arizona, raised in Princeton)
- Toomas Hendrik Ilves (born 1953), president of Estonia (Stockholm, Sweden, raised in Leonia)
- Monte Irvin (1919–2016), HOF baseball player (Haleburg, Alabama, raised in Orange)
- Kyrie Irving (born 1992), point guard for the Brooklyn Nets (born in Australia, raised in West Orange)
- Sheena Iyengar (born 1969), professor at Columbia Business School, specializing in research on choice (born in Toronto, raised in Flushing, Queens, and Elmwood Park)
- Millie Jackson (born 1944), R&B/soul singer-songwriter (Thomson, Georgia, raised in Newark and Brooklyn)
- Sharpe James (1936–2025), New Jersey state senator and mayor of Newark, convicted criminal (born in Jacksonville, raised in Newark)
- Chris Jent (born 1970), NBA player, assistant coach for the Cleveland Cavaliers (Orange, CA, raised in Sparta)
- Joe Jonas (born 1989), singer, member of the Jonas Brothers (Casa Grande, raised in Wyckoff)
- Nick Jonas (born 1992), singer, member of the Jonas Brothers (Dallas, raised in Wyckoff)
- Brian Joo (born 1981), Korean singer (Los Angeles, raised in Absecon)
- Michael B. Jordan (born 1987), actor (Santa Ana, raised in Newark)
- Ryan Kalish (born 1988), outfielder with the Chicago Cubs (Los Angeles, raised in Shrewsbury)
- Tomas Kalnoky (born 1980), musician and frontman of Catch 22, Bandits of the Acoustic Revolution, Streetlight Manifesto, and the Pentimento Music Company (Prague raised in East Brunswick)
- Kevin Kelly (born 1952), founding executive editor of Wired magazine (born in Pennsylvania, raised in Westfield)
- Michael Kidd-Gilchrist (born 1993), small forward for the Charlotte Hornets (Philadelphia, raised in Somerdale)
- Ezra Koenig (born 1984), musician, Vampire Weekend (New York City, raised in North Jersey)
- Michael Landon (1936–1991), actor, Bonanza, Little House on the Prairie (Queens, New York raised in Collingswood)
- Ailee, real name Amy Lee (born 1989), Korean singer (Denver, Colorado, raised in Palisades Park and Leonia)
- Ted Leo (born 1970), indie rock musician (South Bend, Indiana, raised in Bloomfield)
- A. Leo Levin (1919–2015), law professor at the University of Pennsylvania Law School
- Samm Levine (born 1982), actor, Freaks and Geeks, Inglourious Basterds (Chicago, raised in Fort Lee)
- Carl Lewis (born 1961), track and field legend, nine-time Olympic gold medalist (born in Birmingham, Alabama, raised in Willingboro)
- Richard Lewis (born 1947), comedian, actor, Anything but Love, Curb Your Enthusiasm (Brooklyn, raised in Englewood)
- G. Gordon Liddy (1930–2021), chief operative for the White House Plumbers unit under the Nixon administration (Brooklyn, raised in Hoboken and West Caldwell)
- Naomi Cornelia Long Madgett (1923–2020), poet (Norfolk, Virginia, partly raised in East Orange)
- Bill Maher (born 1956), comedian, actor, TV personality, left wing pundit, Real Time with Bill Maher (New York City, raised in River Vale)
- Michelle Malkin (born 1970), conservative pundit (Philadelphia, raised in Absecon)
- Constantine Maroulis (born 1975), singer (New York City, raised in Wyckoff)
- Sam Mattis (born 1994), Olympic discus thrower
- Gene Mayer (born 1956), tennis player (Queens, raised in Wayne)
- Page McConnell (born 1963), songwriter and keyboardist with the rock band Phish (Philadelphia, raised in Basking Ridge)
- Devin McCourty (born 1987), free safety for the New England Patriots (Nyack, New York, raised in Montvale)
- John C. McGinley (born 1959), actor, Perry Cox on Scrubs (New York City, raised in Millburn)
- Lea Michele (born 1986), actress, Rachel Berry on Glee (Bronx, raised in Tenafly)
- Matt Mulhern (born 1960), actor, filmmaker, Major Dad (Philadelphia, raised in Montvale)
- Brittany Murphy (1977–2009), actress, King of the Hill, Happy Feet, 8 Mile (Atlanta, raised in Edison and Burbank, California)
- Jim Nantz (born 1959), sportscaster for CBS Sports (Charlotte, North Carolina, raised in Colts Neck Township)
- J. J. North, actress (Philadelphia, raised in New Jersey)
- Karen O (born 1978), lead singer of the Yeah Yeah Yeahs (born in South Korea, raised in Englewood)
- Christine O'Donnell (born 1969), 2010 Republican candidate for Senator of Delaware (Philadelphia, raised in Moorestown)
- Brian O'Halloran (born 1969), actor in Kevin Smith's View Askewniverse (Manhattan, partly raised in Old Bridge)
- Shaun O'Hara (born 1977), former center for the Cleveland Browns and New York Giants (Chicago, raised in Hillsborough Township)
- Rick Overton (born 1954), actor, comedian (Forest Hills, raised in Englewood)
- Kyle Palmieri (born 1991), hockey player (Smithtown, New York, raised in Montvale)
- Scott Patterson (born 1958), actor, Gilmore Girls, The Event, Aliens in America (Philadelphia, raised in Haddonfield)
- Piper Perabo (born 1976), actress, Cheaper by the Dozen (Dallas, raised in Toms River)
- Fernando Perez (born 1983), former Tampa Bay Rays outfielder, current San Francisco Giants coach
- Maxwell Perkins (1884–1947), editor for Ernest Hemingway, F. Scott Fitzgerald, and Thomas Wolfe (New York City, raised in Plainfield)
- Clarke Peters (born 1952), actor, Det. Lester Freamon on The Wire (New York City, raised in Englewood)
- Shaun Phillips (born 1981), outside linebacker for the San Diego Chargers (Philadelphia, raised in Willingboro Township)
- Maria Pitillo (born 1965), actress, Providence, Partners, Godzilla (Elmira, NY, raised in Mahwah)
- Carol Potter (born 1948), actress, Beverly Hills, 90210, Sunset Beach (New York City, raised in Tenafly)
- Dwight Muhammad Qawi (born 1953), former world boxing champion and Boxing Hall of Famer (Baltimore, raised in Camden)
- Becky Quick (born 1972), co-anchorwoman of CNBC's Squawk Box (born in Minneapolis, raised in Medford)
- Anna Quindlen (born 1953), author, journalist, and Pulitzer Prize-winning columnist (Philadelphia, graduated from South Brunswick High School in South Brunswick)
- B. J. Raji (born 1986), nose tackle for the Green Bay Packers (New York City, raised in Washington Township)
- Christopher Reeve (1952–2004), actor (New York City, raised in Princeton)
- Shirley Alston-Reeves (born Shirley Owens, 1941), lead singer of The Shirelles (raised in Passaic)
- Christina Ricci (born 1980), actress (Santa Monica, CA, raised in Montclair)
- Cameron Richardson (born 1979), actress and model, Cover Me, Point Pleasant, Alvin and the Chipmunks (Baton Rouge, raised in Old Bridge Township)
- Dennis Ritchie (1941–2011), computer scientist who created the C programming language and co-created Unix (Bronxville, NY, raised in Summit)
- Ian Roberts (born 1965), actor, comedian, Upright Citizens Brigade, Reno 911! (Queens, New York, raised in Secaucus)
- Michelle Rodriguez (born 1978), actress, Avatar, the Fast and the Furious movies, S.W.A.T. (Bexar County, Texas, partly raised in Jersey City)
- Julie Roginsky (born 1973), Democratic Party strategist and Fox News contributor (Moscow, Russia, partially raised in Plainsboro)
- Howie Roseman (born 1975), general manager for the Philadelphia Eagles (Brooklyn, raised in Marlboro)
- Jeffrey Rosen, billionaire businessman
- Carl Sagan (1934–1996), astronomer, astrochemist and author (Ithaca, NY, raised in Rahway)
- Samardo Samuels (born 1989), player for the Cleveland Cavaliers (Trelawny Parish, Jamaica, raised in Newark)
- Gabe Saporta (born 1979), singer and musician, currently for the pop rock band Cobra Starship (Montevideo, raised in Springfield Township)
- Susan Sarandon (born 1946), actress (New York City, raised in Edison)
- Jessica Savitch (1947–1983), television journalist (Kennett Square, PA, partly raised in Margate City)
- Adam Schlesinger (1967–2020), musician (Fountains of Wayne), songwriter, producer, arranger (Manhattan, raised in Montclair)
- Jon Seda (born 1970), actor, Homicide: Life on the Street, Kevin Hill, Close to Home (New York City, raised in Clifton)
- Richie Scheinblum (1942–2021), MLB All Star outfielder (South Bronx, New York City, raised in Englewood)
- Gene Shalit (1926–2026), film critic of NBC's Today (New York City, raised in Morristown)
- Brooke Shields (born 1965), actress, Suddenly Susan (New York City, raised in Englewood)
- Andrew Shue (born 1967), actor, Melrose Place (Wilmington, Delaware, raised in South Orange)
- Elisabeth Shue (born 1963), actress, Back to the Future Part II (Wilmington, Delaware, raised in South Orange)
- George P. Shultz (1920–2021). secretary of state, secretary of the treasury, director of the Office of Management and Budget, and secretary of labor (New York City, raised in Englewood)
- Bryan Singer (born 1965), film director (New York City, raised in Princeton Junction)
- Kiki Smith (born 1954), artist and sculptor; her father was the sculptor Tony Smith (born in West Germany, raised in South Orange from infancy to high school)
- Patti Smith (born 1946), rock musician (Chicago, raised in Woodbury)
- David Smukler (1914–1971), NFL football player
- Lawrence Solan (1952–2024), Don Forchelli Professor of Law and director of the Center for the Study of Law, Language and Cognition at Brooklyn Law School
- John Spencer (1946–2005), actor, The West Wing, L.A. Law, The Rock (New York City, raised in Totowa)
- Steven Spielberg (born 1946), legendary Hollywood director and producer (Cincinnati, partly raised in Haddon Township)
- David Stern (1942–2020), NBA commissioner, member of the Basketball Hall of Fame (New York City, raised in Teaneck)
- Jon Stewart (born 1962), comedian, actor and television personality (New York City, raised in Lawrence Township)
- SZA, real name Solana Rowe (born 1989), PBR&B singer-songwriter, signed to Top Dawg Entertainment (St. Louis, Missouri, raised in Maplewood)
- Jack Tatum (1948–2010), NFL safety primarily with the Oakland Raiders (Cherryville, North Carolina, raised in Passaic)
- Joseph Hooton Taylor Jr. (born 1941), Nobel Prize-winning astrophysicist (Philadelphia, raised in Cinnaminson)
- Lance Thomas (born 1988), player for the New Orleans Hornets (Brooklyn, New York, raised in Scotch Plains)
- Roger Y. Tsien (1952–2016), Nobel Prize–winning biochemist (New York City, raised in Livingston)
- Steven Van Zandt (born 1950), rock musician, actor, The Sopranos (Winthrop, MA, raised in Middletown)
- Alan Veingrad (born 1963), NFL football player (Brooklyn, New York, raised in Elizabeth)
- Bruce Vilanch (born 1948), comedy writer (New York City, raised in Paterson)
- Frank Vincent (1937–2017), actor (North Adams, MA, raised in Jersey City)
- Voltaire (born 1967), musician (Havana, Cuba)
- Rodney Wallace (born 1981), mixed martial artist (Bamberg, South Carolina, raised in Passaic)
- Carl B. Weinberg, economist, founder of High Frequency Economics (Bronx, raised in Teaneck)
- John C. Whitehead (1922–2015), banker, civil servant, chairman of the Lower Manhattan Development Corporation (Evanston, Illinois, raised in Montclair)
- Brian Williams (born 1959), disgraced anchor of NBC Nightly News (Elmira, New York, partly raised in Middletown)
- Bruce Willis (born 1955), actor (Idar-Oberstein, born in Germany, raised in Penns Grove)
- Scott Wolf (born 1968), actor, Party of Five, Everwood, The Nine (Boston, raised in West Orange)
- Teresa Wright (1918–2005), Oscar-winning actress, The Best Years of Our Lives, The Pride of the Yankees (New York City, raised in Maplewood)

== Born and raised elsewhere, live(d) in New Jersey ==
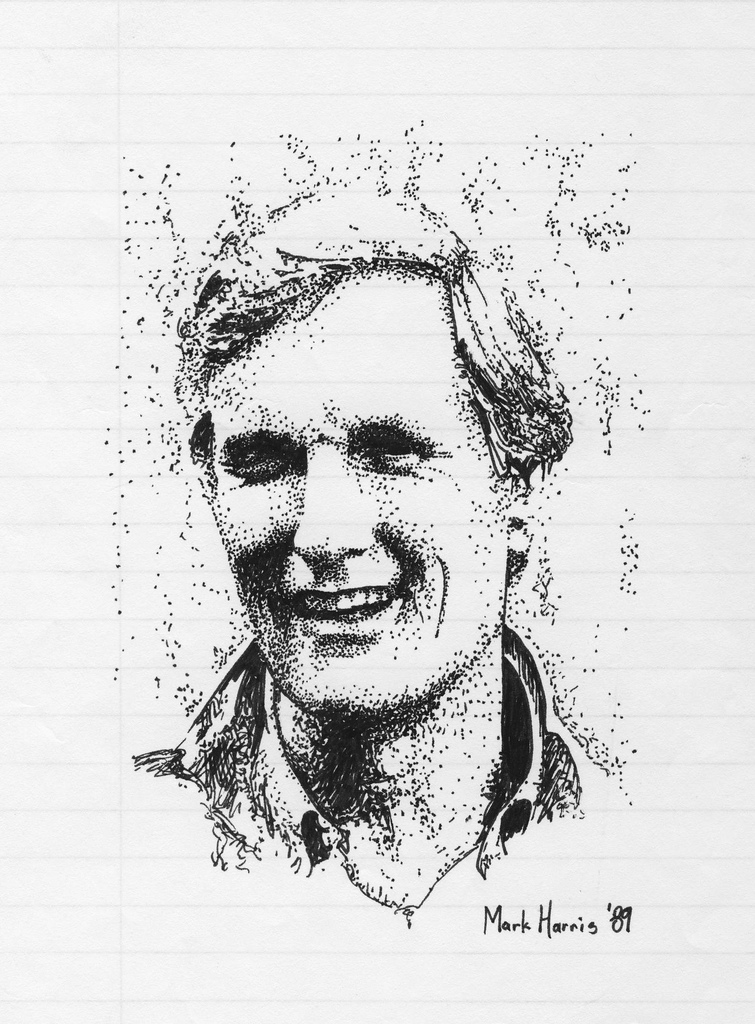
Alan Alda

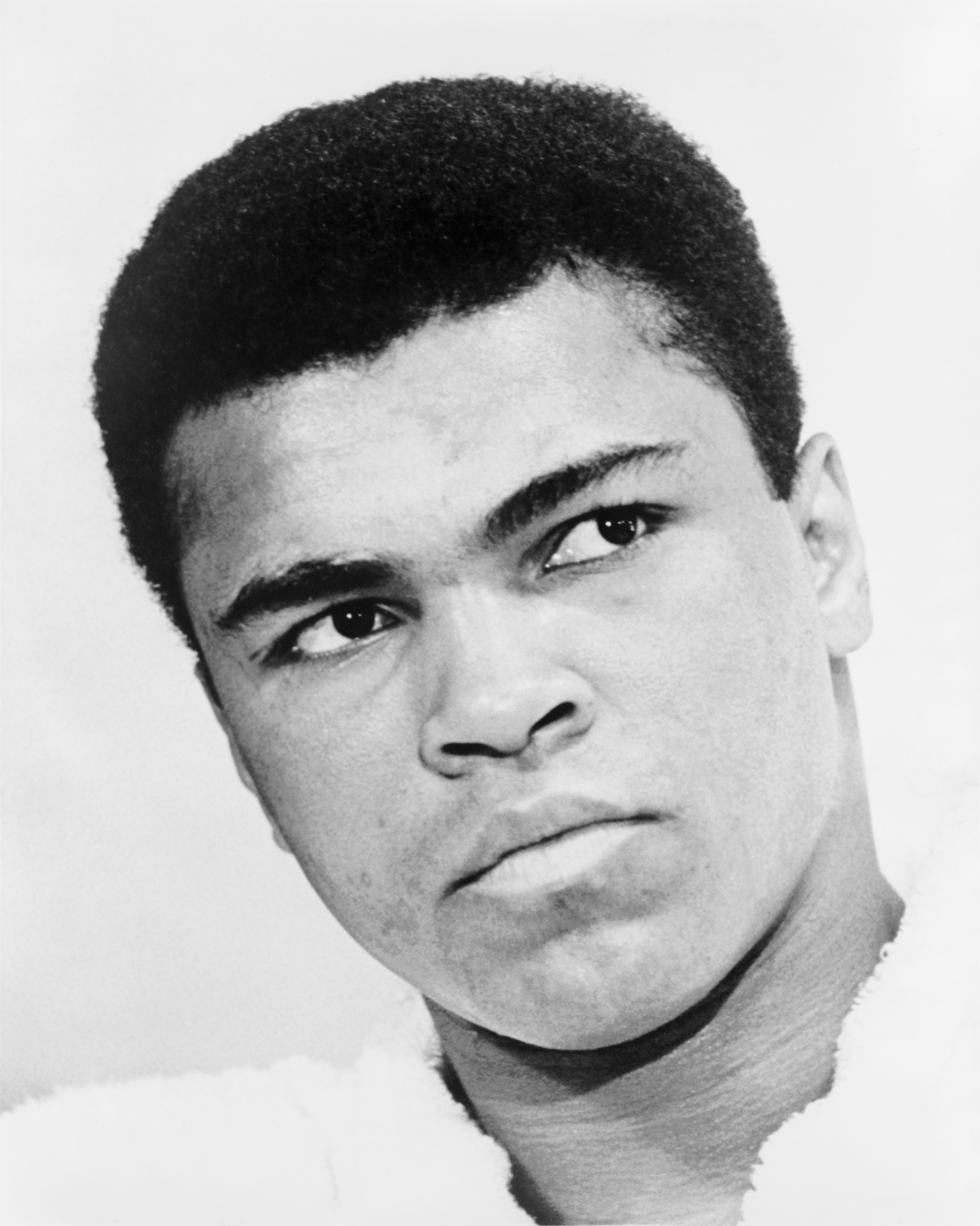
Muhammad Ali

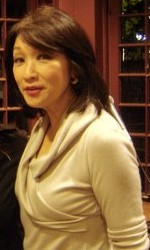
Connie Chung

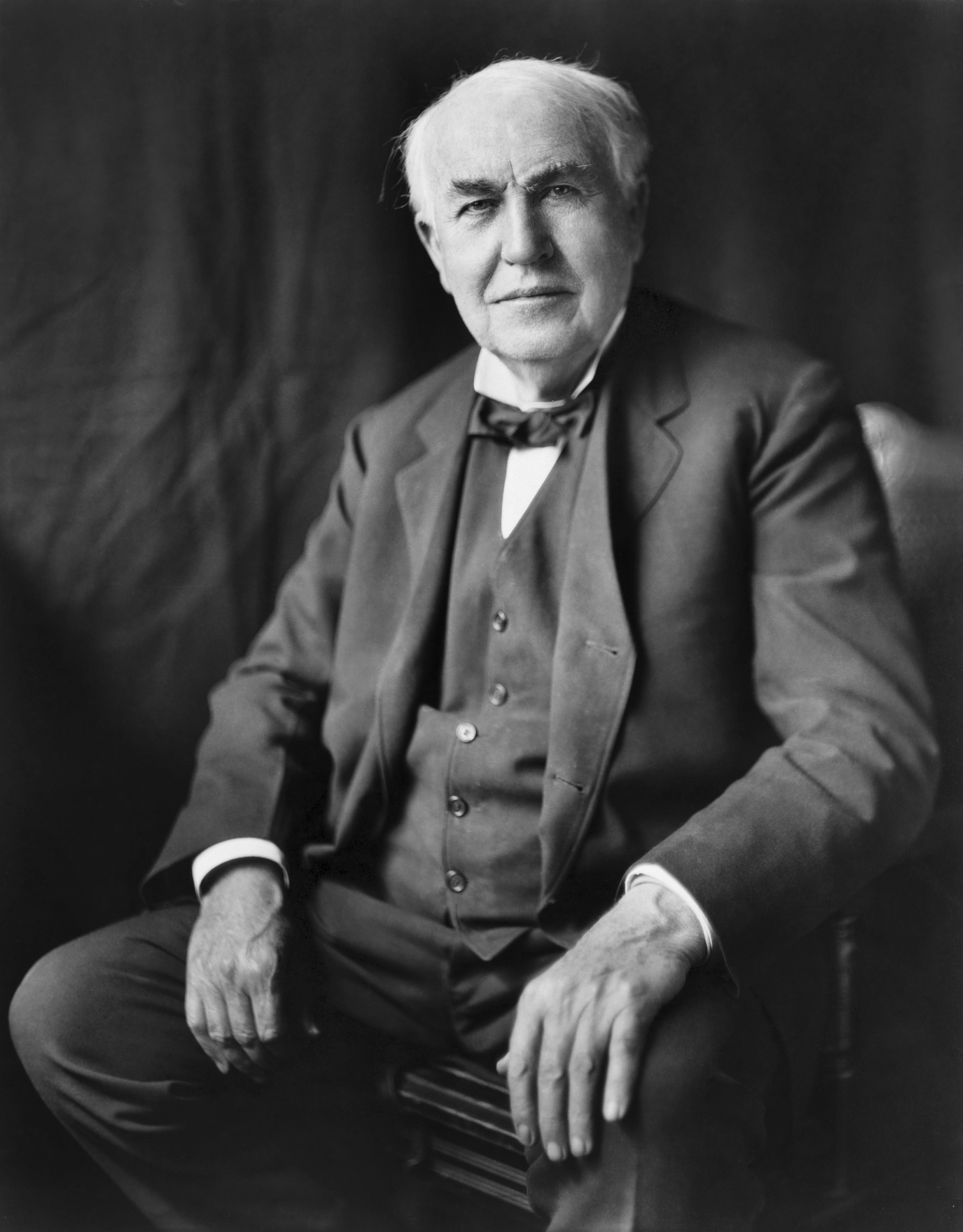
Thomas Edison

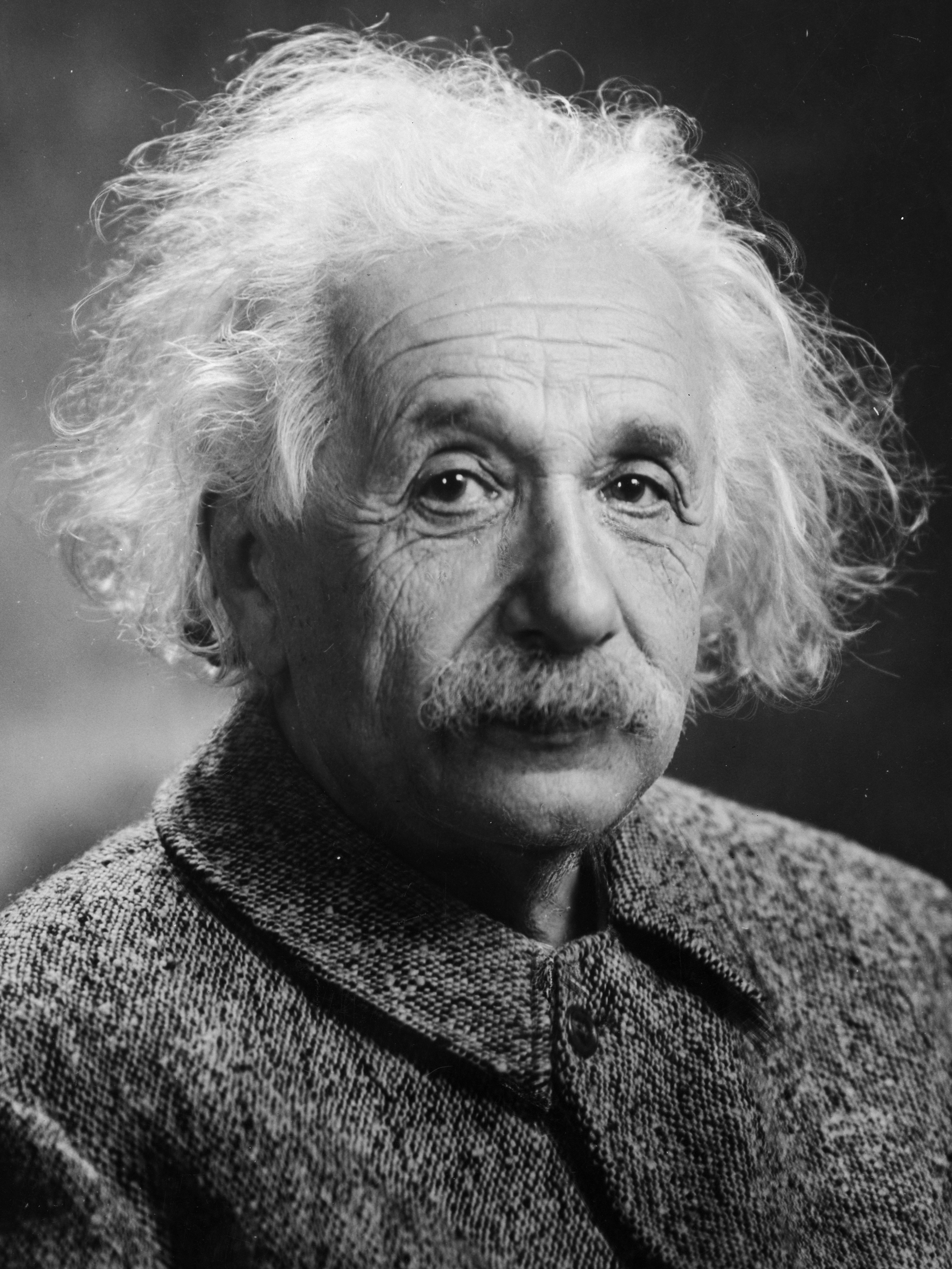
Albert Einstein

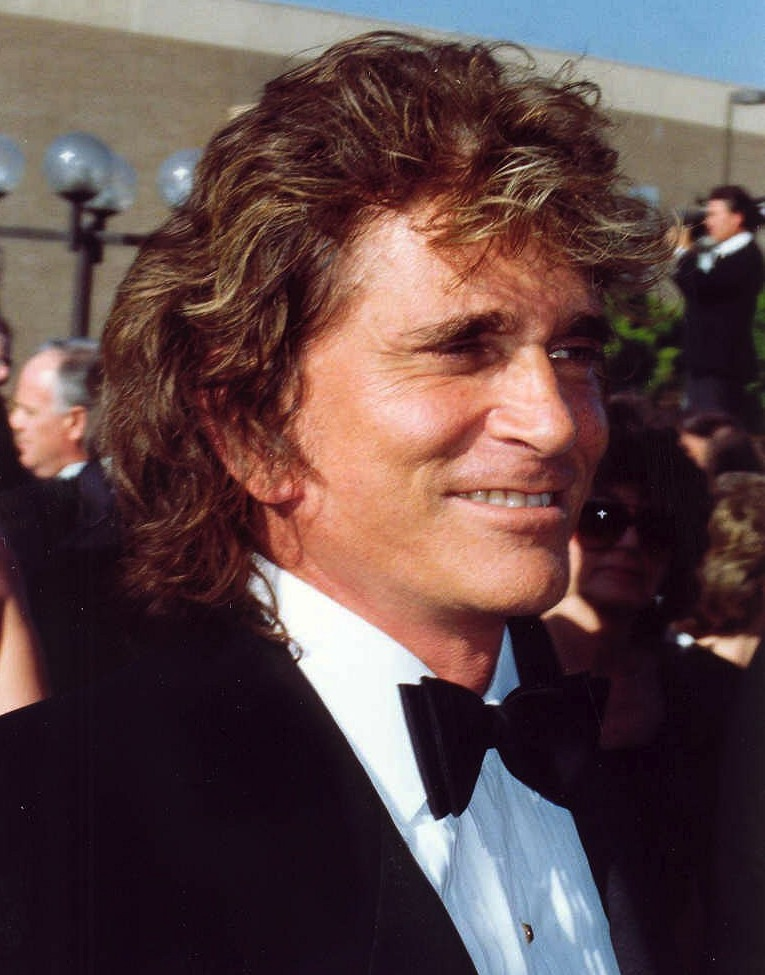
Michael Landon

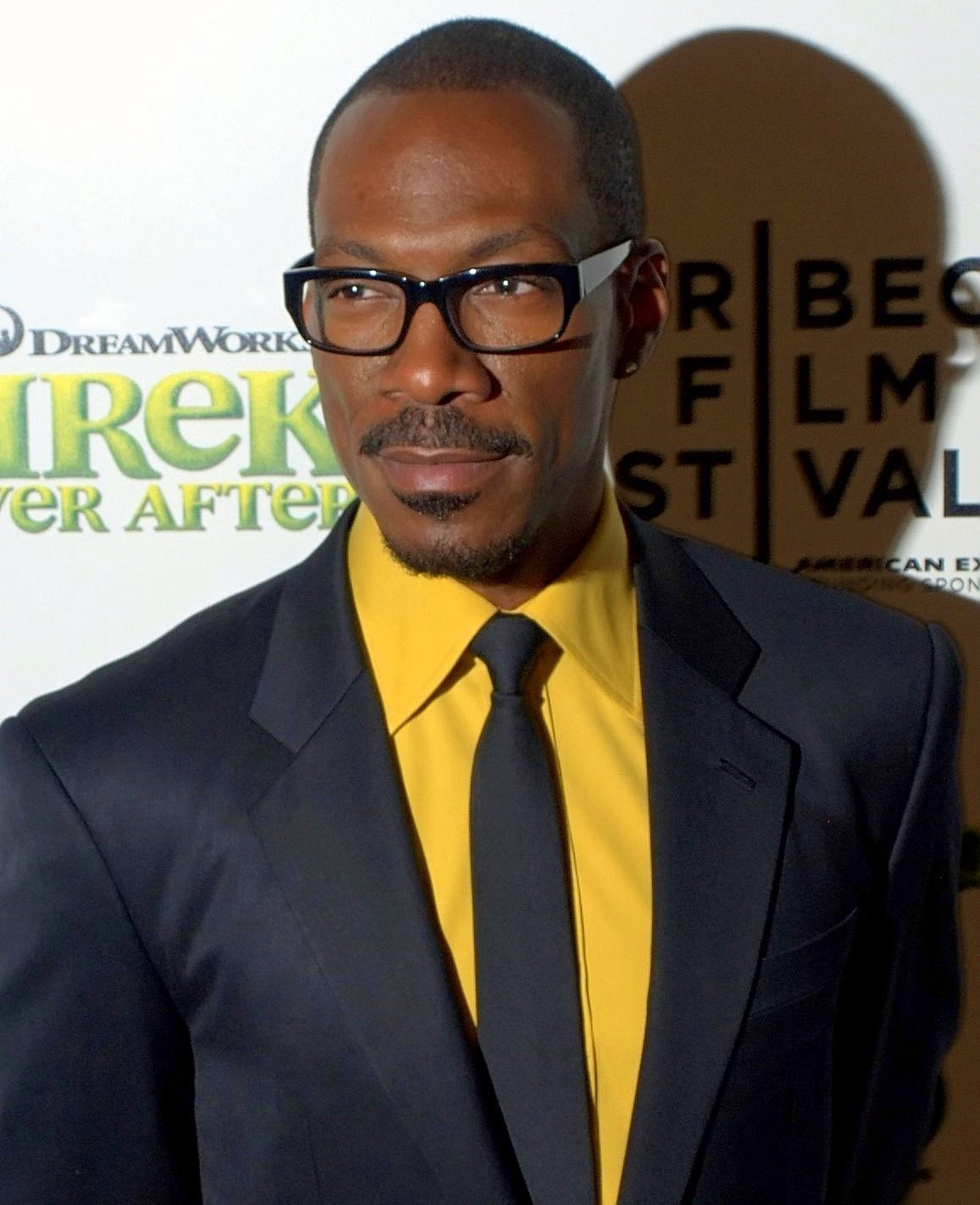
Eddie Murphy

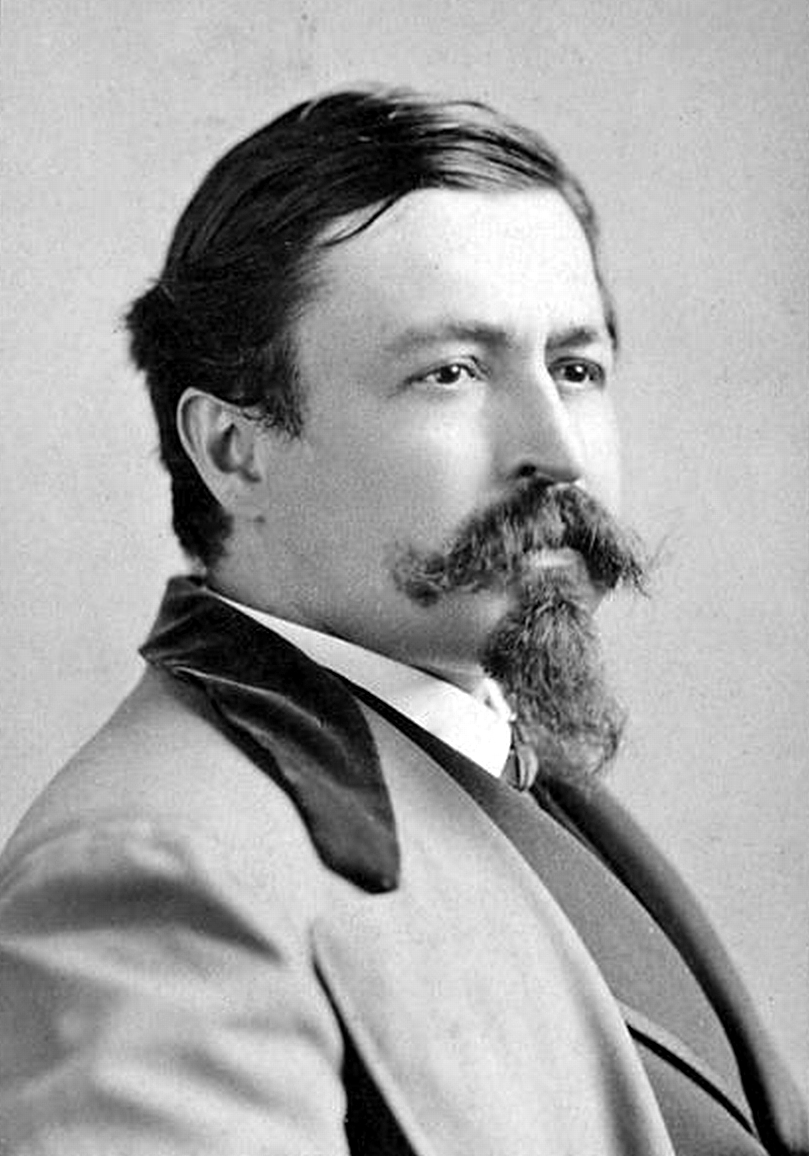
Thomas Nast

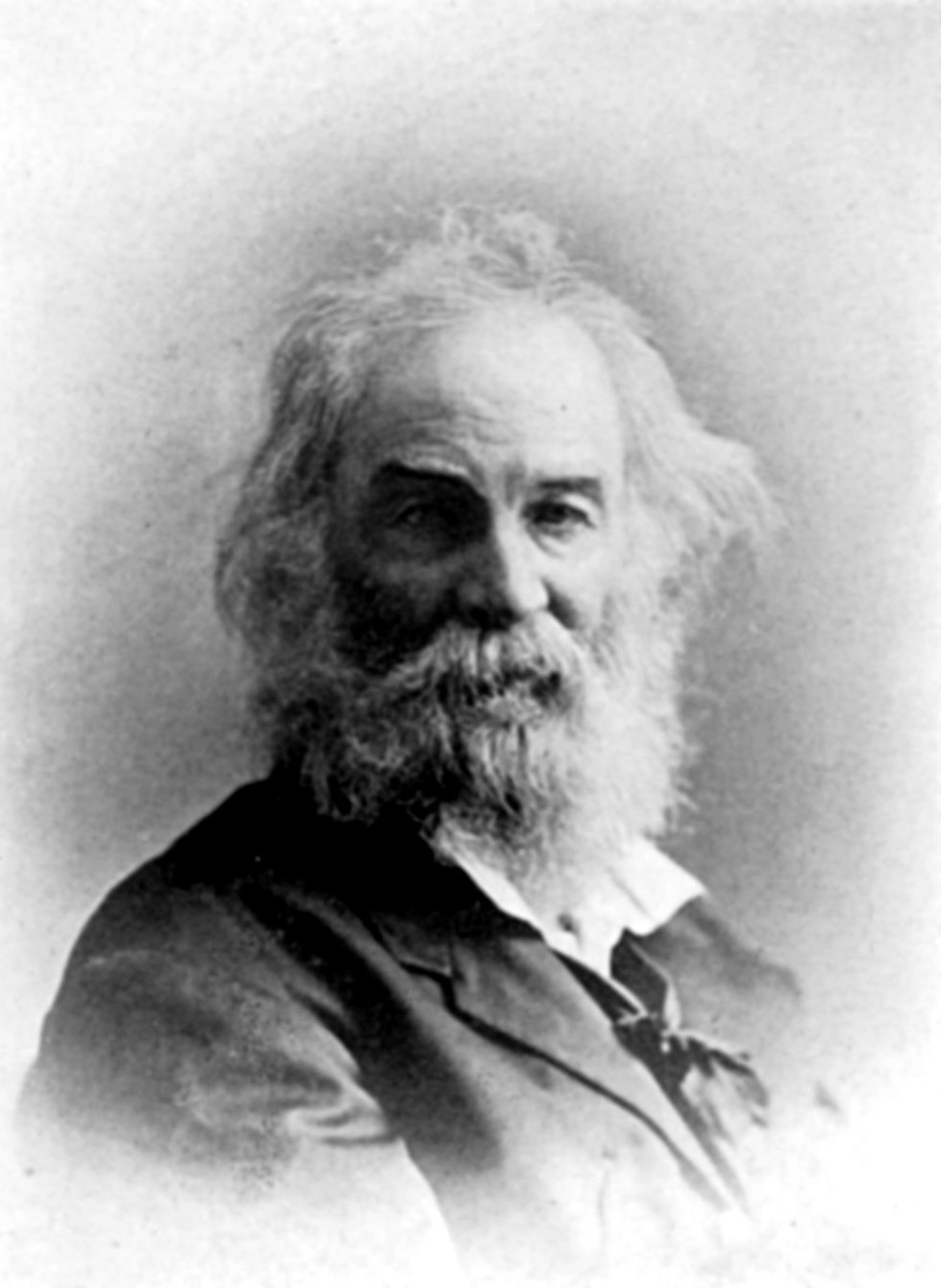
Walt Whitman

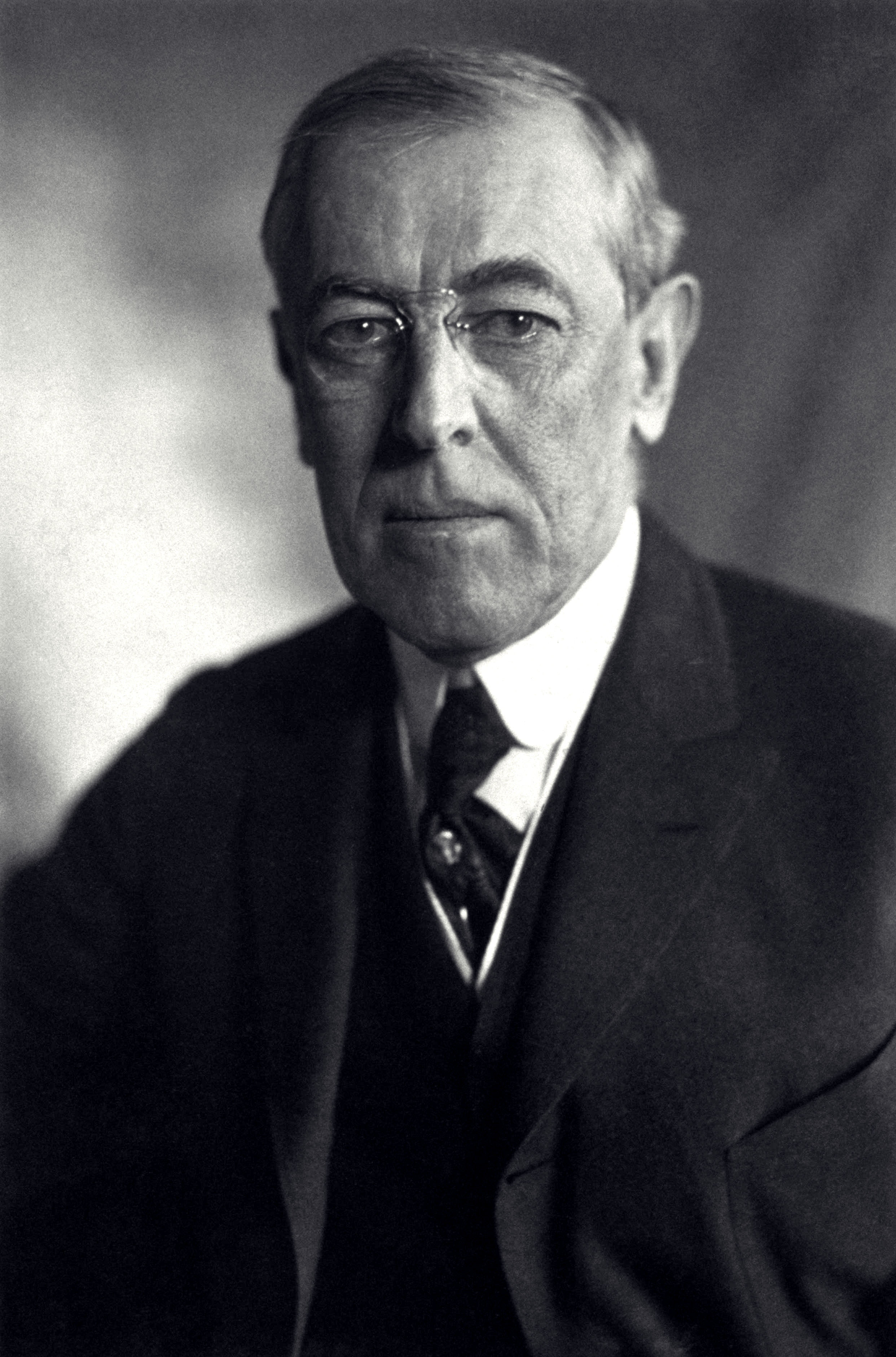
Woodrow Wilson

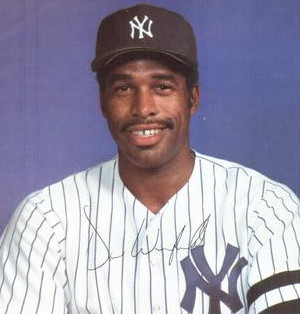
Dave Winfield

- Danny Aiello (born New York City), lived in Saddle River
- Alan Alda (born Manhattan, New York City), lives in Leonia
- Muhammad Ali (born Louisville, Kentucky), lived in Cherry Hill
- Paul Anka (Ottawa, Ontario, Canada), lives in Tenafly
- Yael Averbuch (born 1986), soccer player, U.S. women's team, general manager of NJ/NY Gotham FC (New York City, raised in Montclair)
- AZ (born Brooklyn, New York City), lives in Englewood
- Brian Baldinger (born Pittsburgh), lives in Cherry Hill
- Jesse Barfield (born Joliet, Illinois), lives in Tenafly
- Yogi Berra (born St. Louis, Missouri), lived in Montclair
- George Benson (born Pittsburgh), lives in Englewood
- Mary J. Blige (born New York City), lives in Cresskill
- Shmuley Boteach (born Los Angeles), lives in Englewood
- Andre Braugher (born Chicago, Illinois), lived in South Orange
- Jim Bunning (born Southgate, Kentucky), lives in Cherry Hill
- Nate Burleson (born 1981 in Calgary, Alberta, lives in Ridgewood
- Jim Byrnes (born St. Louis, Missouri), lives in Allendale
- Harriet Frances Carpenter (born Lyons, Iowa), lived in Millington
- Harry Carson (born Florence, South Carolina), lives in Franklin Lakes
- Vince Carter (born Daytona Beach, Florida), lives in Saddle River
- Sarah Chang (born Philadelphia), lives in Cherry Hill
- Connie Chung (born Washington, D.C.), lives in Middletown
- Mary Higgins Clark (born New York City), lived in Saddle River
- Bobby Clarke (born Flin Flon, Manitoba), lives in Cherry Hill
- Alon Cohen (born Israel), lives in Tenafly
- Stephen Colbert (born Charleston, South Carolina), lives in Montclair
- Sean Combs ("Diddy") (born New York City), lives in Alpine
- Lotta Crabtree (1847–1924), actress, comedian, philanthropist (born New York City), lived in Hopatcong
- Peter Criss (born Brooklyn, New York), lives in Wall Township
- Celia Cruz (born Havana, Cuba), lived in Fort Lee
- Johnny Damon (born Fort Riley, Kansas), lives in Ridgewood
- Damon Dash (born New York City), lives in Alpine
- Darryl Dawkins (born Orlando, Florida), lives in Marlboro
- Lou Dobbs (born Texas, lives in Wantage)
- Steve Doocy (born Algona, Iowa), lives in Wyckoff
- Thomas Edison (born Milan, Ohio), lived in Newark and West Orange
- Albert Einstein (born Ulm, Germany), lived in Princeton
- Halim El-Dabh (born Cairo, Egypt), lives in Cresskill
- Missy Elliott, real name Melissa Elliott (born Portsmouth, Virginia), lives in Kinnelon
- Jeff Feagles (born Anaheim, CA), lives in Ridgewood
- Althea Gibson (born Clarendon County, South Carolina), lived in East Orange
- Lior Haramaty (born Israel), lives in Tenafly
- Harry Harrison (1930–2020) born in Chicago, Illinois, Radio Host, lived in Norwood
- Bobby Hebb (born Nashville, Tennessee), lives in Cresskill
- Sarah Hirshland (born 1975), chief executive officer of the United States Olympic Committee
- Celeste Holm (1917–2012), Oscar-winning actress (born in Manhattan, lived in Long Valley)
- Sam Huff (born Morgantown, West Virginia), lives in Franklin Lakes
- Jay-Z (born Brooklyn, New York City), lives in Alpine
- Tommy John (born Terre Haute, Indiana), lives in Franklin Lakes
- Michael Johns (born Allentown, Pennsylvania), lives in Deptford
- Jim Jones (born New York City), rapper, lives in Fair Lawn
- Kristine Johnson, (born 1972 in Angeles City, Philippines), news presenter, lives in Upper Saddle River
- Zab Judah (born New York City), lives in Teaneck
- Kitty Kallen (born Philadelphia), lives in Englewood
- Sachidananda Kangovi (born Bangalore, India), lives in West Windsor
- Jevon Kearse (born Fort Myers, Florida), lives in Moorestown
- Jason Kidd (born San Francisco, California), lives in Saddle River
- Lil' Kim (born Brooklyn, New York City), lives in Alpine
- Bernard King (born New York City), lives in Franklin Lakes
- Michael Landon (born Queens, New York City), lived in Collingswood
- Phoebe Laub (born New York City), lives in Teaneck
- Bettye LaVette (born Muskegon, Michigan), lives in West Orange
- Shulem Lemmer (born Borough Park, Brooklyn, New York City), lives in Toms River, singer
- Heather Locklear (born Westwood, Los Angeles), lives in Wayne
- Mario (born Baltimore, Maryland), lives in Teaneck
- Tino Martinez (born Tampa, Florida), lives in Tenafly
- Fred Mascherino (born Philadelphia), lives in Union
- Don Mattingly (born Evansville, Indiana), lives in Tenafly
- Darryl "D.M.C." McDaniels (born New York City), lives in Wayne
- Bob McGrath (1932–2022) (born Ottawa, Illinois), lives in Teaneck
- Donovan McNabb (born Chicago, Illinois), lives in Moorestown
- Bob Menne, born and lives in Demarest
- Eddie Murphy (born New York City), lives in Englewood
- Thomas Nast (1840–1902), caricaturist, editorial cartoonist (born in Landau, Germany, lived in Morristown)
- Clarence Charles Newcomer (1923–2005), federal judge (district court), lived in Stone Harbor
- Richard Milhous Nixon (1913–1994) (born Yorba Linda, California), lived in Saddle River
- Edward Mosberg (1926–2022), Polish American Holocaust survivor, educator, and philanthropist (Randolph)
- Tina Nordström (born Valluv, Skåne County in Sweden), lives in Englewood Cliffs
- Mehmet Oz (born Cleveland), lived in and maintains ties to Cliffside Park, now lives in Huntington Valley, PA
- Randal Pinkett (born Philadelphia), lives in Somerset
- Maury Povich (born Washington, D.C.), lives in Middletown
- Aidan Quinn (born Rockford, Illinois), lives in Englewood
- Willie Randolph (born Holly Hill, South Carolina), lives in Franklin Lakes
- Larry Ray (born 1959), convicted criminal (sex trafficking), lives in Piscataway
- William P. Richardson (1864–1945), co-founder and first Dean of Brooklyn Law School, lived in Morristown
- Geraldo Rivera (born New York City), lived in Middletown
- Sylvia Robinson (born New York City), lives in Englewood
- Chris Rock (born Andrews, South Carolina), lives in Alpine
- Jeremy Roenick (born Boston), lives in Moorestown
- Jimmy Rollins (born Oakland, California), lives in Woolwich Township
- Ja Rule (born New York City), lives in Saddle River
- Lucy Mercer Rutherfurd (1891–1948), socialite, mistress of Franklin D. Roosevelt (born in Washington, DC, lived in Allamuchy)
- CC Sabathia (born Vallejo, California), lives in Alpine
- Tito Santana, professional wrestler (born Mission, Texas), lives in Roxbury
- Michel Sebastiani (born 1937 in France), Olympic fencing coach and member of the US Fencing Association Hall of Fame, lives in Princeton
- Gary Sheffield (born Tampa, Florida), lives in Alpine
- Lito Sheppard (born Jacksonville, Florida), lives in Moorestown
- Mikie Sherrill (born 1972 in Alexandria, Virginia), lives in Montclair
- Brooke Shields (born New York City), lives in Englewood
- Joseph Simmons (born New York City), lives in Saddle River
- Kimora Lee Simmons (born St. Louis, Missouri), lives in Saddle River
- Russell Simmons (born New York City), lives in Saddle River
- Phil Simms (born Lebanon, Kentucky), lives in Franklin Lakes
- T. O'Conor Sloane (1851–1940), scientist, inventor, author, editor, educator, and linguist (born New York City), lived in South Orange
- T. O'Conor Sloane Jr. (1879–1963), photographer (born Brooklyn), lived in South Orange
- Wesley Snipes (born Orlando, Florida), lives in Alpine
- Luis Sojo (born Miranda State, Venezuela), lives in Saddle Brook
- Paul Sorvino (born Brooklyn, New York City), lived in Tenafly
- Pat Summerall (1930–2013), born in Lake City, Florida, lived in Saddle River
- James "J.T." Taylor (born Laurens, South Carolina), lives in Franklin Lakes
- Walt Whitman (born Huntington, New York), lived in Camden
- Mitch Williams (born Santa Ana, California), lives in Medford
- Woodrow Wilson (born Staunton, Virginia), 28th president of the United States, governor of New Jersey, lived in Princeton
- Dave Winfield (born Saint Paul, Minnesota), lives in Teaneck
- Stevie Wonder (born Saginaw, Michigan), lives in Alpine
- Feng Yun (born Liaoning, China), lives in New Jersey
- Shou-Wu Zhang (born Hexian, Anhui, China), lives in Tenafly

== See also ==
- List of colonial governors of New Jersey
- List of governors of New Jersey
- List of New Jersey suffragists
- List of Kean University people
- List of Lawrenceville School alumni
- List of New Brunswick Theological Seminary people
- List of people from Englewood, New Jersey
- List of people from Hoboken, New Jersey
- List of people from Jersey City, New Jersey
- List of justices of the Supreme Court of New Jersey
- List of people from Montclair, New Jersey
- List of people from Newark, New Jersey
- List of people from South Orange, New Jersey
- List of people from Teaneck, New Jersey
- List of people from Union City, New Jersey
- List of Princeton University people
- List of Rutgers University people
- List of Upsala College people
- List of United States representatives from New Jersey
- List of United States senators from New Jersey
- Lists of Americans
- New Jersey Hall of Fame
