= Elon Ganor =

Israeli entrepreneur and artist

Elon A. Ganor
- אילון גנור
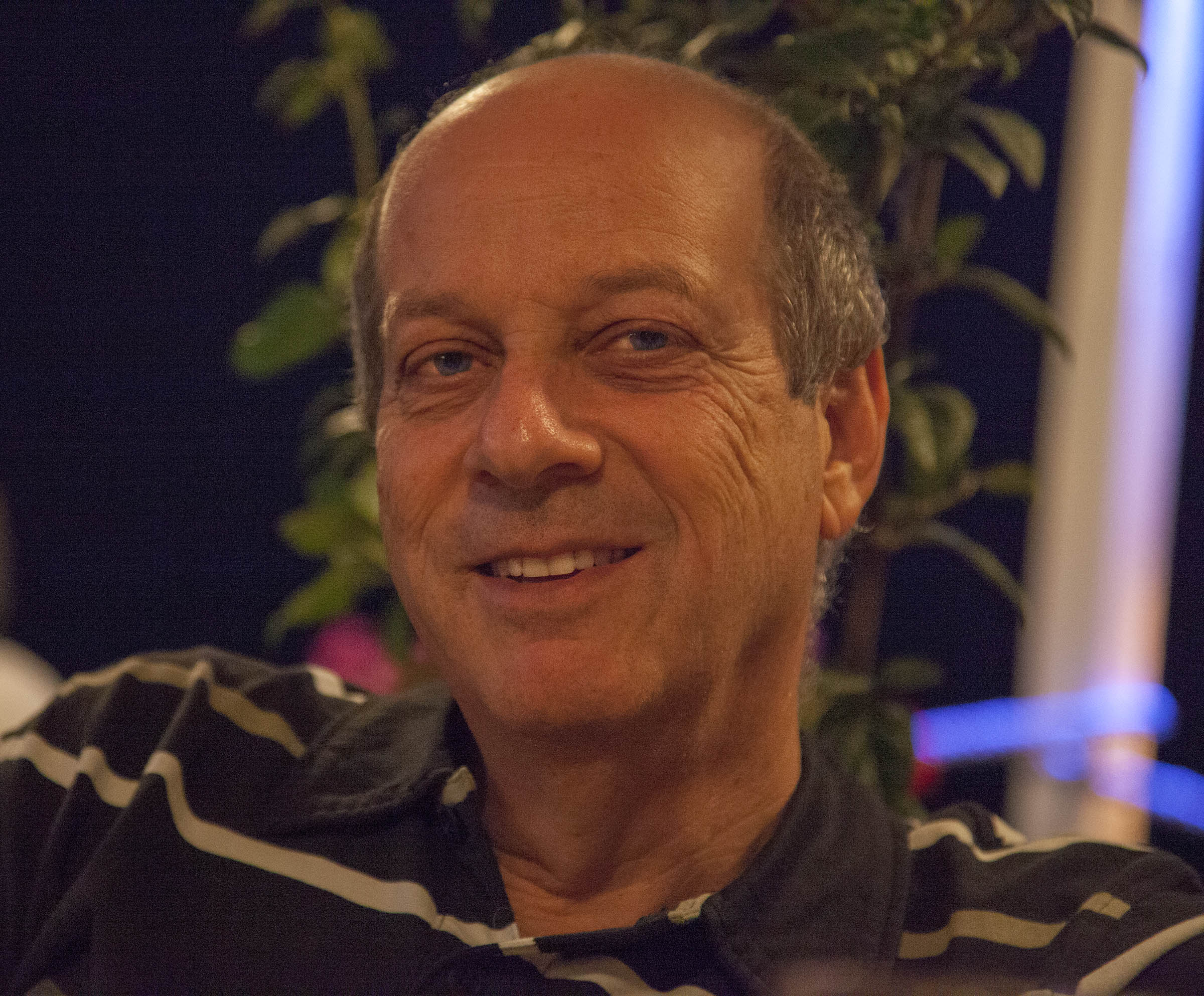
- Born: 1950 (age 75–76); Geneva, Switzerland
- Occupations: Entrepreneur, artist

Elon A. Ganor (Hebrew: אילון גנור; born 1950) is an Israeli entrepreneur known for his role as one of the world's first VoIP pioneers. He was chairman and CEO of VocalTec Ltd (Nasdaq: CALL), the company behind the creation of "Internet Phone", the world's first commercial software product that enabled voice communication over the internet, known initially as "Internet Telephony" and later as VoIP.

== Biography ==
Elon Ganor was born in Geneva, Switzerland. He grew up in Tel Aviv, and graduated from Tel Aviv University Sackler Medical school in 1975.

== Business career ==
After years of practicing medicine Ganor entered the technology industry. His first company was Virovahl SA- a Swiss-based biotechnology company founded in 1987 with a group of Swedish virologists. The company's laboratory was located in Gothenburg, Sweden. Virovahl SA developed the world's first HIV synthetic peptide based on diagnostic test. Under his guidance as President of Virovahl, the test was licensed exclusively to Pharmacia AB from Uppsala, Sweden (later merged with Upjohn).

In 1990 Ganor joined forces with Alon Cohen and Lior Haramaty who had founded VocalTec Ltd five years earlier in Israel. Cohen and Haramaty developed and manufactured a PC sound card (SpeechBoard TM) that was sold for applications such as multimedia presentations, educational software, to the local visually impaired community in Israel with a unique text to speech software enabling blind people to use a computer in Hebrew and English, voice messaging, IVR, etc. as well as other voice related products. Ganor has joined the company as an international sales representative. Later Ganor was appointed as CEO and chairman, and, though objecting at first but convinced by the founder's advise, the company's focus shifted to audio communication software, at first in conjunction with their hardware, and later expanding compatibility to other sound cards.

In 1993 VocalChat was born, software that enabled voice communication from one PC to another on a local and wide area network. The software was based on an invention by Haramaty and Cohen, the Audio Transceiver and developed by a group of developers including Ofer Kahana (later the founder of Kagoor that was sold to Juniper), Elad Sion (in Israel TOP 8200 Intelligence army unit, died young in a car accident), Ofer Shem Tov (a software developer in Israel) and others. The software was presented in Atlanta in May 1993 at the Network InterOp trade show. In 1994, support for Internet Protocol was added and on February 10, 1995, "Internet Phone" was launched with a near full page Wall Street Journal article by WSJ Boston Correspondent Bill Bulkeley, "Hello World! Audible chats On the Internet" was the header.

VocalTec Ltd became a Nasdaq traded company in February 1996, with Ganor as chairman and CEO and Haramaty and Cohen as board members.

In 1997 Ganor worked with Michael Spencer (at the time principal at Booz Allen Hamilton who led the Internet Strategy Group of the Communications, Media and Technology practice) to develop a new type of a VoIP exchange phone company. After meeting Tom Evslin from AT&T (who led at the time WorldNet AT&T ISP initiative), ITXC was founded, with Tom Evslin as its CEO and cofounder. VocalTec under Ganor invested the initial $500,000 and gave a credit of $1 million in VoIP Gateway equipment in exchange for 19.9% of the new company; AT&T followed with an additional investment. ITXC became the world's largest VoIP carrier, reaching a market cap of about $8 billion as a Nasdaq company in 2000 (prior to the 2008 financial crisis).

In 2008 Ganor became the founder, investor and CEO (with Danny Frumkin, PhD and Adam Wasserstrom, PhD as co-founders) of Nucleix. Nucleix Ltd is a Biotechnology epigenetic company involved in the development of bio-markers and technologies for forensic medicine. The company developed a product for the authentication of DNA.

== Art career ==
Ganor left VocalTec in 2006 to study art at Beit Berl College. He graduated in 2008, majoring in photography.

Among his works, "Wall Street" a series of staged photographs shot in New York and Israel expressing criticism of Wall Street practices (first exhibited in 2008 just before the Lehman Brothers collapse). Also among other series, "The Box" (exhibited in 2009 at Volta show in Switzerland) and Earl King (exhibited in October 2010). Ganor's work can be found in many art collections including the Tel Aviv Museum of Art, Shpilman institute Photography collection, the Israel Museum in Jerusalem and private collections.

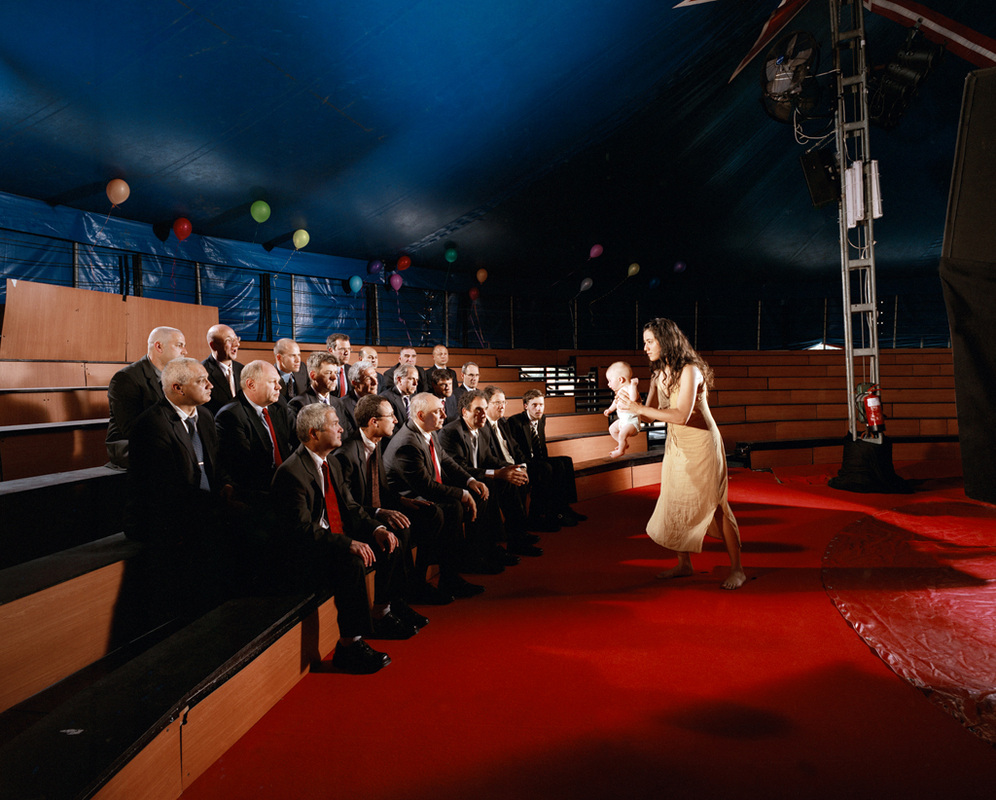
"Road Show", Wall Street series, 2008

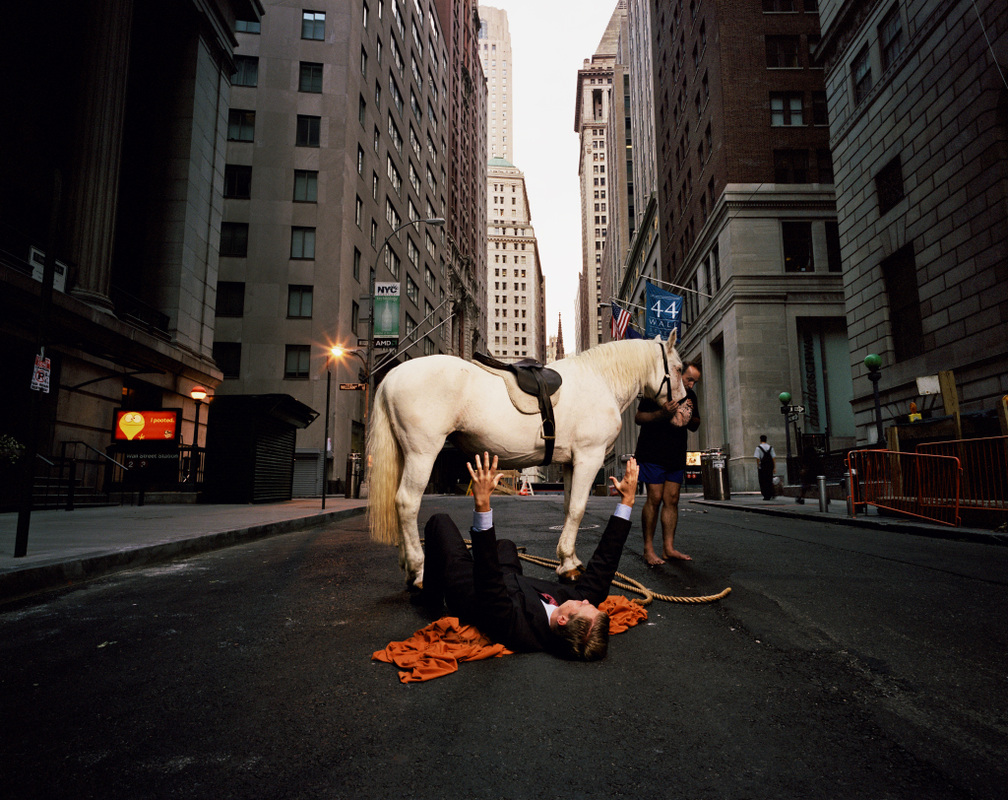
"White Knight", Wall Street series, 2008

== Awards and recognition ==
Ganor has been covered in Der Spiegel, Die Zeit, Wall Street Journal, BusinessWeek, Newsweek, Von Magazine, Computer Business, WebWeek, The Industry Standard, and Time. He has appeared on CNN, and participated as a panelist at the World Economic Forum in Davos, Switzerland. He was also interviewed on the podcast Shaping Business Minds Through Art.

== Public positions ==
- Member of the Board of Governors, Ben-Gurion University of the Negev, Beer Sheba, Israel.
- Member of the Board of Governors and lecturer, Tel Aviv-Yafo Academic college.
