= List of VoIP companies =

This is a list of notable companies providing Voice over Internet Protocol (VoIP) services.

Company	Base of operations	Country	Services provided
Aastra Technologies	Concord, Ontario	Canada	The manufacture of products and systems for accessing communication networks
Access Communications	Regina, Saskatchewan	Canada	Cable television services
AstraQom	Ottawa, Ontario	Canada	VoIP services and integrated communication solutions
AudioCodes	Airport City	Israel	Networking products and applications to service providers and enterprises
Avid Telecom	Arizona	United States	Interconnection services
AVM	Berlin	Germany	DSL, ISDN, Wireless, and VoIP products for communications devices
BigAir	Sydney	Australia	DSL services and Australia's National Broadband Network
CallFire	Santa Monica	United States	Web-based VoIP
Cisco	San Jose, CA	United States	Networking, Hardware phones, Software such as Webex, and Jabber, and systems such as CallManager/Unified Communications Manager
Fastweb	Milan	Italy	Landline, broadband Internet, and digital television services
Google	California	United States	instant messaging, video chat, SMS, and VoIP features through Google Hangouts and Google Voice
Internode	Adelaide	Australia	ADSL broadband, Internet access, web hosting, VoIP, and related services
Mind CTI	Yokneam	Israel	Billing and customer care solutions
Mobivox	Montreal	Canada	International calling service using VoIP and IVR
Nextiva	Scottsdale, Arizona	United States	Cloud-based Communications, VoIP and IVR
Nfon	Munich	Germany	Cloud-based telephone systems
Ooma	Palo Alto, California	United States	VoIP communications for small businesses, home and mobile
Radvision	New Jersey	United States	Video conferencing and telepresence technologies
RingCentral	Belmont, CA and London	United States and UK	Cloud-based telephone systems
Sipgate	Düsseldorf	Germany	VoIP and mobile phone services
sipservice	Winterthur	Switzerland	VoIP service provider
Skype	Palo Alto, CA	United States	Manufacturing and marketing of the video chat and instant messaging computer software program Skype and various Internet telephony services associated with it
TELES AG	Berlin	Germany	VoIP services
Telnyx	Austin, Texas	United States	VoIP and cloud computing
VirtualPBX	San Jose, CA	United States	Cloud-based telephone systems
VocalTec	West Palm Beach and Netanya	United States and Israel	Telecom equipment provider
VoiceHost	London	United Kingdom	VoIP and DSL provider
Voipfone	London	United Kingdom	Cloud based Internet Telephony Provider
Vonage	New Jersey	United States, Australia, UK, Canada	Commercial telecommunication services
