= Internet Telephony Services Providers' Association =

The Internet Telephony Service Providers Association (ITSPA) is a British body representing providers of Internet Telephony services (VoIP).

== History ==
Officially launched in December 2004, its existing founder members are Gradwell Dotcom Ltd, Magrathea Telecommunications Limited, Telappliant, Timico Ltd, Voicenet Solutions Ltd, Voipfone and XConnect and corporate members such as BT and Gamma. ITSPA aims to promote competition and self-regulation in order to encourage the development of a flourishing and innovative VoIP industry.

== Activities ==
As a trade association, membership is voluntary but the companies who choose to become members agree to abide by the ITSPA code of practice.

ITSPA's main activity is in making representations on behalf of the industry to Government bodies, such as the Home Office, the Department for Business, Enterprise and Regulatory Reform (former DTI) and Ofcom.

== Quality Mark ==
The enhanced version of the Quality Mark was introduced in 2016

Members of ITSPA can apply for the Quality Mark, which ensures that consumers are guaranteed that the certified organisation complies with the following points

1. Adherence to the ITSPA Code of Practice and Best Practice Guidance documents
2. Evidence that their platform design is resilient and that they deliver a reliable service, which will be measured by ITSPA as 99.99% availability between 8am & 8pm Monday-Friday, using the VoIP Spear monitoring platform.
3. Transparent porting arrangements.
4. Active fraud control measures.
5. Evidence of access to the emergency services.
6. Easy to find information on complaints & dispute resolution.
7. Policies in place for Nuisance Calls & CLI Presentation.
8. Evidence of Data Protection & Retention Compliance.
9. Evidence of their Single Point of Contact showing that there is an easy way to contact the member with issues arising.

The first VoIP providers to gain the enhanced Quality Mark were:

- Voipfone
- Hello Telecom
- SureVoIP
- VoiceHost
- Gradwell

== Regulation ==
Policies are agreed by the ITSPA Council (on advice from the Industry Developments Working Group), a body of up to ten people selected from and representing the various interests of the membership. The Council is served by a secretariat.

== ITSPA Awards ==
Now into its 5th year, the 2013 ITSPA Awards were held on Wednesday 6 March 2013. There are now eight award categories which provide the opportunity for all companies involved in IP telephony (whether it be a service provider, wholesaler or vendor) to participate.

2013 Award Winners

1. Best Consumer VoIP - Localphone
2. Best Business ITSP (Small Enterprise) - Voipfone
3. Best Business ITSP (Medium Enterprise) - Telappliant
4. Best Business ITSP (Corporate) - Ciptex
5. Best VoIP CPE - Sangoma Technologies – NetBorder Lync Express
6. Best VoIP Infrastructure - Metaswitch Networks – Perimeta 3.3
7. Most Innovative VoIP Product - Voxhub – Voxtop Apps Platform
8. ITSPA Members' Pick - Mark Spencer (computer engineer) for developing Asterisk (PBX)

Highly Commended

1. Best Consumer VoIP: BT Group
2. Best Business ITSP (Small Enterprise): VoiceHost
3. Best Business ITSP (Medium Enterprise): Voxhub
4. Best Business ITSP (Corporate): Timico
5. Best VoIP CPE: Grandstream Networks – GXP2200 Enterprise Application Phone for Android™
6. Best VoIP Infrastructure: Genband – GENBAND Web Application Manager (WAM)
7. Most Innovative VoIP Product/Service: Alcatel-Lucent – OpenTouch Conversation

== See also ==
- Internet Service Providers Association
