= Ymax =

Ymax may refer to:

- WiMax, a wireless telecommunications protocol
- YMAX, the parent company of magicJack, LP, which sells a voice over IP device
