= Tdsoft =

Tdsoft is an Israeli company, founded in 1994 by Yosi Albagli, Arie Shaham and Eytan Radian, together with Teledata Communications. Tdsoft developed V5.X based products, including V5Core Software, V5Proxi, and Tdgate family of TDM / ATM and Voice over IP access gateways.

Investors in Tdsoft included Apax, Gemini, HarbourVest Partners and Cisco Systems.

In 2001, Tdsoft acquired the Hunt 8110 product line from Cisco. In 2004, Tdsoft acquired the assets of Be-Connected from Telrad, and expanded its offering of access gateways.

In November 2005, Tdsoft took control over VocalTec (NASDAQ:VOCL), in a way of a reverse merger, and continued the combined business, by providing Voice over IP solutions to Telecommunications service providers, under the public entity and brand name of VocalTec.

== See also ==
- List of VoIP companies
