= VoiceHost =

Internet telephone service in UK

- Type: Private
- Industry: Cloud communications
- Founded: June 20, 2006; 20 years ago in Norwich, England
- Founder: Ross Beer
- Headquarters: Norwich
- Services: Hosted PBX, SIP Trunking
- Website: voicehost.co.uk

VoiceHost Limited is a UK (Norwich) based Internet Telephone Service (VoIP) which was founded in 2006.

The company develops standards-based VoIP telephony services using Session Initiation Protocol (SIP) and is a Quality Mark approved member of the Internet Telephony Services Providers’ Association (ITSPA).

== Tesco controversy and notoriety ==
The collapse of the Tesco Internet Phone service in 2010 (powered by FreshTel) Ofcom re-allocated the telephone number blocks to VoiceHost to enable services to continue for consumers.

== Norwich Telecommunications Technology Cluster ==
Based at Norfolk Tower the company is part of the technology cluster recognized nationally by Tech City UK as a telecommunications cluster.

The company is the only Local Internet Registry (LIR) within Norwich and a member of RIPE Network Coordination Centre and appeared on the Deloitte Technology Fast-Track 50 and 500 lists' 2015.

== See also ==
- List of VOIP companies
- Norfolk Tower
