= VocalTec =

Israeli telecom equipment provider

VocalTec Communications
- Type: Public
- Traded as: Nasdaq: CALL
- Industry: Telecommunications
- Founded: 1985; 41 years ago
- Founder: Alon Cohen; Lior Haramaty
- Headquarters: West Palm Beach, Florida, Netanya, Israel
- Key people: Daniel Borislow (CEO)
- Products: VoIP
- Revenue: ▲US$ 158.36 million (2012)
- Operating income: ▲US$ 43.56 million (2012)
- Net income: ▲US$ 55.85 million (2012)
- Total assets: ▲US$ 194.23 million (2012)
- Total equity: ▲US$ 49.09 million (2012)
- Subsidiaries: magicJack
- Website: vocaltec.com

VocalTec Communications Inc. is an Israeli telecom equipment provider. The company was founded in 1985 by Alon Cohen and Lior Haramaty, who patented the first Voice over IP audio transceiver. VocalTec has supplied major customers such as Deutsche Telekom, Telecom Italia, and many others.

== History ==
VocalTec was founded in 1985 by Alon Cohen and Lior Haramaty while still serving together in the IDF, and was officially incorporated in 1989. Its initial operations were devoted to research, development and commercialization of products which provided audio and voice capabilities to personal computers and over computer networks. Cohen and Haramaty developed and manufactured a PC sound card (SpeechBoard TM) that was sold mainly to the local market for various uses such as educational, advertising, radio broadcasting and to the visually-impaired community in Israel with a unique Text to Speech software enabling blind people to use a computer in Hebrew as well as English. As Text to Speech was not available in Hebrew at all, and rarely available in English, they developed both from scratch, utilizing Haramaty's voice, and a user-update-able dictionary of words that was periodically merged between all users.

Other projects during the mid to late 80s included Audio editing software, external audio card (mainly for laptops) that was connected the parallel (printer) port, standalone digital audio playback device for frozen dessert trucks, multimedia presentation with audio (based on IBM's Story Board presentation software), a system for the disabled (mute) with text to speech which enabled "talking" and conducting phone calls, broadcasting recording, editing and transfer system for offshore radio station, automated IVR information systems, voice messaging over LAN and many other projects utilizing digital audio.

In 1990, technology entrepreneur Elon Ganor joined the company to manage International Sales & Marketing, and later on was nominated as CEO.

In 1993, VocalTec introduced The CAT to the international market, a peripheral device that provided audio capability for personal computers. In 1993 and 1994, the company introduced additional products, including CATBoard, a full duplex audio card, an internal audio card that provided high level compression. Net sales of these products totaled approximately $0.3 million, $0.4 Million and $0.2 Million in 1993, 1994 and the first nine months of 1995, respectively, and the Company did not expect to recognize significant revenues from sales of these products in the future.

In early 1993 the company partnered with ClassX, a group of innovative teenagers led by Ofer Shem-Tov (a childhood friend of Haramaty) to develop MS Windows audio drivers and related software. ClassX was acquired by VocalTec in 1993 and became the core of VocalTec's software and network development team, and the company recruited Rami Amit as a hardware engineer (also a childhood friend of Haramaty and Shem-Tov).

Despite Ganor's initial objection, VocalTec's management decided to shift the company's focus to software, and in 1993 VocalChat was born, a software that enabled voice communication from one PC to another on a local and wide area network, and VocalChat LAN/WAN, hardware and software products that enable real-time voice conversations over local and wide area computer networks. The software was developed, based on Cohen & Haramaty's Audio Transceiver design, by a group of developers including Ofer Shem Tov, Ofer Kahana, Elad Sion (died young in a car accident), Dror Tirosh, Rami Amit and others. The software was presented in Atlanta in May 1993 at the Network InterOp trade show. In 1994 support for Internet Protocol was added and on Friday, February 10, 1995 “Internet Phone“ was launched with a near full page Wall Street Journal article by WSJ Boston Correspondent Bill Bulkeley, “Hello World! Audible chats On the Internet” was the header.

=== VocalTec Internet Phone ===
VocalTec released the first ever Internet VoIP application in February 1995. The product was named Internet Phone but according to Wired magazine many people simply called it iPhone; and was the world's first VoIP software.

The software was invented by Alon Cohen and Lior Haramaty, the two co-founders of VocalTec Ltd. At the base of the Internet Phone was the invention of Alon Cohen and Lior Haramaty named the "Audio Transceiver", which managed the dynamic jitter buffer that was critical for achieving adaptive lower possible audio latency along with handling packet loss, packet re-ordering, and receiver transmitter sample rate adjustments. The first implementation of the "Audio Transceiver" was carried out by Elad Sion.

=== Initial Public Offering ===
VocalTec had an initial public offering on the NASDAQ on February 6, 1996. The company sold 2,500,000 shares for $19 a share. 1,750,00 shares were sold by the company and 750,000 were sold by selling shareholders including Elon Ganor, VocalTec's CEO and his brother in law, Ami Tal, through their holding of La Cresta International Trading Inc. VocalTec's leadership who managed its successful IPO included: Elon Ganor - chairman of the board and CEO, Alon Cohen - Co-founder, Director and Chief Technology Officer, Lior Haramaty - Co-founder, Director and Vice President Technical Marketing, Yahal Zilka - Chief Financial officer and Secretary, Daniel Nissan - Vice President Marketing, Ohad Finkelstein - Vice President International Sales, Ami Tal - Director and Chief Operating Officer.

In 1997, Deltathree, an American company engaged in the business of voice over IP telephony services, launched an Internet-based international low cost calling service using VocalTec's VoIP technology, and VocalTec Internet Phone "PC to Phone" system. The same year, Europe's largest telecommunications company, Deutsche Telekom, bought a 21.1 percent stake in VocalTec for $48.3 million, in addition to purchasing $30 million in telephony products, services, and support over the following two-and-a-half years. During the Dot-com bubble the company's share peaked at a price of $3,363 per share on March 3, 2000 (split adjusted).

In 2005, the company completed a business combination with Tdsoft, a provider of VoIP Gateways. and refocused on providing carrier-class multimedia and voice-over-IP systems for communication service providers. The company's Essentra suite, comprised the essential building blocks required to develop a next-generation-network, addressing customers’ specific requirements in trunking, peering and residential/enterprise VoIP applications.

=== Reverse merger with magicJack ===
On July 16, 2010, MagicJack took over VocalTec in a reverse takeover.

== ITXC ==
In 1997, VocalTec founded ITXC Corporation a US-based wholesale provider of Internet-based phone calls. The ITXC voice-over-IP network was powered by the VocalTec technology. The company was founded after Vocaltec's CEO at the time, Elon Ganor met Tom Evslin from AT&T (who led at the time WorldNet AT&T ISP initiative) in a conference, ITXC was founded, with Tom Evslin as its CEO and cofounder. VocalTec invested an initial $500K ITXC Corporation and gave a credit of $1Million in VoIP Gateway equipment in exchange of 19.9% of the company, AT&T followed with an additional investment. ITXC became the world's largest VoIP Carrier reaching a market cap of about $8 Billion as a Nasdaq company in 2000 (prior to the March 2000 Dot com crash).

In 2003 ITXC was acquired by Teleglobe.

== See also ==
- List of VoIP companies
- Silicon Wadi
- Voice over IP
