= AstraQom =

Telecommunications holding company

AstraQom International
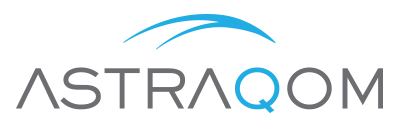
- Type: Privately held company
- Industry: Telecommunications
- Founded: 2008
- Headquarters: Ottawa (Canada); San Jose (US)
- Number of locations: 24
- Area served: Americas, Asia-Pacific, Europe, Middle East & Africa
- Key people: Jonathan Sowah, CEO
- Products: Hosted PBX; Virtual Numbers; Virtual Office; SIP Trunking
- Number of employees: 813
- Subsidiaries: AstraQom Algeria; AstraQom Andorra; AstraQom Angola; AstraQom Anguilla; AstraQom Argentina; AstraQom Armenia; AstraQom Australia; AstraQom Austria; AstraQom Bahrain; AstraQom Belarus; AstraQom Belgium; AstraQom Benin; AstraQom Botswana; AstraQom Brazil; AstraQom Bulgaria; AstraQom Canada; AstraQom Chile; AstraQom China; AstraQom Colombia; AstraQom Congo; AstraQom Costa Rica; AstraQom Cote D'ivoire; AstraQom Croatia; AstraQom Cyprus; AstraQom Czech Republic; AstraQom Denmark; AstraQom Dominican Republic; AstraQom Egypt; AstraQom El Salvador; AstraQom Estonia; AstraQom Fiji; AstraQom Finland; AstraQom France; AstraQom Georgia; AstraQom Germany; AstraQom Ghana; AstraQom Greece; AstraQom Guatemala; AstraQom Honduras; AstraQom Hong Kong; AstraQom Hungary; AstraQom Iceland; AstraQom India; AstraQom Indonesia; AstraQom Iran; AstraQom Iraq; AstraQom Ireland; AstraQom Israel; AstraQom Italy; AstraQom Jamaica; AstraQom Japan; AstraQom Kazakhstan; AstraQom Kenya; AstraQom Kuwait; AstraQom Latvia; AstraQom Liberia; AstraQom Lithuania; AstraQom Luxembourg; AstraQom Malaysia; AstraQom Malta; AstraQom Mexico; AstraQom Morocco; AstraQom Netherlands; AstraQom New Caledonia; AstraQom New Zealand; AstraQom Nicaragua; AstraQom Nigeria; AstraQom Norway; AstraQom Panama; AstraQom Papua New Guinea; AstraQom Peru; AstraQom Philippines; AstraQom Poland; AstraQom Portugal; AstraQom Puerto Rico; AstraQom Reunion Island; AstraQom Romania; AstraQom Russia; AstraQom Saudi Arabaia; AstraQom Seychelles Island; AstraQom Singapore; AstraQom Slovakia; AstraQom Slovenia; AstraQom South Africa; AstraQom South Korea; AstraQom Spain; AstraQom Sweden; AstraQom Switzerland; AstraQom Tajikistan; AstraQom Thailand; AstraQom Tonga; AstraQom Turkey; AstraQom Turks and Caicos Islands; AstraQom Uganda; AstraQom Ukraine; AstraQom United Kingdom; AstraQom USA; AstraQom USVI; AstraQom Venezuela; AstraQom Vietnam; SIP Trunking
- Website: AstraQom's Official Web Page

AstraQom International is a multi-national holding company that serves the telecommunications sector. The company is a provider of VoIP services and integrated communication solutions.

AstraQom currently provides VoIP services in more than 100 countries, covering 4 major regions: the Americas, Asia-Pacific, and the Europe, Middle East and Africa Region.

== Background ==
AstraQom was founded in 2008 as AstraQom Corporation. In 2009, AstraQom Corp amalgamated with Aon Communications (Canada) Inc., a network development provider based in Ottawa.

In August 2011, the company moved its headquarters to Ottawa, Ontario to consolidate its Canadian offices and establish a headquarters. In early 2012, the first subsidiary was created as a Canadian VoIP business provider – AstraQom Canada Corporation – a Federal Canadian corporation with main offices in Ottawa, Ontario. That same year, AstraQom's Immersion in Promoting Industry Peers won the 2011 Kamailio (OpenSER) Award.

In April 2012, AstraQom expanded their Hosted PBX client services with the addition of a Virtual Receptionist service. A virtual receptionist service provides a live answering option to small businesses that cannot afford, or do not need, a full-time receptionist. The service uses a toll-free number that is answered by agents who act as receptionists for various companies.

AstraQom Canada, AstraQom International's subsidiary, expanded in December 2013 by acquiring Shi Lian Telecom, a business telephone service provider targeting Chinese-owned businesses in Canada and the United States.

In May 2014, AstraQom moved its global headquarters to Silicon Valley and opened an office in San Jose, California.

Early in 2015, AstraQom Canada moved its headquarters to the Greater Toronto Area (GTA), opening its second Canadian office and 6th international office. The company's Ottawa office now serves as its main network hub. It also started supporting immigrant entrepreneurs, small businesses and diversity initiatives.

Global expansion of AstraQom has included the opening of offices in the United States, the United Kingdom, Australia and New Zealand in 2015, followed by the Philippines and Brazil, in 2016, followed by a move of the company's headquarters to Campbell California.

== Services ==
AstraQom provides a variety of telecom-related services including: Hosted PBX, E-Fax (incoming faxes at no charge), Virtual telephone numbers (over 100 countries covered), Virtual office, A-Z Termination, Vanity Numbers, SIP Trunking.

Its Computer telephony integrations products include CRM, Hotel and Call Center software integrated with AstraQom's Hosted PBX.

== Coverage ==
AstraQom offers Voice over IP and a range of integrated solutions to the following regions and countries:

AstraQom Americas		
Argentina	Brazil	Canada
Chile	El Salvador	Mexico
Panama	Peru	Puerto Rico
USA	Venezuela	Colombia
Costa Rica	Jamaica	USVI
Puerto Rico		

AstraQom Asia-Pacific		
Australia	New Zealand	Singapore
Philippines	Japan	Malaysia
China	Hong Kong	India
Indonesia	Kazakhstan	China
Tonga	Vietnam	Thailand
New Caledonia	South Korea	

AstraQom Europe, Middle East and Africa		
Austria	Belgium	Bulgaria
Cyprus	Denmark	Estonia
Finland	France	Kenya
Germany	Greece	Ireland
Israel	Italy	Latvia
Lithuania	Luxembourg	Malta
Norway	Portugal	Romania
Slovakia	Slovenia	Spain
Sweden	Switzerland	South Africa
UK		

== Projects and partnerships ==
In June 2012, AstraQom partnered with Bios Technologies, a provider of computer and network hardware and services serving the West Quebec and Ottawa areas. Bios became the provider of IP communications solutions to federal and provincial public functions, hospitals and businesses, as a re-seller for AstraQom products and services. Following this, AstraQom expanded its Channel Partner program and currently has hundreds of resellers around the world.

== See also ==
- List of VOIP companies
