= Servify =

Device management platform

- Type: Private company
- Founded: 2015
- Founder: Sreevathsa Prabhakar
- Headquarters: Mumbai, India
- Area served: North America, Middle East, China, Europe, Turkey, India
- Key people: Pragyan Mohanty (Group COO)
- Revenue: ▼₹751 crore (US$78 million) (2026)
- Net income: ▲₹−51 crore (US$−5.3 million) (2026)
- Number of employees: 700+ (2022)
- Parent: Service Lee Technologies Private Limited
- Website: Official website

Servify is a device management platform, founded in 2015. It is headquartered in Mumbai, India and operates in North America, Europe, Middle East, China and Turkey. It provides services such as product diagnosis, queue management, warranty and protection plans to its clients. In 2019, Servify was featured in Red Herring Asia Top 100 Technology company list.

== History ==
Servify was founded by Sreevathsa Prabhakar in 2015. Before starting Servify, Prabhakar was running a company called The Service Solutions, which he had started in 2009 and later it was acquired by B2X GmbH, a Germany based customer service outsourcing company.

It received its first round of funding in April 2016 for an undisclosed amount from Blume Ventures, Beenext, Barkawi Holdings and TM Service Technology Holdings.

In June 2016, OnePlus used Servify's technology to launch the 'OnePlus Care' app that allows customers to self-diagnose their smartphones and avail doorstep pickup for service center, if needed repair. The company is also partnered with brands like Apple, Oppo, Panasonic, Realme, Nokia, OnePlus, Xiaomi, Amazon, AmTrust, Croma, Godrej, Huawei, Ingram Micro, Micromax, Motorola, Lenovo, Reliance Jio, Reliance Retail and Vodafone.

Servify raised $15M in its Series B funding round from Iron Pillar, Blume Ventures and Beenext in August 2018. It acquired a gadgets repair startup iService in January 2019.

In June 2020, Samsung tied up with Servify to launch Samsung Care+ that provides protection service for Samsung Galaxy smartphones. It secured Rs. 85.8 crores in its Series C funding round for its existing investors, Iron Pillar and Blume Ventures.

Servify raised $23M in Series C funding round from Iron Pillar, Blume Ventures, Beenext and Tetrao SPF in September 2020. Servify acquired key businesses of German-based WebToGo.

Servify acquires 247Around to strengthen its service fulfilment network beyond smart products.

Servify raises $65 million as part of its ongoing Series D funding round.

In a cash and equity deal, Servify acquired Jubi.ai, a Mumbai-based conversational bot platform used for customer support and sales automation.

Servify Partners with Thumb Cellular for Device Protection.

Servify expands its reach, partnering with Eureka Forbes, Panasonic, Harman & TCL to power their extended warranty programs in India.

== Recognition ==
- Red Herring Asia Top 100 Winner 2019
- Outlook Business's Power of I 2019 list
- DIA Top 100 Insuretechs 2019
- Businessworld Techtors 2020
- Winner Best Enterprise Product/Service in India Digital Enabler Awards 2020
- Nasscom Emerge50 Awards 2021
- 2022 Red Herring Top 100 Global: Winner
- 2022 Deloitte Technology Fast 50 India Winner
- 2022 ASK Private Wealth and Hurun India Future Unicorn Index
- 2023 Tracxn Emerging Startup Awards of 2023
- 2023 Hurun Star of Mumbai
- 2023 ET Great Managers Award of 2023
- 2024 Tracxn Emerging Startup Awards of 2024
- 2024 B2B Startup of the Year Award
- 2024 Winner of Deloitte's Technology Fast 50

== See also ==
- Asurion
- Assurant
