= Call-through telecom =

== Technology ==
Call-through telecom providers use Voice over IP (VoIP) call termination to connect the caller to the recipient. Most of the call is carried over IP network, where cost of carrying of the audio signal is cheaper than traditional phone carriers. The calls that are initiated on the Internet (e.g. Skype) use VoIP. These calls can terminate at other point on Internet or even at the point, which is not on the Internet, e.g. traditional telephone line - this is known as call termination.
