= Freshtel =

Australian telephony company

Freshtel Holdings Limited
- Type: Public (ASX: FRE)
- Industry: Telecommunications
- Founded: January 2004
- Headquarters: Melbourne, Victoria
- Key people: Rhonda O'Donnell, CEO; Kenneth V Loughnan, Chairman
- Products: Voice over Internet Protocol service, software and hardware
- Number of employees: 30 (2009)
- Website: freshtel.net

Freshtel Holdings Limited is an Australian telephony company developing and marketing Voice over IP products and services. Freshtel Holdings Limited offers VoIP solutions to wholesale customers globally through its wholly owned subsidiaries, Voicedot and Virbiage, and has a direct-to-market retail channel through Freshtel Pty Ltd.

In December 2005 Freshtel signed an agreement with Tesco to provide a white label Internet telephony solution for the UK market. In late December 2005 Tesco acquired a 6% stake in Freshtel, increased to 12% in November 2006.

Due to significant losses on its UK activity (including transfer costs), which contributed over 70% of revenue, Freshtel announced in February 2010 that an agreement had been reached with Tesco to terminate the VoIP services it had provided. In May 2010 Freshtel announced that it had sold its UK operation for $150,000.

== Structure ==
The Freshtel Holdings business is structured into three separate channels and an internal research and development arm. Each channel has its own brand and performs a different business function.

Virbiage is a manufacturer and distributor of VoIP hardware such as Internet telephones and analogue telephone adaptors. Virbiage retails these products through its own web site and through distribution agreements with international partners.

Voicedot Networks (formerly VoiceStream Networks) runs the Internet telephone network used to route data for Freshtel's customers. Voicedot provides a wholesale version of the Freshtel Australia retail offering.

Both of these companies supply services to Freshtel Pty Ltd, the retail provider of these services.

Freshtel R&D undertakes all of Freshtel's product research and development. Freshtel R&D is currently part of the Australian Government R&D initiative.
