= Voipfone =

British telecommunications company

iNet Telecoms Ltd
- Trade name: Voipfone
- Company type: Limited liability company
- Industry: Telecommunications
- Founded: July 1, 2004; 21 years ago in East Sussex, England
- Founder: Lee Rose (CTO)
- Headquarters: London, United Kingdom
- Key people: Lee Rose (CTO); Colin Duffy (CEO)
- Products: PBX, IPBX, PSTN, broadband, telephone switchboard
- Services: Cloud-based hosted telephone services for business
- Number of employees: 40+ (September 2015)
- Website: voipfone.co.uk

iNet Telecoms Ltd, trading as Voipfone, is a British telecommunications company founded in 2004 by Lee Rose. It develops VoIP telephony services using session initiation protocol. In 2013, it won the Queen's Award for Enterprise in the innovation category. As of July 2024, it had an annual turnover of over £6 million.

== See also ==
- List of VoIP companies
