= MagicJack =

VoIP product, Telecom company

magicJack

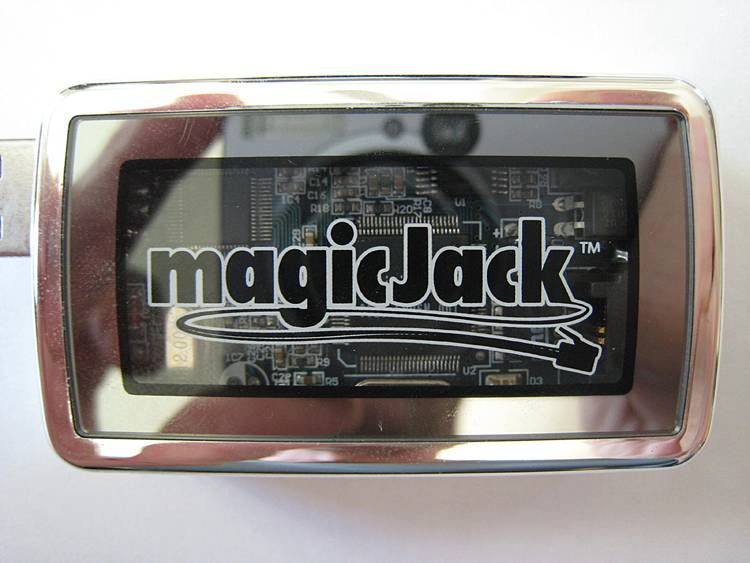
- First Generation magicJack device
- Founded: 2007; 19 years ago
- Founders: Dan Borislow and Donald Burns
- Website: Official website

MagicJack, stylized as magicJack, is a service that allows people in the United States and Canada to make phone calls over the Internet. This type of phone service is called Internet-based telephone service (VoIP).

Originally, MagicJack required a computer to work. Users connected a small device to their computer, and with an internet connection, they could make calls. In 2011, MagicJack introduced a new model called MagicJack Plus that does not need a computer, though users still need an Internet connection.

The MagicJack device works with a specific phone service provider, YMAX Corporation, which also offers local phone services. Voicemail is saved on MagicJack's servers and can be accessed directly by phone or received via email with audio files. Users can also download updates for the MagicJack device from third-party software providers.

== History ==
Dan Borislow invented MagicJack in 2007 and, along with Donald Burns, invested $25 million to start the company. Borislow applied for patents with the U.S. government for the product.

The first MagicJack product, released in 2007, was a USB device that allowed users to make phone calls over the Internet. It included both the necessary software and hardware to connect traditional landline telephones to a high-speed Internet connection.

In September 2011, MagicJack introduced a new model called MagicJack Plus. This version eliminated the need for a computer after the initial setup, connecting directly to a modem or router via an Ethernet port. It also featured a standard phone jack and an AC power adapter for easy connection.

The company promotes its products through TV infomercials and its website, where Dan Borislow is credited with inventing MagicJack and founding YMAX. Borislow holds several pending patents related to VoIP technology.

In July 2010, YMAX, the creator of MagicJack, merged with VocalTec to form MagicJack VocalTec Ltd, which is based in Netanya, Israel, and is listed on Nasdaq under the ticker symbol CALL.

== Reviews ==
In January 2008, PC Magazine reviewed MagicJack and rated it as "Very Good," awarding it their Editors' Choice accolade. However, after receiving numerous complaints about the device's customer support, PC Magazine reassessed MagicJack in February 2009 and downgraded its rating to "Good," criticizing the company's technical support as "severely lacking." MagicJack provides support primarily through web-based chat.

Consumer Reports gave MagicJack a positive review in 2010.

In 2016, TheVoIPHub published a detailed review of MagicJack, covering every device the company had released up to that point. That same year, CNET described MagicJack as a "trade-off between price and reliability."

By 2019, MagicJack's ratings had declined significantly. Voip Review rated it 1.6 stars, down from 3 stars in 2014. Additionally, as of November 2019, Consumer Affairs rated MagicJack at just 1 star.

== Features ==
In September 2011, MagicJack introduced local number portability, allowing customers to keep their existing phone numbers when switching to its service. To maintain a "ported-in" number, there is an annual fee. Additionally, if customers wish to transfer their number from MagicJack to another service provider, the company charges a fee for this transfer. However, not all area codes in the U.S. are available for this service. A separate prepaid minutes purchase is required for calls to conference lines, platforms, calling cards, certain non-ILEC area calls, area code 867 (Northern Canada), and most of Alaska.

Initially, MagicJack lacked a formal uninstallation method in both its software and documentation, which led to frustration among users. In response to these issues, the company introduced an uninstaller for the Windows version of MagicJack starting in 2010. This uninstaller can now be accessed through the "Add/Remove Programs" option in the Windows Control Panel.

== Lawsuits ==
In March 2009, MagicJack sued Boing Boing for defamation over the blog's criticism of MagicJack's terms of service. The blog had claimed that the terms allowed MagicJack to monitor user calls for targeted advertising and required users to forfeit their right to sue in court. The lawsuit was dismissed as a strategic lawsuit against public participation (SLAPP), and MagicJack was ordered to pay Boing Boing's legal fees of $50,000.

In April 2012, MagicJack filed a patent infringement lawsuit against netTalk. However, the federal court dismissed the case with prejudice, including all claims and counterclaims.

On September 21, 2012, netTalk sued MagicJack VocalTec, MagicJack Holdings (formerly YMAX Holdings), and Daniel Borislow in the Southern District of Florida, alleging patent infringement. NetTalk sought $200 million in damages. MagicJack requested a reexamination of netTalk's patent, which was granted, and the lawsuit was paused. In December 2013, the Patent Office indicated it would issue a reexamination certificate for netTalk's patent. NetTalk then sought to restart the lawsuit in January 2014, but MagicJack announced the dismissal of the case on February 4, 2014.

On February 27, 2014, netTalk received the reexamination certificate, affirming the validity of its patent claims with minor amendments.

On April 2, 2014, Daniel Borislow and Technochat sued MagicJack VocalTec and YMAX for defamation and fraudulent inducement. The case was settled out of court in December 2014 following Borislow's death.

On August 31, 2017, Finkelstein & Krinsk, LLP filed a class action lawsuit against MagicJack, claiming that MagicJack shareholders were deprived of fair proxy materials and voting rights related to the company's April 19, 2017 and July 31, 2017 proxy solicitations.

On July 12, 2018, Ramon Martinez and Moses Lopez sued MagicJack over allegations of robocalls made using a predictive dialer without human intervention.

On July 25, 2018, Galilee Acquisition filed a lawsuit against MagicJack, alleging that the company provided misleading information about the fair market value of Broadsmart telecommunications. The court dismissed the lawsuit, finding that the claims were derivative and that the plaintiff had not made a proper demand on MagicJack or demonstrated that such a demand would be futile.
