= 1980 United States Senate election in Vermont =

- November 4, 1980
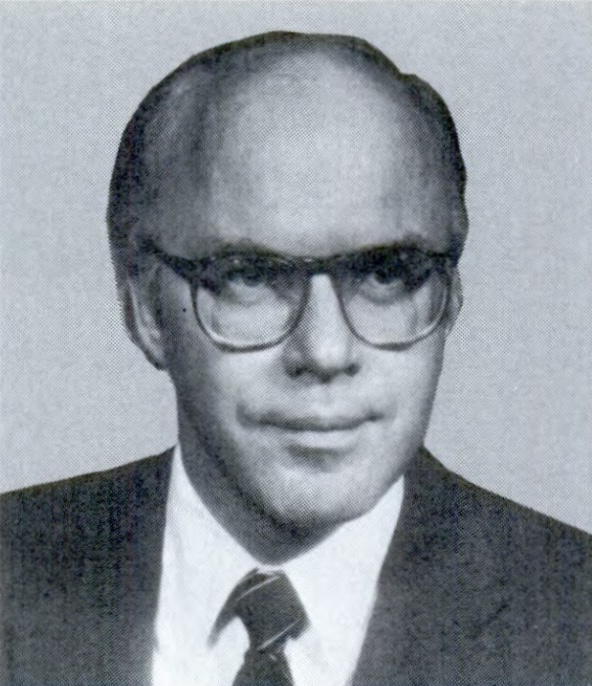

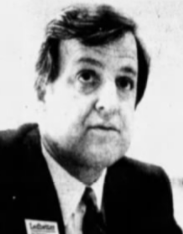
Nominee	Patrick Leahy	Stewart Ledbetter
Party	Democratic	Republican
Popular vote	104,089	101,647
Percentage	49.76%	48.59%
- Leahy: 40–50% 50–60% 60–70% 70–80% Ledbetter: 40–50% 50–60% 60–70% 70–80% 80–90%
U.S. senator before election
Patrick Leahy
Democratic
Elected U.S. Senator
Patrick Leahy
Democratic

The 1980 United States Senate election in Vermont took place on November 4, 1980. Incumbent Democratic U.S. Senator Patrick Leahy narrowly won reelection to a second term, defeating Republican Stewart Ledbetter, the former Vermont Commissioner of Banking and Insurance.

== Background ==
The state of Vermont was a Republican stronghold, albeit one with independent leanings. For many years, the state had a predisposition for electing moderate Republicans to represent the state in the U.S. Senate. Even on the presidential level, due to a strong third party candidacy from John Anderson, who performed well in the state's presidential primary, the state became close though ultimately favoring Ronald Reagan.

Under this background, freshman Democrat Patrick Leahy, the first Democrat ever elected to represent Vermont in the United States Senate, entered his re-election campaign as one of the most vulnerable incumbents up that cycle. Leahy himself knew this would be a tough race, and even though early polls showed him up, he noticed a much more sour tone among voters while campaigning.

== Democratic primary ==
Leahy declared his bid for re-election on May 9, 1980, and was unopposed in the state's primary.

=== Results ===
Democratic primary results
Party	Candidate	Votes	%
Democratic	Patrick Leahy (incumbent)	27,548	97.54%
Democratic	Other	696	2.46%
Total votes		28,244	100.0%

== Republican primary ==
=== Candidates ===
- T. Garry Buckley, former Lieutenant Governor of Vermont
- Anthony Doria, founder of Vermont Law School
- Tom Evslin, computer consultant
- Stewart Ledbetter, former Vermont Banking and Insurance Commissioner
- James Mullin, former Chair of the Republican Party of Vermont
- Robert Schuettinger, former advisor to the Republican Study Committee

=== Campaign ===
The majority of the candidates in the Republican primary field were conservative Republicans, with Ledbetter being seen as the only moderate.

Over the course of the campaign, a dispute broke out between T. Garry Buckley, a former Lieutenant Governor, and James Mullin, the former Vermont GOP Chair. Buckley vigorously attacked Mullin for being a Mormon, claiming that if elected, Mullin would be the "third Senator from Utah." Mullin in turned accused Buckley of bigotry, stating, "I thought this nonsense went out when Jack Kennedy was elected President." The amount of spending in this primary was a record for the time.

Ledbetter, who had resigned his position to run for Senate, ran a different campaign, notably walking 450 miles across the state to gain attention for his candidacy, and to draw a contrast with Mullin's high spending campaign. He also emphasized his moderate credentials, claiming they would make him the best candidate to win the election.

=== Endorsements ===
Tom Evslin

Newspapers and publications

- Bennington Banner
- Burlington Free Press
- Lebanon Valley News
- St. Albans Daily Messenger
Stewart Ledbetter

Newspapers and publications

- Brattleboro Reformer
James Mullin

Statewide officials

- Deane Davis, former Governor of Vermont
- F. Ray Keyser, former Governor of Vermont

State officials

- Arthur Gibb, state senator
Robert Schuettinger

Executive officials

- William E. Simon, former United States Secretary of the Treasury

Federal officials

- Henry Hyde, U.S. Representative from IL-06

Organizations

- National Right to Life Committee

=== Results ===
Ledbetter would end up the victor, due in part to his appeal to the Vermont Republican establishment. On election night, he was joined by Mullin, Evslin, and Schuettinger as a sign of unity against Leahy.

Republican primary results
Party	Candidate	Votes	%
Republican	Stewart M. Ledbetter	16,518	35.28%
Republican	James E. Mullin	12,256	26.18%
Republican	Tom Evslin	8,575	18.31%
Republican	T. Garry Buckley	5,209	11.1%
Republican	Robert Schuettinger	3,450	7.39%
Republican	Anthony N. Doria	496	1.06%
Republican	Other	316	0.68%
Total votes		46,820	100.0%

== Liberty Union primary ==
=== Results ===
Liberty Union primary results
Party	Candidate	Votes	%
Liberty Union	Earl S. Gardner	135	80.36%
Liberty Union	Other	33	19.64%
Total votes		168	100.0%

== General election ==
=== Campaign ===
As the environment of 1980 became increasingly Republican leaning, Leahy faced a tough battle. Ledbetter focused on his calls for a balanced budget, and criticized Leahy for votes against spending for the B1 Bomber. In turn, Leahy criticized Ledbetter for dirty campaign tactics, which he contended went against how Vermont politics went.

There was also a large amount of attention from special interest groups targeting Leahy and other vulnerable Democrats. Owing to the successful efforts by these groups to oust Iowa Senator Dick Clark in 1978, these groups took an increasing role this cycle, adding pressure to assailable Democrats.

Per public polling, Leahy held a comfortable lead, and was the favorite to beat Ledbetter. However, he later acknowledged in his memoirs that he had seen a different mood among voters, and his internal polls, conducted late in the campaign, showed him trailing.

=== Results ===
Even though Republicans performed strongly in Vermont, winning the Presidential, Gubernatorial, and House elections, Leahy pulled ahead by a narrow margin. However, due to how close the outcome was, neither candidate claimed victory or defeat that night. In the following weeks, recounts were conducted by the state's courts to see if Leahy's victory would hold up. Ultimately, the recounts showed Leahy's victory would stand, and it would be certified. Despite protestation, Ledbetter would concede the race on December 22. This would be Patrick Leahy's closest race during his 48-year tenure in the U.S. Senate.

United States Senate election in Vermont, 1980
Party	Candidate	Votes	%
Democratic	Patrick Leahy (incumbent)	104,089	49.76%
Republican	Stewart M. Ledbetter	101,647	48.59%
Independent	Anthony N. Doria	1,764	0.84%
Liberty Union	Earl S. Gardner	1,578	0.75%
Write-in		110	0.06%
Total votes		209,188	100.00%
Democratic hold			

== See also ==
- 1980 United States Senate elections
