= VirtualPBX =

PBX technology provider

Coordinates: 37.4201°N 122.0728°W

- Type: Private
- Industry: Telecommunications
- Founded: 1997
- Founder: Stephen Lange
- Headquarters: San Jose, California
- Key people: Paul Hammond, President and CEO; Stephen Lange, Founder and Chief Technology Officer; Lon Baker, Chief Operating Officer
- Products: Hosted PBX Phone Services
- Services: Business Phone Plans, Contact Center Software, POTS Replacement Solutions, and Business Messaging
- Website: www.virtualpbx.com

VirtualPBX is an American privately held SaaS and Voice over IP provider headquartered in San Jose, California. Founded in 1997, the company is recognized as an early pioneer in the hosted PBX market, transitioning traditional hardware-based private branch exchange systems into virtual, cloud communication services.

The company provides Unified Communications as a Service (UCaaS) to small and medium-sized enterprises (SMEs), remote workforces, and enterprise-level departments. Its primary offerings include Voice over IP (VoIP) telephony, automated attendants, and advanced call routing. In recent years, the company expanded its portfolio to include VirtualText, an integrated business SMS and MMS platform designed for omnichannel customer engagement.

VirtualPBX has received various industry accolades, including multiple INTERNET TELEPHONY Product of the Year awards, and was noted for its role in supporting the infrastructure of the burgeoning "virtual office" movement in the late 1990s and early 2000s.

== History ==
The company was founded in San Francisco in 1997 by voice-based application developer Stephen Lange—now its chief technology officer—whom the company credits with coining the term virtual PBX.

Current President and CEO Paul Hammond joined the company in 2002 from BEA Systems and in 2003, company headquarters were moved to San Jose, California.

On the technology front, the company released its skills-based routing feature in 2004 and in 2006, released a number of new features including AutoRoute, which allows calls to automatically be sent directly to ACD queues, support or sales personnel, individual extensions, or voicemail, based on the caller's area code, area code and prefix, or entire phone number.

The company acquired Open Communication Systems in 2007. Its VoIP announcement included mention of a collaboration with Gizmo5, which was formally unveiled in March 2009.

== Products ==
VirtualPBX offers hosted phone plans for business customers. Several features are provided with each plan.
