= TELES =

TELES AG Informationstechnologien
- Company type: AG
- Industry: Telecommunications, next-generation networks
- Founded: Berlin, Germany (1983)
- Headquarters: Berlin, Germany
- Key people: Oliver Olbrich CEO
- Website: www.teles.com/en/teles.html

TELES AG Informationstechnologien is a provider of equipment and services to fixed, fixed-mobile convergence, and Next Generation Networking (NGN) service providers.

The company was founded in 1983 as TELES GmbH by Professor Dr.-Ing. Sigram Schindler in close cooperation with Technische Universität Berlin. Professor Schindler lectured in telecommunications at the university until 1998. In 1997, he was voted High-Tech Manager of the Year by Manager Magazine in Germany.

Active in VoIP technology development since 1996, the company's main development and operational focus lies in the areas of IMS and NGN.

TELES supplies service providers with complete Class 4 and Class 5 NGN Softswitch. TELES NGN is a standard based, scalable architecture aimed at minimizing integration time and allowing quick deployment. It includes hosted voice functionality which enables residential VoIP services, hosted PBX (IP Centrex) services, Fixed-Mobile-Convergence, IP Trunking, and additional value added applications. Classical NGN/PSTN applications like Wholesale, Long Distance, and NGN backbone services are also available with this.

The TELES product portfolio also includes VoIP gateways and mobile gateways for GSM, CDMA, and UMTS networks.

== History ==
Logo as of 1999
- 1990 ISDN product development
- 1992 ISDN PBX development
- 1993 Least-Cost-Router development
- 1996 First major VoIP patent - IntraSTAR dynamic PSTN fallback
- 1998 TELES is floated on the stock market and becomes an AG (public limited company)
- 1998 Introduction of clustered switching system for PSTN
- 2000 First public network integrating VoIP using H.323 protocol
- 2001 First highly integrated GSM and CDMA mobile gateway developed
- 2002 First integrated mobile VoIP gateway developed
- 2003 First centralized SIM server for mobile gateways developed
- 2004 STRATO AG, a webhosting TELES subsidiary, is sold to Freenet
