= ITXC Corporation =

American company

ITXC Corporation (Internet Telephony Exchange Carrier) was a US-based wholesale provider of voice over IP internet-based phone calls.

It was cofounded by Tom Evslin and his wife Mary in 1997 with seed money from AT&T and VocalTec (Nasdaq: VOCL). In 2000, it had the largest internet telephony network in the world. The company was acquired by Teleglobe Bermuda Ltd. in 2004.

== Technology ==
The technology to power ITXC's voice over IP network was initially provided by Israeli company VocalTec, who also owned 20% of the company but later sold its stake. In 2003 the company moved to exclusively use Cisco's equipment.
