= Packet telephony =

Production of voice conversation through computers and data network

Packet telephony is the use of personal computers and a packet data network to produce a voice conversation. It consists of telephony and data tightly coupled on packet-based switched multimedia networks.

The goal of packet switched fabric in both LAN and WAN, the vision in to drive voice and data over a single multimedia (packet based N/W) allowing waves to engage in a media rich communication in a natural and straightforward manner.

The packet and based fabric is capable of supporting future applications such as video streaming and video conferencing. The transaction to a new paradigm will take years to complete. However technology matures and new application proliferate packet technology will appear in broader market. There is a major distinction between Intranet telephony and VoIP.
