= Mobivox =

Mobivox was an international calling service utilizing Voice over Internet Protocol (VoIP) and Interactive Voice Response (IVR) to bring reduced rate calling to those that register as Mobivox users. Mobivox combines VoIP and IVR to create a new telephony product. This is a direct challenge to Skype as Mobivox uses many of the same principles of Skype, but works without additional hardware or software. Mobivox further distinguishes itself with its IVR component dubbed "VoxGirl" and its suite of supporting features.

== Founders and history ==
Mobivox has been founded by two entrepreneurs, Eric Reiher and Christian Varin (today at the head of Fédération des inventeurs du Québec that received significant media attention after accusations of fraud).

Mobivox began its operations in Montréal early spring of 2007, having previously existed as VoxLib. Mobivox later opened an office in Boston, MA. The full beta launch of the new Mobivox calling system occurred in May 2007, and just a few months later, in October 2007, Mobivox received an eleven million dollar investment from a group of venture capital funds led by the Boston, China, and Vietnam branches of IDG Ventures, Skypoint Capital, and Brightspark. Mobivox was named as a finalist for the 2008 Webware 100 Awards.

== Features ==
Mobivox offers several features which are available to registered users. Mobivox maintains a contact list for every user available whenever they access their account. Other features include "Instant Conferencing," "Group Calls," "Mobile to Home Call Transfer," contacts importing, "GiftVOX," and the "Call Me" button.

"Instant Conferencing" allows a caller to add up to nine people to any call. The "Group Calling" feature can be used to originate calls with up to nine different numbers. "Mobile to Home Transfers" lets a caller transfer an ongoing call on their mobile phone to their home or office phone." Using the Mobivox website, a user can import contacts from Gmail, Outlook, or Skype. "GiftVOX" enables a user to sign up their friends or family as users, add contacts to their contact list, and to provide credits to those accounts. The "Call Me" button can be embedded into email, websites, blogs, or social network profiles. The button is used to initiate a call between anyone and the user without revealing the user's phone number.

== Impact ==
Mobivox has transferred VoIP technology to mobile devices using Mobile VoIP..

== Leadership ==
Mobivox's Board of Directors includes David Aronoff of IDG Ventures as General Partner.

== End of operation ==
Mobivox ended its operation in September 2009. The assets were sold to Sabse Technologies Inc.
