= Sipservice =

SIPSERVICE was a Voice over IP (VoIP) service provider based in Switzerland that also operated in Germany and Russia.

The service offered free calls between SIPSERVICE users. In addition it offered fee-based calling packages for calls to domestic and international destinations. The service was supported by user accounts on an online portal that assigns free geographical phone numbers. Users were able to use any Session Initiation Protocol (SIP) client software, SIP analog telephony adapter (ATA), or hardware SIP phones with the service. SIP phones and other associated hardware from a variety of manufacturers were available for sale at the sipgate web site.

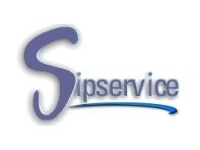
SIPSERVICE company logo

Since January 2009 SIPSERVICE provided their customers short message services (SMS) through their website. Users have been able to set the originating phone number to be that of their mobile phone.

Until 2008, SIPSERVICE also peered free of charge with a number of other VoIP providers, e.g., freenet iPhone, FreeWorldDialup, IAXtel, however this service was discontinued.

SIPSERVICE supported three different VoIP standards, SIP, IAX and H.323. There was also a reseller service available, which allowed to handle own customers and create own rates. Additional business accounts were supported which allow to have different SIP devices within one user account. Additional a call record feature was available. Recorded calls were received by mail after the call is completed.

SIPSERVICE was one of the oldest VoIP providers in Germany and Switzerland which was founded in 2006. SIPSERVICE offered whole telecommunication services and was owned by a leading telco company. There existed bundling offers which consisted of a triple play Internet access (Internet, Phone and TV). The triple play offers were dedicated to Switzerland. Bundled offers (Internet and Phone) were available in Switzerland and Germany.

At the end of 2011 did not accept new customers and was changed to a closed service for existing customers. All new signup requests where redirected to ISP-Korte who was a reseller of SIPSERVICE. During this time SIPSERVICE built up a completely new infrastructure and which extends capacity of parallel calls up to 500.000. These work took time from 2012 - 2013 for development of new technology, replacement and installing of new cloud based server infrastructure and of course a lot of beta-tests. For April 2014 SIPSERVICE announced the relaunch of its service including new designed homepage and based on new technology, which provides more stability and more allows to handle more calls and customers. So everything was in time and SIPSERVICE redesigned website is only since April 1, 2014 and accepting new signups.

== Company information ==
SIPSERVICE is served by several companies. The owner of SIPSERVICE is the Swiss based company NAG Netbone Digital Datacenter AG located in Winterthur, Switzerland (registered at the commercial register Zurich under CHE-138.647.618). The services are provided by TELEHOST Datendienste GmbH & Co. KG a company registered in Nuremberg, Germany (registered at the commercial register at the Amtsgericht Nuernberg).

== Service information ==
Based on the technology used up to 2009 SIPSERVICE was only able to handle up to fifty thousand users, cause the system was based on a server and node technology based on asterisk. Later the technology was expanded (till 2012) and SIPSERVICE used a load balancing system which was able to handle up to one million customers. This was necessary, cause SIPSERVICE started offering VoIP reseller solutions and got a lot of new customers through resellers and calling cards. The technology which was used for that service was stable, but in case of downtime there was no possibility for a fast backup recovery, cause the hard and software was hard coded. So a hardware crash take down the system for a long time, sometimes for a couple of days. This was, why SIPSERVICE was looking for new and more stable technology and separated website and VoIP servers to different networks. Now the service is completely cloud based. In case of any errors or hardware failures the system will boot simply new instances on a backup hardware. In case of a big disaster there is the possibility to transfer the whole cloud infrastructure to an external service provider like Amazon (AWS). Additional this technology allows simply to add new resources to a running system without the need of reboots or downtime. The new technology also allows additional services for customers like creating and handling a complete virtual PBX, voicemailbox, fax handling and call recording. Additional SIPSERVICE now provides DID numbers for all German local areas (Ortsnetze) and additional for all kantons in Switzerland.

For 2014 SIPSERVICE has planned to expand its service from Germany to Switzerland, Austria and Italy. All these countries will be handled by the same technology, but with different pricing and services. So the main homepage is dedicated to German customers in the future, SIPSERVICE.at for Austria, SIPSERVICE.ch for Switzerland and in Italy the company will operate as netfon.it. The country dedicated websites will start in IV/2014. Till this date every country is served by the main homepage.

== Customers and statistics ==
- 2006–2009 about 50.000 VoIP customers
- 2010 50.000 direct customers and 30 resellers with about 100 customers each (total 50.000 + 3.000 = 53.000 VoIP customers)
- 2011 100.000 direct customers and 75 resellers with about 200 customers each (total 100.000 + 15.000 = 115.000 VoIP customers)
- 2012 100.000 direct customers and 160 reseller with about 200 customers each (total 100.000 + 32.000 = 132.000 VoIP customers)

In 2010 SIPSERVICE also started providing calling card services. The calling card users did not have an own account at SIPSERVICE so they are not listed in the VoIP customers panel.

2014 SIPSERVICE is handling its 100,000 direct customers and 220 resellers with about 200 customers each (total 144.000 VoIP customers).

Calls statistics per day (average based on the total sum of yearly calls)

- 2009: 76,943 calls per day
- 2010: 134,038 calls per day from VoIP customers and 83,444 calls from calling cards (total 217,482 calls per day)
- 2011: 141,399 calls per day from VoIP customers and 178,493 calls from calling cards (total 319,892 calls per day)
- 2012: 181,492 calls per day from VoIP customers and 275,499 calls from calling cards (total 456,991 calls per day)
- 2013: 180,383 calls per day from VoIP customers and 377,392 calls from calling cards (total 557,775 calls per day)
- January 2014: 194,499 calls per day from VoIP customers and 416,488 calls from calling cards (total 610,987 calls per day)
- February 2014: 189,372 calls per day from VoIP customers and 409,842 calls from calling cards (total 599,214 calls per day)
- March 2014: 221,920 calls per day from VoIP customers and 438,942 calls from calling cards (total 660,862 calls per day)

Since April 1, 2014 the company is accepting new direct signups again.
