= CallFire =

Cloud telephony services provider

CallFire Inc. is an American telecommunications companyheadquartered in Santa Monica, California. CallFire develops web-based VoIP products and services as a business-to-business (B2B) service for small and medium-sized businesses (SMB's). The company provides cloud communication services such as voice broadcasting, power dialing, and Interactive Voice Response.

== History ==
The company was incorporated in 2006 by Dinesh Ravishanker, Vijesh Mehta, and Komnieve Singh. Punit Shah and T. J. Thinakaran joined in 2006 and 2007, respectively. Ronald Burr was hired in spring 2012.

In late December 2012, CallFire acquired EZTexting from founder and CEO Shane Neman.

== Reception ==
In 2010, CallFire ranked 285 on Inc. Magazine’s 29th annual List of America’s Fastest Growing Private Companies.

CallFire ranked 15 within the Telecommunications industry in the Los Angeles metropolitan region. Much of CallFire’s annual growth is attributed to “the growth in calls and use of its service in U.S. elections as well as Hurricane Sandy”.
