= Alon Cohen =

American businessman

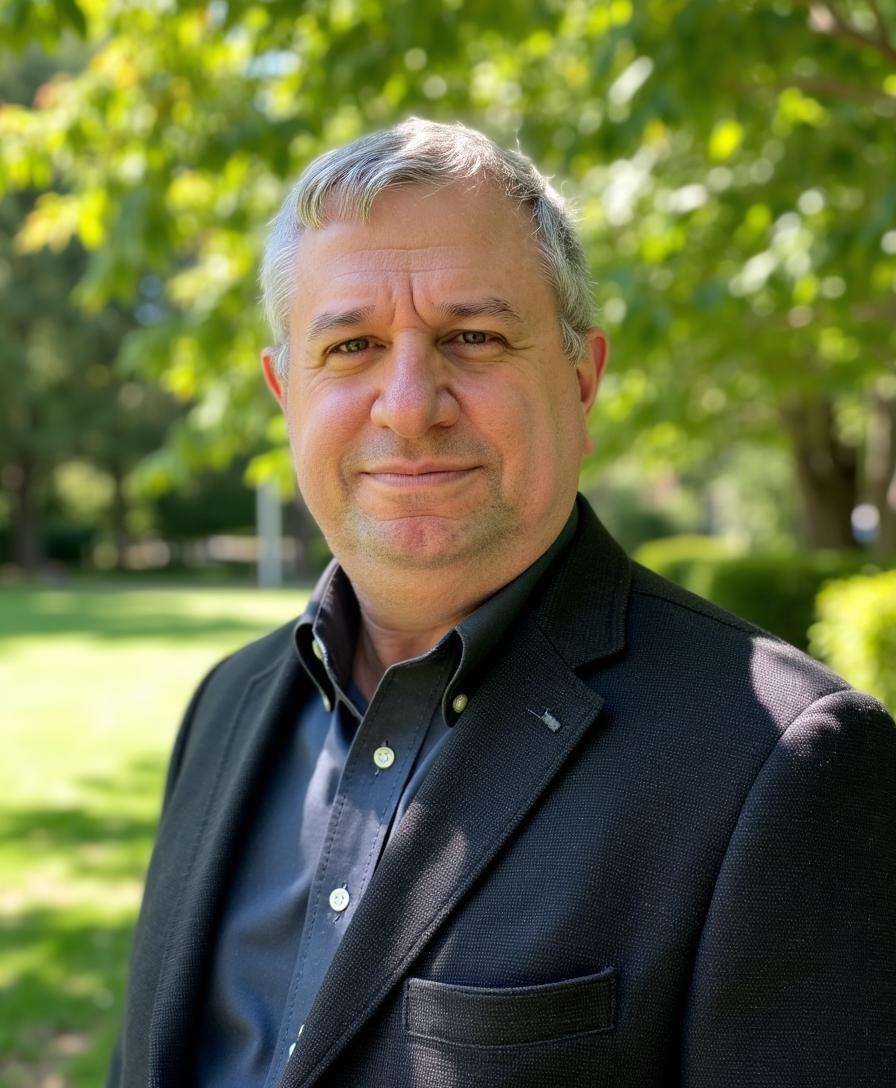
Alon Cohen

Alon Cohen (Hebrew: אלון כהן; born in Israel, 1962) is the co-founder of VocalTec Inc. (1989) and the co-inventor of the Audio Transceiver (U.S. patent 5,825,771) that enabled the creation of Voice Over Networks products and eventually the VoIP industry. Cohen holds four US patents on different communications technologies. He is currently Executive VP and CTO at Phone.com.

== Biography ==
Alon Cohen received an MBA and a BSC.EE from Tel Aviv University, both magna cum laude. He served in the Israel Defense Forces as part of the telecommunications wing.

Cohen resides in Tenafly, New Jersey with his wife.

== Business career ==
In 1989, Cohen and Lior Haramaty founded VocalTec Communications Inc. in Herzliya, Israel. The tech company is the pioneer of the VoIP industry. They released the first internet phone in February 1995. He is also the inventor of the Audio Transceiver (U.S. Patent 5,825,771) that enabled the creation of Voice Over Networks products and eventually the VoIP industry. Cohen holds five US patents on communications technologies. VocalTec is the first company to provide Internet voice technology worldwide, and in 1996 was one of the earliest Internet IPOs (NASDAQ: vocl).

After leaving VocalTec, Cohen founded and managed a series of business ventures, including BitWine and RemoteAbility. He currently serves as Executive Vice President and CTO at Phone.com.

Cohen is a frequent speaker at industry conferences, serves on technical advisory boards or as a mentor of a number of companies, and has also served as an expert witness in VoIP patent litigation trials.

Cohen has an active blog where he writes about technology and innovations.

== Awards and recognition ==
Cohen received the "VoIP Visionary Award" (2005) from Jeff Pulver's Pulvermedia. Cohen was also named, by "The Marker", the leading Israeli business newspaper, as one of the "100 Most Influential Israelis" in Israel's High Technology history in September 2005.

Cohen represented the State of Israel in the United Nations negotiations of the ITU Study Group 16 for the development and ratification of global VoIP standards.

Cohen holds five US patents on different communications technologies, and co-authored more as part of VocalTec.
