= Internet Service Providers Association (United Kingdom) =

Trade association

The Internet Service Providers Association (ISPA) is a British body representing providers of Internet services.

== History ==
ISPA was established in 1995 as the first trade association for ISPs, promoting competition, self-regulation and progress within the Internet industry. Members are signatories to the ISPA Code of "good practice" binding ISPs to a common industry standard. It was founded by and is now run under the Managing Director and Secretary General Nicholas Lansman.

== Activities ==
As a trade association, membership is voluntary but the companies who choose to become members agree to abide by the ISPA United Kingdom Code. ISPA members' allegiance to the Code means that consumers can view the ISPA UK logo as a mark of commitment to good business practice.

ISPA's main activity is in making representations on behalf of the industry to Government bodies, such as the Home Office, the Department for Business, Enterprise and Regulatory Reform (former DTI) and Ofcom. Government and political representatives often approach ISPA for its knowledge and expertise.

ISPA represents members to Government and extra-parliamentary bodies in the UK, as well as dealing with media enquiries relating to ISPs' role online. Policy is directed by the ISPA Council, representing the interests of over 100 members in the UK. ISPA spends a good deal of its time dealing with Ofcom.

The ISPA provides awards to internet services providers.

== Regulation ==
Policies are agreed by the ISPA Council, a body of up to ten people selected from and representing the various interests of the membership. The council is served by a secretariat.

== Europe ==
ISPA UK was instrumental in establishing EuroISPA, a European federation of Internet Services Providers' Associations. EuroISPA voices ISPs concerns to politicians and officials at European Union level and influences EU Internet policies. ISPA also organises "The Ispas", an annual award ceremony to showcase the "best" of the UK Internet industry.

== Controversy ==
For the 2019 ISPA awards, the finalists for the Internet Villain award were announced, where Mozilla was nominated for their proposed support for DNS-over-HTTPS (DoH). The ISPA criticised this proposal as it could be used to circumvent internet filtering. After receiving backlash, the ISPA withdrew Mozilla's nomination as well as the category altogether, however still expressed concern over the DoH protocol.

== See also ==
- London Internet Exchange
- Internet Telephony Services Providers' Association
