= PhoneGnome =

PhoneGnome was a VoIP service launched in 2005 by TelEvolution, Inc. of Danville, California, United States. It was one of the few VoIP services that opened its platform to third-party partners and developers. It was discontinued in 2014.

Initially, the service required a landline and customized Customer-premises equipment (CPE) device. To get free point-to-point calling, two units had to be purchased. In the fall of 2006, the product received a major re-vamp and was re-launched as PhoneGnome 2.0, a free service that supported web-based telephony, PC-based calling, "Bring Your Own Device" (BYOD). The original hardware was then called the "PhoneGnome box" and received a price reduction. As of July 21, 2007, the company claimed to be serving customers in over 100 countries.
