= B2X GmbH =

B2X Care Solutions GmbH
- Type: Private
- Industry: Business process outsourcing, customer service, technology
- Founded: 2007
- Founder: Karim Barkawi
- Headquarters: Munich, Germany
- Areas served: Multi-national
- Key people: Alfons Krauthausen (CEO), Dion Carter (CFO), Andrew Humphries (COO)
- Services: Customer service solutions for smartphones, IoT devices and electronic hardware
- Number of employees: 1000
- Website: https://www.b2x.com/

B2X GmbH is a German customer service outsourcing company founded in 2007 in Munich, Germany by Karim Barkawi. B2X is based on the platform SMARTCARE Technology and services smartphone and electronic device manufacturers, insurance providers, mobile network operators, and retailers.

The company operates in over 130 countries with a network of over 400 service partners and 2,000 service locations.

== History ==
The company was founded in 2007 by management consultant Karim Barkawi. In 2008, B2X took on the warranties held by Siemens Mobile after the company decided to discontinue its mobile phone operations. B2X's core business is the provision of customer service in the business process outsourcing (BPO) arena. This includes customer care and after-sales services, primarily for global smartphone and IoT brands. For example, Microsoft outsourced support for Nokia and Microsoft mobile devices to B2X in 2016.

Shortly after its launch, B2X received initial investment from Grazia Equity in 2009. In 2010, B2X announced the closing of a financing round with Earlybird. The financing was said to be used to further drive international growth and to expand the service scope to a broader range of end-product markets.

In January 2014, it was announced that it had been named as one of the final 100 businesses and Ruban d'Honneur recipients in the 2013/2014 European Business Awards. Selected as one of ten finalists in the InfoSys Business of the Year Award for companies with more than EUR 150m in revenue B2X was awarded Winner of the European Business Awards in May 2014. Furthermore, Gartner selected B2X as a Cool Vendor for Supply Chain Management in 2014.

In 2016, B2X ranked third position of the Inc. 5,000 Europe list. As of 2017, B2X had over 1,000 employees across 35 countries.

B2X’ headquarters are located in Munich, Germany. As of 2017, the company has a presence in Argentina, Australia, Belarus, Brazil, Canada, Chile, China, Colombia, Denmark, France, Greece, Hong Kong, Indonesia, Italy, Japan, Mexico, Peru, Poland, Portugal, Russia, Singapore, Slovakia, South Africa, South Korea, Spain, Sweden, Thailand, United Arab Emirates, United Kingdom, United States, Venezuela, and Vietnam. The company additionally maintains a strong presence in India.

B2X’s service range comprises backend and frontend and begins with the term SMART, followed by a description of the service application. Their backend services include SMARTLOGISTICS, SMARTREPAIR, SMARTPARTS and SMARTRECOVERY. And the frontend services include SMARTAPP, SMARTWEB, SMARTHELP and SMARTBAR.

Rainer Koppitz became B2X's Chief Executive Officer in April 2016. He had previously been CEO of Nfon, a provider of Cloud-based telephone systems. The Chairman of the Advisory Board of B2X is Lothar Pauly, who was previously CEO of T-Systems, a German global IT services and consulting company and a subsidiary of Deutsche Telekom.

Alfons Krauthausen has been CEO of the B2X Group since March 2019. He previously worked for companies CTDI, Regenersis and CompuNet.

== Recognition ==
- Third position, Inc. 5000 Europe (2016)
