= Nfon =

German telecommunications company

NFON AG
- Company type: AG
- ISIN: DE000A0N4N52
- Industry: Telecommunications
- Founded: 2007
- Founders: Marcus Otto, Mathias Edelmann, Fabian Hoppe
- Headquarters: Munich, Germany
- Key people: Andreas Wesselmann (CEO); Alexander Beck (CFO)
- Number of employees: > 500 (End of 2022)
- Website: nfon.com

NFON AG, headquartered in Munich, was founded in 2007 and is a provider of integrated cloud business communications. The company is active in 15 European countries with its own subsidiaries and a partner network.

== Business model ==
The core product is a cloud communications platform that enables voice calls, video conferencing and the integration of CRM and collaboration tools, particularly for small and medium-sized enterprises. NFON customers can use it to cover four areas: Business communication, customer contact, integration and enablement (enabling efficient work).

== Turnover and customers ==
In the 2021 financial year, the company generated turnover of 75.9 million Euros. In the following year, this figure was EUR 80.8 million. According to the company, the number of customers in mid-2023 was around 50,000 in 15 countries. Large parts of NFON's revenue are recurring, primarily through the use of cloud services and call charges.

== Organization, management, personnel, shares ==
NFON is represented by its own companies in Germany, Austria, the UK, Spain, Italy, France, Poland and Portugal. The company also works with around 3,000 partners (as of mid-2023).

Patrik Heider has headed the company as CEO since May 2023. The Management Board consists of a total of 5 people. The four-member Supervisory Board is chaired by Rainer-Christian Koppitz. At the end of 2022, the company employed more than 500 people.

The share is listed in the Prime Standard of the Frankfurt Stock Exchange. Five institutional investors held around 80 percent of the shares in December 2023.

== History ==
Marcus Otto, Mathias Edelmann and Fabian Hoppe founded the company in March 2007. Against the backdrop of the increasing popularity of Internet telephony, the founders developed a telephone system as a pure software product based on the free software Asterisk. This meant that smaller companies could also afford functions that had previously only been available in telephone systems from large companies. In addition to landline telephones, Laptops and mobile phones could also be integrated. The number of customers rose from 1,000 to around 12,000 between mid-2008 and mid-2009.

At the end of 2009, the company expanded into Austria and founded NFON GmbH, a joint venture with ipefon (based in Sankt Pölten), for this purpose. NFON attracted venture capital investors through several rounds of financing. The funds also contributed to further expansion into other European countries; at the beginning of 2015, NFON was represented in twelve countries. In 2016, Deutsche Telekom and NFON agreed on a cooperation to accelerate the transition of medium-sized companies from ISDN to Internet telephony and virtual telephone systems. The company went public on the Frankfurt Stock Exchange on May 11, 2018. At that time, the company had 150 employees serving more than 15,000 corporate customers in 13 European countries. Italy and France were added as further countries in 2019. NFON also acquired Deutsche Telefon Standard AG in spring 2019 and Onwerk GmbH a year later.
