= Web-based VoIP =

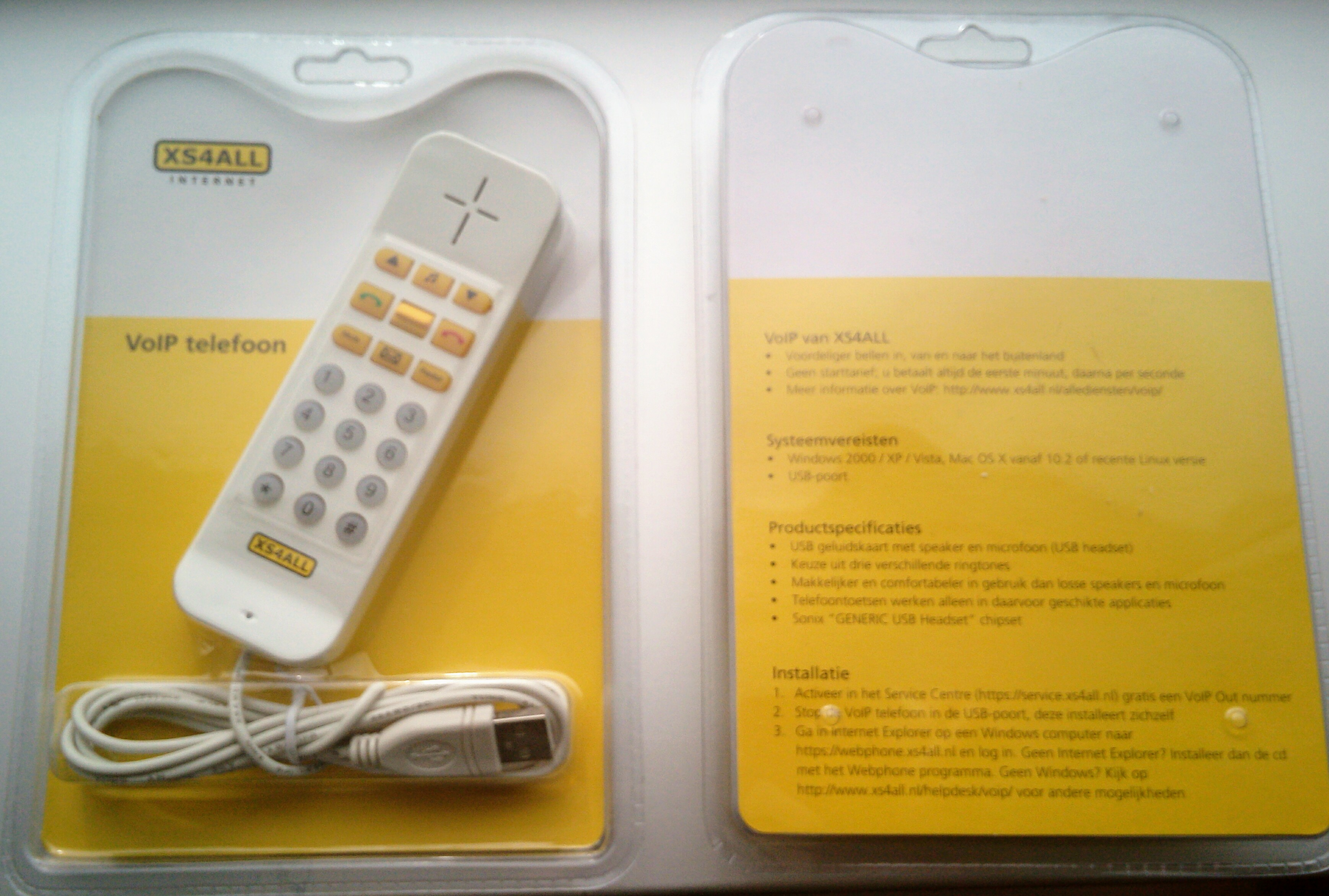
The first USB Web-based VoIP phone.

Web-based VoIP is the integration of voice over IP technologies into the facilities and methodologies of the World-Wide Web. It enables digital communication sessions between Web users or between users of traditional telecommunication services.

Instead of using dedicated, hardware-based VoIP devices, such as IP phones, analog telephone adapters, or integrated VoIP/Internet access routers, services are provided via a web page and the facilities of the user's computer or hand-held device for accessing and operating a locally attached headset and microphone. This is assisted by various software components such as Flash, Active X, Silverlight, Java applet or browser plugins like NPAPI.

Using click-to-call, for example, a web user may click on a telephone number, or some other suitable icon, embedded in a corporate web site to initiate a web-based telephone call with a customer service representative without leaving the website or using any other additional telephony equipment.

== Applications ==
- Retail customer service
- Person-to-person VoIP calls (possibly using a lookup like ENUM, or integration with services like Skype)
- Web conferences
- E-learning
- Social networking

== Protocols ==
- SIP
- XMPP
- WebRTC
- Other standards based such as H.323
- Proprietary such as Skype

== See also ==
- Cloud communications
