= Tom Evslin =

American businessman, shareware developer

Tom Evslin is a retired American businessman.

== Early life ==
Evslin is the son of author and playwright Bernard Evslin and author and teacher Dorothy Evslin. He graduated from Harvard College.

== Career ==
In 1981 and 1982 Evslin was Secretary of Transportation for the State of Vermont. He was a Republican candidate for the United States Senate from Vermont in the 1980 Senate election.

Evslin served as Chief Technology Officer for the State of Vermont. Before that he was Chief Recovery Officer responsible for coordinating the State's use of federal stimulus money under the American Recovery and Reinvestment Act (ARRA). He agreed to work for minimum wage and return that money to the State.

Evslin was the co-founder (with his wife Mary), chairman, and CEO of ITXC Corp, a provider of VoIP. The company grew from a startup in 1997 to one of the world's largest carriers of any kind by 2004 when it was acquired. In 2002 Deloitte and Touche named ITXC as the fastest growing technology company in North America.

At Microsoft, he was responsible for the server products now in Microsoft BackOffice including Microsoft Exchange. Key assets of the Evslins' software company, Solutions, Inc., were sold to Microsoft.

He was responsible for the conception, launch, and operation of AT&T's first ISP, AT&T WorldNet Service.

Evslin is the developer and publisher of GoldenDomeVT.com, a free public website containing SmartTranscripts of meetings of the 25 standing committees of the Vermont Legislature.

He was the founder and Chair of NG Advantage LLC, the first company in the United States to truck CNG to large users beyond the reach of natural gas pipelines.

== Personal life ==
A novel by Evslin, hackoff.com: an historic murder mystery set in the Internet bubble and rubble was the fiction runner-up for the 2006 Lulu Blooker Prize.
