= Lior Haramaty =

Israeli inventor (born 1966)

- ליאור הרמתי
- Born: 1966 (age 59–60); Tel-Aviv, Israel
- Occupations: Engineer, Entrepreneur
- Known for: Co-founder of VocalTec Inc., Inventor of the Audio Transceiver
- Notable work: Contributions to the VoIP industry

Lior Haramaty (Hebrew: ליאור הרמתי; born in Tel-Aviv, Israel in 1966) is the co-founder of VocalTec Inc. (1989) and the inventor of the Audio Transceiver used in the creation of Voice Over Networks products and eventually the VoIP industry as well as other patents and inventions.

VocalTec was the first company to provide commercial Internet voice technology, which in 1996 was one of the earliest successful Internet IPOs (NASDAQ: vocl).
