= Voice over IP =

Methods of delivering voice communications and multimedia over IP networks

Voice over Internet Protocol (VoIP), (Note: Variously pronounced as individual letters, V-O-I-P, or as a word, /vɔɪp/ VOYP.) also known as IP telephony, is a set of technologies used primarily for voice communication sessions over Internet Protocol (IP) networks, such as the Internet. VoIP enables voice calls to be transmitted as data packets, facilitating various methods of voice communication, including voice and video conferencing applications and appliances and VoIP phones. Regular telephones can also be used for VoIP by connecting them to the Internet via an analog telephone adapter (ATA), which converts telephone signals into digital data packets that can be transmitted over IP networks.

The broader terms Internet telephony, broadband telephony, and broadband phone service specifically refer to the delivery of voice and other communication services, such as fax, SMS, and voice messaging, over the Internet, in contrast to the traditional public switched telephone network (PSTN), commonly known as plain old telephone service (POTS).

VoIP technology has evolved to integrate with mobile telephony, including Voice over LTE (VoLTE) and Voice over NR (Vo5G), enabling seamless voice communication over mobile data networks. These advancements have extended VoIP's role beyond its traditional use in Internet-based applications. It has become a key component of modern mobile infrastructure, as 4G and 5G networks rely entirely on this technology for voice transmission.

== Overview ==
The steps and principles involved in originating VoIP telephone calls are similar to traditional digital telephony and involve signaling, channel setup, digitization of the analog voice signals, and encoding. Instead of being transmitted over a circuit-switched network, the digital information is packetized and transmission occurs as IP packets over a packet-switched network. They transport media streams using special media delivery protocols that encode audio and video with audio codecs and video codecs. Various codecs exist that optimize the media stream based on application requirements and network bandwidth; some implementations rely on narrowband and compressed speech, while others support high-fidelity stereo codecs.

The most widely used speech coding standards in VoIP are based on the linear predictive coding (LPC) and modified discrete cosine transform (MDCT) compression methods. Popular codecs include the MDCT-based AAC-LD (used in FaceTime), the LPC/MDCT-based Opus (used in WhatsApp), the LPC-based SILK (used in Skype), μ-law, A-law versions of G.711, G.722, an open source voice codec known as iLBC, and a codec that uses only 8 kbit/s each way called G.729.

Early providers of voice-over-IP services used business models and offered technical solutions that mirrored the architecture of the legacy telephone network. Second-generation providers, such as Skype, built closed networks for private user bases, offering the benefit of free calls and convenience while potentially charging for access to other communication networks, such as the PSTN. This limited the freedom of users to mix-and-match third-party hardware and software. Third-generation providers, such as Google Talk, adopted the concept of federated VoIP. These solutions typically allow dynamic interconnection between users in any two domains of the Internet, when a user wishes to place a call.

In addition to VoIP phones, VoIP is also available on many personal computers and other Internet access devices. Calls and SMS text messages may be sent via Wi-Fi or the carrier's mobile data network. VoIP provides a framework for consolidation of all modern communications technologies using a single unified communications system.

=== Integration of VoIP in mobile networks ===
VoIP technology has been adapted for use in mobile networks, leading to the development of advanced systems designed to support voice communication over modern data infrastructures. Among these are Voice over LTE (VoLTE) and Voice over 5G (Vo5G), which enable voice communication over IP-based mobile infrastructures. In contrast to traditional VoIP services, which often function independently of global telephone numbering systems, VoLTE and Vo5G are directly connected to mobile operators' infrastructures, providing seamless connectivity to the international telephone network.

VoLTE, introduced as part of 4G LTE networks, enables voice communication over an IP-based infrastructure initially developed for data transmission. It offers features such as high-definition voice (HD Voice) and faster call setup times compared to circuit-switched networks.

Vo5G, the 5G equivalent of VoLTE, utilizes the increased speed, reduced latency, and greater capacity of 5G networks to further enhance these capabilities. Both VoLTE and Vo5G maintain compatibility with traditional public switched telephone networks (PSTNs), allowing users to make and receive calls to and from any telephone number worldwide.

These technologies differ from standalone VoIP services by being fully integrated with mobile network operators. This integration ensures additional features such as emergency call support and quality-of-service guarantees, making them a central part of modern mobile telecommunication systems.

== Protocols ==
Voice over IP has been implemented with proprietary protocols and protocols based on open standards in applications such as VoIP phones, mobile applications, and web-based communications.

A variety of functions are needed to implement VoIP communication. Some protocols perform multiple functions, while others perform only a few and must be used in concert. These functions include:

- Network and transport – Creating reliable transmission over unreliable protocols, which may involve acknowledging receipt of data and retransmitting data that wasn't received.
- Session management – Creating and managing a session (sometimes glossed as simply a "call"), which is a connection between two or more peers that provides a context for further communication.
- Signaling – Performing registration (advertising one's presence and contact information) and discovery (locating someone and obtaining their contact information), dialing (including reporting call progress), negotiating capabilities, and call control (such as hold, mute, transfer/forwarding, dialing DTMF keys during a call [e.g. to interact with an automated attendant or IVR], etc.).
- Media description – Determining what type of media to send (audio, video, etc.), how to encode/decode it, and how to send/receive it (IP addresses, ports, etc.).
- Media – Transferring the actual media in the call, such as audio, video, text messages, files, etc.
- Quality of service – Providing out-of-band content or feedback about the media such as synchronization, statistics, etc.
- Security – Implementing access control, verifying the identity of other participants (computers or people), and encrypting data to protect the privacy and integrity of the media contents and/or the control messages.

VoIP protocols include:

- Matrix, open standard for online chat, voice over IP, and videotelephony
- Session Initiation Protocol (SIP), connection management protocol developed by the IETF
- H.323, one of the first VoIP call signaling and control protocols that found widespread implementation. Since the development of newer, less complex protocols such as MGCP and SIP, H.323 deployments are increasingly limited to carrying existing long-haul network traffic.
- Media Gateway Control Protocol (MGCP), connection management for media gateways
- H.248, control protocol for media gateways across a converged internetwork consisting of the traditional PSTN and modern packet networks
- Real-time Transport Protocol (RTP), transport protocol for real-time audio and video data
- Real-time Transport Control Protocol (RTCP), sister protocol for RTP providing stream statistics and status information
- Secure Real-time Transport Protocol (SRTP), encrypted version of RTP
- Session Description Protocol (SDP), a syntax for session initiation and announcement for multi-media communications and WebSocket transports.
- Inter-Asterisk eXchange (IAX), protocol used between Asterisk PBX instances
- Extensible Messaging and Presence Protocol (XMPP), instant messaging, presence information, and contact list maintenance
- Jingle, for peer-to-peer session control in XMPP
- Skype protocol, proprietary Internet telephony protocol suite based on peer-to-peer architecture

== Adoption ==
=== Consumer market ===
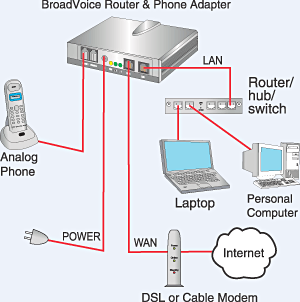
Example of residential network including VoIP

Mass-market VoIP services use existing broadband Internet access, by which subscribers place and receive telephone calls in much the same manner as they would via the PSTN. Full-service VoIP phone companies provide inbound and outbound service with direct inbound dialing. Many offer unlimited domestic calling and sometimes international calls for a flat monthly subscription fee. Phone calls between subscribers of the same provider are usually free when flat-fee service is not available.

A VoIP phone is necessary to connect to a VoIP service provider. This can be implemented in several ways:

- Dedicated VoIP phones connect directly to the IP network using technologies such as wired Ethernet or Wi-Fi. These are typically designed in the style of traditional digital business telephones.
- An analog telephone adapter connects to the network and implements the electronics and firmware to operate a conventional analog telephone attached through a modular phone jack. Some residential Internet gateways and cable modems have this function built in.
- Softphone application software installed on a networked computer that is equipped with a microphone and speaker, or headset. The application typically presents a dial pad and display field to the user to operate the application by mouse clicks or keyboard input.

=== PSTN and mobile network providers ===
It is increasingly common for telecommunications providers to use VoIP telephony over dedicated and public IP networks as a backhaul to connect switching centers and to interconnect with other telephony network providers; this is often referred to as IP backhaul.

Smartphones may have SIP clients built into the firmware or available as an application download.

=== Corporate use ===
Because of the bandwidth efficiency and low costs that VoIP technology can provide, businesses are migrating from traditional copper-wire telephone systems to VoIP systems to reduce their monthly phone costs. In 2008, 80% of all new Private branch exchange (PBX) lines installed internationally were VoIP. For example, in the United States, the Social Security Administration is converting its field offices of 63,000 workers from traditional phone installations to a VoIP infrastructure carried over its existing data network.

VoIP allows both voice and data communications to be run over a single network, which can significantly reduce infrastructure costs. The prices of extensions on VoIP are lower than for PBX and key systems. VoIP switches may run on commodity hardware, such as personal computers. Rather than closed architectures, these devices rely on standard interfaces. VoIP devices have simple, intuitive user interfaces, so users can often make simple system configuration changes. Dual-mode phones enable users to continue their conversations as they move between an outside cellular service and an internal Wi-Fi network, so that it is no longer necessary to carry both a desktop phone and a cell phone. Maintenance becomes simpler as there are fewer devices to oversee.

VoIP solutions aimed at businesses have evolved into unified communications services that treat all communications—phone calls, faxes, voice mail, e-mail, web conferences, and more—as discrete units that can all be delivered via any means and to any handset, including cellphones. Two kinds of service providers are operating in this space: one set is focused on VoIP for medium to large enterprises, while another is targeting the small-to-medium business (SMB) market.

Skype, which originally marketed itself as a service among friends, began to cater to businesses in 2009, providing free-of-charge connections between any users on the Skype network and connecting to and from ordinary PSTN telephones for a charge.

== Delivery mechanisms ==
In general, the provision of VoIP telephony systems to organizational or individual users can be divided into two primary delivery methods: private or on-premises solutions, or externally hosted solutions delivered by third-party providers. On-premises delivery methods are more akin to the classic PBX deployment model for connecting an office to local PSTN networks.

While many use cases still remain for private or on-premises VoIP systems, the wider market has been gradually shifting toward Cloud or Hosted VoIP solutions. Hosted systems are also generally better suited to smaller or personal use VoIP deployments, where a private system may not be viable for these scenarios.

=== Hosted VoIP systems ===
Hosted or Cloud VoIP solutions involve a service provider or telecommunications carrier hosting the telephone system as a software solution within their own infrastructure.

Typically, this will be one or more data centers with geographic relevance to the end-user(s) of the system. This infrastructure is external to the user of the system and is deployed and maintained by the service provider.

Endpoints, such as VoIP telephones or softphone applications (apps running on a computer or mobile device), will connect to the VoIP service remotely. These connections typically take place over public internet links, such as local fixed WAN breakout or mobile carrier service.

=== Private VoIP systems ===
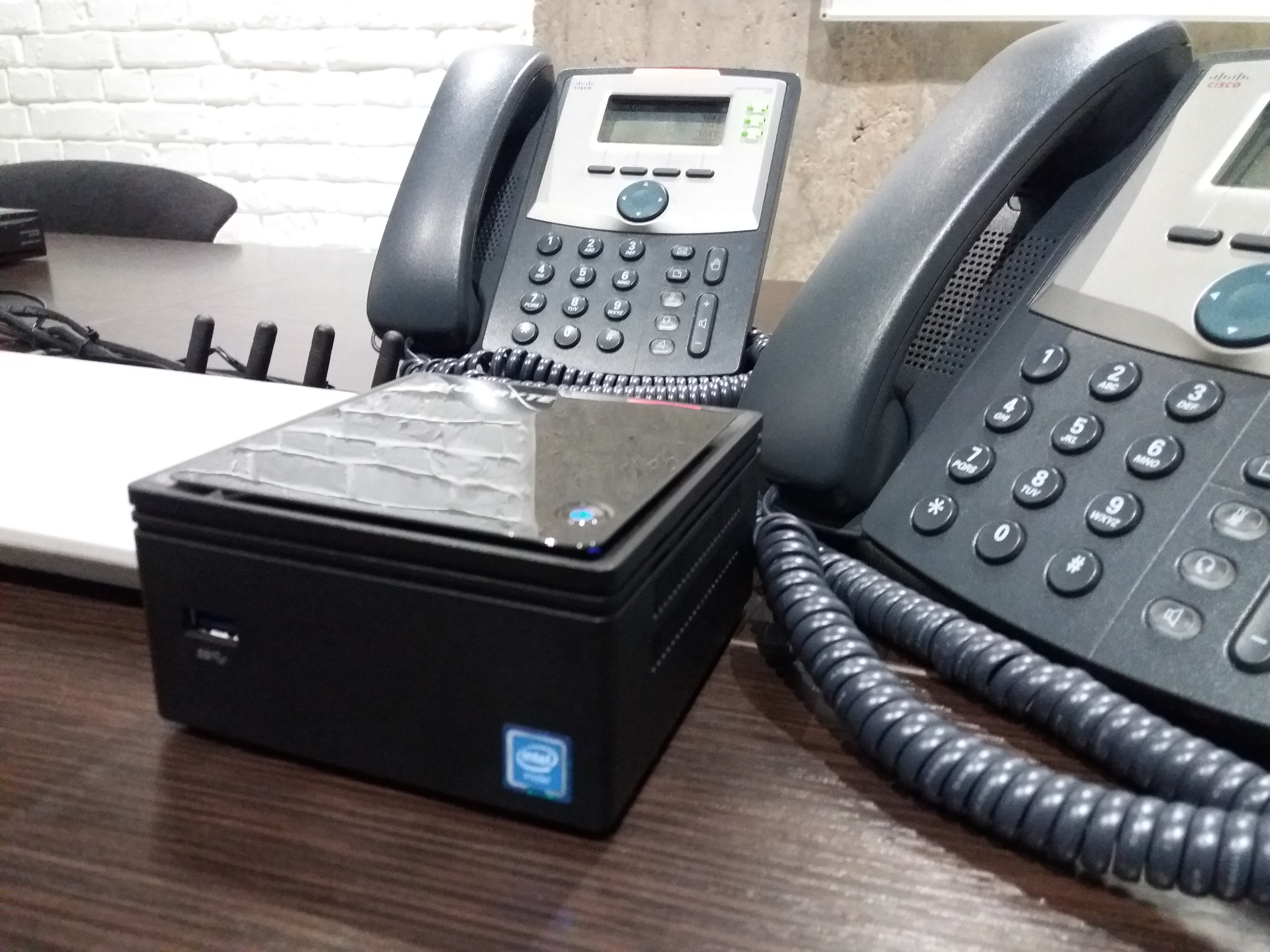
Asterisk-based PBX for small business

In the case of a private VoIP system, the primary telephony system itself is located within the private infrastructure of the end-user organization. Usually, the system will be deployed on-premises at a site within the direct control of the organization. This can provide numerous benefits in terms of QoS control (see below), cost scalability, and ensuring privacy and security of communications traffic. However, the responsibility for ensuring that the VoIP system remains performant and resilient is predominantly vested in the end-user organization. This is not the case with a Hosted VoIP solution.

Private VoIP systems can be physical hardware PBX appliances, converged with other infrastructure, or they can be deployed as software applications. Generally, the latter two options will be in the form of a separate virtualized appliance. However, in some scenarios, these systems are deployed on bare metal infrastructure or IoT devices. With some solutions, such as 3CX, companies can attempt to blend the benefits of hosted and private on-premises systems by implementing their own private solution but within an external environment. Examples can include data center collocation services, public cloud, or private cloud locations.

For on-premises systems, local endpoints within the same location typically connect directly over the LAN. For remote and external endpoints, available connectivity options mirror those of Hosted or Cloud VoIP solutions.

However, VoIP traffic to and from the on-premises systems can often also be sent over secure private links. Examples include personal VPN, site-to-site VPN, private networks such as MPLS and SD-WAN, or via private SBCs (Session Border Controllers). While exceptions and private peering options do exist, it is generally uncommon for those private connectivity methods to be provided by Hosted or Cloud VoIP providers.

== Quality of service ==
Communication on the IP network is perceived as less reliable in contrast to the circuit-switched public telephone network because it does not provide a network-based mechanism to ensure that data packets are not lost, and are delivered in sequential order. It is a best-effort network without fundamental quality of service (QoS) guarantees. Voice, and all other data, travels in packets over IP networks with fixed maximum capacity. This system may be more prone to data loss in the presence of congestion (Note: IP networks may also be more prone to DoS attacks that cause congestion.) than traditional circuit switched systems; a circuit switched system of insufficient capacity will refuse new connections while carrying the remainder without impairment, while the quality of real-time data such as telephone conversations on packet-switched networks degrades dramatically. Therefore, VoIP implementations may face problems with latency, packet loss, and jitter.

By default, network routers handle traffic on a first-come, first-served basis. Fixed delays cannot be controlled as they are caused by the physical distance the packets travel. They are especially problematic when satellite circuits are involved because of the long distance to a geostationary satellite and back; delays of 400–600 ms are typical. Latency can be minimized by marking voice packets as being delay-sensitive with QoS methods such as DiffServ.

Network routers on high-volume traffic links may introduce latency that exceeds permissible thresholds for VoIP. Excessive load on a link can cause congestion and associated queueing delays and packet loss. This signals a transport protocol like TCP to reduce its transmission rate to alleviate the congestion. But VoIP usually uses UDP, not TCP, because recovering from congestion through retransmission usually entails too much latency. So QoS mechanisms can avoid the undesirable loss of VoIP packets by immediately transmitting them ahead of any queued bulk traffic on the same link, even when the link is congested by bulk traffic.

VoIP endpoints usually have to wait for the completion of transmission of previous packets before new data may be sent. Although it is possible to preempt (abort) a less important packet in mid-transmission, this is not commonly done, especially on high-speed links where transmission times are short even for maximum-sized packets. An alternative to preemption on slower links, such as dialup and digital subscriber line (DSL), is to reduce the maximum transmission time by reducing the maximum transmission unit. But since every packet must contain protocol headers, this increases relative header overhead on every link traversed.

The receiver must resequence IP packets that arrive out of order and recover gracefully when packets arrive too late or not at all. Packet delay variation results from changes in queuing delay along a given network path due to competition from other users for the same transmission links. VoIP receivers accommodate this variation by storing incoming packets briefly in a playout buffer, deliberately increasing latency to improve the chance that each packet will be on hand when it is time for the voice engine to play it. The added delay is thus a compromise between excessive latency and excessive dropout, i.e., momentary audio interruptions.

Although jitter is a random variable, it is the sum of several other random variables that are at least somewhat independent: the individual queuing delays of the routers along the Internet path in question. Motivated by the central limit theorem, jitter can be modeled as a Gaussian random variable. This suggests continually estimating the mean delay and its standard deviation and setting the playout delay so that only packets delayed more than several standard deviations above the mean will arrive too late to be useful. In practice, the variance in latency of many Internet paths is dominated by a small number (often one) of relatively slow and congested bottleneck links. Most Internet backbone links are now so fast (e.g., 10 Gbit/s) that their delays are dominated by the transmission medium (e.g., optical fiber) and the routers driving them do not have enough buffering for queuing delays to be significant.

A number of protocols have been defined to support the reporting of quality of service (QoS) and quality of experience (QoE) for VoIP calls. These include RTP Control Protocol (RTCP) extended reports, SIP RTCP summary reports, H.460.9 Annex B (for H.323), H.248.30 and MGCP extensions.

The RTCP extended report VoIP metrics block specified by RFC 3611 is generated by an VoIP phone or gateway during a live call and contains information on packet loss rate, packet discard rate (because of jitter), packet loss/discard burst metrics (burst length/density, gap length/density), network delay, end system delay, signal/noise/echo level, mean opinion scores (MOS) and R factors and configuration information related to the jitter buffer. VoIP metrics reports are exchanged between IP endpoints on an occasional basis during a call, and an end-of-call message is sent via SIP RTCP summary report or one of the other signaling protocol extensions. VoIP metrics reports are intended to support real-time feedback related to QoS problems, the exchange of information between the endpoints for improved call quality calculation and a variety of other applications.

=== DSL and ATM ===
DSL modems typically provide Ethernet connections to local equipment, but inside they may actually be Asynchronous Transfer Mode (ATM) modems. (Note: Technologies such as 802.3ah can be used for DSL connectivity without using ATM.) They use ATM Adaptation Layer 5 (AAL5) to segment each Ethernet packet into a series of 53-byte ATM cells for transmission, reassembling them back into Ethernet frames at the receiving end.

Using a separate virtual circuit identifier (VCI) for voice over IP has the potential to reduce latency on shared connections. ATM's potential for latency reduction is greatest on slow links because worst-case latency decreases with increasing link speed. A full-size (1500 byte) Ethernet frame takes 94 ms to transmit at 128 kbit/s but only 8 ms at 1.5 Mbit/s. If this is the bottleneck link, this latency is probably small enough to ensure good VoIP performance without MTU reductions or multiple ATM VCs. The latest generations of DSL, VDSL and VDSL2, carry Ethernet without intermediate ATM/AAL5 layers, and they generally support IEEE 802.1p priority tagging so that VoIP can be queued ahead of less time-critical traffic.

ATM has substantial header overhead: 5/53 = 9.4%, roughly twice the total header overhead of a 1500-byte Ethernet frame. This ATM tax is incurred by every DSL user, whether or not they take advantage of multiple virtual circuits – and few can.

=== Layer 2 ===
Several protocols are used in the data link layer and physical layer for quality-of-service mechanisms that help VoIP applications work well even in the presence of network congestion. Some examples include:

- IEEE 802.11e is an approved amendment to the IEEE 802.11 standard that defines a set of quality-of-service enhancements for wireless LAN applications through modifications to the media access control (MAC) layer. The standard is considered of critical importance for delay-sensitive applications, such as voice over wireless IP.
- IEEE 802.1p defines 8 different classes of service (including one dedicated to voice) for traffic on layer-2 wired Ethernet.
- The ITU-T G.hn standard, which provides a way to create a high-speed (up to 1 gigabit per second) Local area network (LAN) using existing home wiring (power lines, phone lines and coaxial cables). G.hn provides QoS by means of Contention-Free Transmission Opportunities (CFTXOPs), which are allocated to flows (such as a VoIP call) that require QoS and which have negotiated a contract with the network controllers

== Performance metrics ==
The quality of voice transmission is characterized by several metrics that may be monitored by network elements and by the user agent hardware or software. Such metrics include network packet loss, packet jitter, packet latency (delay), post-dial delay, and echo. The metrics are determined by VoIP performance testing and monitoring.

== PSTN integration ==
A VoIP media gateway controller (aka Class 5 Softswitch) works in cooperation with a media gateway (aka IP Business Gateway) and connects the digital media stream, so as to complete the path for voice and data. Gateways include interfaces for connecting to standard PSTN networks. Ethernet interfaces are also included in modern systems, which are specially designed to link calls that are passed via VoIP.

E.164 is a global numbering standard for both the PSTN and public land mobile network (PLMN). Most VoIP implementations support E.164 to allow calls to be routed to and from VoIP subscribers and the PSTN/PLMN. VoIP implementations can also allow other identification techniques to be used. For example, Skype allows subscribers to choose Skype names (usernames) whereas SIP implementations can use Uniform Resource Identifier (URIs) similar to email addresses. Often VoIP implementations employ methods of translating non-E.164 identifiers to E.164 numbers and vice versa, such as the Skype-In service provided by Skype and the E.164 number to URI mapping (ENUM) service in IMS and SIP.

Echo can also be an issue for PSTN integration. Common causes of echo include impedance mismatches in analog circuitry and an acoustic path from the receive to transmit signal at the receiving end.

=== Number portability ===
Local number portability (LNP) and mobile number portability (MNP) also impact VoIP business. Number portability is a service that allows a subscriber to select a new telephone carrier without requiring a new number to be issued. Typically, it is the responsibility of the former carrier to "map" the old number to the undisclosed number assigned by the new carrier. This is achieved by maintaining a database of numbers. A dialed number is initially received by the original carrier and quickly rerouted to the new carrier. Multiple porting references must be maintained even if the subscriber returns to the original carrier. The Federal Communications Commission (FCC) mandates carrier compliance with these consumer-protection stipulations. In November 2007, the FCC in the United States released an order extending number portability obligations to interconnected VoIP providers and carriers that support VoIP providers.

A voice call originating in the VoIP environment also faces least-cost routing (LCR) challenges to reach its destination if the number is routed to a mobile phone number on a traditional mobile carrier. LCR is based on checking the destination of each telephone call as it is made, and then sending the call via the network that will cost the customer the least. This rating is subject to some debate, given the complexity of call routing created by number portability. With MNP in place, LCR providers can no longer rely on using the network root prefix to determine how to route a call. Instead, they must now determine the actual network of every number before routing the call.

Therefore, VoIP solutions also need to handle MNP when routing a voice call. In countries without a central database, like the UK, it may be necessary to query the mobile network about which home network a mobile phone number belongs to. As the popularity of VoIP increases in the enterprise markets because of LCR options, VoIP needs to provide a certain level of reliability when handling calls.

=== Emergency calls ===
A telephone connected to a land line has a direct relationship between a telephone number and a physical location, which is maintained by the telephone company and available to emergency responders via the national emergency response service centers in the form of emergency subscriber lists. When an emergency call is received by a center, the location is automatically determined from its databases and displayed on the operator console.

In IP telephony, no such direct link between location and communications end point exists. Even a provider having wired infrastructure, such as a DSL provider, may know only the approximate location of the device, based on the IP address allocated to the network router and the known service address. Some ISPs do not track the automatic assignment of IP addresses to customer equipment.

IP communication provides for device mobility. For example, a residential broadband connection may be used as a link to a virtual private network of a corporate entity, in which case the IP address being used for customer communications may belong to the enterprise, not the residential ISP. Such off-premises extensions may appear as part of an upstream IP PBX. On mobile devices, e.g., a 3G handset or USB wireless broadband adapter, the IP address has no relationship with any physical location known to the telephony service provider, since a mobile user could be anywhere in a region with network coverage, even roaming via another cellular company.

At the VoIP level, a phone or gateway may identify itself by its account credentials with a Session Initiation Protocol (SIP) registrar. In such cases, the Internet telephony service provider (ITSP) knows only that a particular user's equipment is active. Service providers often provide emergency response services by agreement with the user who registers a physical location and agrees that, if an emergency number is called from the IP device, emergency services are provided to that address only.

Such emergency services are provided by VoIP vendors in the United States by a system called Enhanced 911 (E911), based on the Wireless Communications and Public Safety Act. The VoIP E911 emergency-calling system associates a physical address with the calling party's telephone number. All VoIP providers that provide access to the public switched telephone network are required to implement E911, a service for which the subscriber may be charged. "VoIP providers may not allow customers to opt out of 911 service." The VoIP E911 system is based on a static table lookup. Unlike in cellular phones, where the location of an E911 call can be traced using assisted GPS or other methods, the VoIP E911 information is accurate only if subscribers keep their emergency address information current.

== Fax support ==
Sending faxes over VoIP networks is sometimes referred to as Fax over IP (FoIP). Transmission of fax documents was problematic in early VoIP implementations, as most voice digitization and compression codecs are optimized for the representation of the human voice and the proper timing of the modem signals cannot be guaranteed in a packet-based, connectionless network.

A standards-based solution for reliably delivering fax-over-IP is the T.38 protocol. The T.38 protocol is designed to compensate for the differences between traditional packet-less communications over analog lines and packet-based transmissions, which are the basis for IP communications. The fax machine may be a standard device connected to an analog telephone adapter (ATA), or it may be a software application or dedicated network device operating via an Ethernet interface. Originally, T.38 was designed to use UDP or TCP transmission methods across an IP network.

Some newer high-end fax machines have built-in T.38 capabilities, which are connected directly to a network switch or router. In T.38 each packet contains a portion of the data stream sent in the previous packet. Two successive packets have to be lost to actually lose data integrity.

== Power requirements ==
Telephones for traditional residential analog service are usually connected directly to telephone company phone lines, which provide direct current to power most basic analog handsets independently of locally available electrical power. The susceptibility of phone service to power failures is a common problem, even with traditional analog service, where customers purchase telephone units that operate with wireless handsets to a base station, or that have other modern phone features, such as built-in voicemail or phone book features.

VoIP phones and VoIP telephone adapters connect to routers or cable modems, which typically depend on the availability of mains electricity or locally generated power. Some VoIP service providers use customer premises equipment (e.g., cable modems) with battery-backed power supplies to assure uninterrupted service for up to several hours in case of local power failures. Such battery-backed devices are typically designed for use with analog handsets. Some VoIP service providers implement services to route calls to other telephone services of the subscriber, such as a cellular phone, in the event that the customer's network device is inaccessible to terminate the call.

== Security ==
Secure calls are possible using standardized protocols such as Secure Real-time Transport Protocol. Most of the facilities for creating a secure telephone connection over traditional phone lines, such as digitizing and digital transmission, are already in place with VoIP. It is necessary only to encrypt and authenticate the existing data stream. Automated software, such as a virtual PBX, may eliminate the need for personnel to greet and switch incoming calls.

The security concerns for VoIP telephone systems are similar to those of other Internet-connected devices. This means that hackers with knowledge of VoIP vulnerabilities can perform denial-of-service attacks, harvest customer data, record conversations, and compromise voicemail messages. Compromised VoIP user account or session credentials may enable an attacker to incur substantial charges from third-party services, such as long-distance or international calling.

The technical details of many VoIP protocols create challenges in routing VoIP traffic through firewalls and network address translators, used to interconnect to transit networks or the Internet. Private session border controllers are often employed to enable VoIP calls to and from protected networks. Other methods to traverse NAT devices involve assistive protocols such as STUN and Interactive Connectivity Establishment (ICE).

Standards for securing VoIP are available in the Secure Real-time Transport Protocol (SRTP) and the ZRTP protocol for analog telephony adapters, as well as for some softphones. IPsec is available to secure point-to-point VoIP at the transport level by using opportunistic encryption. Though many consumer VoIP solutions do not support encryption of the signaling path or the media, securing a VoIP phone is conceptually easier to implement using VoIP than on traditional telephone circuits. A result of the lack of widespread support for encryption is that it is relatively easy to eavesdrop on VoIP calls when access to the data network is possible. Free open-source solutions, such as Wireshark, facilitate capturing VoIP conversations.

Government and military organizations use various security measures to protect VoIP traffic, such as voice over secure IP (VoSIP), secure voice over IP (SVoIP), and secure voice over secure IP (SVoSIP). The distinction lies in whether encryption is applied in the telephone endpoint or in the network. Secure voice over secure IP may be implemented by encrypting the media with protocols such as SRTP and ZRTP. Secure voice over IP uses Type 1 encryption on a classified network, such as SIPRNet. Public Secure VoIP is also available with free GNU software and in many popular commercial VoIP programs via libraries, such as ZRTP.

In June 2021, the National Security Agency (NSA) released comprehensive documents describing the four attack planes of a communications system – the network, perimeter, session controllers and endpoints – and explaining security risks and mitigation techniques for each of them.

== Caller ID ==
Voice over IP protocols and equipment provide caller ID support that is compatible with the PSTN. Many VoIP service providers also allow callers to configure custom caller ID information.

== Hearing aid compatibility ==
Wireline telephones which are manufactured in, imported to, or intended to be used in the US with Voice over IP service, on or after February 28, 2020, are required to meet the hearing aid compatibility requirements set forth by the Federal Communications Commission.

== Operational cost ==
VoIP has drastically reduced the cost of communication by sharing network infrastructure between data and voice. A single broadband connection has the ability to transmit multiple telephone calls.

== Regulatory and legal issues ==
As the popularity of VoIP grows, governments are becoming more interested in regulating VoIP in a manner similar to PSTN services.

Throughout the developing world, particularly in countries where regulation is weak or captured by the dominant operator, restrictions on the use of VoIP are often imposed, including in Panama where VoIP is taxed, Guyana, where VoIP is prohibited. In Ethiopia, where the government is nationalizing telecommunication service, it is a criminal offense to offer services using VoIP. The country has installed firewalls to prevent international calls from being made using VoIP. These measures were taken after the popularity of VoIP reduced the income generated by the state-owned telecommunications company.

=== Canada ===
In Canada, the Canadian Radio-television and Telecommunications Commission regulates telephone service, including VoIP telephony service. VoIP services operating in Canada are required to provide 9-1-1 emergency service.

=== European Union ===
In the European Union, the treatment of VoIP service providers is a decision for each national telecommunications regulator, which must use competition law to define relevant national markets and then determine whether any service provider on those national markets has "significant market power" (and so should be subject to certain obligations). A general distinction is usually made between VoIP services that function over managed networks (via broadband connections) and VoIP services that function over unmanaged networks (essentially, the Internet).

The relevant EU Directive is not clearly drafted concerning obligations that can exist independently of market power (e.g., the obligation to offer access to emergency calls), and it is impossible to say definitively whether VoIP service providers of either type are bound by them.

=== Arab states of the GCC ===
==== Oman ====
In Oman, it is illegal to provide or use unauthorized VoIP services, to the extent that websites of unlicensed VoIP providers have been blocked. Violations may be punished with fines of 50,000 Omani Rial (about 130,317 US dollars), a two-year prison sentence or both. In 2009, police raided 121 Internet cafes throughout the country and arrested 212 people for using or providing VoIP services.

==== Saudi Arabia ====
In September 2017, Saudi Arabia lifted the ban on VoIPs, in an attempt to reduce operational costs and spur digital entrepreneurship.

==== United Arab Emirates ====
In the United Arab Emirates (UAE), it is illegal to provide or use unauthorized VoIP services. Websites of unlicensed VoIP providers have been blocked. Some VoIP services, such as Skype, were allowed. In January 2018, internet service providers in UAE blocked all VoIP apps, including Skype, but permitting only 2 government-approved VoIP apps (C'ME and BOTIM). In opposition, a petition on Change.org garnered over 5000 signatures, in response to which the website was blocked in UAE.

On March 24, 2020, the United Arab Emirates loosened restrictions on VoIP services earlier prohibited in the country, to ease communication during the COVID-19 pandemic. However, popular instant messaging applications such as WhatsApp, Skype, and FaceTime remained blocked from being used for voice and video calls, constricting residents to use paid services from the country's state-owned telecom providers.

=== India ===
In India, it is legal to use VoIP, but it is illegal to have VoIP gateways inside India. This effectively means that people who have PCs can use them to make a VoIP call to other computers but not to a normal phone number. Foreign-based VoIP server services are illegal to use in India.

Internet telephony is permitted to the ISP with restrictions. The following services are permitted:

1. PC to PC; within or outside India
2. PC / a device / Adapter conforming to the standard of any international agencies like ITU or IETF, etc., in India to PSTN/PLMN abroad.
3. Any device / Adapter conforming to standards of International agencies like ITU, IETF etc., connected to ISP node with static IP address to similar device / Adapter; within or outside India.
4. Except whatever is described in condition (ii) above, no other form of Internet Telephony is permitted.
5. In India no Separate Numbering Scheme is provided to the Internet Telephony. Presently the 10-digit Numbering allocation based on E.164 is permitted to the Fixed Telephony, GSM, CDMA wireless service. For Internet Telephony, the numbering scheme shall only conform to IP addressing Scheme of Internet Assigned Numbers Authority (IANA). Translation of E.164 number / private number to IP address allotted to any device and vice versa, by ISP to show compliance with IANA numbering scheme is not permitted.
6. The Internet Service Licensee is not permitted to have PSTN/PLMN connectivity. Voice communication to and from a telephone connected to PSTN/PLMN and following E.164 numbering is prohibited in India.

=== South Korea ===
In South Korea, only providers registered with the government are authorized to offer VoIP services. Unlike many VoIP providers, most of whom offer flat rates, Korean VoIP services are generally metered and charged at rates similar to terrestrial calling. Foreign VoIP providers encounter high barriers to government registration. This issue came to a head in 2006 when Internet service providers providing personal Internet services by contract to United States Forces Korea (USFK) members residing on USFK bases threatened to block off access to VoIP services used by USFK members as an economical way to keep in contact with their families in the United States, on the grounds that the service members' VoIP providers were not registered. A compromise was reached between USFK and Korean telecommunications officials in January 2007, wherein USFK service members arriving in Korea before June 1, 2007, and subscribing to the ISP services provided on base could continue to use their US-based VoIP subscription, but later arrivals are required to use a Korean-based VoIP provider, which by contract will offer pricing similar to the flat rates offered by US VoIP providers.

=== United States ===
In the United States, the FCC requires all interconnected VoIP service providers to comply with requirements comparable to those for traditional telecommunications service providers. VoIP operators in the US are required to support local number portability; make service accessible to people with disabilities; pay regulatory fees, universal service contributions, and other mandated payments; and enable law enforcement authorities to conduct surveillance pursuant to the Communications Assistance for Law Enforcement Act (CALEA).

Operators of Interconnected VoIP (fully connected to the PSTN) are mandated to provide Enhanced 911 service without special request, provide for customer location updates, clearly disclose any limitations on their E-911 functionality to their consumers, obtain affirmative acknowledgements of these disclosures from all consumers, and may not allow their customers to opt-out of 911 service. VoIP operators also receive the benefit of certain US telecommunications regulations, including an entitlement to interconnection and exchange of traffic with incumbent local exchange carriers via wholesale carriers. Providers of nomadic VoIP service—those who are unable to determine the location of their users—are exempt from state telecommunications regulation.

Another legal issue that the US Congress is debating concerns changes to the Foreign Intelligence Surveillance Act. The issue in question is calls between Americans and foreigners. The NSA is not authorized to tap Americans' conversations without a warrant—but the Internet, and specifically VoIP does not draw as clear a line to the location of a caller or a call's recipient as the traditional phone system does. As VoIP's low cost and flexibility convince more and more organizations to adopt the technology, surveillance for law enforcement agencies becomes more difficult. VoIP technology has also increased federal security concerns because VoIP and similar technologies have made it more difficult for the government to determine where a target is physically located when communications are being intercepted, and that creates a whole set of new legal challenges.

== History ==
The early developments of packet network designs by Paul Baran and other researchers were motivated by a desire for a higher degree of circuit redundancy and network availability in the face of infrastructure failures than was possible in the circuit-switched networks in telecommunications of the mid-twentieth century. Danny Cohen first demonstrated a form of packet voice in 1973 which was developed into Network Voice Protocol which operated across the early ARPANET.

On the early ARPANET, real-time voice communication was not possible with uncompressed pulse-code modulation (PCM) digital speech packets, which had a bit rate of 64 kbps, much greater than the 2.4 kbps bandwidth of early modems. The solution to this problem was linear predictive coding (LPC), a speech coding data compression algorithm that was first proposed by Fumitada Itakura of Nagoya University and Shuzo Saito of Nippon Telegraph and Telephone (NTT) in 1966. LPC was capable of speech compression down to 2.4 kbps, leading to the first successful real-time conversation over ARPANET in 1974, between Culler-Harrison Incorporated in Goleta, California, and MIT Lincoln Laboratory in Lexington, Massachusetts. LPC has since been the most widely used speech coding method. Code-excited linear prediction (CELP), a type of LPC algorithm, was developed by Manfred R. Schroeder and Bishnu S. Atal in 1985. LPC algorithms remain an audio coding standard in modern VoIP technology.

In the two decades following the 1974 demo, various forms of packet telephony were developed and industry interest groups formed to support the new technologies. Following the termination of the ARPANET project, and expansion of the Internet for commercial traffic, IP telephony was tested and deemed infeasible for commercial use until the introduction of VocalChat in the early 1990s and then in Feb 1995 the official release of Internet Phone (or iPhone for short) commercial software by VocalTec, based on a patent by Lior Haramaty and Alon Cohen, and followed by other VoIP infrastructure components such as telephony gateways and switching servers. Soon after it became an established area of interest in commercial labs of the major IT concerns, notably at AT&T, where Marian Croak and her team filed many patents related to the technology. By the late 1990s, the first softswitches became available, and new protocols, such as H.323, MGCP and Session Initiation Protocol (SIP) gained widespread attention. In the early 2000s, the proliferation of high-bandwidth always-on Internet connections to residential dwellings and businesses spawned an industry of Internet telephony service providers (ITSPs). The development of open-source telephony software, such as Asterisk PBX, fueled widespread interest and entrepreneurship in voice-over-IP services, applying new Internet technology paradigms, such as cloud services to telephony.

=== Milestones ===
- 1966: Linear predictive coding (LPC) proposed by Fumitada Itakura of Nagoya University and Shuzo Saito of Nippon Telegraph and Telephone (NTT).
- 1973: Packet voice application by Danny Cohen.
- 1974: The Institute of Electrical and Electronics Engineers (IEEE) publishes a paper entitled "A Protocol for Packet Network Interconnection".
- 1974: Network Voice Protocol (NVP) tested over ARPANET in August 1974, carrying barely intelligible 16 kpbs CVSD encoded voice.
- 1974: The first successful real-time conversation over ARPANET was achieved using 2.4 kpbs LPC, between Culler-Harrison Incorporated in Goleta, California, and MIT Lincoln Laboratory in Lexington, Massachusetts.
- 1977: Danny Cohen and Jon Postel of the USC Information Sciences Institute, and Vint Cerf of the Defense Advanced Research Projects Agency (DARPA), agree to separate IP from TCP, and create UDP for carrying real-time traffic.
- 1981: IPv4 is described in RFC 791.
- 1985: The National Science Foundation commissions the creation of NSFNET.
- 1985: Code-excited linear prediction (CELP), a type of LPC algorithm, developed by Manfred R. Schroeder and Bishnu S. Atal.
- 1986: Proposals from various standards organizations for Voice over ATM, in addition to commercial packet voice products from companies such as StrataCom
- 1991: Speak Freely, a voice-over-IP application, was released to the public domain.
- 1992: The Frame Relay Forum conducts development of standards for voice over Frame Relay.
- 1992: InSoft Inc. announces and launches its desktop conferencing product Communique, which includes VoIP and video. The company is credited with developing the first generation of commercial, US-based VoIP, Internet media streaming and real-time Internet telephony/collaborative software and standards that would provide the basis for the Real Time Streaming Protocol (RTSP) standard.
- 1993 Release of VocalChat, a commercial packet network PC voice communication software from VocalTec.
- 1994: MTALK, a freeware LAN VoIP application for Linux
- 1995:
  - VocalTec releases Internet Phone commercial Internet phone software.
  - Intel, Microsoft and Radvision initiated standardization activities for VoIP communications system.
- 1996:
  - ITU-T begins development of standards for the transmission and signaling of voice communications over Internet Protocol networks with the H.323 standard.
  - US telecommunications companies petition the US Congress to ban Internet phone technology.
  - G.729 speech codec introduced, using CELP (LPC) algorithm.
- 1997: Level 3 began development of its first softswitch, a term they coined in 1998.
- 1999:
  - The Session Initiation Protocol (SIP) specification RFC 2543 is released.
  - Mark Spencer of Digium develops Asterisk, the first open source private branch exchange (PBX) software.
  - A discrete cosine transform (DCT) variant called the modified discrete cosine transform (MDCT) is adopted for the Siren codec, used in the G.722.1 wideband audio coding standard.
  - The MDCT is adapted into the LD-MDCT algorithm, used in the AAC-LD standard.
- 2001: INOC-DBA, the first inter-provider SIP network is deployed; this is also the first voice network to reach all seven continents.
- 2003: Skype released in August 2003. This was the creation of Niklas Zennström and Janus Friis, in cooperation with four Estonian developers. It quickly became a popular program that helped democratize VoIP.
- 2004: Early commercial VoIP service providers proliferate.
- 2005: PhoneGnome VoIP service is launched by TelEvolution, Inc. of California.
- 2006: G.729.1 wideband codec introduced, using MDCT and CELP (LPC) algorithms.
- 2007: VoIP device manufacturers and sellers boom in Asia, specifically in the Philippines where many families of overseas workers reside.
- 2009: SILK codec introduced, using LPC algorithm, and used for voice calling in Skype.
- 2010: Apple introduces FaceTime, which uses the LD-MDCT-based AAC-LD codec.
- 2011:
  - Rise of WebRTC technology, which supports VoIP directly in browsers.
  - CELT codec introduced, using MDCT algorithm.
- 2012: Opus codec introduced, using MDCT and LPC algorithms.

== See also ==
- Audio over IP
- Call-through telecom
- Comparison of audio network protocols
- Comparison of VoIP software
- Differentiated services
- High Bit Rate Media Transport
- Integrated services
- Internet fax
- IP Multimedia Subsystem
- List of VoIP companies
- Mobile VoIP
- RTP payload formats
- SIP trunking
- UNIStim
- Voice over LTE
- VoiceXML
- VoIP VPN
- VoIP recording
