= Impractical Jokers season 6 =

Impractical Jokers
- Season 6
- No. of episodes: 26

Release
- Original network: truTV
- Original release: February 9 – November 2, 2017

Season chronology
- ← Previous; Season 5 Next → Season 7

This is a list of episodes from the sixth season of Impractical Jokers.

== Episodes ==
No. overall	No. in season	Title	Original air date	Losing Joker(s)	U.S. viewers (millions)
128	1	"Swim Shady"	February 9, 2017	Sal	0.97
The guys act as receptionists in a waiting room and ask strangers at the park for advice about their personal dilemmas. Punishment: Sal is forced to invade a water aerobics class to take pictures for a website. He must invade the students' privacy in order to get shots.
129	2	"Lady and the Tramp"	February 16, 2017	Murr	0.83
The guys conduct interviews while the others try to make them laugh from behind a two-way mirror and compete head-to-head in a grocery store to see who can get a customer to try more samples. Punishment: In a surprise punishment, Murr enters a car to drive to what he thinks is a challenge, but it turns out to be Murr being "taken" onto on a tow truck and then onto a ferry. In the New York Harbor, he then has to board a smaller boat and dress up and pose as the Statue of Liberty in cold weather while other tourist boats float by and take pictures.
130	3	"The Parent Trap"	February 23, 2017	Joe	0.76
The guys go head-to-head putting sticky notes on customers in a grocery store, ask strangers for questionable quotes at the park, and give "sound" financial tips to hopefuls as advisors. Punishment: Being the only parent out of the quartet, Joe is forced to enter an indoor playground for children, and instruct other parents on how to better parent their children.
131	4	"Catastrophe"	March 2, 2017	Sal	0.82
The guys pose as trainees at a juice bar, and compete at the Palisades Center mall to have someone untangle their earphone cords before having their pants pulled down by a special guest (Tommy Dreamer, Bully Ray, and Velvet Sky). Punishment: Sal is forced to go through what Q went through in "Spider Man" with his biggest fear: cats.
132	5	"Vampire Weakened"	March 9, 2017	Murr	0.85
The jokers work at a Carvel ice cream parlor, and get strangers to help them watch Joe's dogs at a park. Punishment: Murr is forced to perform in front of an audience as Dracula to deliver his character's monologues. In a surprise twist, it turns out he actually has to sing and dance along with a gospel choir while wearing his Dracula outfit.
133	6	"Footloose"	March 23, 2017	Sal	0.84
The guys try not to laugh at a list of gag names as receptionists and try to get good ratings for their dating profiles in the park. Punishment: At the New York Boat Show, Sal is forced to rub people's feet using various condiments. Note: Following Joe Gatto's departure in December 2021, this episode has been banned from airing on television, along with seven other episodes involving Joe in a "compromising situation."
134	7	"X Man"	March 30, 2017	Q	0.75
The guys compete in a first ever four-way try not to laugh challenge in a waiting room, ask park-goers if they agree or disagree on an odd topic, and try to lead a kid's art class as the teachers. Punishment: With Q taking the final loss where he refused to cross out one child's painting with red paint, the surprise punishment forced him to paint a red "X" over every painting instead.
135	8	"Medium, Well Done"	April 6, 2017	Sal	1.04
The guys compete head-to-head posing odd TV shows as execs to the public and team up to work the counter at a BBQ joint. Punishment: In ""Psychotic Not-Line"", Sal had to pose as a psychic for his punishment that does not end until he predicts something accurate. Now, an actual psychic named Jesse Bravo is predicting Sal's life according to the other jokers (most of it did not actually happen). Sal must say that those predictions are correct in front of an audience.
136	9	"Drum and Drummer"	April 13, 2017	Q and Joe	0.77
The guys try to get shoppers to repeat an odd catchphrase given by the other guys and do what they are told as psychoanalysts. Punishment: As revenge for the punishment that Murr and Sal went through in "HellCopter", Q and Joe are forced participate in a drumline marching band, followed by dancing.
137	10	"The Butt of the Joker"	April 20, 2017	Murr	0.88
The guys team up to work in pairs giving presentations about living life to its fullest while one of them hypes the other up as a member of the audience and pose as janitors at a mall food court giving responses to questions and statements over walkie-talkies. Punishment: Murr is forced to yank and put out cigarettes from smokers. The punishment does not end until Murr acquires a whole pack of cigarettes from a smoker, forcing Murr to trade his expensive suit jacket for a pack.
138	11	"Stuffed Turkey"	April 27, 2017	Q	0.78
The guys act as not-so-handy-men assembling furniture, team up to drop underwear into shopper's bags at the mall, and mistake strangers for someone they know at the supermarket. Punishment: Q is forced to attend a speed dating event while his hands have two very large turkey legs attached to them, and the punishment does not end until he eats all of the turkey.
139	12	"Crickets"	May 4, 2017	Sal	0.71
The guys work as salesmen for Lids and team up to serve some confused customers at Joey Fatone's hot dog joint. Punishment: Sal is forced to perform a stand-up comedy routine for business people at the end of a three-day conference, but must purposely perform badly.
140	13	"Universal Appeal"	May 11, 2017	Q	0.94
The guys go to Universal Orlando Resort for an hour episode. They pose as waiting line employees for Transformers: The Ride, then ride Jurassic Park: The Ride but Harry Potter actor Matthew Lewis fills in for Sal, also act as information guides and try to find their missing wives. Punishment: Q is forced to dress as a spider and perform on stage in a barnyard stunt show at the Toon Lagoon Theater; he also has to protect the barnyard from a mixed martial arts master dressed as a cow.
141	14	"Paradise Lost"	July 13, 2017	Murr	1.17
In an hour-long special episode in Hawaii, the guys attempt to get tips as fortune tellers, go head-to-head getting strangers to pass along messages, ask strangers if their "proposal" is ready, written by the other guys, team up to give presentations on Hawaiian culture, and invade stranger's towel space at the beach. Punishment: In part two of Q's revenge for the "Spider Man" punishment, Q punishes Murr with his number two fear: swimming with sharks.
142	15	"Mime and Punishment"	July 20, 2017	Q	0.94
The guys do and say what they are told while posing as meditation instructors, and attempt to get secrets from strangers. Punishment: Q is forced to pose handcuffed to a mime for 24 hours while all of the jokers are on tour.
143	16	"Three Men and Your Baby"	July 27, 2017	Q, Murr and Sal	0.83
The guys pose as fashion photographers with models and get strangers to fill out their questionnaires with messed up hands. Punishment: As revenge for the parent punishment in "The Parent Trap", Joe forces the guys to pitch their television show "3 Men & Your Baby", where they give parental tips. Joe is the only parent of the four and the others do not know anything about parenting.
144	17	"The Q-Pay"	August 3, 2017	Murr	1.02
The guys get strangers' help to reply to text messages in a waiting room, compete head-to-head playing each other's "wingman" at a mingling event, and attempt to get strangers' encouragement in odd dilemmas. Punishment: Murr is forced to wear Q's hair as a wig for the rest of the season and must also apply for a new passport photo while wearing Q's hair.
145	18	"Rubbed the Wrong Way"	August 10, 2017	Joe	0.96
The guys "encourage" strangers to reply to their text messages at a mall food court, and team up going head-to-head to play catch with other people's groceries at a supermarket. Punishment: Joe is forced to portray a genie in a play; however, the guys control his harness, so they kept swinging Joe into the props and set pieces the entire time.
146	19	"Flatfoot the Pirate"	August 17, 2017	Sal	0.91
The guys try to justify a humiliating soaking at Spencer's in Willowbrook Mall, play the "Laugh Man Standing" challenge, and record stranger's conversations at a park. Punishment: Sal is forced to pose as a pirate for a children's event, but the real punishment is he must drink a cup of a woman's breast milk. Murr, who is assisting Sal in the event, is tricked into thinking that he also lost and drinks some breast milk as well, ultimately to find that he did not lose after all. In the end, the "crew" mutinies against Sal and force him to "walk the plank" - right into some murky filthy waters of the New Jersey river.
147	20	"Remember the Pact"	August 24, 2017	Murr	0.96
Murr, Sal, Joe and Q beg supermarket shoppers to hold on to a weird item for them, then make conversation in a park utilizing some outrageous words. Later, the guys volunteer to help teach tech to senior citizens. Punishment: After a successful secret pact goes off without a hitch, Murr's turn is turned into an impromptu punishment; he has to show his father on a monitor what is on his cellphone, such as embarrassing videos, pictures, etc.
148	21	"Silence of the Lame"	August 31, 2017	Sal	0.92
The guys compete head-to-head as toy inventors and must get strangers to approve emails written by the other guys. Punishment: In Willowbrook Mall food court, Sal is forced to shush people for no reason. Eventually he runs away and hides out of embarrassment.
149	22	"The Walking Dread"	September 14, 2017	Sal	0.83
The guys pose as employees at Brooklyn Botanic Garden and team up to take turns dipping fries into other people's food at Willowbrook Mall food court. Punishment: Sal is forced to enter a sewer and rescue his two nieces while being attacked by zombies.
150	23	"Take Me Out at The Ball Game"	September 28, 2017	Joe	1.00
The guys completed assigned tasks at Universal Orlando Resort's Volcano Bay water park, go head-to-head playing another round of TP basketball shootout at the grocery store, and go head-to-head playing a game of hot potato with a strange item across a stranger in the park. Punishment: Joe goes to Citi Field, home of the New York Mets, and is forced to steal autographed baseballs that Noah Syndergaard autographs for children. Eventually, a furious mother snaps at Joe, leading Joe to leave embarrassed.
151	24	"The Party Crasher"	October 5, 2017	Murr	0.74
The guys dodge shakedowns at the park, go head-to-head to see who can cling to a car the longest, and go head-to-head playing a game of attaching ribbons to strangers. Punishment: Murr is forced to attend a cocktail party while repeatedly trying to pin Kayla Harrison, an Olympic Judo gold medalist.
152	25	"Dover and Out"	October 12, 2017	Q	0.77
The guys survey employees about customer satisfaction, and go cloud watching with strangers in the park. Punishment: Q is forced to pose as an artist presenting a town mural to the town of Dover, New Jersey to its residents (including the whole board and the mayor) that says "DOVER SUCKS", and must talk his way out of it.
153	26	"G.I. Jokers"	November 2, 2017	Murr, then Q	0.87
In this hour-long season finale that is part salute-to-the-troops, part pre-recorded challenges in front of an audience at the Museum of American Armor, the Jokers team up to give phony presentations about aviation at the American Airpower Museum, plant American flags onto unsuspecting shoppers, and try to get a handshake after showing off their dubious rewards. The episode also features three veterans who receive the same three tattoos Q, Murr and Sal got in "The Permanent Punishment" and a visit to the Wounded Warrior Project. Punishment: Murr is forced to ride shotgun in a fighter aircraft; then later, Q is forced to watch as his prized Jeep Wrangler is destroyed by a M18 Hellcat.

Punishment Count:

- Sal - 9 (including joint punishments) Total now: 52
- Joe - 4 (including joint punishments) Total now: 33
- Murr - 9 (including joint punishments) Total now: 47
- Q - 8 (including joint punishments) Total now: 38
