= Impractical Jokers season 5 =

Impractical Jokers
- Season 5
- No. of episodes: 26

Release
- Original network: truTV
- Original release: February 11 – November 3, 2016

Season chronology
- ← Previous; Season 4 Next → Season 6

This is a list of episodes from the fifth season of Impractical Jokers.

== Episodes ==
No. overall	No. in season	Title	Original air date	Losing Joker(s)	U.S. viewers (millions)
102	1	"HellCopter"	February 11, 2016	Murr and Sal	1.04
The guys work as receptionists in a waiting room, and try to mingle with the stiff crowd at the world famous Madame Tussauds wax museum in New York. Punishment: Murr and Sal made a bet that they can beat each other in a foot race. Since Murr does not weigh as much as Sal does, he will be forced to wear a fatsuit while racing. The fatsuit slowed him down to the point where he lost his momentum, thus causing Sal to win the race. They are then forced to ride a helicopter with one seat; Sal as the winner of the race receives the seat as his prize, and since Murr lost he has to sit on the side of the helicopter. Q and Joe (knowing that Murr does not have his fatsuit on anymore), told the guys that the helicopter was about to crash, and the heaviest must jump out to prevent that from happening, Sal did not think Joe was serious for a second (since he won the race), but with scared hesitation he jumped out of the helicopter into a lake, despite winning the seat.
103	2	"You're Cut Off"	February 18, 2016	Sal	0.81
The guys team up as employees at Unique Copy Center, do bizarre interviews with moviegoers, and stand up for ridiculous protests outside a Staten Island Ferry terminal. Punishment: At a major beer and wine event, Sal works as a vendor, and is forced to cut people off from drinking any more alcohol, or cut "all you can drink" bracelets off people's wrists so that they cannot drink anymore. It was later revealed in an "Inside Jokes" version of the episode that Sal himself came up with the idea in the first place and the Jokers decided to use it against him.
104	3	"Ruffled Feathers"	February 25, 2016	Sal	0.77
The guys showcase their inventions to a focus group, and get off on the wrong foot at a shoe store. Punishment: Sal is forced to give a presentation to zoo patrons, with Q chosen to "assist" him, all the while dealing with his fears of the animals attacking him.
105	4	"Stare Master"	March 3, 2016	Joe	0.87
The guys play copycat in the streets while babysitting kids who are being told what to say and do, then head to a supermarket to play an epic battle of catch and release. Punishment: Joe is forced to constantly stare at people working out in a gym until the others allow him to stop.
106	5	"Bidder Loser"	March 10, 2016	Q	0.65
The guys ask strangers to help them bury bizarre items in a park, go head-to-head to see who can cling to a car the longest, and play another game of "repeat after me". Punishment: Q is forced to go to an auction house to sell items that are not actually his personal belongings, and every time the auction is about to close on them, he has to change his mind about selling them and take them back. The last item is supposedly his personal tires and he must let them be sold, leaving his Jeep Wrangler with no tires.
107	6	"The Good, The Bad, and the Punished"	March 24, 2016	Q	0.88
The guys act as crabby NYC cab drivers and try to solicit undeserved congratulations from park goers. Punishment: Dressed as a sheriff, Q is forced to "arrest" outlaws in a Western setting.
108	7	"Putting the P in Pool"	March 31, 2016	Joe	0.85
The guys team up acting as crummy cashiers at a grocery store, head to the mall to play a touching game involving laser pointers, and confess to strangers at the park. Punishment: Joe is forced announce to everybody at a public swimming pool, that he is currently urinating in the pool.
109	8	"Statue of Limitations"	April 7, 2016	Sal	0.79
The guys act as inhospitable restaurant hosts and beg strangers to babysit their grandfathers. Punishment: In "Kill the Centaur", when Murr and Sal were playing a game of "Do it Better" in the park, Sal had taken the "nose" of a statue, and the Department of Homeland Security told Joe, Murr, and Q that they were not allowed to play on a national landmark again. However, they never told Sal, so for his punishment, he must sit face-to-face with an inspector of Homeland Security, explaining his behavior, while the other guys are telling the inspector what to say and do. Three weeks later, a group of representatives from the Department of Homeland Security go up to the jokers, while Sal thinks they are about to film a challenge, and pretend to shutdown the show for the summer. The jokers then reveal that it was all a setup, making this the longest punishment in the show's history.
110	9	"Brother of the Sisterhood"	April 14, 2016	Q	0.83
The guys encourage strangers to fill out their questionnaires with a broken hand in a waiting room, and then try to convince strangers into handing over a $5 bill for bizarre reasons at a grocery store. Punishment: Q is forced pose as a professional and award-winning women's rights blogger at a feminist event and to "respectfully disagree" with whatever statements are made.
111	10	"Dark Side of the Moon"	April 21, 2016	Murr	0.85
The guys go head-to-head making bizarre passes at a supermarket with shoppers and act as reporters asking ridiculous questions written by the other guys. Punishment: Murr is forced to volunteer for a free prostate exam in front of strangers at a health seminar. Right as he is seemingly done however, the doctor requests "a second opinion" thus giving Murr a secondary prostate exam.
112	11	"Whose Phone Is Ringing?"	April 28, 2016	Sal	0.68
The guys go face to face hitting the bulls-eye at a clothing store, and go head to head in a focus group sabotaging each other with strange inventions. Punishment: Sal is forced to pose as an author with a book at an authors' presentation while his phone continuously plays an annoying ringtone, to the audience's growing frustration. Eventually an annoyed patron confiscates his phone when Sal must let it ring without turning it off.
113	12	"Centaur of Attention"	May 5, 2016	Murr	0.75
The guys compete head to head answering questions in focus groups, spread much confusion while teaming up at a bagel shop, and pass ridiculous notes to strangers at the park. Punishment: Dressed in his centaur costume from the punishment in "Kill the Centaur", with deer antlers added, Murr is forced to survive a five-mile jog to his parents' house while the other Jokers are hunting for him.
114	13	"Browbeaten"	May 12, 2016	Murr	0.84
The guys try not to laugh at gag names as receptionists and try to get donations for bogus charities at a pizza restaurant. Punishment: Before their London trip to film "British Invasion", Murr is forced to have his eyebrows, his facial hair and his head shaved until completely bald except for a ring of hair around the top of his head, and then apply for a new driver's license (that will not expire until March 2026), looking the way he is, much to his displeasure.
115	14	"The Coward"	July 21, 2016	Sal	0.95
The guys show who's boss while working the counter at a fast food restaurant, and then whisper sweet nothings to strangers at Fairway Market. Punishment: Sal is forced to help a cow give birth at a farm.
116	15	"Virtual Insanity"	July 28, 2016	Sal	1.03
The guys team up to bark up the wrong tree at a pet store, team up to play a game of catch with groceries in a market, and go head-to-head trying to get strangers' signatures for ridiculous causes. Punishment: Sal is forced to be locked in a virtual reality room, and play a horror video game entitled Sisters while the crew secretly redecorates the room to resemble the setting of the game.
117	16	"Laundry Day"	August 4, 2016	Joe	1.02
The guys go head-to-head on the prowl for partners in crime at a supermarket, and then throw caution to the wind as helpless romantics in a park. Punishment: Joe is forced to be the one-man pep rally squad shooting T-shirts from a T-shirt cannon at a Philadelphia Soul arena football game in Wells Fargo Center. Unbeknownst to him, the prizes are outfits straight from his own wardrobe.
118	17	"Water Torture"	August 11, 2016	Sal	0.78
The guys complete challenges while spinning the "Wheel of Faces" in the Palisades Center mall, play another round of "Did I Deserve That?" in a coffee shop, and save strangers from being shot by a child wielding a water gun while saying something very awful to the stranger in a park. Punishment: Although initially meant to be the final challenge of the episode, the other guys turn Sal's growing annoyance with the child actors into a punishment where the child actors repeatedly mess up the bit in various ways.
119	18	"Hitting the Wrong Note"	August 18, 2016	Joe	0.83
The guys share sad stories in a park, hoping to get some sympathy back, then go head-to-head sharing new video game ideas in a focus group, then head to a floral shop going head-to-head to stump each other. Punishment: Joe is tricked into dishonoring a fake deceased boy's family at a (fake) memorial service held in Columbus Park, New York.
120	19	"Heckle and Hide"	August 25, 2016	Q	0.91
The guys ask strangers to hold a random object for them chosen by the other guys in a grocery store, then team-up and teach business seminars, controlled by the others. Punishment: Q is forced to pose as a little league dad watching the game, and do and say whatever he is told by the other guys.
121	20	"The Chairman"	September 15, 2016	Q	0.73
The guys do and say whatever they are told while barefoot at a department store, and start conversations with strangers using a single word in a park. Punishment: Q is forced to spend time in "The Death Chair", a remote controlled wheelchair with a bullhorn, a leaf blower and a confetti cannon attached to it, all completely controlled by the other guys.
122	21	"Wrapper's Delight"	September 22, 2016	Joe	0.69
The guys pose as waiters in a Hooters restaurant, try to get people in a mall to remember lyrics to a song, and go head-to-head invading people's personal space in a park. Punishment: Joe is forced to be sent on a small treasure hunt looking for clues. The final item that he finds is a paper that reads "you shouldn't have left your house." Upon returning to his house, Joe discovers that the entire interior has been covered in wrapping paper while he was gone, and his photos have been stolen by the other guys and replaced with inappropriate photos.
123	22	"Ash Clown"	October 6, 2016	Murr	0.80
The guys are at a sunglasses store doing and saying whatever the guys tell them to do. Then they go to a grocery store, going head-to-head posing as employees trying to get messages across through shoppers, and then get people on their side in a ridiculous protest. Punishment: At an elementary school "career day," Murr is forced to pose as an employee for his own company that he operates, which turns out to be a pet cremator/grandparents' divorce lawyer, and he has to explain his "career" to the uncomfortable audience.
124	23	"Spider Man"	October 13, 2016	Q	0.61
The guys do and say whatever they are told while at a buffet restaurant, team-up for construction presentations at a hardware store, and play a game of "repeat after me" with strangers in a park. Punishment: Q's fear of spiders is put to the test when he has several tarantulas placed on him while strapped down to a board.
125	24	"Stage Fright"	October 20, 2016	Q	0.62
The jokers team up to work at a pawn shop, try to give free hugs after incredibly bizarre apologies in a park, and then complete designated tasks while riding the Roosevelt Island Tramway. Punishment: Before becoming a comedian, Q was a firefighter of the FDNY. Q is forced to take part in an embarrassing musical in front of all his firefighter buddies.
126	25	"Training Day"	October 27, 2016	Joe, Murr and Sal	0.82
The guys interact with supermarket shoppers while wearing jingle bell vests, later they play another game of "Don't I Know You?" in a park, and pass bizarre notes to strangers in another park. Punishment: As revenge for the musical punishment Q went through in the previous episode ("Stage Fright"), he forces Joe, Sal, and Murr to go through the Fire Academy's training course in the fourth triple punishment, and the second time with Joe, Sal and Murr as the losers. Joe had to take an axe through one of two roof windows that were either pictures of his wife and dogs or his baby daughter. Murr had to scale down a building on a rappel while being confronted by Sloppy Joe (as revenge for Q's punishment in "Car Sick"), Fat Crow (from Q's punishment in "Out of Fashion"), and the doctor who gave Murr the prostate exam (from "Dark Side of the Moon") along the way. For Sal, he had to climb a fire engine ladder to rescue a stuffed toy cat from the roof of a six-story building, but he froze at the start due to fear. In the end, Q fire hosed down all three losing jokers until they respected him.
127	26	"Nitro Circus Spectacular"	November 3, 2016	Murr, then Sal	1.23
In this supersized two-hour episode, a Nitro Circus/X Games inspired obstacle course was presented and aside from clips of regular challenges filmed prior to this live special, viewers were shown clips of the Jokers preparing to run the course; the Joker who then ran the course the fastest won $100,000 for a charity of their choice. As Q was injured during the guys' training sessions with Travis Pastrana, he was not cleared by doctors to compete in the actual obstacle course and chose Joey Fatone to perform in his place again. Challenges included getting strangers to watch their apartment, a trip back to the Castle of White, and a spin on the Wheel of "Now!". Punishment: This episode featured two punishments - one for the losing joker after a regular episode's worth of challenges played and an automatic punishment for the joker who received the most votes from the public leading up to and during this episode. Murr lost the regular challenges and had to participate as an obstacle for professional jumpers to bike around and over on the Nitro Circus track. Sal, who got the most votes from the public, was hoisted into the air via harness and swung around for a bit. He was brought down to rest for a minute before being hoisted again and sent flying into a giant "cake". Despite the Punishments, Murr had the fastest time, and won $100,000 for his charity: Make a Wish Foundation.

Punishment Count:

- Sal - 10 (including joint punishments) Total now: 43
- Joe - 6 (including joint punishments) Total now: 29
- Murr - 7 (including joint punishments) Total now: 38
- Q - 7 (including joint punishments) Total now: 30
