= List of Impractical Jokers episodes =

Impractical Jokers is an American hidden camera-practical joke reality television series that premiered originally on truTV on December 15, 2011. It follows long time friends as well the members of the comedy troupe The Tenderloins as they coerce one another into doing public pranks on each other all of it while being filmed by hidden cameras.

As of September 3, 2026, 294 episodes & 46 specials have aired.

== Series overview ==
Season	Episodes	Originally released		
Season	Episodes	First released	Last released	Network
1	16	December 15, 2011	May 3, 2012	truTV
2	28	September 6, 2012	December 12, 2013	truTV
3	31	January 2, 2014	October 30, 2014	truTV
4	26	January 29, 2015	October 22, 2015	truTV
5	26	February 11, 2016	November 3, 2016	truTV
6	26	February 9, 2017	November 2, 2017	truTV
7	26	February 1, 2018	December 6, 2018	truTV
8	26	March 28, 2019	March 5, 2020	truTV
9	26	February 4, 2021	August 4, 2022	truTV
10	21	February 9, 2023	July 18, 2024	truTV/TBS
11	19	July 25, 2024	March 20, 2025	TBS
12	18	July 10, 2025	March 20, 2026	TBS
13	TBA	July 23, 2026	TBA	TBS
Specials	46	February 2, 2012	N/A	truTV/TBS

== Episodes ==
=== Season 1 (2011–12) ===
No. overall	No. in season	Title	Original air date	Losing Joker(s)	U.S. viewers (millions)
1	1	"Pay It Forward"	December 15, 2011	Sal	1.52
2	2	"Butterfly Crime Scene"	December 15, 2011	Sal	1.33
3	3	"Unmotivational Speaker"	December 22, 2011	Sal	1.50
4	4	"Boardwalk of Shame"	December 29, 2011	Joe	1.31
5	5	"Drawing a Blank"	January 5, 2012	Sal	1.48
6	6	"Panty Raid"	January 12, 2012	Murr	1.35
7	7	"Out of TP"	January 19, 2012	Joe	1.61
8	8	"Who Arted"	January 26, 2012	Q	1.70
9	9	"A Loser Presents"	February 16, 2012	Murr	1.62
10	10	"What Did I Eat?"	March 29, 2012	Q	1.27
11	11	"Starfart Macchiato"	March 29, 2012	Murr	1.27
12	12	"Bellydancer"	April 5, 2012	Joe	1.31
13	13	"Charity Case"	April 12, 2012	Murr	1.84
14	14	"Theater del Absurdo"	April 19, 2012	Joe	1.71
15	15	"Pick a Loser"	April 26, 2012	Q	1.12
16	16	"Supercuts"	May 3, 2012	All Jokers	1.51

=== Season 2 (2012–13) ===
No. overall	No. in season	Title	Original air date	Losing Joker(s)	U.S. viewers (millions)
17	1	"Elephant in the Room"	September 6, 2012	Sal	1.72
18	2	"The Stoop Sessions Part 1"	September 13, 2012	clip show	1.52
19	3	"Art Attack"	September 20, 2012	Murr	1.72
20	4	"The Stoop Sessions Part 2"	September 27, 2012	clip show	1.20
21	5	"Strip High Five"	December 13, 2012	Joe and Murr	1.69
22	6	"Birds and the Bees"	December 13, 2012	Q	1.87
23	7	"Sound EffeXXX"	December 20, 2012	Sal	1.56
24	8	"Do Something To My Face"	December 27, 2012	Joe	1.97
25	9	"Psychotic Not-Line"	January 3, 2013	Sal	2.01
26	10	"The Truth Hurts"	January 10, 2013	Murr	1.75
27	11	"Get Out of Dodge"	January 17, 2013	Murr	1.69
28	12	"The Love Expert"	January 24, 2013	Joe	1.81
29	13	"Out of Fashion"	February 7, 2013	Q	2.08
30	14	"Scaredy Cat"	February 14, 2013	Sal	1.68
31	15	"Joker vs. Joker"	February 21, 2013	Q and Sal	1.93
32	16	"Down in the Dump"	August 1, 2013	Sal	1.64
33	17	"Human Piñata"	August 8, 2013	Murr	1.49
34	18	"Sweat the Small Things"	August 15, 2013	Sal	1.61
35	19	"Film Fail"	August 22, 2013	Q	1.29
36	20	"Not Safe For Work"	August 29, 2013	Murr	1.34
37	21	"The Alliance"	September 5, 2013	Joe, Murr and Sal	1.41
38	22	"Everything's Just Rosie"	September 12, 2013	Q	1.28
39	23	"Enter the Dragons"	October 24, 2013	Joe and Sal	1.08
40	24	"Dog Days of Bummer"	October 31, 2013	Joe	1.17
41	25	"Sorry for Your Loss"	November 7, 2013	Sal	1.23
42	26	"All the Wrong Moves"	November 14, 2013	Q	1.48
43	27	"Cyber Buddies"	December 5, 2013	Murr	1.05
44	28	"Trouble Shoot"	December 12, 2013	Q	1.00

=== Season 3 (2014) ===
No. overall	No. in season	Title	Original air date	Losing Joker(s)	U.S. viewers (millions)
45	1	"Look Out Below"	January 2, 2014	Murr	1.37
46	2	"The Great Escape"	January 9, 2014	Joe	1.56
47	3	"Field of Screams"	January 16, 2014	Sal	1.42
48	4	"Nationals Disaster"	January 23, 2014	Joe	1.90
49	5	"Bonus Footage"	January 30, 2014	clip show	1.25
50	6	"Toasted"	February 6, 2014	Sal	1.39
51	7	"Scarytales"	February 13, 2014	Q	1.24
52	8	"Inside the Vault"	February 20, 2014	clip show	1.15
53	9	"Bigger in Texas"	March 27, 2014	Q	1.48
54	10	"Snow Way Out"	April 1, 2014	Murr and Sal	1.09
55	11	"Takes the Cake"	April 10, 2014	Joe	1.07
56	12	"Anniversary Edition"	April 17, 2014	clip show	1.10
57	13	"Jokers Playhouse"	May 15, 2014	Murr	1.10
58	14	"Make Womb for Daddy"	May 22, 2014	Q	1.22
59	15	"Puncture Perfect"	May 29, 2014	Murr	1.24
60	16	"Junk in the Trunk"	June 12, 2014	Sal	1.31
61	17	"The Good, the Bad, and the Uncomfortable"	June 19, 2014	clip show	0.96
62	18	"Baggage Shame"	June 24, 2014	Joe	1.26
63	19	"Quantum Mock-anics"	July 10, 2014	Joe	1.15
64	20	"Clash of the Jokers"	July 17, 2014	Murr, Sal and Q	0.78
65	21	"Tooth & Consequences"	July 24, 2014	Murr	1.21
66	22	"Fe-Mail"	July 31, 2014	Joe	1.05
67	23	"The Lost Boy"	August 7, 2014	Q	1.08
68	24	"Up Loser's Creek"	August 14, 2014	Sal	0.96
69	25	"In Poor Taste Buds"	September 25, 2014	Murr	0.88
70	26	"The Permanent Punishment"	October 2, 2014	Murr, Sal and Q	1.01
71	27	"Parks and Wreck"	October 9, 2014	Sal	0.71
72	28	"A Legendary Fail"	October 16, 2014	Murr	0.96
73	29	"B-I-N-G-NO"	October 23, 2014	Sal	1.14
74	30	"Just Say No"	October 28, 2014	Q	0.98
75	31	"Brother-in-Loss"	October 30, 2014	Sal	0.92

=== Season 4 (2015) ===
No. overall	No. in season	Title	Original air date	Losing Joker(s)	U.S. viewers (millions)
76	1	"Welcome to Miami"	January 29, 2015	Q	1.23
77	2	"Below the Belt"	February 5, 2015	Murr	1.00
78	3	"Uncool and the Gang"	February 12, 2015	Joe	0.95
79	4	"Wrong Playwright"	February 19, 2015	Q	1.09
80	5	"Elevating The Game"	February 26, 2015	Sal	1.14
81	6	"The Blunder Years"	March 5, 2015	Murr	1.23
82	7	"Deal With The Devils"	March 12, 2015	Sal and Q	1.02
83	8	"Damned If You Do"	March 26, 2015	Murr	0.98
84	9	"The Dream Crusher"	April 2, 2015	Sal	0.93
85	10	"Joke & Dagger"	April 9, 2015	Murr	0.95
86	11	"Pseudo-Sumo"	April 16, 2015	Joe	1.09
87	12	"Car Sick"	April 23, 2015	Q	1.05
88	13	"Cruisin' For A Bruisin'"	May 7, 2015	Murr, then Joe	1.08
89	14	"Bathroom Break"	July 16, 2015	Sal	1.33
90	15	"Kill the Centaur"	July 23, 2015	Murr	1.01
91	16	"Captain Fatbelly"	July 30, 2015	Joe	0.93
92	17	"Sneaking Number Twos, Going Number One"	August 6, 2015	Sal	0.88
93	18	"Blind Justice"	August 13, 2015	Sal	0.92
94	19	"Tied and Feathered"	August 20, 2015	Murr	0.96
95	20	"Smushed"	August 27, 2015	Q	0.98
96	21	"Live Punishment Special"	September 3, 2015	Joe	1.74
97	22	"The Big Uneasy"	September 10, 2015	Sal	0.58
98	23	"Hopeless and Changeless"	September 24, 2015	Murr	0.70
99	24	"Stripped of Dignity"	October 8, 2015	Joe	0.87
100	25	"The Taunted House"	October 15, 2015	Sal	0.98
101	26	"Doomed"	October 22, 2015	Murr	0.71

=== Season 5 (2016) ===
No. overall	No. in season	Title	Original air date	Losing Joker(s)	U.S. viewers (millions)
102	1	"HellCopter"	February 11, 2016	Murr and Sal	1.04
103	2	"You're Cut Off"	February 18, 2016	Sal	0.81
104	3	"Ruffled Feathers"	February 25, 2016	Sal	0.77
105	4	"Stare Master"	March 3, 2016	Joe	0.87
106	5	"Bidder Loser"	March 10, 2016	Q	0.65
107	6	"The Good, The Bad, and the Punished"	March 24, 2016	Q	0.88
108	7	"Putting the P in Pool"	March 31, 2016	Joe	0.85
109	8	"Statue of Limitations"	April 7, 2016	Sal	0.79
110	9	"Brother of the Sisterhood"	April 14, 2016	Q	0.83
111	10	"Dark Side of the Moon"	April 21, 2016	Murr	0.85
112	11	"Whose Phone Is Ringing?"	April 28, 2016	Sal	0.68
113	12	"Centaur of Attention"	May 5, 2016	Murr	0.75
114	13	"Browbeaten"	May 12, 2016	Murr	0.84
115	14	"The Coward"	July 21, 2016	Sal	0.95
116	15	"Virtual Insanity"	July 28, 2016	Sal	1.03
117	16	"Laundry Day"	August 4, 2016	Joe	1.02
118	17	"Water Torture"	August 11, 2016	Sal	0.78
119	18	"Hitting the Wrong Note"	August 18, 2016	Joe	0.83
120	19	"Heckle and Hide"	August 25, 2016	Q	0.91
121	20	"The Chairman"	September 15, 2016	Q	0.73
122	21	"Wrapper's Delight"	September 22, 2016	Joe	0.69
123	22	"Ash Clown"	October 6, 2016	Murr	0.80
124	23	"Spider Man"	October 13, 2016	Q	0.61
125	24	"Stage Fright"	October 20, 2016	Q	0.62
126	25	"Training Day"	October 27, 2016	Joe, Murr and Sal	0.82
127	26	"Nitro Circus Spectacular"	November 3, 2016	Murr, then Sal	1.23

=== Season 6 (2017) ===
No. overall	No. in season	Title	Original air date	Losing Joker(s)	U.S. viewers (millions)
128	1	"Swim Shady"	February 9, 2017	Sal	0.97
129	2	"Lady and the Tramp"	February 16, 2017	Murr	0.83
130	3	"The Parent Trap"	February 23, 2017	Joe	0.76
131	4	"Catastrophe"	March 2, 2017	Sal	0.82
132	5	"Vampire Weakened"	March 9, 2017	Murr	0.85
133	6	"Footloose"	March 23, 2017	Sal	0.84
134	7	"X Man"	March 30, 2017	Q	0.75
135	8	"Medium, Well Done"	April 6, 2017	Sal	1.04
136	9	"Drum and Drummer"	April 13, 2017	Q and Joe	0.77
137	10	"The Butt of the Joker"	April 20, 2017	Murr	0.88
138	11	"Stuffed Turkey"	April 27, 2017	Q	0.78
139	12	"Crickets"	May 4, 2017	Sal	0.71
140	13	"Universal Appeal"	May 11, 2017	Q	0.94
141	14	"Paradise Lost"	July 13, 2017	Murr	1.17
142	15	"Mime and Punishment"	July 20, 2017	Q	0.94
143	16	"Three Men and Your Baby"	July 27, 2017	Q, Murr and Sal	0.83
144	17	"The Q-Pay"	August 3, 2017	Murr	1.02
145	18	"Rubbed the Wrong Way"	August 10, 2017	Joe	0.96
146	19	"Flatfoot the Pirate"	August 17, 2017	Sal	0.91
147	20	"Remember the Pact"	August 24, 2017	Murr	0.96
148	21	"Silence of the Lame"	August 31, 2017	Sal	0.92
149	22	"The Walking Dread"	September 14, 2017	Sal	0.83
150	23	"Take Me Out at The Ball Game"	September 28, 2017	Joe	1.00
151	24	"The Party Crasher"	October 5, 2017	Murr	0.74
152	25	"Dover and Out"	October 12, 2017	Q	0.77
153	26	"G.I. Jokers"	November 2, 2017	Murr, then Q	0.87

=== Season 7 (2018) ===
No. overall	No. in season	Title	Original air date	Losing Joker(s)	U.S. viewers (millions)
154	1	"The Marathon Man"	February 1, 2018	Murr	0.89
155	2	"Guilty as Charged"	February 8, 2018	Q	0.65
156	3	"No Good Deed"	February 15, 2018	Joe and Sal	0.63
157	4	"Stripteased"	March 1, 2018	Murr	0.68
158	5	"Indecent Proposal"	March 22, 2018	Sal	0.69
159	6	"Turning the Tables"	March 29, 2018	Joe	0.66
160	7	"Lords of the Ring"	April 12, 2018	Sal and Q	0.65
161	8	"No Child Left Behind"	April 26, 2018	Q	0.55
162	9	"Pulling the Rug"	May 10, 2018	Murr	0.65
163	10	"Speech Impediment"	August 2, 2018	Murr	0.83
164	11	"Card Against Humanity"	August 9, 2018	Sal	0.76
165	12	"Bull Shiatsu"	August 16, 2018	Joe	0.59
166	13	"The Running Of The Bullies"	August 23, 2018	Sal	0.75
167	14	"The Needy and the Greedy"	August 30, 2018	Q	0.76
168	15	"Washed Up"	September 13, 2018	Joe	0.64
169	16	"To Hatch A Predator"	September 20, 2018	Q	0.51
170	17	"Like A Boss"	September 27, 2018	Murr	0.54
171	18	"Chick Magnet"	October 4, 2018	Sal	0.65
172	19	"Dropping Knowledge"	October 11, 2018	Murr	0.52
173	20	"Hump Day"	October 18, 2018	Q	0.48
174	21	"Out of Left Field"	October 25, 2018	Joe	0.45
175	22	"Autograph Corrector"	November 1, 2018	Q	0.50
176	23	"The Bogey Man"	November 8, 2018	Sal	0.54
177	24	"Hell On Wheels"	November 15, 2018	Murr	0.56
178	25	"Pantsing With the Stars"	November 29, 2018	Sal	0.50
179	26	"Staten Island Holiday Spectacular"	December 6, 2018	Sal	0.57

=== Season 8 (2019–20) ===
No. overall	No. in season	Title	Original air date	Losing Joker(s)	U.S. viewers (millions)
180	1	"Crash Test Dummies"	March 28, 2019	Murr and Sal	0.58
181	2	"The Closer"	April 4, 2019	Murr	0.50
182	3	"Tipping Point"	April 11, 2019	Sal	0.56
183	4	"Full Mental Jacket"	April 18, 2019	Joe	0.54
184	5	"Blue Man Dupe"	April 25, 2019	Q	0.49
185	6	"The Dumbbell"	May 2, 2019	Murr	0.51
186	7	"The Eggman"	May 9, 2019	Joe	0.56
187	8	"Cake Loss"	May 23, 2019	Q	0.59
188	9	"The Antisocial Network"	May 30, 2019	Q	0.56
189	10	"Off the Reservation"	August 8, 2019	Sal	0.51
190	11	"Fraudway"	August 15, 2019	Murr	0.47
191	12	"The Show Stopper"	August 22, 2019	Q	0.55
192	13	"Sucks for You"	August 29, 2019	Murr	0.48
193	14	"Well..."	September 12, 2019	Sal	0.54
194	15	"The Prize Fighter"	September 19, 2019	Murr	0.36
195	16	"Sun-Fan Lotion"	September 26, 2019	Joe	0.36
196	17	"Urine Trouble"	October 3, 2019	Sal	0.46
197	18	"Irritable Vowel Syndrome"	October 10, 2019	Q	0.38
198	19	"Bad Carma"	October 17, 2019	Q	0.44
199	20	"Fast Feud"	October 24, 2019	Sal	0.39
200	21	"Toll Booth Corrector"	January 30, 2020	Murr	0.57
201	22	"The Paternity Test"	February 6, 2020	Joe	0.63
202	23	"Hollywood"	February 13, 2020	Murr	0.71
203	24	"The Shame of Water"	February 20, 2020	Sal	0.54
204	25	"Rock Bottom"	February 27, 2020	Joe	0.50
205	26	"It's Electric"	March 5, 2020	Murr	0.54

=== Season 9 (2021–22) ===
No. overall	No. in season	Title	Original air date	Losing Joker(s)	U.S. viewers (millions)
206	1	"You Dirty Dog"	February 4, 2021	Joe	0.60
207	2	"The Bachelor Party"	February 11, 2021	Murr	0.47
208	3	"Drive, Drive, Drive"	February 18, 2021	Q	0.47
209	4	"Poetry Slammed"	February 25, 2021	Sal	0.52
210	5	"Bleach for America"	March 4, 2021	Murr	0.57
211	6	"Smashing Success"	March 11, 2021	Sal	0.56
212	7	"Pity in Pink"	March 25, 2021	Murr	0.48
213	8	"Space Oddity"	April 15, 2021	Murr	0.48
214	9	"OK Zoomer"	April 22, 2021	Joe	0.54
215	10	"The Prince and Me"	April 29, 2021	Prince Herb (Sal)	0.34
216	11	"Breaking Wind Beneath My Wings"	July 8, 2021	Joe	0.41
217	12	"Prince + Charming"	July 15, 2021	Murr	TBA
218	13	"I’m Having The Best Time"	July 22, 2021	Murr	0.46
219	14	"Documentary No!"	July 29, 2021	Q and Prince Herb (Sal)	TBA
220	15	"Food, Air, Toilet"	August 5, 2021	Prince Herb (Sal)	TBA
221	16	"A Tasteful Episode"	August 12, 2021	Joe	0.43
222	17	"Moist Richard"	August 19, 2021	Q	0.42
223	18	"Eric André"	April 2, 2022	Sal	0.21 (Note: Impractical Jokers showed up 3 times on the Saturday cable ratings for TruTV only. The original broadcast at 4pm was given a 0.144, the 11:30pm rerun was given a .211, and the 1:30am rerun was given a 0.177.)
224	19	"Jillian Bell"	June 16, 2022	Sal	0.17
225	20	"Colin Jost"	June 23, 2022	Q	0.28
226	21	"Rob Riggle"	June 30, 2022	Murr	0.38
227	22	"Chris Jericho"	July 7, 2022	Q	0.33
228	23	"Adam Pally & Jon Gabrus"	July 14, 2022	Sal	0.29
229	24	"David Cross"	July 21, 2022	Murr	0.20
230	25	"Method Man"	July 28, 2022	Murr	0.27
231	26	"Brooke Shields"	August 4, 2022	Sal	0.27

=== Season 10 (2023–24) ===
No. overall	No. in season	Title	Original air date	Losing Joker(s)	Viewers (millions) (TBS/Tru)
232	1	"Bret Michaels"	February 9, 2023	Murr	0.37 / 0.17
233	2	"Post Malone"	February 16, 2023	Q	0.42 / 0.22
234	3	"Anthony Davis"	February 23, 2023	Sal	0.49 / 0.21
235	4	"John Mayer"	March 2, 2023	Murr	0.38 / 0.18
236	5	"Kesha"	March 9, 2023	Sal	0.40 / 0.19
237	6	"Sideline Smack Talk"	March 19, 2023	clip show	0.47 (TruTV)
238	7	"Paul Scheer"	March 30, 2023	Sal & Murr	0.33 / 0.20
239	8	"Kal Penn"	April 6, 2023	Sal	0.42 / 0.15
240	9	"Bruce Campbell"	April 13, 2023	Q	0.41 / 0.16
241	10	"Blake Anderson"	April 27, 2023	Sal	0.19 (TruTV)
242	11	"Bobby Moynihan"	February 8, 2024	Murr	N/A (Note: On June 30, 2023, Showbuzz Daily announced that network TV ratings were no longer being publicized.)
243	12	"Kim Fields"	February 15, 2024	Q	N/A
244	13	"Paula Abdul"	February 22, 2024	Sal	N/A
245	14	"Eric André Returns"	February 29, 2024	Sal	N/A
246	15	"ALF"	March 7, 2024	Q	N/A
247	16	"Michael Ian Black"	March 7, 2024	Sal	N/A
248	17	"Harvey Guillen"	April 6, 2024	Q	N/A
249	18	"Joey Fatone"	July 11, 2024	Joey Fatone	TBA
250	19	"Roy Wood Jr."	July 18, 2024	Murr	TBA
251	20	"Outtakes and Chill"	August 1, 2024	clip show	TBA
252	21	"Servin' Up Laughs"	August 29, 2024	clip show	TBA

=== Season 11 (2024–25) ===
No. overall	No. in season	Title	Original air date	Losing Joker(s)	U.S. viewers (millions)
253	1	"Tournament of Losers"	July 25, 2024	Murr	TBA
254	2	"Cell Block"	August 1, 2024	Murr	TBA
255	3	"Bowling for Dollars"	August 8, 2024	Sal	TBA
256	4	"The Planetarium Prowler"	August 15, 2024	Q	TBA
257	5	"Check Yourself"	August 22, 2024	Murr	TBA
258	6	"The F Bomber"	August 29, 2024	Sal	TBA
259	7	"Personal Be-Wrongings"	September 12, 2024	Q	TBA
260	8	"Shake What Daddy Gave Ya"	September 19, 2024	Sal	TBA
261	9	"One for the Books"	September 26, 2024	Sal	TBA
262	10	"Bad News Bares"	January 9, 2025	Sal	TBA
263	11	"When You Gotta Go"	January 16, 2025	Murr	TBA
264	12	"Cross the Line"	January 23, 2025	Sal	TBA
265	13	"Bullion Beggar"	January 30, 2025	Q	0.29
264	14	"Hung In There"	February 6, 2025	Murr	0.22
265	15	"Thanks for Nothing"	February 13, 2025	Sal	0.28
266	16	"Lactose Intolerables"	February 27, 2025	Murr and Q	TBA
267	17	"Recut Gems"	March 6, 2025	clip show	TBA
268	18	"Off The Wheels"	March 13, 2025	Murr	TBA
269	19	"Trolling For Friends"	March 29, 2025	Murr	TBA

=== Season 12 (2025–26) ===
No. overall	No. in season	Title	Original air date	Losing Joker(s)	U.S. viewers (millions)
270	1	"The Endless Esophagus"	July 10, 2025	Sal	0.287
271	2	"Call of the Wild"	July 17, 2025	Q	0.321
272	3	"Facial Awareness"	July 24, 2025	Murr	0.317
273	4	"Customer Disservice"	July 31, 2025	Sal	0.305
274	5	"Rage Baiter"	August 7, 2025	Q	0.336
275	6	"Mind, Body, Swole"	August 14, 2025	Sal	0.375
276	7	"Meat Cute"	August 21, 2025	Murr	0.243
277	8	"Dopamine Denier"	August 28, 2025	Sal	0.217
278	9	"Hoop! There It Is!"	September 4, 2025	Murr	0.227
279	10	"Haunting of the Joker House"	January 15, 2026	Sal	TBA
280	11	"Revenge of the Joker"	January 22, 2026	Q and Sal	TBA
281	12	"Vac Attack"	January 29, 2026	Murr	TBA
282	13	"Subscribe to Survive"	February 5, 2026	Q	TBA
283	14	"Me, My Selfie, and Eye"	February 19, 2026	Sal	TBA
284	15	"The Founding Joker"	February 26, 2026	Murr	TBA
285	16	"A Tight Spot"	March 5, 2026	Sal	TBA
286	17	"Let's Get Crackin'"	March 19, 2026	Murr	TBA
287	18	"Happily Never After"	March 20, 2026	Murr	TBA

=== Season 13 (2026–present) ===
No. overall	No. in season	Title	Original air date	Losing Joker(s)	U.S. viewers (millions)
288	1	"Meal, Interrupted"	July 23, 2026	Murr	TBA
289	2	"Lean, Mean, Time Machine"	July 30, 2026	Q	TBA
290	3	"Celebrity Crushed"	August 6, 2026	Sal	TBA
291	4	"Valet Villain"	August 13, 2026	Murr	TBA
292	5	"Last Action Zero"	August 20, 2026	Sal	TBA
293	6	"A Ruff Day At The Park"	August 27, 2026	Sal	TBA
294	7	"Guest of Dishonor"	September 3, 2026	Sal	TBA

== Specials ==
No.	Title	Original release date	U.S. viewers (millions)
1	"Joker's Choice"	February 2, 2012	1.30
The guys go over their favorite challenges from the first season and tell each other personal thoughts.
2	"Inside Jokes"	May 8, 2014	N/A
In this one-hour special, there are repeats of "Look Out Below" and "Strip High Five", but with special trivia displayed on the screen.
3	"Happy Father's Day!"	June 15, 2014	0.77
The Jokers and their fathers show some classic scenes in a Father's Day episode.: This episode has a dedication at the end, in honor of Joseph S. Gatto, Joe's late father: 1939–95.
4	"Practically Live"	March 26, 2015	0.98
In this one-hour special, the Jokers offer a special behind-the-scenes look at their stand-up tour and personal lives.
5	"Funny 'Cause It Hurts"	April 30, 2015	0.75
In this special episode, the guys look back at the series' best punishments, plus share new secrets and show some never before seen footage.
6	"Anatomy of a Challenge"	August 31, 2015	0.82
In this special, the Jokers break down how to succeed in each challenge and how to make each other trip up and lose.
7	"Unseen Scenes"	September 1, 2015	0.56
In this special episode, the guys show more never before seen footage... or in this case, "unseen scenes".
8	"Fan-tastic Countdown"	September 2, 2015	0.90
The Jokers count down the most memorable moments of the show, according to their fans. 10. Q speaking olde English at the "Castle of White" ("Pay it Forward"): 9. Murr jumping on the couches with the over excited roommate ("Drawing a Blank"); 8. Sal doing the "Double Dutch" ("Do Something to my Face"); 7. Joe freaking out while teaching CPR ("Bellydancer"); 6. Q putting whipped cream on the shopping cart ("Nationals Disaster"); 5. Sal chanting "let's get sexy" in the baseball stadium ("Charity Case"); 4. Q's encounter with the "what does that mean" guy ("Psychotic Not-Line"); 3. Joe singing "scoopski potatoes" ("Everything's Just Rosie); 2. Murr's skydive ("Look Out Below"); 1. All of Joe's various "Larry" moments
9	"One Night Stand Up"	October 1, 2015	0.61
Joe, Murr, Sal, and Q hit the stage for their sold out stand-up show in Torrington, Connecticut, in this 90-minute televised special. Included are never before seen footage and exclusive behind-the-scenes footage.
10	"Joker Bowl: The Pros Weigh In"	February 4, 2016	0.61
Casey Jost joins NFL players Bart Scott and Shane Vereen to give in-depth analysis of each Joker's strategy and execution as well as statistical analysis and review of game-day footage.
11	"NCAA March Madness Showdown"	March 13, 2016	0.65
Going head-to-head, the Jokers compete for the championship title in a Sweet Sixteen bracket from four divisions: Grocery Store, Mall, Park and Posing as Employees. Winner: Q
12	"All Aboard"	May 19, 2016	0.74
The Impractical Jokers show highlights and unseen clips and play games with the fans on their latest cruise that set sail early this year.
13	"British Invasion"	July 14, 2016	1.15
In this one-hour episode, the Jokers wreak havoc across the city of London. The guys serve up pints of awkwardness at a pub, try to sell ridiculous theatre tickets in the West End, team up to work at a fish and chips shop, and use their infamous bullhorns that are controlled by the other guys. Losing Jokers: Joe and Murr Punishment: For the 8th double punishment, the jokers travel to High Wycombe in Buckinghamshire, where Joe and Murr are forced to become goalies at a soccer (or football) game, though they're actually merely target practice for professional soccer players Wycombe Wanderers F.C. This was Sal and Q's revenge for the last double punishment they faced in "Deal with the Devils".
14	"One Night at the Grand"	September 1, 2016	0.56
In this 90-minute special, the Jokers have their usual shenanigans at the Grand Opera House in Wilmington, DE. This episode is similar to "One Night Stand Up".
15	"Fantastic Access"	September 8, 2016	0.67
The Jokers answer questions from the fans by showing never before seen footage.
16	"A Day in the Life"	October 31, 2016	0.49
In this special, a documentary crew gets a behind-the-scenes look at the making of Impractical Jokers. Subjects mentioned include how to place the cameras, the crew's favorite moments and what happens when someone recognizes the Jokers.
17	"NCAA March Madness Bracket Attack"	March 12, 2017	0.52
Going head-to-head, the Jokers compete for the championship title in a Sweet 16 bracket, this time using punishments. Winner: Sal
18	"After Party"	May 11, 2017	0.64
Q, Murr, and host Joey Fatone take a behind-the-scenes look at the one-hour episode "Universal Appeal".
19	"The Murray Jury"	October 26, 2017	0.69
20	"Sizing up Sal"	October 26, 2017	0.64
21	"Judging Joe"	October 26, 2017	0.62
22	"Critiquing Q"	October 26, 2017	0.58
23	"Punishment Countdown"	November 2, 2017	0.63
Joey Fatone counts down his favorable punishments.
24	"Humiliation for the Holidays"	November 24, 2017	0.44
The guys revisit wild moments, sharing their favorite toys and spending time at the mall. Included are never before seen footage.
25	"The Joker Games"	February 22, 2018	0.54
Guest host Joey Fatone, along with special guest judges Kayla Harrison and Soren Thompson, determine who is the best all-around joker. 1st / Gold: Murr; 2nd / Silver: Sal; 3rd / Bronze: Q Last / 4th: Joe
26	"NCAA March Madness Breakdown"	March 8, 2018	0.54
Guest host by Joey Fatone, along with NBA players Doug McDermott and Enes Kanter, decide which Joker would be their #1 pick. Winners: Doug chooses Joe, while Enes chooses Q.
27	"Spring Break Countdown"	April 5, 2018	0.52
The guys count down their most cringeworthy and hilarious moments of fun in the sun. During the episode, a dozen totally ridiculous spring break tips are given.
28	"Joker for a Day"	May 3, 2018	0.65
The Jokers make members of the Impractical Jokers crew play the grocery store challenges they usually play, such as putting balloons, post-its and pencils on people without getting caught, looking for their wives, and so on. Whoever the Jokers declare the MVP gets a week off of work, with pay. MVP: Christine Morris (Art Director)
29	"Hits, Errors, and Balls!"	October 4, 2018	0.48
A countdown of baseball related clips from the show. 9) Q v. Murr pitching Baseball Mascot Ideas ("Clash of the Jokers") 8) Q's 'Just Say No' Punishment 7) Q v. Sal in Miss and a Swing ("Joker vs Joker") 6) Stadium Security Challenge ("A Legendary Fail") 5) Q's Breakdance Punishment ("All The Wrong Moves") 4) "Butterfly Crime Scene" ("Butterfly Crime Scene") 3) Q's Heckle and Hide Punishment ("Heckle and Hide") 2) Joe's punishment at Citi Field ("Take Me Out of the Ballgame") 1) Sal Chanting "Let's Get Sexy" ("Charity Case")
30	"Holiday Party"	December 6, 2018	TBA
A half-hour special featuring the guys looking back on the seventh season's funniest unaired moments.
31	"Fantasy Draft"	March 14, 2019	0.29
Joey Fatone joins NBA players Mo Bamba and Terrence Ross to create the perfect Impractical Jokers franchise.
32	"Summer Vacation"	May 16, 2019	0.38
A clip show of past episodes explaining the do's and don'ts of summer vacation.
33	"Joker for a Day Part 2"	October 31, 2019	0.37
The jokers surprise the crew yet again by having them compete in their favorite focus group related challenges such as reading off texts, showcasing products, finding out who's the weakest link, and doing and saying what the jokers tell them to do in a focus group waiting room. Like Part 1, the crew member who does best is voted MVP and gets a week off... with pay. MVP: Nicole Salamak (Production Manager)
34	"Celebrating 200 Episodes: The First Hundred"	February 13, 2020	0.58
The Guys review their best moments from the first four seasons of the show
35	"Celebrating 200 Episodes: The Second Hundred"	February 13, 2020	0.60
The Guys review their best moments of seasons 5-8
36	"Slam Dunks"	March 12, 2020	0.45
Casey Jost joins former NBA players Channing Frye and Richard Jefferson to discuss how gutsy the Jokers are by ranking them with 3 different categories on a 0-10 scale: Fast break, pump fakes, and hard in the paint. Winner: Joe 2nd: Sal 3rd: Murr 4th: Q
37	"Twists and Turns"	April 1, 2021	0.44
Highlights of some of the Jokers' top punishments where there was a "Well..." plot twist in the situation.
38	"Highlights from the High Seas"	April 8, 2021	0.31
The Jokers show off some of the activities and highlights of one of their theme cruises; and present a top ten clip show of travel moments. 10) Q's Rodeo Punishment ("Bigger in Texas"); 9) Keeping it Wheel' Challenge ("Welcome to Miami"); 8) Joe's Belly Flop Punishment ("Cruisin For a Bruisin"); 7) Murr's Surprise ("Cruisin For a Bruisin"); 6) Lonely Herb ("Welcome to Miami"); 5) Hungry Mermaid ("Welcome to Miami"); 4) Q' Old West Punishment ("The Good, The Bad, The Punished"); 3) Hawaiian Harmony ("Paradise Lost"); 2) Bog Monster of Louisiana ("The Big Uneasy") 1) Q's Tram Punishment ("The Show Stopper")
39	"Impractical Jokers Awards Show"	July 1, 2021	TBA
The guys host their own awards show and hand out 'Emmer" trophies presented by members of the Impractical Jokers' crew Best Challenge: Two-Way Mirror (multiple episodes) Best Kiss: Murr Marries Sal's Sister ("Brother-in-Loss") Best Contraption: The Car from Hell ("Drive, Drive, Drive") Best Stunt: Joe-I'm the Manager ("Turning the Tables") Best Costume: Sal-Bog Monster ("The Big Uneasy") Best Live Performance: Murr-Thunder from Down Under ("Stripteased") Best Supporting Animal: Pepe the Camel ("Hump Day") Best Workout: Joe-Gymnastics ("Nationals Disaster") Best Punishment: Sal, Murr, and Q-Tattoos ("The Permanent Punishment")
40	"Filming with the Stars"	August 11, 2022	TBA
41	"Servin' Up Laughs"	August 24, 2024	TBA
42	"Let It Roll"	September 5, 2024	TBA
The Jokers review some bonus clips while pretending to shoot a challenge in the mall where they attempt to get ahold of strangers' children.
43	"Couple's Therapy"	September 25, 2024	TBA
Q puts Sal and Murr in Couples Therapy, where Casey Jost shows clips of previous episodes.
44	"Behind Closed Doors"	September 11, 2025	0.224
In order to escape the locked supply room, the Jokers debate on who has the worst kind of punishment. The most painful punishments went to Murr while Q got the most embrassing punishments and Sal ended up with the most personal punishments. But they all agree that Joey Fatone's dance party punishment is the worst due to a mixture of past punishments.
45	"Cold Hard FAQs"	February 12, 2026	TBA
Sal, Q, and Murr are sick of hearing the same frequently asked questions about Impractical Jokers, so tonight they're sitting down and answering them once and for all.
46	"Leftovers"	March 12, 2026	TBA
Murr's got all of this leftover food that needs eating, and -- even more important -- a whole bunch of leftover clips from this season that didn't make the cut. Sal and Q help to polish them off, reminiscing on some favorite moments from Season 12.

== Removed episodes ==
Following Joe Gatto's departure from the show in December 2021, eight episodes of the show were pulled from broadcast, with only one of these episodes still available on HBO Max in the United States.

Since 2022, two additional episodes have been pulled from broadcast, two other episodes have been pulled from Hulu and one episode resumed airing in reruns on TruTV. While most of these episodes can be purchased on Amazon Prime Video, they cannot be individually purchased and are only sold through their respective full seasons. "Psychic Not-line", "Human Pinata" from Season 2, "Kill the Centaur" from Season 4 and "Footlose" from Season 6 are still available for individual purchase on Amazon Prime Video.

The following episodes are both banned from reruns on truTV and removed from streaming on Max and Hulu (unless noted otherwise):

- "Pick a Loser" (Season 1, Episode 16) (Note: This episode is still available for purchase on Amazon Prime Video)
- "The Love Expert" (Season 2, Episode 12)
- "Cyber Buddies" (Season 2, Episode 27)
- "Look Out Below" (Season 3, Episode 1)
- "The Dream Crusher" (Season 4, Episode 9)
- "Kill the Centaur" (Season 4, Episode 15) (Note: This is one of three episodes pulled from reruns, but not streaming. This episode is still available for purchase on Amazon Prime Video and streaming on Max and Hulu)
- "Stripped of Dignity" (Season 4, Episode 24)
- "Footlose" (Season 6, Episode 6) (Note: This is one of three episodes pulled from reruns, but not streaming. This appears to be the only episode pulled due to TruTV's Standards and Practices as opposed to featuring Joe in "compromising situations". This episode is still available for purchase on Amazon Prime Video and streaming on Hulu)
- "Bull Shiatsu" (Season 7, Episode 12)
- "Sun-Fan Lotion" (Season 8, Episode 16) (Note: This episode is still available for purchase on Amazon Prime Video. The Inside Jokes version remained available through select on demand providers until 2024)
- "Rock Bottom" (Season 8, Episode 25) (Note: This episode is still available for purchase on Amazon Prime Video. A partially edited cut of this episode appeared on Max on June 14th, 2023. This edit censors more of the faces and removes a line implying one of the women in the audience has an STI during Joe's punishment. It was later delisted from Max on an unknown date for unknown reasons)
- "You Dirty Dog" (Season 9, Episode 1) (Note: This episode was available on select on demand providers until July 2026)
