= Impractical Jokers season 4 =

Impractical Jokers
- Season 4
- No. of episodes: 26

Release
- Original network: truTV
- Original release: January 29 – October 22, 2015

Season chronology
- ← Previous; Season 3 Next → Season 5

This is a list of episodes from the fourth season of Impractical Jokers.

== Episodes ==
| No. overall | No. in season | Title | Original air date | Losing Joker(s) | U.S. viewers (millions) |
|---|---|---|---|---|---|
| 76 | 1 | "Welcome to Miami" | January 29, 2015 | Q | 1.23 |
The guys head to Miami for the season 4 premiere. They ride around in mobility scooters that are controlled by the other Jokers, complete embarrassing tasks on the beach, and team up posing as nightclub bouncers. Punishment: Q is forced to pose as an alligator expert, thinking he is going to give a presentation to a crowd, when in actuality, he has to retrieve his backpack from one of the gators. However, after Q gets the backpack, the other Jokers reveal that the backpack is not even his.: This is the first time Q is punished in a season premiere.
| 77 | 2 | "Below the Belt" | February 5, 2015 | Murr | 1.00 |
The guys try to teach fencing, but Q unknowingly encounters an Olympic athlete at his own defense. Then, they do and say what they are told as employees at a barbershop. Punishment: Sal, Q and Joe, hiding under a podium, are allowed to do whatever they please to the lower half of Murr's body as he is forced to give a presentation on climate change.
| 78 | 3 | "Uncool and the Gang" | February 12, 2015 | Joe | 0.95 |
The guys team up to host a team building seminar, and head down to the shore to act as horrible caricature artists. Punishment: Joe is forced to interview a thug-like motorcycling club with ridiculous questions that were written by the other Jokers. As this is going on, he repeatedly is forced to refer to the club as a "gang", much to the bikers' increasing anger. Joe's final "question" is actually a request to give him a wedgie, which the bikers, already annoyed with him, are only too happy to administer.
| 79 | 4 | "Wrong Playwright" | February 19, 2015 | Q | 1.09 |
The guys go head to head playing hide-and-sneak at the supermarket, and draw straws at a BBQ joint causing trouble. Punishment: Q is forced to pose as a playwright giving workshop lessons to young actors, having them act out scenes based on real-life events of his. At the end of the session, he presents synopses for new plays that he is supposedly in the process of writing.
| 80 | 5 | "Elevating The Game" | February 26, 2015 | Sal | 1.14 |
The guys serve up awkwardness at a burger restaurant, go head-to-head having no one to blame but themselves at a department store, and make up bizarre words with odd definitions at the park. Punishment: Thinking he's on his way to a challenge, Sal steps into a hotel elevator, along with 2 strangers. The elevator is controlled by his friends. At the thirty-first floor, they stop the elevator, and while the crew fake a rescue, the passengers are revealed to be sick and carrying a cat, respectively. After a while, Sal notices the hidden cameras, and is subsequently released from the elevator.
| 81 | 6 | "The Blunder Years" | March 5, 2015 | Murr | 1.23 |
The jokers try to get convenience store shoppers to side with them after being soaked by an angry acquaintance, and team up to showcase their event planning business at a wedding expo. Punishment: Under the original impression that he has to participate in a bodybuilding competition, Murr is forced to give an interview to his childhood celebrity crush Danica McKellar while greased up and wearing nothing but a patriotic swim briefs.
| 82 | 7 | "Deal With The Devils" | March 12, 2015 | Sal and Q | 1.02 |
The guys go head-to-head acting not so silent at a college library, and hunt for their imaginary wives again at a mall. Punishment: While Q and Sal dress up as goaltenders, they are forced to block slapshots received by former New Jersey Devils players Grant Marshall and Colin White at a Devils game.
| 83 | 8 | "Damned If You Do" | March 26, 2015 | Murr | 0.98 |
The guys go head-to-head hitting the ice rink to play a slippery balloon game and try to get support for ridiculous causes at the park. Punishment: Murr is forced to join an audience of movie goers where it is revealed that the film of the night is his shameful 1998 short film Damned. Then, film critic Alison Bailes invites Murr downstage to speak about how he made the movie.
| 84 | 9 | "The Dream Crusher" | April 2, 2015 | Sal | 0.93 |
The guys pucker up at the food court trying to find a selected stranger to kiss, and show focus group attendees their latest life stories, published as movies. Punishment: Sal is forced to pose as a judge for a children's talent show, and do and say whatever he is told by the other guys, such as complaining to a contestant that he still hasn't gotten the chicken wings he ordered an hour prior. What he doesn't know is that the participants are in on the joke, though the audience is not. Note: Following Joe Gatto's departure in December 2021, this episode has been banned from airing on television, along with seven other episodes involving Joe in a "compromising situation." It is not available for streaming on HBO Max in the US.
| 85 | 10 | "Joke & Dagger" | April 9, 2015 | Murr | 0.95 |
The jokers annoy art-loving patrons at a gallery opening, and pass bizarre judgements on unsuspecting grocery store shoppers. Punishment: At the Coney Island circus sideshow performance, Murr is forced to volunteer for the brand new "Wheel of Doom" stunt, in which he is placed on a spinning wheel surrounded by balloons, which are to be popped with knives. However, the machine is actually rigged to pop the balloons on its own, and the stunt performer is only faking throwing the knives.
| 86 | 11 | "Pseudo-Sumo" | April 16, 2015 | Joe | 1.09 |
The guys team up to work at an ice rink rental counter, tell strangers to mind their manners at a mall, and convince strangers to leave a cafe. Punishment: Under the impression that he is to perform in a commercial, Joe is fitted in a baby costume and finds that he will be fighting Ulambayaryn Byambajav the 2009 US Champion sumo wrestler.
| 87 | 12 | "Car Sick" | April 23, 2015 | Q | 1.05 |
The guys go head-to-head participating in a focus group again and go head-to-head playing a toilet paper battle at a grocery store. Punishment: Q is forced to eat a messy three-course meal in his Jeep Wrangler as a stunt driver known as "Racecar Bob" drives the car along an obstacle course. At one point he is joined by a guest named, "Sloppy Joe," a shirtless overweight man who messily drinks milk.
| 88 | 13 | "Cruisin' For A Bruisin'" | May 7, 2015 | Murr, then Joe | 1.08 |
The guys set sail for a special cruise ship mid-season finale episode. They make the pool deck their own playground, and team up to give out misinformation as entertainment directors. Punishments: Murr and Joe are given two different separate punishments. First, Murr is forced to pose as the ship's master of ceremonies and has to read a speech written by the other Jokers. Then, Joe is forced to interrupt a cannonballing competition at one of the pools and must continuously belly-flop into the water until the others allow him to stop.
| 89 | 14 | "Bathroom Break" | July 16, 2015 | Sal | 1.33 |
The guys do what they are told while selling auto parts, and team up to try to reel in unsuspecting shoppers' bags using a fish hook at the mall. Punishment: The three other Jokers forced Sal to put his hands into sludge to grab a toy fire truck that meant nothing for his punishment, just so they can have the perfect opportunity to make him go wash his hands while locked in a washroom controlled by them. He must complete a set of riddles to escape. At the end, Sal was rescued by a firefighter. This features a special guest appearance from Sal's disappointed father at the end of the punishment.
| 90 | 15 | "Kill the Centaur" | July 23, 2015 | Murr | 1.01 |
The guys use their bad service skills as sporting goods salesmen, and compete head-to-head in a game called "Do It Better" on the streets. Punishment: Murr is forced to dress in ridiculous outfits as he plays a ring girl at a live televised boxing match. Costumes included a Vegas showgirl and centaur. Note: Following Joe Gatto's departure in December 2021, this episode has been banned from airing on television, along with seven other episodes involving Joe in a "compromising situation." It is still available on HBO Max in the US.
| 91 | 16 | "Captain Fatbelly" | July 30, 2015 | Joe | 0.93 |
The guys lend an unhelpful hand as employees at the high-tech store Hammacher Schlemmer, and search for bizarre perps on the loose in the Palisades Center mall. Punishment: Under the original impression that the Jokers would be completing challenges aboard the Roosevelt Island Tramway, Joe is forced to complete challenges on top of the tram as it travels high above the East River while dressed as a fictional superhero, Captain Fatbelly. This is also the guys' revenge for the tattoo punishment in "The Permanent Punishment".
| 92 | 17 | "Sneaking Number Twos, Going Number One" | August 6, 2015 | Sal | 0.88 |
The guys compete in another game of "Put-Pocket" at the grocery store, and take over each other's cell phones at the park. Punishment: Sal is locked in an escape room with strangers who try to solve riddles in order to get out. But, in the middle of solving the riddles, Sal is forced to pee his pants in front of all the strangers. Afterwards, he must finish figuring out how to escape while wearing soiled pants.
| 93 | 18 | "Blind Justice" | August 13, 2015 | Sal | 0.92 |
The guys get punchy while giving boxing lessons, and head to the mall where they share the gift of music with strangers. Punishment: While wearing blacked-out sunglasses, Sal is forced to pose as a prison inmate thinking he's going to give a presentation to a group of troubled teens, when he's actually speaking at a senior citizen center.
| 94 | 19 | "Tied and Feathered" | August 20, 2015 | Murr | 0.96 |
The guys teach a crash course in sorry behavior, go head-to-head settling bizarre debates at a discount store, and spread good news at the mall. Punishment: Murr is chained to a park bench and is forced to endure whatever punishments the other Jokers send to him, such as being doused in maple syrup and feathered, getting hit by tennis balls, having a wood chipper pointed at him, and spit-out fruits and vegetables.
| 95 | 20 | "Smushed" | August 27, 2015 | Q | 0.98 |
The guys team up for security presentations, hold hands with others at the park, and compete head-to-head stumping each other at a florist. Punishment: Q is forced to do whatever the other guys tell him to do while dressed up as "Smush" the clown at a children's birthday party.
| 96 | 21 | "Live Punishment Special" | September 3, 2015 | Joe | 1.74 |
This live one-hour special is hosted by Howie Mandel in front of a live audience in New York City to commemorate the show's 100th episode. The pre-recorded challenges shown: The guys conduct interviews while the others try to make them laugh from behind a two-way mirror, fake injuries at a grocery store, and cross off their "bucket list" items. Punishment: All four are punished (for the second ever four-way punishment, the first being in "Supercuts") walking a tightrope high in the air. Although all four have to walk a tightrope five stories above, Joe is the loser of the pre-recorded challenges. He has to reprise his role as "Captain Fatbelly" from a previous punishment. The Jokers who attempt a walk on the tightrope earn $10,000, while the Joker who walked the farthest earns $50,000. All the prize winnings go to their charities. Q is the only one to make it across the whole rope, making him the winner. Murr walks 9.7 feet, Sal walks 9.2 feet, and Joe walks 5 feet.
| 97 | 22 | "The Big Uneasy" | September 10, 2015 | Sal | 0.58 |
The guys visit New Orleans and team up to steal sips from people's drinks at a bar, work with the wheel of voo-doom, and crash a horse and buggy ride. Punishment: Sal and the Jokers head to the New Orleans swamp, where Sal is forced to dress as a Bog Monster for an ongoing tour. At the end, Sal is surprised by another Bog Monster that is camouflaged behind him.
| 98 | 23 | "Hopeless and Changeless" | September 24, 2015 | Murr | 0.70 |
The guys ask people at the park if they agree or disagree with their bizarre points of view, team up to give lessons on real estate, and complete three assigned tasks at a greeting card store. Punishment: Murr is forced to sell concessions to patrons at a horse race track, and cannot give any change back to them if they buy from him. After drawing an angry crowd, he ends up escaping on a track cart.
| 99 | 24 | "Stripped of Dignity" | October 8, 2015 | Joe | 0.87 |
The guys try to convince strangers into watching after their kid to complete some ridiculous errands and host taste tests with awkward survey questions that have been written by the other guys. Punishment: Joe is forced to pose as a stripogram at a park using different outfits. He has to find whoever has ordered a striptease. Joe strips several outfits such as a football player and police officer only to find out that nobody has ordered a stripogram. When Joe finds out, he retaliated by strip teasing Sal. Note: Following Joe Gatto's departure in December 2021, this episode has been banned from airing on television, along with seven other episodes involving Joe in a "compromising situation." It is not available for streaming on HBO Max.
| 100 | 25 | "The Taunted House" | October 15, 2015 | Sal | 0.98 |
The guys work at a pizza parlor, and then ask strangers to translate text messages written in Spanish on Wall Street. Punishment: Sal has to go into a haunted house to blow out candles in different rooms, each with something to scare him.
| 101 | 26 | "Doomed" | October 22, 2015 | Murr | 0.71 |
The jokers act as tailors, and ask strangers if they can borrow their phones on the streets. Punishment: Three months prior, Murr is forced to continue shaving his chest (as he does every week), except for a circle around each of his nipples (so it looked like a coconut bra). The day of his punishment, he must walk around a park showing off his chest. But it goes downhill as groups of people (in various group costumes) interrupt his "punishment", ending with a group who puts Murr in shackles. During this part, Sal yells out that it is revenge for Murr marrying his sister in "Brother-in-Loss". They then proceed to burn a blankie which Murr believes is his very sentimental blankie (which he still sleeps with every night since he was four and his grandmother knit it for him) in front of him. The punishment ends and Joe tells Murr that he had what seems to be the real blankie the whole time (but this is another trick) and the one the group burned was a decoy. While Murr sighs in relief, Joe throws the blankie into the fire anyway. However, about a day later, Murr revealed that his actual, real blankie was on his chair at home and Joe used another decoy to trick him. The chest hair had nothing to do with the actual punishment.

Punishment Count:

- Sal - 8 (including joint punishments) Total now: 33
- Joe - 6 (including joint punishments) Total now: 23
- Murr - 9 (including joint punishments) Total now: 31
- Q - 5 (including joint punishments) Total now: 23
