= Rachel Sklar =

American journalist

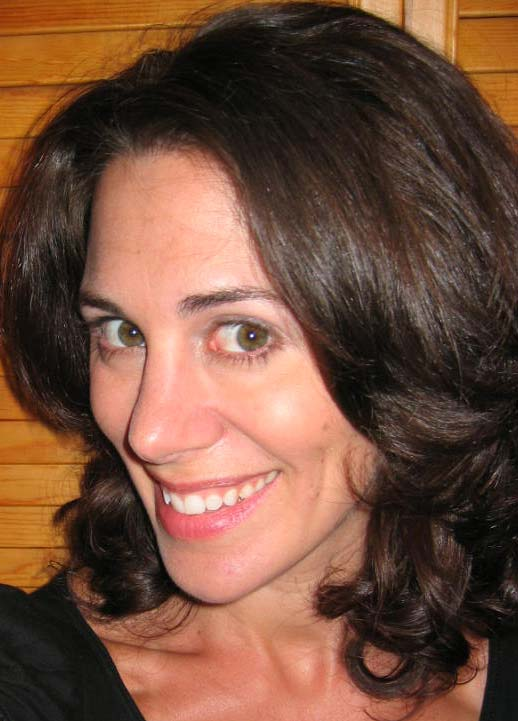
- Born: December 8, 1972 (age 53); Toronto, Ontario, Canada
- Education: The University of Western Ontario; University of Toronto
- Occupations: Attorney, blogger, journalist
- Website: The Huffington Post

Rachel Sklar (born December 8, 1972) is a Canadian lawyer, CNN contributor, and media blogger.

== Early years ==
Sklar was born to a Jewish family in Toronto, Ontario, Canada. She is a graduate of the University of Western Ontario where she was the Vice-President Communications of the University Students' Council, as well as a regular contributor to the campus newspaper, The Gazette. She was also an active member of the University of Western Ontario Debating Society. She graduated with honors from the University of Toronto Faculty of Law, where she was valedictorian.

== Career ==
Sklar became a full-time freelance journalist on a wide array of topics. Her work has been published in the New York Times, Glamour, Financial Times, Chicago Tribune, Wallpaper, New York Post, and Village Voice. Her numerous publications in Canada include the self-published book A Stroke of Luck: Life, Crisis and Rebirth of a Stroke Survivor (Toronto: 1998, Parnassus Books), which she co-authored with the dentist Howard Rocket (the father of a childhood friend) about his stroke and recovery.

Sklar was, until 7 November 2008, the Media & Special Projects Editor for the Huffington Post. She wrote and edited the site's Eat The Press page. She previously wrote and edited FishbowlNY, a New York-based media industry blog. Sklar is a guest panelist on Fox News Watch, a current events debate program on the Fox News Channel, and has made appearances on Red Eye w/ Greg Gutfeld, which is also a Fox News program. She also made an appearance on the hit tv show, called "Impractical Jokers".

In January 2009, she left the Huffington Post to join The Daily Beast. She has worked for Dan Abrams, at Abrams Research and as Editor-at-Large for Mediaite.

She is the founder of two advocacy sites: Change The Ratio, which promotes the careers of women in new media and tech; and Charitini.com, which promotes social micro-giving. In 2013, Sklar soft launched tech start-up, The Li.st, that serves as "a platform for awesome women."

== Recognition ==
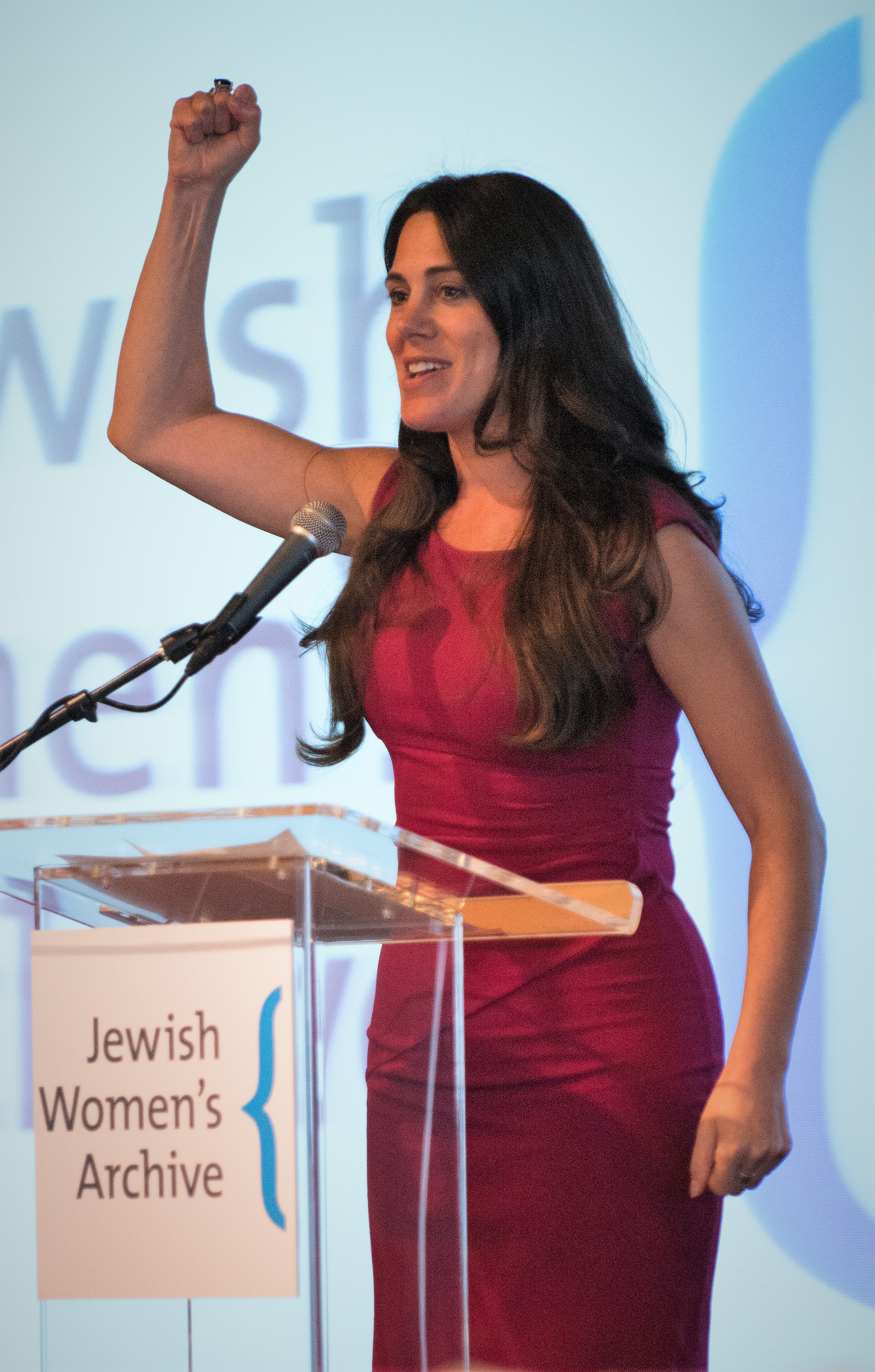
Sklar honored at 2013 Jewish Women's Archive luncheon

In 2010, she was listed by The Wall in "Social media movers and shakers: The ones to watch in 2011" along with Ben Parr and Murray Newlands, and listed in 2011 Silicon Alley (NYC) 100 List by Business Insider for Change the Ratio. In 2012, Sklar was listed as one of Datamation's list of "10 Women in Tech Who Give Back." In 2015 she and her daughter Ruby (born that year) were named as part of The Forward 50.
