= Impractical Jokers season 3 =

Impractical Jokers
- Season 3
- No. of episodes: 31

Release
- Original network: truTV
- Original release: January 2 – October 30, 2014

Season chronology
- ← Previous; Season 2 Next → Season 4

This is a list of episodes from the third season of Impractical Jokers.

== Episodes ==
No. overall	No. in season	Title	Original air date	Losing Joker(s)	U.S. viewers (millions)
45	1	"Look Out Below"	January 2, 2014	Murr	1.37
The Jokers work as bellhops, serve up trouble at a hot dog cart, and go head-to-head presenting odd inventions to a focus group. Punishment: Under the original impression that all of the guys are teaching skydiving classes as a challenge, Murr is forced to conquer his fear of heights when he has to go skydiving himself.
46	2	"The Great Escape"	January 9, 2014	Joe	1.56
The guys teach music classes as instructors and go head-to-head moderating and participating in a focus group. Punishment: Posing as "The Great Nose-ini" at the Borgata in New Jersey, Joe is forced to be bound in a straitjacket, chains, and ropes, and lowered into a tank of water to perform an escape act in front of an audience. In "Funny 'Cause It Hurts", Joe said he was left bound in the tank of water for 45 minutes.
47	3	"Field of Screams"	January 16, 2014	Sal	1.42
The guys must do dares in the park while attempting to guess the other Jokers' voices on a voice changer, try to get applause while quitting their jobs, and team up for dinosaur presentations. Punishment: Sal is forced to follow a rope through a cornfield maze and endure several obstacles and scares throughout.
48	4	"Nationals Disaster"	January 23, 2014	Joe	1.90
The Jokers cause mischief at the grocery store, try to give away items from the "mystery bag", and search for "The Chosen One" at a food court. Punishment: Joe is forced to pretend to be a gymnast in a roomful of actual gymnasts and must, among other things, perform his "routine" in front of everyone.
49	5	"Bonus Footage"	January 30, 2014	clip show	1.25
The Jokers present never before seen footage.
50	6	"Toasted"	February 6, 2014	Sal	1.39
The guys work as waiters at the Carnegie Deli, and Joey Fatone makes a guest appearance, standing in for Q. Then, the guys go head-to-head settling ridiculous debates at another deli. Punishment: Sal has to pretend to be a wedding guest and must read a toast the other guys have prepared for him. Unbeknownst to Sal, the bride and groom are in on the joke while the other guests at the wedding are not.
51	7	"Scarytales"	February 13, 2014	Q	1.24
The Jokers attend a singles' gathering and ask strangers in the park if they can borrow their phones. Punishment: Q has to pose as a children's book author and reads to a group of children an increasingly inappropriate story that the other jokers wrote called "The Remarkable Misadventures of Q the Dung Beetle."
52	8	"Inside the Vault"	February 20, 2014	clip show	1.15
The Jokers present footage from the cutting room floor, including a challenge that was never aired, and the reaction of someone being pranked.
53	9	"Bigger in Texas"	March 27, 2014	Q	1.48
While visiting the Lone Star State, the Jokers team up to teach classes at a dude ranch, sell cowboy boots, and wear blacked-out sunglasses. Punishment: During the final challenge, believing that Murr would never tell an elderly couple that they remember the Alamo, Q takes a loss on the whole episode in a bet and loses. As a result, he is announced as a horse wrangler at a rodeo. An actual professional enters the arena and ropes Q around the ankles, taking him on a trip through the arena as the crowd mocks him.
54	10	"Snow Way Out"	April 1, 2014	Murr and Sal	1.09
The guys work at a liquor store, obey commands written for them on deli tickets, and try to get signatures for a made-up holiday. Punishment: Suspended in a halted ski lift, Sal and Murr are pelted with snowballs and then shot at with paintball guns by Joe and Q.
55	11	"Takes the Cake"	April 10, 2014	Joe	1.07
The guys do what they are told at a ski lodge, and play the uninvited dinner guest at an Italian restaurant. Punishment: Joe is forced to dress up in a sailor's outfit and jump out of a cake to surprise what he thinks is a bachelorette party, but is really a celebration for army veterans. He must then do and say what he is told by the other Jokers.
56	12	"Anniversary Edition"	April 17, 2014	clip show	1.10
For the show's three-year anniversary, the guys look back at some never before seen footage.
57	13	"Jokers Playhouse"	May 15, 2014	Murr	1.10
The guys conduct interviews while the others try to make them laugh from behind a two-way mirror, and strike up a conversation with people using only a single word at a park. Punishment: Murr is forced to watch the other Jokers wreck his apartment on live TV under the guise of being a fake kids' show called Murr’s Playhouse.
58	14	"Make Womb for Daddy"	May 22, 2014	Q	1.22
The guys team up to work at a submarine sandwich shop, team up to have each other guess their specific secret tasks at a food court, and repeat a cycle of tasks at a park in a Joker vs. Joker challenge. Punishment: Q is forced to teach a Lamaze class to a roomful of pregnant women. But halfway through, a nurse enters and hooks Q up to a device that simulates the eight stages of painful child labor.
59	15	"Puncture Perfect"	May 29, 2014	Murr	1.24
The guys must obey three specialized commands at a video game store, coax rock climbers into repeating a specific word, and do a Joker vs. Joker challenge, selling fake tickets. Punishment: Murr is forced to answer questions about the other guys, or spin the "Wheel of Piercings", which assigns him a body part that he has to get pierced. Three correct answers ends the punishment; Murr winds up having both nipples and his belly button pierced. The latter piercing was a joker's choice.
60	16	"Junk in the Trunk"	June 12, 2014	Sal	1.31
The guys team up for presentations that have nothing to do with the topic, try to touch people at a mall with different body parts, and quit their jobs again. Punishment: Sal is forced to ride around town in a car's trunk. Upon finding Sal in the trunk, the woman driving starts screaming and hitting Sal with groceries. The Jokers later reveal to Sal that the woman, Murr's friend Melissa, knew he was in there the whole time, and that they are only a block away from where they started.
61	17	"The Good, the Bad, and the Uncomfortable"	June 19, 2014	clip show	0.96
The Jokers (in the first episode presented to a live audience) look back at compilations of memorable moments.
62	18	"Baggage Shame"	June 24, 2014	Joe	1.26
The guys share secrets with grocery store shoppers, team up to help customers at an art store, and try to get pictures for a fake blog. Punishment: At JFK International Airport, Joe is forced to be given a special itinerary with tasks to complete. These embarrassing tasks include posing as a limousine driver for "Jugs McBulge", stealing people's luggage and putting it back on the carousel, frisking people down, and announcing to strangers that he is picking up his naked blow up doll.
63	19	"Quantum Mock-anics"	July 10, 2014	Joe	1.15
The Jokers team up to work at a beauty supply store, coerce strangers into translating text messages written in Spanish in Times Square, and do another round of "Don't I Know You?" at the mall. Punishment: All four pose as scientists on a panel discussing quantum physics, with Joe being forced to explain to an audience several topics on the subject in the worst way he can.
64	20	"Clash of the Jokers"	July 17, 2014	Murr, Sal and Q	0.78
In the second episode shown to a live audience, the Jokers review clips of four Joker vs. Joker challenges. The challenges include participating in a focus group, competing to have their baseball team mascots approved, settling a dancing debate in the mall, and presenting their ridiculous book ideas. Punishment: Although it is a clip show, Joe counts up all the challenges they viewed and states that he has won the most (Q, Murr, and Sal all lose two each). So to 'punish' the other guys, 'King' Joe has Q fan him with a palm frond, has Sal feed him grapes, and uses Murr as a throne while the credits roll.
65	21	"Tooth & Consequences"	July 24, 2014	Murr	1.21
The guys work as attendants in a bridal dress shop and team up competing head-to-head to present bad-smelling fragrance advertising campaigns to focus groups. Punishment: During a normal challenge where the Jokers have to take selfies with strangers, Murr's tooth unexpectedly falls out, resulting in him choosing to take a loss on the challenge. When the other Jokers tell him that his taking the loss means he's the big loser for the whole episode, they decide his on-the-spot punishment will be to complete the task anyway with a gap in his teeth.
66	22	"Fe-Mail"	July 31, 2014	Joe	1.05
The guys must do what they are told while getting massages, reveal some uncomfortable thoughts to strangers in the park, and obey tasks given to them on a slot machine. Punishment: Joe is forced to dress up like a woman, thinking he is going to participate in a fashion show, but it is actually a seminar for tech students involving new app ideas, and he has to go through the presentation dressed the way he is.
67	23	"The Lost Boy"	August 7, 2014	Q	1.08
The guys talk business with strangers at a networking event, team up to teach a photography class, and complete tasks in a certain amount of time in the park. Punishment: Q is forced to dress up like Peter Pan, thinking he's going to join a musical while it is going on, but it is really a wrestling match at a House of Hardcore event, where he faces off against the promotion's founder Tommy Dreamer.
68	24	"Up Loser's Creek"	August 14, 2014	Sal	0.96
The guys team up to present lousy telemarketing presentations, make odd wishes at a fountain at the mall, and try to analyze people's dreams on the boardwalk. Punishment: Sal starts off giving a boat tour of New York City while reading from cards written by the other guys. At the end of the tour, the other Jokers surprise Sal by making him kayak on the high seas of the disgusting Hudson River. Sal later falls off the kayak into the water.
69	25	"In Poor Taste Buds"	September 25, 2014	Murr	0.88
The Jokers serve up some tips teaching indoor tennis and return to the park for another game of "Now!" Punishment: Murr is forced to give a presentation on exotic foods after having novocaine injected into his gums, making it impossible to speak clearly or taste the food.
70	26	"The Permanent Punishment"	October 2, 2014	Murr, Sal and Q	1.01
The Jokers act as security guards at a drug store, and go head-to-head in a rematch clipping balloons onto grocery store shoppers. Punishment: Q, Murr, and Sal are punished with embarrassing tattoos chosen by Joe. Q gets a cat tattoo that said "38. Lives Alone. Has 3 Cats." Murr gets a ferret skydiving (referring to his punishment in "Look Out Below"), and Sal gets a tattoo of Jaden Smith.
71	27	"Parks and Wreck"	October 9, 2014	Sal	0.71
The Jokers must do what they are told at a public pool, and try to convince strangers to give the thumbs-up to their absurd emails. Punishment: Sal is forced to present his new idea for a senior citizen's park before a city council in an effort to get it approved.
72	28	"A Legendary Fail"	October 16, 2014	Murr	0.96
The guys work stadium security, team up to conduct a crime investigation class, and return to the park to test their memories again. Punishment: Murr is forced to open for Legends in Concert, while the other Jokers take control of what comes out of his microphone.
73	29	"B-I-N-G-NO"	October 23, 2014	Sal	1.14
The guys work at Katz's Delicatessen and take turns running a popsicle cart in Union Square. Punishment: Sal is forced to take part in a bingo tournament and shout "bingo" at regular intervals, to the growing annoyance of the rest of the people in the room. Finally, someone calls security and Sal is escorted off the premises.
74	30	"Just Say No"	October 28, 2014	Q	0.98
The guys pose as blackjack dealers at a Connecticut casino, team up to play another hint and guess game at the park, and go head-to-head acting as shoe shiners. Punishment: At a Brooklyn Cyclones baseball game, Q is forced to publicly refuse a marriage proposal in front of everyone in the stadium. Then, he has to face the wrath of the crowd and the proposer.
75	31	"Brother-in-Loss"	October 30, 2014	Sal	0.92
The guys must explain their off-color resumes while applying for a job at Appetizer Mobile and complete a series of bizarre gestures outside a Staten Island Ferry terminal. Punishment: While strapped to a hand truck, Sal is forced to watch his sister, Jenna, marry Murr in a church filled with guests, including the parents of Sal, Jenna, and Murr. In a video played at the wedding ceremony, he sees that both Murr and Jenna legally signed a marriage license on March 13, 2014. In "Funny 'Cause It Hurts", Murr said this was revenge for his skydiving punishment in "Look Out Below".

Punishment Count After This Season:

- Sal - 10 (including joint punishments) Total now: 25
- Joe - 6 (including joint punishments) Total now: 17
- Murr - 9 (including joint punishments) Total now: 22
- Q - 7 (including joint punishments) Total now: 18
