= Jesse Bravo =

American psychic medium

Jesse Bravo is an American psychic known for being an investment banker, media personality and psychic medium. He appeared in the Impractical Jokers episode "Medium, Well Done", where he performed a psychic evaluation on Sal Vulcano.
