= Impractical Jokers season 2 =

Impractical Jokers
- Season 2
- No. of episodes: 28

Release
- Original network: truTV
- Original release: September 6, 2012 – December 12, 2013

Season chronology
- ← Previous; Season 1 Next → Season 3

This is a list of episodes from the second season of Impractical Jokers.

== Episodes ==
No. overall	No. in season	Title	Original air date	Losing Joker(s)	U.S. viewers (millions)
17	1	"Elephant in the Room"	September 6, 2012	Sal	1.72
The Jokers work in a dentist's office, annoy patrons at a movie theater, participate in a crazy photography shoot at a public park for their blogs, and do a Joker vs. Joker challenge telling strangers their humiliating thoughts. Punishment: Similar to his punishment in the series premiere, Sal is forced to handle animal feces. He has to unearth his car keys from a heap of elephant poop using his bare hands at the Meadowlands State Fair. When Sal has suffered enough, it turns out that Joe was holding his keys the entire time.
18	2	"The Stoop Sessions Part 1"	September 13, 2012	clip show	1.52
The guys review their favorite moments from season one, and they reveal the most surprising occurrences, the best overall reactions and never-before-seen footage.
19	3	"Art Attack"	September 20, 2012	Murr	1.72
The guys try get strangers to hold their hands in a park, annoy the patrons at a comic book store, participate in a competitive race down an aisle at a grocery store, and try to get strangers to volunteer their time for an odd event. Punishment: In revenge for Q's photography punishment in "Who Arted", Murr is forced to explain some off-color art pieces the other guys have created for him to a roomful of art fanatics.
20	4	"The Stoop Sessions Part 2"	September 27, 2012	clip show	1.20
The guys review their favorite moments from season one, and they reveal the most surprising occurrences, the best overall reactions and never-before-seen footage.
21	5	"Strip High Five"	December 13, 2012	Joe and Murr	1.69
The guys team up to offer inaccurate sensitivity training to strangers, observe surprise celebrities while on the street, and work as rude receptionists in an office. Punishment: In the show's first double punishment, Joe and Murray are forced to stand in front of hundreds of strangers and must get a high-five, but for every high-five they don't get, they have to remove an article of clothing, and the punishment doesn't end until one of them is naked. Murr loses the punishment and winds up naked, making Joe the winner.
22	6	"Birds and the Bees"	December 13, 2012	Q	1.87
The Jokers try to convince strangers to share a secret in a park, work in a White Castle drive-through, and attempt to persuade innocent bystanders to participate in a dance with them in a park. Punishment: Q is forced to teach sex education to his parents, under the original impression that he would be teaching a room of 6th grade students. In the "Happy Father's Day!" episode, it was mentioned that the lesson was 45-minutes long.
23	7	"Sound EffeXXX"	December 20, 2012	Sal	1.56
The guys reveal strange devices to focus groups, attempt to use people as pillows in a park, and try to persuade grocery shoppers not to purchase their wanted items. Punishment: The guys broadcast sexual noises on a laptop being used by Sal in a peaceful café.
24	8	"Do Something To My Face"	December 27, 2012	Joe	1.97
The Jokers go head-to-head utilizing strangers at Jersey Gardens to mediate their mindless conflicts, complete specialized tasks at Dairy Queen, and start protests for ridiculous causes at a park. Punishment: As a result of Joe taking the loss on the whole episode, he is forced to allow strangers to do as they please to his face while trapped in a pillory outside a Staten Island Ferry terminal.
25	9	"Psychotic Not-Line"	January 3, 2013	Sal	2.01
The guys shake hands with department store shoppers, spin "The Wheel of Doom" at a park, and work at a teppanyaki restaurant. Punishment: Sal is forced to pose as a psychic in front of an audience and the punishment does not end until he makes an accurate prediction.
26	10	"The Truth Hurts"	January 10, 2013	Murr	1.75
The Jokers attempt to successfully find a house-sitter despite the other guys' interventions, convince strangers of the existence of obscure places, get grocery shoppers to agree about a strange weird word, and play "Pick Your Poison" in a park. Punishment: Murr is forced to take a polygraph exam administered by Daniel Ribacoff that consists of asking Murr personal and humiliating questions in front of students at their old high school.
27	11	"Get Out of Dodge"	January 17, 2013	Murr	1.69
The guys try to work as optometrists, team up to provide incorrect financial advice, and attempt to secure numerous votes by campaigning on ridiculous political platforms. Punishment: Murr is forced to play dodgeball alone against a professional team, while one eye is blindfolded and one hand is covered by an oven mitt, and the punishment does not end until he manages to get a player out.
28	12	"The Love Expert"	January 24, 2013	Joe	1.81
The guys go head-to-head having debates at a mall, try to teach a dance class, attempt to sell fake tickets to Broadway shows, and get their fitness on at a gym as personal trainers. Punishment: Joe is forced give a talk on relationship issues and answer "yes" to questions supposedly written by the audience; he does not know that the other Jokers have changed the questions.
29	13	"Out of Fashion"	February 7, 2013	Q	2.08
The guys host a taste test with uncomfortable survey questions afterward, negotiate for worthless items at a flea market, have conversations with strangers at a park for at least 30 seconds, and work as attendants at a gas station. Punishment: Q is forced to host a fashion show and explain clothing designs supposedly created by him such as an extreme goth person with long black hair. Two people leave during the show mid-way and Q, in a face-saving gesture, tries to claim credit for designing their outfits.
30	14	"Scaredy Cat"	February 14, 2013	Sal	1.68
The jokers test themselves with the terrifying "Wheel of Doom", team up to advertise terrible ideas to a bunch of agency professionals, work as custodians at a mall food court, and work at the dentist's office again. Punishment: Sal's fear of cats is put to the ultimate test when the other Jokers force him to step into a cage full of felines in front of an audience under the impression that he is teaching a cat-bonding seminar.
31	15	"Joker vs. Joker"	February 21, 2013	Q and Sal	1.93
The guys engage in a round of Joker vs. Joker challenges which include giving palm readings, free medical checkups, manicures and pedicures, act as receptionists, pose as pizza restaurant employees, and patrol the beach. Punishment: Q and Sal are forced to play "Miss and a Swing", where they attempt to make a basketball shot and for each time they miss, they get whacked in the leg by a 5th grader holding a plastic bat. While Q missed and got hit multiple times, Sal made the shot on his first try.
32	16	"Down in the Dump"	August 1, 2013	Sal	1.64
The guys race to see who can slip the most pencils onto unsuspecting grocery shoppers, guide each other through a park wearing darkened sunglasses, and team up posing as vacation planners with unusual presentations. Punishment: Sal is forced to locate his brand-new cellphone in an enormous pile of garbage while traveling on a moving barge. This is the second time Sal's punishment involves searching for his personal belonging hidden in an unsavory place; the first being in the season premiere.
33	17	"Human Piñata"	August 8, 2013	Murr	1.49
The Jokers compete to promote inventions made by the other guys, try to get hugs as apologies for things they have "done" in a park, and ask strangers for help finding their missing wives at a mall. Punishment: Murr is forced to be elevated by a crane, and endure getting hit by bats as if he were a Piñata {by children; Joe, Q, and Sal; and Joe's brother-in-law}, the punishment doesn't stop until candy comes out.
34	18	"Sweat the Small Things"	August 15, 2013	Sal	1.61
The guys teach art classes and test fate with the Dartboard of Destiny at a bar. Punishment: Sal is forced to introduce a stress-relieving slideshow presentation. In the demo videos, it turns out that Joe, Murr, and Q broke into Sal's house while he was on vacation and abused everything in the house, ending with pelvic thrusting while naked at the window in front of his neighbors.
35	19	"Film Fail"	August 22, 2013	Q	1.29
The guys have a race down the aisles while making eye contact with customers at a supermarket, pretend to be podiatrists, and ask for help burying mystery items in a park. Punishment: Q is forced to present some clips from a short film (directed by the other Jokers) to an audience of movie buffs.
36	20	"Not Safe For Work"	August 29, 2013	Murr	1.34
The guys perform embarrassing tasks to the word "Now!" in a park, team up for workplace safety presentations, and have cafe patrons review and rate their dating profiles. Punishment: Murr is forced to pose nude for a classroom of art enthusiasts.
37	21	"The Alliance"	September 5, 2013	Joe, Murr and Sal	1.41
The guys compete head-to-head trying to avoid laughing during slide show presentations, search for celebrity look-alikes again in a park, and vote for each other to do horrible challenges using paddles with their names on them. Punishment: Since Sal, Murr, and Joe formed an alliance against Q and lost to him in the final challenge, they each end up losers in the show's first triple punishment. Their punishment is to answer questions about Q's life while standing on a cliff hanging over a reservoir called "Q Falls", also known as Kaaterskill Falls. Every incorrect answer moves them closer to the edge, and three incorrect answers forces them to jump into the water. The punishment ends when one person is left standing and is officially declared "Q's best friend". With Sal and Murr ending up as the losers, Joe wins the challenge in the end and walks away with Q.
38	22	"Everything's Just Rosie"	September 12, 2013	Q	1.28
The Jokers team up to hit the fast lanes as humiliating bowlers in teams, dump scoops of mashed potatoes onto the plates of restaurant patrons, and go cloud watching with strangers in a park. Punishment: Q is forced to pose as the lead scientist for the made-up science company Quinndustries and go through a presentation on their achievements before announcing they have successfully completed the first cloning operation. This culminates in a surprise appearance from Rosie O'Donnell who emerges from a vault as Q's so-called "clone."
39	23	"Enter the Dragons"	October 24, 2013	Joe and Sal	1.08
The Jokers complete embarrassing tasks on a mall escalators, whisper "sweet nothings" to strangers at the supermarket, and ask offbeat survey questions at the zoo. Punishment: Sal and Joe are forced to form a band called "Senora Lonza," actually the name of their high school Spanish teacher, and perform at Jones Beach Theater as the opening act for Imagine Dragons' Night Visions Tour in front of a crowd of 15,000 while doing and saying with what they are told to by the Jokers and Imagine Dragons members Dan Reynolds and Wayne Sermon.
40	24	"Dog Days of Bummer"	October 31, 2013	Joe	1.17
The Jokers team up to take turns dipping fries into other peoples food at a mall food court, work at a beachside burger joint, and search for "Beth" in a park. Punishment: Joe is forced to walk his dog while wearing a variety of different humiliating outfits, such as a bee, a cowboy with exposed buttcheeks, and a bride in a wedding dress, until someone comments that he is cuter than his dog.
41	25	"Sorry for Your Loss"	November 7, 2013	Sal	1.23
The guys go head-to-head tournament style attaching balloons to unsuspecting grocery store shoppers, work at a music store, and go head-to-head fishing for compliments about their unique outfit choices. Punishment: Since Sal is the most apologetic out of all four Jokers, he is forced to do several rude things (stepping on someone's foot, woofing at a baby, sneezing on someone, blowing a portable air horn at someone, and flipping off an old lady) without saying "sorry" to anyone.
42	26	"All the Wrong Moves"	November 14, 2013	Q	1.48
The guys blindly follow each other's humiliating directions at a water park, compete head-to-head to sell their ridiculous book ideas, and try to convince unknowing strangers to save their seats in Times Square. Punishment: Q is forced to perform some of his "signature moves" with his own dance group "Q's Crew" in front of a live crowd at a baseball stadium.
43	27	"Cyber Buddies"	December 5, 2013	Murr	1.05
The Jokers work as grocery store cashiers and go head-to-head settling debates in a mall. Punishment: Murr is forced to host a computer cleanliness seminar while his laptop is controlled by the other guys, who plant embarrassing things for Murr to find. Several production staff video call pretending to be his gay lovers.
44	28	"Trouble Shoot"	December 12, 2013	Q	1.00
The jokers do and say what they are told at a department store, team up to lead a business luncheon, and pose as personal trainers for a gym. Punishment: Q is forced to be sent on a "video scavenger hunt" for the season finale, with his arm trapped in a cast, and get footage of whatever the Jokers tell him to get, such as a man's nipple and the inside of a Port-a-Potty.

Punishment Count:

- Sal - 10 (including joint punishments) Total now: 15
- Joe - 6 (including joint punishments) Total now: 11
- Murr - 8 (including joint punishments) Total now: 13
- Q - 7 (including joint punishments) Total now: 11
