= Impractical Jokers season 1 =

Impractical Jokers
- Season 1
- No. of episodes: 16

Release
- Original network: truTV
- Original release: December 15, 2011 – May 3, 2012

Season chronology
- Next → Season 2

This is a list of episodes from the first season of Impractical Jokers.

== Episodes ==
| No. overall | No. in season | Title | Original air date | Losing Joker(s) | U.S. viewers (millions) |
|---|---|---|---|---|---|
| 1 | 1 | "Pay It Forward" | December 15, 2011 | Sal | 1.52 |
In the show's pilot episode, the Jokers pretend to be eccentric White Castle and Costco cashiers, gather signatures in Union Square for causes the other Jokers have written for them, and answer tourist questions in Times Square. Punishment: In Sal's first punishment and the first punishment of the series, he is forced to pick up dog poop in a dog park in Union Square (Note: Union Square was mentioned as the location of the series premiere punishment during "Bad Carma") using a disposable plastic glove and hold it for 20 seconds.
| 2 | 2 | "Butterfly Crime Scene" | December 15, 2011 | Sal | 1.33 |
The group is challenged to apply the most sunscreen lotion to beach-goers, grab as many groceries from other customers at a grocery store as they can, survey amusement park guests at Six Flags Great Adventure, and pay the least at a frozen yogurt shop. Punishment: Sal is forced to make up a song called "Butterfly Crime Scene" to sing to hundreds of spectators at a baseball stadium. At the end of the song Sal gets pied in the face by the BlueClaws mascot, Buster.
| 3 | 3 | "Unmotivational Speaker" | December 22, 2011 | Sal | 1.50 |
The guys try off-color techniques of impressing women while speed dating and act as fortune tellers at a boardwalk. Later, they talk through an electric megaphone they cannot control and ask surprising questions of people in a pharmacy. Punishment: Sal is forced to pose as a motivational speaker delivering ludicrous methods of work ethics.
| 4 | 4 | "Boardwalk of Shame" | December 29, 2011 | Joe | 1.31 |
The guys play a game of "Don't I Know You?", invade beach-goers' towels, play a humorous word game with customers at a grocery store, and act as salesmen at a car dealership. Punishment: In Joe's first punishment, he is forced to go to the boardwalk and put a stranger's toe in his mouth.
| 5 | 5 | "Drawing a Blank" | January 5, 2012 | Sal | 1.48 |
The Jokers act as reporters preparing an interview, caricature artists in a mall, and oddball apartment dwellers looking for roommates, and cut in line for Broadway show tickets. Punishment: Sal is forced to pose as a published author and read an excerpt from a brand new book the other Jokers have created for him. However, the book is completely blank and Sal has to make up the excerpt of the book on the spot.
| 6 | 6 | "Panty Raid" | January 12, 2012 | Murr | 1.35 |
The guys team up to teach karate classes, give interviews from Times Square, persuade shoppers at a pharmacy to not buy products, and give uncomfortable massages on the boardwalk. Punishment: In Murr's first punishment, he is forced to steal a pair of woman's panties at a laundromat and wear them on his head for 10 seconds.
| 7 | 7 | "Out of TP" | January 19, 2012 | Joe | 1.61 |
The guys analyze handwriting at Jersey Gardens mall, steal food from customers' plates at a buffet, teach foreign languages that they do not speak to prospective students, and dance with strangers at a park. Punishment: Joe is forced to sit on the toilet with his pants down at a coffeehouse and asks for toilet paper in full view of the customers.
| 8 | 8 | "Who Arted" | January 26, 2012 | Q | 1.70 |
The guys pose as bakery salesmen, focus group analysts, and shoe salesmen, and teach classes at a gym. Punishment: In Q's first punishment, he is forced to explain his photography exhibit at an art gallery to a group of art enthusiasts, with each photo getting increasingly weirder.
| 9 | 9 | "A Loser Presents" | February 16, 2012 | Murr | 1.62 |
The guys return to White Castle, where Q's dad makes a cameo. Then, they pose as bouncers at a nightclub, read horoscopes at a mall, and give interviews at Grand Central Terminal. Punishment: Murr is forced to give a presentation to a college class about social networking that the other Jokers created for him.
| 10 | 10 | "What Did I Eat?" | March 29, 2012 | Q | 1.27 |
The Jokers pose as furniture salesmen at IKEA, pretend to be very unwelcoming members of a boardwalk welcoming committee, pitch some wacky memoirs to potential readers, and sell jewelry to couples. Punishment: Q is forced to smell the breaths of strangers until he guesses correctly what one of them ate.
| 11 | 11 | "Starfart Macchiato" | March 29, 2012 | Murr | 1.27 |
The guys play another round of "Don't I Know You?" with complete strangers, pose as driving school instructors and later shampoo boys at a women's hair salon, and share embarrassing text messages in a waiting room. Punishment: Murr's laptop at a coffeehouse makes loud farting noises, irritating the customers. Eventually the patrons leave out of annoyance and frustration.
| 12 | 12 | "Bellydancer" | April 5, 2012 | Joe | 1.31 |
The guys take jobs at a garden center, pose as deli employees, ask patrons questions about a drink, and try their luck as CPR instructors. Punishment: Joe is forced to pose as a nightclub belly dancer.
| 13 | 13 | "Charity Case" | April 12, 2012 | Murr | 1.84 |
The guys pose as puppy dog salesmen, try to start a new baseball chant that has nothing to do with baseball, get donations for a Broadway play that does not exist, hold the remote to a toy car they cannot control, and teach golf. Punishment: Murr is forced to explain a promotional video for a charity that does not exist, while embarrassment comes his way.
| 14 | 14 | "Theater del Absurdo" | April 19, 2012 | Joe | 1.71 |
The guys raise donations for bizarre charities, eat food off other people's plates at a Chinese restaurant, provide unsolicited advice to shoppers at Jersey Gardens mall, and play another round of "Don't I Know You?". Punishment: Joe is forced to announce to a packed movie theater that he has defecated his pants.
| 15 | 15 | "Pick a Loser" | April 26, 2012 | Q | 1.12 |
The Jokers eat food out of other people's shopping carts, try to kiss strangers, play word games with people in a bookstore, pose as professional photographers at Jersey Gardens mall, and invade people's conversations for 30 seconds. Punishment: Q is forced to pick his nose on the jumbo screen in front of a live audience of baseball stadium spectators.
| 16 | 16 | "Supercuts" | May 3, 2012 | All Jokers | 1.51 |
The guys utilize a variety of strange objects to mess with customers at a party supply store, put their nose on strangers at a restaurant, try to get signatures to create odd college clubs, and behave rudely at elevator etiquette. Punishment: The guys are forced to give each other gag haircuts in the first ever four-way punishment - Joe gets a mullet, Q gets bright red curls, Sal gets two bleached horns, and Murr's head is entirely shaved except for a little tuft at the front.

Punishment Count:

- Sal - 5 (including 4 way punishment in season finale)
- Joe - 5 (including 4 way punishment in season finale)
- Murr - 5 (including 4 way punishment in season finale)
- Q - 4 (including 4 way punishment in season finale)
