= Impractical Jokers =

American comedy television show

- Genre: Reality Hidden camera Cringe comedy
- Directed by: Yesenia "Moony" Perez (season 3); Andrew Hood (seasons 4–9); Various (seasons 1–2, 9–10); Mike Damiani (season 10–present)
- Starring: Brian "Q" Quinn; James "Murr" Murray; Sal Vulcano; Joe Gatto (seasons 1-9)
- Narrated by: Drew Patterson; Bill St. James; Erik Falcon
- Country of origin: United States
- Original language: English
- No. of seasons: 13
- No. of episodes: 294 (+46 specials) (list of episodes)

Production
- Executive producers: Charlie DeBevoise; Mark Hickman; Brian Quinn; James Murray; Sal Vulcano; Joe Gatto (seasons 1–9); Pete McPartland; Simmy Kustanowitz
- Production locations: New York; New Jersey
- Camera setup: Hidden camera
- Running time: 19–82 minutes
- Production company: NorthSouth Productions

Original release
- Network: TruTV
- Release: December 15, 2011 – April 6, 2024
- Network: TBS
- Release: February 9, 2023 – present

Related
- Impractical Jokers: Inside Jokes; Impractical Jokers: After Party; The Misery Index

Impractical Jokers is an American hidden camera and improv comedy show produced by NorthSouth Productions. It premiered on TruTV on December 15, 2011, starring the members of The Tenderloins: Brian "Q" Quinn, James "Murr" Murray, Sal Vulcano, and Joe Gatto, who left in December 2021. In March 2024, the series was relocated to TBS, which originally simulcast the tenth season, due to a programming network overhaul at truTV. Despite this, truTV continues to air reruns.

Impractical Jokers' thirteenth as well the current season premiered on July 23, 2026. A feature-length film for the show was theatrically released on February 21, 2020.

== Overview ==
Each episode of the series begins with a satirical content warning for viewers: "Warning: The following program contains scenes of graphic stupidity among lifelong friends who compete to embarrass each other." The warning refers to the four original cast members from the first season through the first half of season 9, before Gatto's departure.

In a typical episode, the cast members, collectively referred to as "Jokers", compete against each other in two or three games or challenges. The games usually involve one Joker, wearing a hidden earpiece, attempting to complete an embarrassing task while the others observe and direct the scenario from behind the scenes using covert surveillance equipment. The Jokers generally interact with unsuspecting members of the public, and the challenges rely heavily upon improvisation. The show's comedy employs dialogue, slapstick, and the humorous reactions of both the public and the Jokers.

Some challenges involve multiple Jokers competing simultaneously to reach a specified goal. In others, one Joker must follow instructions given by the others. Refusing to comply with an instruction ends the Jokers' turn and results in a loss for that challenge. At the end of each challenge, the Joker receives either a "thumbs-up" or "thumbs-down", indicating whether they completed the challenge successfully. Thumbs-downs received by the Jokers are recorded on the "loser board". In earlier seasons, some challenges were "double down" challenges, meaning losing jokers received two "thumbs-downs" instead of one.

After the final challenge, the Joker with the most thumbs-downs is declared the "big loser" and must undergo a punishment, typically involving a public or otherwise embarrassing situation that they cannot decline under penalty of being removed from the series. If two or more Jokers are tied for the most thumbs-downs, all of the tied Jokers receive the punishment.

== Development ==
Intertitle from Season 3 to the first half of Season 9. From left to right: Q, Murr, Sal, and Joe.

Joe Gatto, James "Murr" Murray, Brian "Q" Quinn, and Sal Vulcano are four friends and former classmates from Monsignor Farrell High School in Staten Island, New York. Gatto, Murray and Vulcano were original members of the live improv and sketch comedy troupe the Tenderloins in 1999. They transitioned to producing more comedy material on the internet, with Quinn replacing former Tenderloin Mike Boccio in 2006. In 2007, the Tenderloins won the $100,000 grand prize in NBC's It's Your Show competition.

In 2008, they filmed a pilot episode for a scripted sitcom for Spike TV, but the show did not go to series. TruTV announced Impractical Jokers, originally slated to be named Mission: Uncomfortable, on April 12, 2011, eight months before the show's debut. Murray explained how the hidden camera format made sense based on the jokesters' skills. "We needed to find the right format... thing is, we've been doing this for years, but when it's on camera, the embarrassment is amplified." Vulcano said "We wanted to utilize our improv strengths … put ourselves into a situation where we know we can be funny and also ourselves. If we’re ourselves and also showcase our friendship, something might resonate there." The concept of feeding each other lines using an earpiece was inspired from talk show host David Letterman feeding neighboring storeowner Rupert Jee lines on Late Show with David Letterman. Quinn and Vulcano have said when they gave their pilot episode to TruTV, it was recorded on their iPhones. At the time that they pitched the idea to TruTV, Murray was VP of Development for NorthSouth Productions, the company that has produced the series since its inception. Murray describes the show as an "upside-down hidden-camera show where the joke is on us, instead of the public. So it takes away the thing people hate about hidden-camera shows, which is, 'Oh, I feel bad for the people getting pranked.' We're messing with each other. The public is just there to witness our embarrassment."

On December 31, 2021, Joe Gatto announced on his Instagram that he would be leaving Impractical Jokers after nine seasons. Shortly thereafter, Quinn, on behalf of Murray and Vulcano, sent well wishes for Gatto and announced that Impractical Jokers would continue working despite Gatto's absence in 2022. Subsequently, Paste reported that TruTV and HBO Max had removed "several episodes featuring Gatto in compromising situations" from their platforms. On February 14, 2022, the show announced that the season would proceed with a lineup of various celebrity guests. On March 18, 2026, the show was renewed for a thirteenth season.

== Challenge format ==
Prior to every challenge, the Jokers explain where they are and what the challenge is. The cast member performing the prank often wears a hidden earpiece, while the remaining members dictate commands using a microphone in a covert location. Cameras are hidden near the area to capture the action. The challenge location is usually a public area in or around New York City such as a city park, or store. The criteria of each challenge remain the same for each participating Joker. If a Joker cannot or refuses to complete an instruction, they get a "thumbs-down". At the end of the episode, the Joker(s) with the most thumbs-down receives a punishment, which cannot be refused under penalty of being removed from the series.

== Episodes ==
Season	Episodes	Originally released		
Season	Episodes	First released	Last released	Network
1	16	December 15, 2011	May 3, 2012	truTV
2	28	September 6, 2012	December 12, 2013	truTV
3	31	January 2, 2014	October 30, 2014	truTV
4	26	January 29, 2015	October 22, 2015	truTV
5	26	February 11, 2016	November 3, 2016	truTV
6	26	February 9, 2017	November 2, 2017	truTV
7	26	February 1, 2018	December 6, 2018	truTV
8	26	March 28, 2019	March 5, 2020	truTV
9	26	February 4, 2021	August 4, 2022	truTV
10	21	February 9, 2023	July 18, 2024	truTV/TBS
11	19	July 25, 2024	March 20, 2025	TBS
12	18	July 10, 2025	March 20, 2026	TBS
13	TBA	July 23, 2026	TBA	TBS
Specials	46	February 2, 2012	N/A	truTV/TBS

As of the 2017–18 television season, the series is syndicated to American broadcast stations by Trifecta Entertainment & Media, with a clearance rate of 85% of television homes. Internationally, the series airs on Citytv in Canada, late nights on E4 in the UK and E.tv in South Africa.

== Cast ==
The current cast consists of three long-time friends, collectively on the show referred to as the "Jokers".

=== Main ===
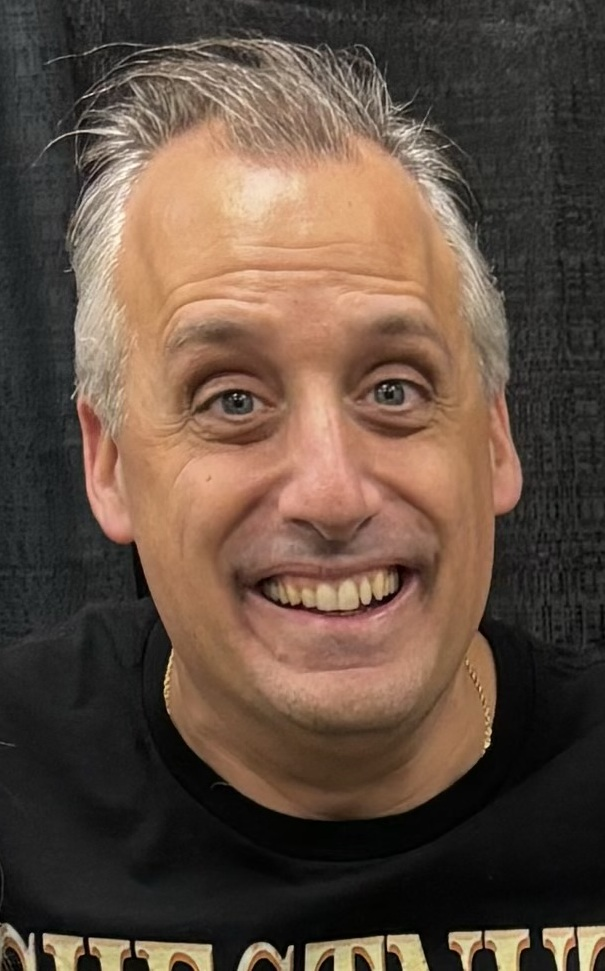
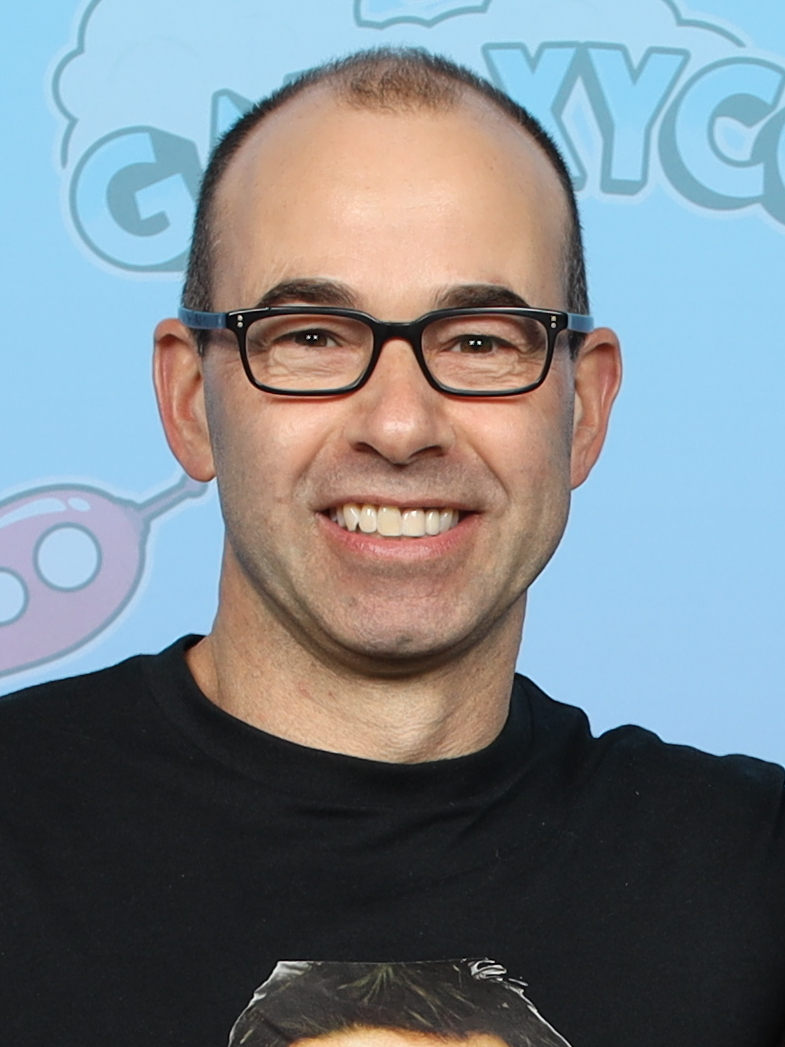
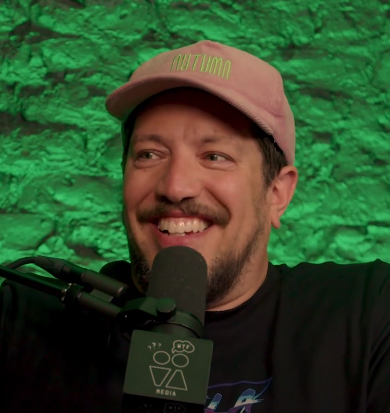
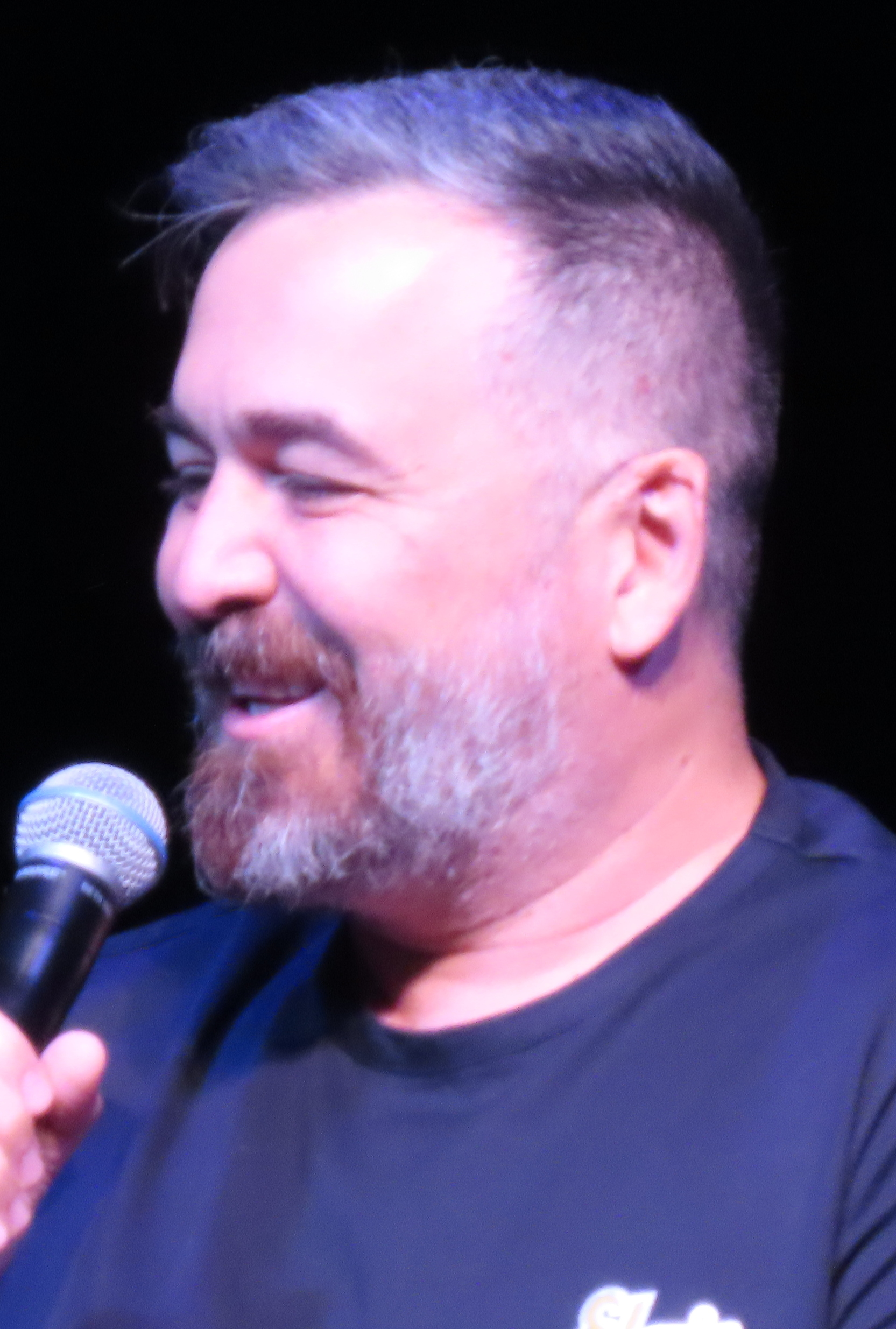
The original cast of the Impractical Jokers: Joe Gatto (former member; pictured 2024), James Murray (pictured 2025), Sal Vulcano (pictured 2023), Brian Quinn (pictured 2022)
- Brian "Q" Quinn is an improvisational comedian from the New York City borough of Staten Island. He attended Monsignor Farrell High School, where he was involved in numerous activities, including drama and sports. He attended Brooklyn College and later went on to join the New York City Fire Department. He is the third host of the podcast Tell 'Em Steve-Dave!, which was formerly on SModcast.com.
- James "Murr" Murray is an improvisational comedian from the New York City borough of Staten Island. He attended Monsignor Farrell High School there, and was also part of a community theatre. He continued his education at Georgetown University where he received a BA in English. He continues to work at NorthSouth Productions, where he is the Senior Vice President of Development. In 2018, he released a sci-fi/horror book called Awakened, which was co-written by Darren Wearmouth, and revolves around a monster that lives in the subways of New York City. Two sequels, called The Brink and Obliteration, were released on June 18, 2019, and June 23, 2020, respectively. He is married to Melyssa Davies.
- Sal Vulcano is an improvisational and stand-up comedian from the New York City borough of Staten Island. He earned a degree in Finance from St. John's University. Vulcano is also an ordained minister, and officiated Gatto's 2013 wedding. In May 2024, he revealed that he had married his longtime girlfriend and they had recently had a daughter.
- Joe Gatto (Seasons 1–9) is an improvisational comedian from the New York City borough of Staten Island, where he attended Monsignor Farrell High School. He studied at Long Island Post University where he received a degree in Accounting. He founded the Tenderloins comedy troupe in 1999 and worked at the baby retail store Giggle until January 2012. He is the first married Joker, and has two children with his wife Bessy. On December 31, 2021, Gatto announced on his Instagram that he was parting ways with the Tenderloins and Impractical Jokers to focus more on his personal life and family.

=== Notable special guests ===
- Rosie O'Donnell (Season 2)
- Dan Reynolds (Season 2)
- Wayne Sermon (Season 2)
- Joey Fatone (Seasons 3, 5–7, 10 & 12)
- Tommy Dreamer (Seasons 3 & 6)
- Iain Armitage (Note: Armitage's appearance was impromptu.) (Season 3)
- Soren Thompson (Season 4 & 7)
- Danica McKellar (Seasons 4 & 6–7)
- Byamba (Seasons 4 & 7)
- Grant Marshall (Season 4)
- Colin White (Season 4)
- Howie Mandel (Season 4)
- Rachel Sklar (Season 5)
- Alex Brightman (Season 5)
- James Buckley (Season 5)
- Travis Pastrana (Season 5)
- Kay Adams (Season 5)
- Gary Busey (Seasons 6–7)
- Bryan Johnson (Seasons 6–7)
- Bully Ray (Season 6)
- Velvet Sky (Season 6)
- Casey Jost (Season 6)
- Jesse Bravo (Season 6)
- Matthew Lewis (Season 6)
- Christopher John O'Neill (Season 6)
- Noah Syndergaard (Season 6)
- Kayla Harrison (Season 6-7)
- Australia's Thunder from Down Under (Season 7)
- Big Jay Oakerson (Season 7)
- Doug McDermott (Season 7)
- Enes Kanter (Season 7)
- Buddy Valastro (Season 7)
- Harry Connick Jr. (Season 7)
- Mike Spano (Season 7)
- Guy Fieri (Season 7)
- Carlos Peña (Season 7)
- Mark DeRosa (Season 7)
- Randy Couture (Season 7)
- Shawn Klush (Season 7)
- Tino Martinez (Season 7)
- David Zucker (Season 7)
- Tristin Mays (Season 8)
- Yanni (Season 8)
- Jay and Silent Bob (Season 8)
- Steel Panther (Season 8)
- Jeff Daniels (Season 8)
- Dave Jacobs (Note: Jacobs' appearance was impromptu.) (Season 8)
- Jameela Jamil (Season 9)
- Eric André (Seasons 9–10)
- Jillian Bell (Season 9)
- Chris Henchy (Season 9)
- Brooke Shields (Seasons 9 & 11)
- Colin Jost (Seasons 9 & 11)
- Rob Riggle (Season 9)
- Chris Jericho (Season 9)
- Adam Pally (Season 9)
- Jon Gabrus (Season 9)
- David Cross (Season 9)
- Method Man (Season 9)
- Bret Michaels (Season 10)
- Paul Rudd (Season 10)
- Post Malone (Season 10)
- Steve Byrne (Season 10)
- Anthony Davis (Season 10)
- John Mayer (Season 10)
- MJF (Season 10)
- Kesha (Season 10)
- Eddie Jackson (Season 10)
- Roy Wood Jr. (Season 10)
- Paul Scheer (Seasons 10–11)
- Kal Penn (Season 10)
- Rosanna Scotto (Season 10)
- Bruce Campbell (Season 10)
- Blake Anderson (Season 10)
- Bobby Moynihan (Season 10)
- Kim Fields (Season 10)
- Paula Abdul (Season 10)
- ALF (Season 10)
- Michael Ian Black (Season 10)
- Harvey Guillén (Season 10 & 13)
- Matt Long (Season 10)
- Adam Ray (Season 11–present)
- John Silver (Season 11)
- Joe DeRosa (Season 11)
- Terry Matalas (Season 11)
- Jax (Season 11)
- Richard Kind (Season 11)
- Jenna Wolfe (Season 11)
- Jess King (Season 11)
- Ally Love (Season 11)
- Tyler Hoechlin (Season 12)
- Lou Ferrigno (Season 12)
- Justin Long (Season 12)
- Teddy Swims (Season 12)
- Rachel Feinstein (Season 12)
- The Potash Twins (Season 12)
- Dan Finnerty (Season 12)
- Brad Meltzer (Season 12)
- Alyssa Milano (Season 13)

Impractical Jokers staff have also made appearances:

- Casey Jost hosts the Inside Jokes segments, and some of the behind-the-scenes antics.
- Rob Emmer is a production assistant and actor that appears in some of the challenges in different roles.
- Joe Imburgio is a producer on the show, and appears in some of the challenges and behind-the-scenes antics.

== International versions ==
- A British version of Impractical Jokers began airing in winter 2012 on BBC Three. It starred comedians Paul McCaffrey, Joel Dommett, Marek Larwood and Roisin Conaty. The pilot was filmed and placed online as part of "The Comedy Kitchen" in 2012. The first series included six episodes, which aired from November 15 to December 20, 2012. The second series also included six episodes, and aired from February 24 to April 2, 2014. It was produced by Yalli Productions. It was cancelled after Series 2 in April 2014, mainly due to its unpopularity. However, more recently, Comedy Central and Channel 5 picked up the rights to co-produce a third season of Impractical Jokers UK with Yalli Productions, starring Late Night Gimp Fight. It aired from 2016 to 2017.
- A Dutch version was broadcast on Veronica TV in 2012, called De Fukkers. In 2015 a new version started at RTL 5, named Foute Vrienden. The series ran for 5 seasons, ending in 2019. A third All-Female version started in 2018 called Foute Vriendinnen.
- A Belgian (Flemish) version broadcast on 2BE in the fall of 2012, titled Foute Vrienden. James Murray appeared in episode 5 of the first season. The second season, which started in March 2014, included 10 episodes.
- A Brazilian version was broadcast on SBT titled Amigos da Onça. The series premiere aired on January 7, 2013 and ended on August 13, 2013. James Murray appeared in episode 3 of the second season.
- A Lebanese version was broadcast on Al Jadeed in the fall of 2013.
- A Mexican version broadcast on TBS Latin America started on May 20, 2015 with the title Impractical Jokers.
- A Greek version was broadcast on Ant1 in February 2014 with the title Wanted.
- A Canadian French version was broadcast on V on February 24, 2014 with the title Les Jokers.
- A Swedish version was broadcast on TV6 in April 2014 with the title Radiostyrd.
- A Spanish version was broadcast on Neox in 2014 with the title Sinvergüenzas.
- An Egyptian version was released in 2015 with the title Al Mohayesoun.
- A Russian version was broadcast on Che in 2018 and 2019 with the title Shutniki (Шутники)
- An Australian version starring comedy duo The Inspired Unemployed (Matt Ford and Jack Steele), along with Dom Littrich and Liam Moore, premiered August 9, 2023 on Network 10 and Paramount+, with the title The Inspired Unemployed (Impractical) Jokers.
- The Lithuanian version of the show premiered in 2025 on TV3 called "Niekdariai". After the first season ended in 2026 TV6 has started airing the Australian version of the show

== Critical reception ==
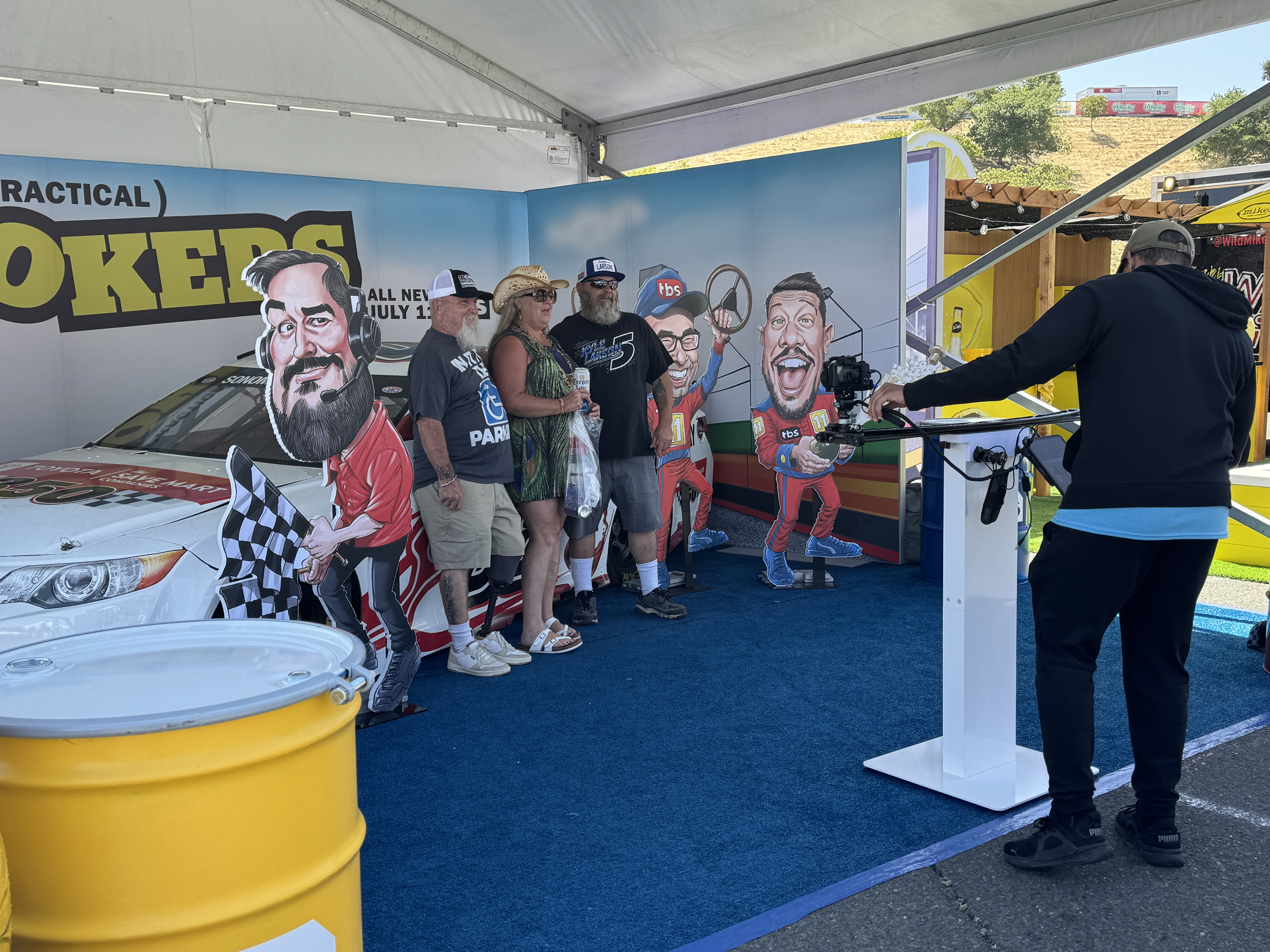
Fans take a photo with cardboard cutouts of the Impractical Jokers at the 2024 Toyota/Save Mart 350 in Sonoma, California.

Impractical Jokers has been well received by most critics, with Linda Stasi of the New York Post calling it "possibly the funniest, most ridiculous show I've seen in years".

While it has been compared to earlier hit prank shows such as Candid Camera and Jackass, critics have offered praise for its unique twist on the genre, wherein the stars' reactions to the pranks are often equally as humorous as those of the innocent bystanders. Neil Genzlinger of The New York Times stated that "the gag pays off twice: once in the reaction of the unsuspecting passer-by, once in the discomfort of the fellow doing the asking". He later wrote that the cast-members' occasional integrity "[kept] these four clowns a little bit lovable". Dean Robbins of The Daily Page echoed this sentiment, stating that "the friends are jovial rather than Jackass-obnoxious, even rejecting some dares as too offensive".

The series has been generally well received, garnering 1.5 million viewers during its December 15, 2011, premiere. Following the series move to TBS in March 2024, the show has obtained a significant boost in viewership gaining series high ratings in multiple age demographics.

The review of the show by Variety's Brian Lowry was less positive, ending with this statement: "Nobody will ever confuse Impractical Jokers with high art, certainly, but as low-brow, micro-cost comedy in the context of truTV's programming resources, it's actually quite practical—and occasionally funny".

On February 6, 2023, the borough of Staten Island officially declared the first Monday of every February "Impractical Jokers Day" in honor of the tenth season of the show.

In 2018, the Impractical Jokers was nominated for a Golden Trailer Award in the Most Innovative Advertising (For a TV Series / Streaming Series) category. The series also won in the Best Comedy/Game Show category at the 2021 MTV Movie & TV Awards.

== Spin-offs ==
=== Jokers Wild ===
Jokers Wild was a spin-off of the original series featuring scripted sketches rather than the Jokers' standard hidden-camera formats. These segments focus on narrative storytelling as opposed to live interactions with the public. The first episode of Jokers Wild aired on September 25, 2014. Four episodes of the six that were filmed for this series were aired on truTV. The show was then cancelled as it did not do well in the ratings.

=== Impractical Jokers: Inside Jokes ===
Impractical Jokers: Inside Jokes is a spin-off of Impractical Jokers in which episodes that have already aired are shown again with pop-up annotations throughout. These graphics include behind-the-scenes anecdotes, production trivia, and commentary provided directly from the Jokers. The first episode of Impractical Jokers: Inside Jokes aired on July 14, 2016, following the mid-season British special.

=== Impractical Jokers: After Party ===
Impractical Jokers: After Party is an aftershow hosted by Joey Fatone, in which the Jokers and surprise guests go through a deep dive of challenges, special play-by-play punishment analysis from the latest episode, and bonus content from the latest episode or the whole show. The first episode of the series aired on August 3, 2017, after the episode "The Q-Pay" had aired. After Party is filmed at The Flagship Brewing Company bar in Staten Island. When the series came back on August 2, 2018, the series moved to The Mailroom Bar in Lower Manhattan. Due to there not being an episode since August 2022, the show is presumed cancelled.

=== Impractical Jokers: Dinner Party ===
Impractical Jokers: Dinner Party is a spin-off of Impractical Jokers, in which the Jokers do a video group chat while eating dinner and having guests visit one or more participants. The spin-off was created in response to the COVID-19 pandemic in the United States that prevented Impractical Jokers episodes from being produced. The show's theme song is "Uzi (Pinky Ring)" by Wu-Tang Clan. The first episode of the series aired on May 21, 2020. On August 5, 2020, the series was ordered 10 additional episodes and began airing on October 15, 2020. The first season ended on January 14, 2021. At the end of the episode, "Don't Stop Believin" by Journey played to commence the return of regular episodes.

== Film ==
On March 7, 2018, truTV announced that Impractical Jokers was renewed for an eighth season and a feature-length film to begin development in spring 2018, directed by Chris Henchy and produced by Funny or Die. Production on the film began at the end of April 2018. A trailer was released on December 17, 2019, and the movie was released on February 21, 2020.

== Other media ==
Since 2012, the group have held numerous Impractical Jokers performance tours in both the US and the UK. The shows consist of the group telling stories combined with on stage bits and an audience interaction. The "DRIVE DRIVE DRIVE DRIVE DRIVE Tour" which took place in 2023, marked the first tour to not feature Joe Gatto however he did make a guest appearance at their show in Boston, Massachusetts which took place in May.

From 2016 to 2020, the Impractical Jokers hosted their own comedy cruise aboard Norwegian Cruise Lines which went from Miami, Florida to The Bahamans. In 2024, the cruise returned in collaboration with Eric Andre.

TruTV and Built Games developed a mobile game called Impractical Jokers: Wheel of Doom, released in 2018. Wilder Games developed a party game series including Impractical Jokers: Box of Challenges and Impractical Jokers: Ultimate Challenge Pack that were released in 2020.

In 2019, the toy company Mego Corporation released an official line of retro-style action figures featuring all four members of the show.

The Official Impractical Jokers Podcast started in 2017, hosted by producers Casey Jost and James McCarthy. Episodes are usually released the day after new episodes have broadcast. Assistant director and producer Chá DeBerry joined the podcast as a host in 2021.
