= Pitango =

Israeli venture capital fund

Pitango VC
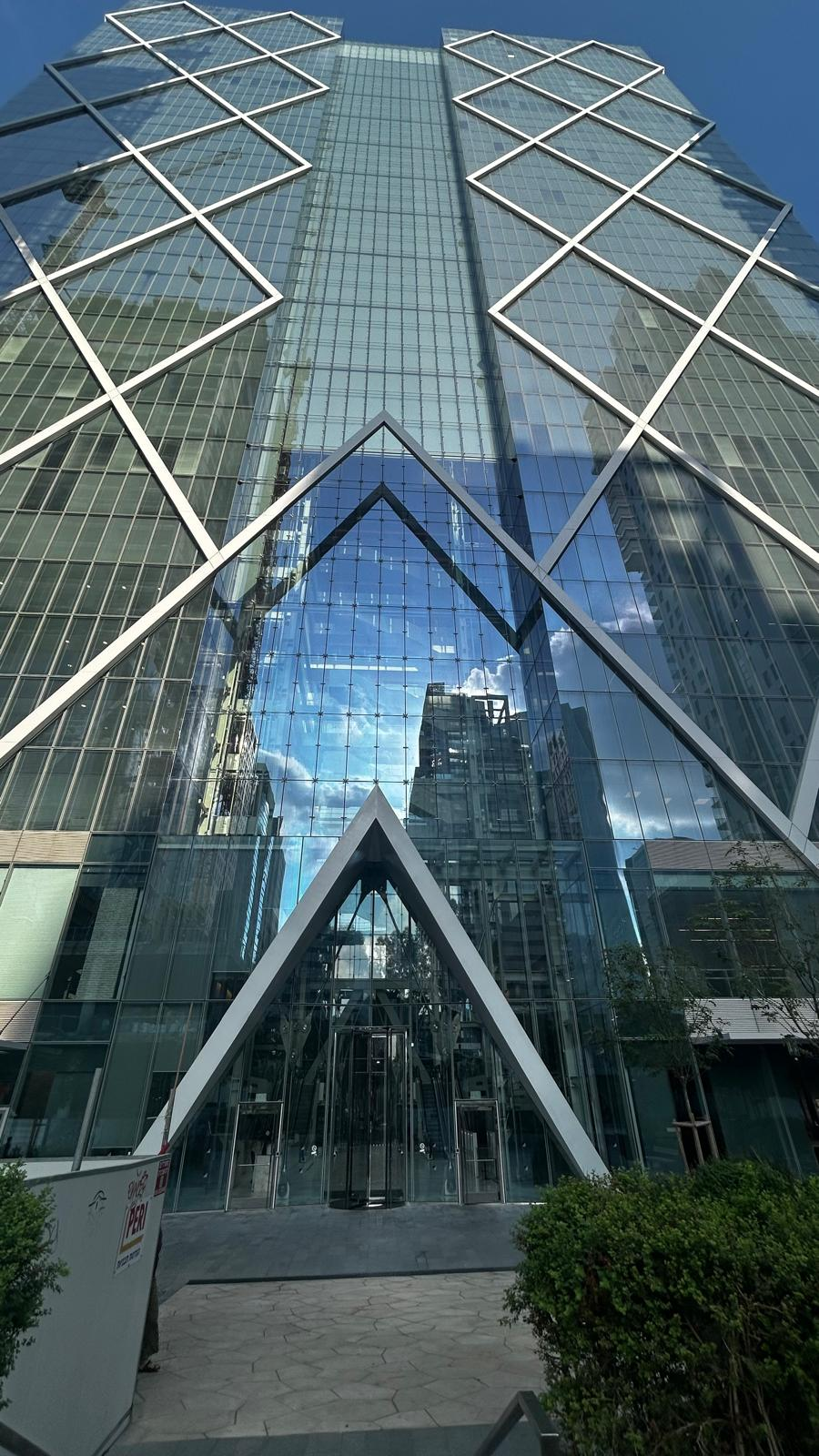
- Pitango offices at Landmark TLV, Tel Aviv
- Type: Private
- Industry: Venture capital
- Founded: 1993; 33 years ago
- Founder: Rami Kalish and Chemi Peres
- Headquarters: Tel Aviv, Israel
- AUM: USD $3 billion
- Number of employees: ~40
- Website: www.pitango.com

Pitango VC, established in 1993, is Israel’s largest and longest standing venture capital fund with over US$3 billion under management as of 2025, with a recent vintage in 2020 of US$750M making it the largest venture group in Israel.

Headquartered in Tel Aviv, Israel (Sarona) Pitango has raised 14 venture funds, invested in more than 300 companies and accomplished over 90 companies becoming publicly traded in NASDAQ and NYSE or acquired by strategic players such as Google, Apple, IBM, Cisco. Investors are institutional and strategic investors from the US, Europe, Japan, and SouthEast Asia and have included Time Warner, Citigroup, Eastman Kodak, Deutsche Bank and HarbourVest Partners.

Pitango VC invests through three dedicated funds, Pitango First (early-stage investments), Pitango HealthTech (HealthTech investments), and Pitango Growth (growth investments).

Notable successful investments made by the firm include Via Transportation, DriveNets, AppsFlyer, Forescout, and Varonis.

== Domains of investment ==
Pitango invests in a wide range of technology and innovation-driven sectors. These include deep technology fields such as generative AI, quantum computing, and cybersecurity, as well as infrastructure-focused areas like cloud computing, DevOps, and enterprise infrastructure. Pitango is also active in financial technology (FinTech) and TransitTech, reflecting its interest in modernizing financial services and urban mobility solutions. In the healthcare sector, Pitango supports ventures in digital health, medical devices, and biotechnology. Additionally, the firm invests in companies operating in sales and marketing technologies, as well as retail and eCommerce platforms.

== History ==
The fund was founded as Polaris Venture Capital in 1993 by Rami Kalish. In 1996, Kalish was joined by Chemi Peres, son of former Israeli president Shimon Peres, to create Polaris Fund II, which raised more than $100 million. Polaris II invested in 35 high-tech companies.

In 2001, Polaris Venture Capital changed its name to Pitango Venture Capital to avoid confusion with Boston-based Polaris Venture Partners. Although the Boston firm was founded in 1996, which was after Pitango was founded, the Israeli firm decided to change its name. Pitango takes its name from the semi-wild Surinam Cherry that grows in Israel.

Since then, the company has grown to include 14 partners, a value-add team, an operations and support team, and venture partners.

== Notable companies ==
- AppsFlyer
- Formlabs
- Via Transportation, Inc.
- DriveNets
- AI21 Labs
- Finout
- Tomorrow.io
- QuantHealth
- Laguna
- Quantum Source
- PsiQuantum
- Protai
- StreamElements
- Masterschool
- D-iD
- Connie Health
- Riskified

== Notable exits and IPOs ==
Company	Industry	Description	Initial Investment Date	Exit/IPO
Taboola	Advertising Tech	Content recommendation platform	2011	IPO on NASDAQ in 2021.
Riskified	E-Commerce / SaaS	Fraud prevention platform using ML-powered chargeback guarantee	2017	IPO on NYSE in 2021.
Vertos Medical	Medical devices	Minimally invasive lumbar spinal stenosis treatment	2013	Acquired by Stryker Corporation in 2024.
Skycure Ltd	Mobile cybersecurity (MTD)	Mobile Threat Defense platform based on AI/ML	2017	Acquired by Symantec in July 2017.
Forescout	Cybersecurity	Agentless IoT and enterprise device visibility & control platform	2001	IPO on NASDAQ in 2017.
Varonis Systems	Data Security / SaaS	Data security platform analyzing unstructured enterprise data (UBA)	2014	IPO on NASDAQ in 2014.
Anobit	Semiconductors	flash memory controllers	2006	Acquired by Apple Inc. in 2012 for a reported $390 million.
Traiana	Software	Post-trade processing, client servicing, and trading partner integration for financial institutions	2004	Acquired by ICAP in 2007 for $247 million.
InstallFree	Software	Application virtualization technology	2006	In December 2012, WatchDox Acquired InstallFree.
ClearForest	Software	Brokerage compliance, anti-money laundering, and fraud prevention	2001	Acquired by Reuters in 2007 for $25 Million.
Radcom Ltd	Communications	Networking Infrastructure Equipment	1993	IPO on NASDAQ in 1997.
Boxee	Consumer electronics		2007	Acquired by Samsung Electronics in 2013 for $30 million.
Check, Inc.	Mobile	Mobile Applications	2007	Acquired by Intuit in 2014 for $360 million.
AeroScout Industrial	Communications	RFID	2000	Acquired by Stanley Black & Decker in 2012.
BioLineRx	Biotechnology		2003	IPO on the Tel Aviv Stock Exchange.
dbMotion	Software	Health technology interoperability	2005	Acquired by Allscripts in 2013 for $235 million.
Mainsoft	Software	Network virtualization for software testing	1993	
VocalTec	Telecommunication	VocalTec released the first Voice over Internet Protocol application	1993	IPO on NASDAQ in 1996.
Red Bend Software	Software	Mobile software management	2000	Acquired by Harman International Industries in 2015.
Radware	Communications	Advertising Data	1997	IPO on NASDAQ in 1999.
EarlySense	Medical Technology	Medical device company	2004	IP acquired by Hillrom in 2021 for $30 million plus revenue share.
Graphcore	Semiconductor / AI chips	AI processors (IPU systems)	2016	Acquired by SoftBank in 2024.
Zerto	Software / Disaster recovery	Cloud disaster recovery & data protection platform	2018	Acquired by Hewlett Packard Enterprise in 2021.
Celeno	Semiconductors / Communications	Wi-Fi chipsets and solutions	2007	Acquired by Renesas in 2021.
TScan	Biotechnology	T cell therapies for cancer	2019	IPO on NASDAQ in 2021.
Optimal Plus	Software / Analytics	Big Data analytics for semiconductor & electronics mfg.	2007	Acquired by National Instruments in 2020.
LiveU	Video technology	Live video transmission over cellular networks	2019	Acquired by Carlyle Group in 2021.
Voltaire	Networking	InfiniBand and Ethernet switch solutions	2017	IPO on NASDAQ in 2017.
Leaba	Semiconductors	Networking semiconductors	2016	Acquired by Cisco in 2016.
SuperDimension	Medical devices	Minimally invasive pulmonary devices	2012	Acquired by Covidien in 2012.
SuperDerivatives	FinTech / Software	Derivatives pricing & risk management software	2014	Acquired by Intercontinental Exchange in 2014.
Borderfree	E-Commerce	Cross-border e-commerce solutions	2014	IPO on NASDAQ in 2014.
Provigent Inc	Semiconductors	System-on-Chip for broadband wireless backhaul	2011	Acquired by Broadcom in 2011.
Mobile Access Inc.	Telecommunications	In-building wireless solutions	2011	Acquired by Corning in 2011.
Convergin	Telecommunications	Service broker for telecom networks	2010	Acquired by Oracle in 2010.
Jinko Solar	Renewable energy	Solar panel manufacturer	2014	IPO on NYSE in 2014.
Dune Networks	Semiconductors	Network processors	2009	Acquired by Broadcom in 2009.
Optonol	Medical devices	Glaucoma treatment devices	2009	Acquired by Alcon in 2009.
Ventor	Medical devices	Transcatheter heart valves	2009	Acquired by Medtronic in 2009.
Disc-O-Tech	Medical devices	Minimally invasive orthopedic devices	2006	Acquired by Kyphon in 2006.
Colbar	Biotechnology	Tissue engineering and aesthetics	2006	Acquired by Johnson & Johnson in 2006.
Phonetic	Software / Speech tech	Voice recognition technologies	2004	Acquired by Nuance in 2004.
Radlan	Networking software	Ethernet switching software	2003	Acquired by Marvell in 2003.
Audiocodes	Telecommunications	VoIP and networking solutions	1999	IPO on NASDAQ in 1999.
Card Guard	Medical devices	Remote patient monitoring	1999	IPO on Zurich SWX in 1999.
BackWeb	Software	Push technology software	1999	IPO on NASDAQ in 1999.
ITXC	Telecommunications	Global VoIP network operator	1999	IPO on NASDAQ in 1999.
Optibase	Video technology	Digital video streaming solutions	1999	IPO on NASDAQ in 1999.
Retalix	Software / Retail tech	Retail and supply chain management software	1997	IPO on NASDAQ in 1997.
Medinol	Medical devices	Coronary stents	1995	Acquired by Boston Scientific in 1995.
