= Hanny Nahmias =

Israeli actress

- חני נחמיאס
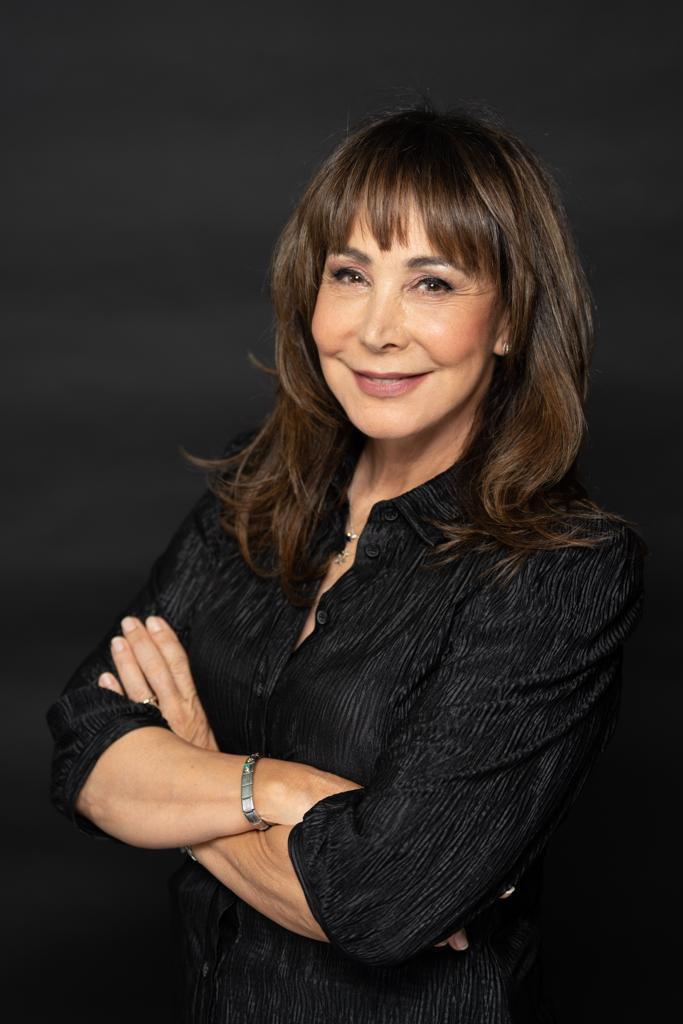
- Born: Hannah Nahmias; 9 April 1959 (age 67); Tel Aviv, Israel
- Occupations: Actress; comedian; television presenter; singer; writer
- Years active: 1970–present
- Spouses: Tzvi Steinmetz (m. 1983; died 1993) Meir Azouri (m. 1999; div. 2021)

Hanny Nahmias (Hebrew: חני נחמיאס; born 9 April 1959) is an Israeli actress, voice actress, comedian, television presenter, singer, children's entertainer and author. She served as a member of the Ramat Gan City Council, from 2008 to 2012.

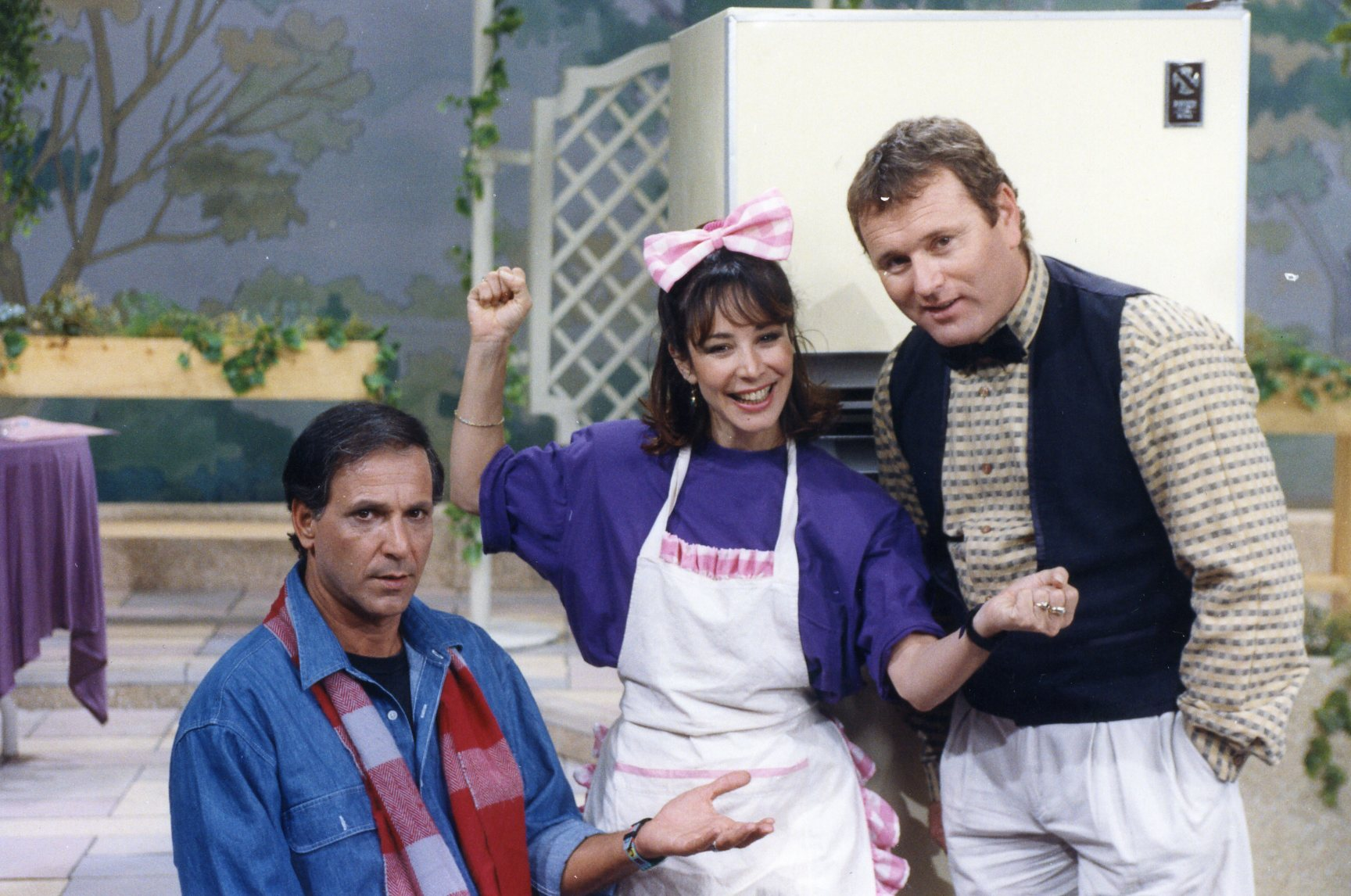
Nahimas with Oshik Levi and Natan Nathanson on the IET show Bli Sodot.

== Biography ==
Nachmias was born in Tel Aviv to Yaakov and Pnina Nachmias and grew up in Givatayim. Her family is from Thessaloniki, Greece. Her cousin is the politician Ayelet Nahmias-Verbin. Her family are from Thessaloniki, Greece. During her childhood, Nachmias performed in the "Sadikov Choir", and in "The Wizard of Oz Theater" by Avraham Luria as a child prodigy, where she starred as Hanale in the play "Hanale's Sabbath Dress", and even participated as a child in the film "I Am a Jerusalemite", released in 1971 and directed by Yehoram Gaon, in the scene for the song "Minister Moshe Montefiore".

Nachmias was a member of the Borochov branch of the Working and Studying Youth in Givatayim, and she completed her high school studies at "ORT Technikum" in the city. In 1978, she enlisted in the IDF and initially served for about three months as an operations clerk and draftsman in the Golani Brigade. Subsequently, Nachmias moved to the IDF Choir and later to the Nahal Band, participating in four entertainment programs, some directed by Hanan Goldblatt. She was among the performers of "Song for Peace" on the television program "30 Years of Song on the IDF", broadcast from the IDF base in Julis on the 30th anniversary of Israel's independence.

== Personal life ==
During her high school studies, Nachmias was in a relationship with Chemi Peres, the son of Shimon Peres. After enlisting in the IDF, she entered into a relationship with Goni Hernik.

In 1983, Nachmias married Tzvi (Tzvika) Steinmetz, a divorcee and father of one; together, they had two children, a son and a daughter. Steinmetz died on August 25, 1993, from complications relating to diabetes.

From 1994 to 1996, Nachmias was in a relationship with singer Aharon Ferrera. On September 9, 1999, Nachmias married for the second time, to Meir Azouri, a divorcee and father of three children. The couple divorced in 2021. Since 2023, Nachmias has been in a relationship with singer Yehuda Elias.

== Books for children and youth ==
- Sandwich Girl (1994), children
- Shalom Shalom to the World (1994), children
- This Book (1996), children
- Teen Secrets series (2007–2001), youth
- This Book – New Edition (2000), children
- Cat Buli Learns Opposites (2002), children
- Cat Buli Knows the Body (2002), children
- Cat Buli Dresses Alone (2002), children
- Cat Buli Bathes Alone (2002), children
- The End of the Pacifier (2005), children
- The Piggy Bank Behind the Sock Drawer (2011), children

== Publications ==
- Sodot neʻurim 2 : ahavot mistoriyot, 2001
- ha-Ḳupah she-meʼaḥore megerat ha-garbayim, 2011

== See also ==
- Uzi Hitman
- Bli Sodot
