= Uzi Peres =

Israeli film director (1951–1992)

- עוזי פרס
- Born: Uziel Shlomo Peres; 21 February 1951; Geneva, Switzerland
- Died: 31 July 1992 (aged 41); Kathmandu, Nepal
- Education: New Sorbonne; Tel Aviv University
- Occupations: Film director; film producer; screenwriter
- Years active: 1974–1992
- Children: 3
- Relatives: Shimon Peres (uncle); Tsvia Walden (cousin); Chemi Peres (cousin); Lauren Bacall (second cousin once removed)

Uziel Shlomo "Uzi" Peres (Hebrew: עוזיאל שלמה "עוזי" פרס; 21 February 1951 – 31 July 1992) was an Israeli film director, screenwriter and film producer.

== Early life ==
Uzi Peres was born in Geneva, Switzerland on 21 February 1951 and raised in Tel Aviv. His father, Gershon "Gigi" Peres (1925–2011), was a building contractor, and the younger brother of future Prime Minister and President of Israel, Shimon Peres. His mother, Carmela Keyla Peres, was an athlete.

He went to Ironi Dalet High School in Tel Aviv, and then served in the Israeli Defence Force and fought in the Yom Kippur War. After being discharged, he studied Film at Tel Aviv University and the New Sorbonne in Paris.

== Film career ==
Peres began his career with The Wait, a short 16mm film made in Israel in 1974. He continued to work in France, making three more short 16mm works: Choisir (1975), Cathédrales (1976), which won first prize at the short film festival in Le Raincy, and Sans Draps (1977). He also worked as an editor on Frédéric Rossif's film La Fête Sauvage (The Wild Nation, 1976) and television series L'Opéra sauvage (1975–1981).

Returning to Israel in 1977, Peres became a founding member of Kayitz, also known as the Young Israeli Cinema group, with other filmmakers including Nissim Dayan, Nadav Levitan, Rachel and Yehuda Ne'eman, and Renen Schorr. The group published a manifesto in Kolnoa magazine, insisting that they shared no single ideology or aesthetic principles, but were united by their search of an innovative Israeli film language. Responding to the government's preference to support other arts ahead of cinema, they suggested that Israeli films should be produced with small crews and low budgets, but they also lobbied for increased funding for non-commercial cinema, which led to the foundation of the Fund for the Encouragement of Original Quality Films in 1978. He only made one more short in Israel, however – 1978's Hand Exercises, which won a Best Actor award at an Israeli short film competition.

Peres returned to France to make his first feature films: Pareil pas pareil (1978), L'amour mensonge (1979) and Shadow of a Game (1980). The first he directed in Israel was First Love (1982), produced by his sister, Ruth. Here, Yitzhak (played by Hanan Goldblatt) leaves his kibbutz during a midlife crisis and returns to his first love, Ziva (Gila Almagor), now aged 40 with two teenage children, with inevitable complications for all involved. His final film, Me and My Wife's Lover, was also made in Israel and produced by Ruth Peres, and released in 1983.

== Death ==
Peres died aged 41 on 31 July 1992, when he was one of 113 people killed on Thai Airways International Flight 311 that crashed into a hillside whilst trying to make a bad weather landing in Kathmandu. He left a wife, Bracha, and three children, Sara, David and Michael. Together with the Israel Film and Television Directors Association, the Peres family established an annual prize in Uzi's name, awarded in conjunction with the Tel Aviv Cinematheque, to the director of an outstanding short film.

A plaque dedicates to Peres at Tel Aviv Cinematheque includes a quote from one of his early films, Pareil pas pareil (1978), which reads: "I would like to be able to turn every moment of life into a celebration, to build memorials to everything beautiful, to all that exists ... in order to preserve and endlessly multiply all that a dream allows."

== Filmography ==
=== Director ===
- ההמתנה / The Wait (1974, short)
- Choisir (1975, short)
- Cathédrales / Cathedrals (1976, short)
- Sans draps / Without Sheets (1977, short)
- תרגילי ידיים / Hand Exercises (1978, short)
- Pareil pas pareil (1978)
- L'Amour mensonge / Lying Love (1979)
- Ombre d'un jeu / Shadow of a Game (1980)
- אהבה ראשונה / First Love (1982)
- אני והמאהב של אשתי / Me and My Wife's Lover (1983)

== See also ==
- Cinema of Israel
- Visual arts in Israel
