= Tom Mendoza =

American business executive (born 1950)

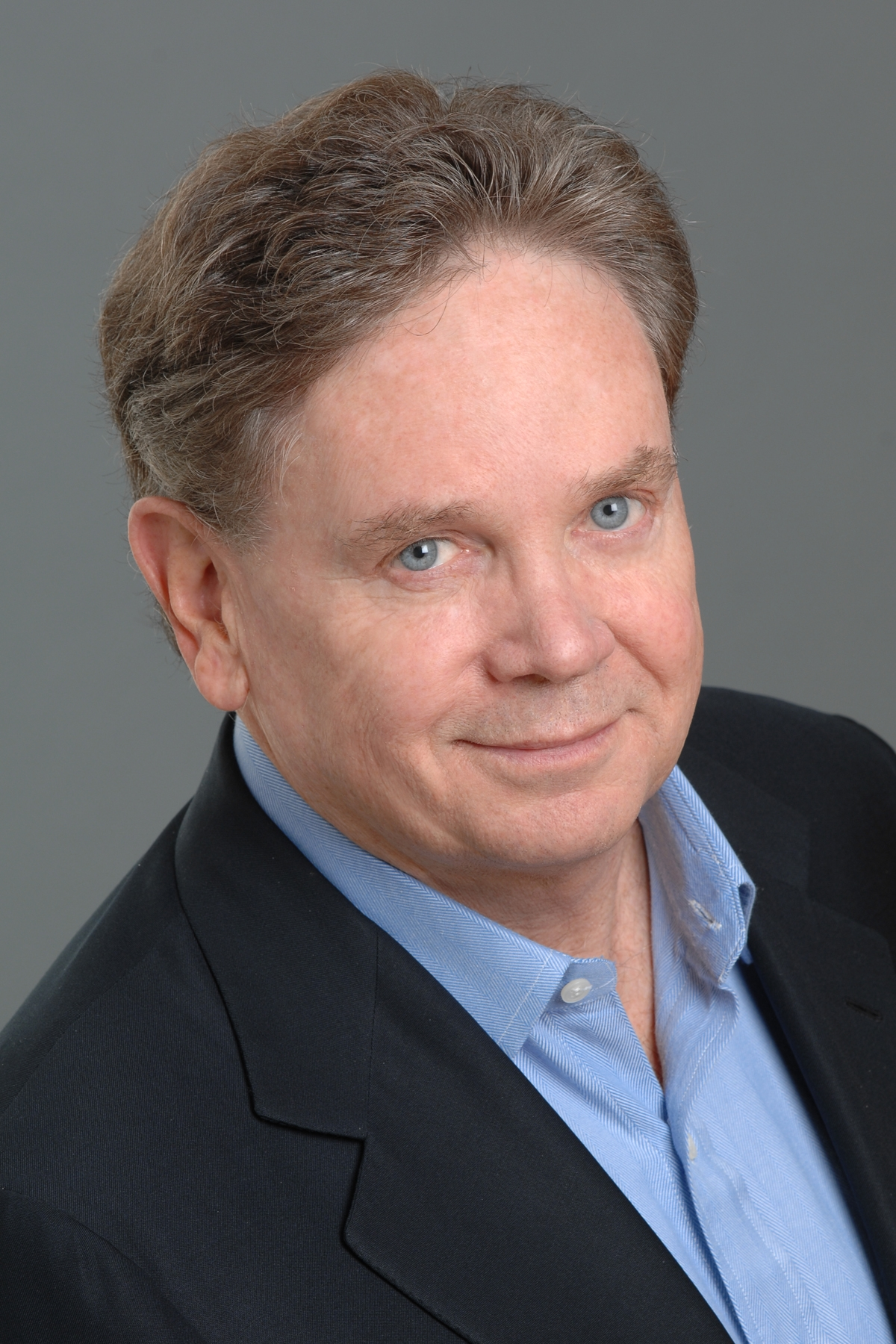
- Mendoza, 2012
- Born: November 21, 1950 (age 75)
- Education: Notre Dame
- Occupations: Former President and Vice Chairman NetApp
- Board member of: Varonis Systems, VAST Data, Consulting IQ
- Spouse: Tai Mendoza

Tom Mendoza (born November 21, 1950) is an American business executive and public speaker. He is the former president and Vice Chairman of NetApp.

== Career ==
Mendoza joined NetApp in 1994 as Vice President of North America sales. He served as its president from 2000 until 2008, when he became Vice Chairman.

Mendoza helped establish the culture that allowed NetApp to be ranked #1 in Fortune Magazine’s "100 Best Companies To Work For" in 2009. as well as being a co-recipient with NetApp CEO, Dan Warmenhovenof, of the Morgan Stanley Leadership Award for Global Commerce —the first time the award had been co-presented to two individuals.

Mendoza retired from NetApp in 2019 and currently serves on the Boards of Varonis Systems, VAST Data, and Consulting IQ. He previously served on the Boards of UiPath, ServiceSource, Infoblox, NetScreen (acquired by Juniper Networks), and Rhapsody Networks (acquired by Brocade).

Mendoza frequently speaks on corporate culture and leadership to a wide variety of audiences which have included as Stanford University, where he has been a guest lecturer since 1997, Notre Dame, Harvard and the United States Military Academy as well as to the United States Marine Corps, keynotes at Oracle World and numerous other industry events.

=== Philanthropy ===
Charities that Mr. Mendoza has been significantly involved with include the Pat Tillman Foundation, St. Baldrick's Foundation, the Navy SEAL Foundation and Justin Tuck's RUSH Foundation for Children's literacy. Mr. Mendoza also served on the Justin Tuck RUSH Foundation for Children's Literacy.

== Personal life ==
Tom's wife is Tai Mendoza. Tom holds a BA from the University of Notre Dame and is an alumnus of the Stanford Executive Program (SEP). In September 2000, the university named their business school the Mendoza College of Business after a $35 million endowment from Tom and ex-wife Kathy.
