= Contact centre =

Contact centre may refer to:

- Contact centre, an extension of a call centre supporting additional communication channels beyond voice, such as text based chat.
- Child contact centre, a centre for children to maintain contact with an absent parent

== See also ==
- Contact center telephony
