= Chemi Peres =

Israeli technology entrepreneur

- חמי פרס
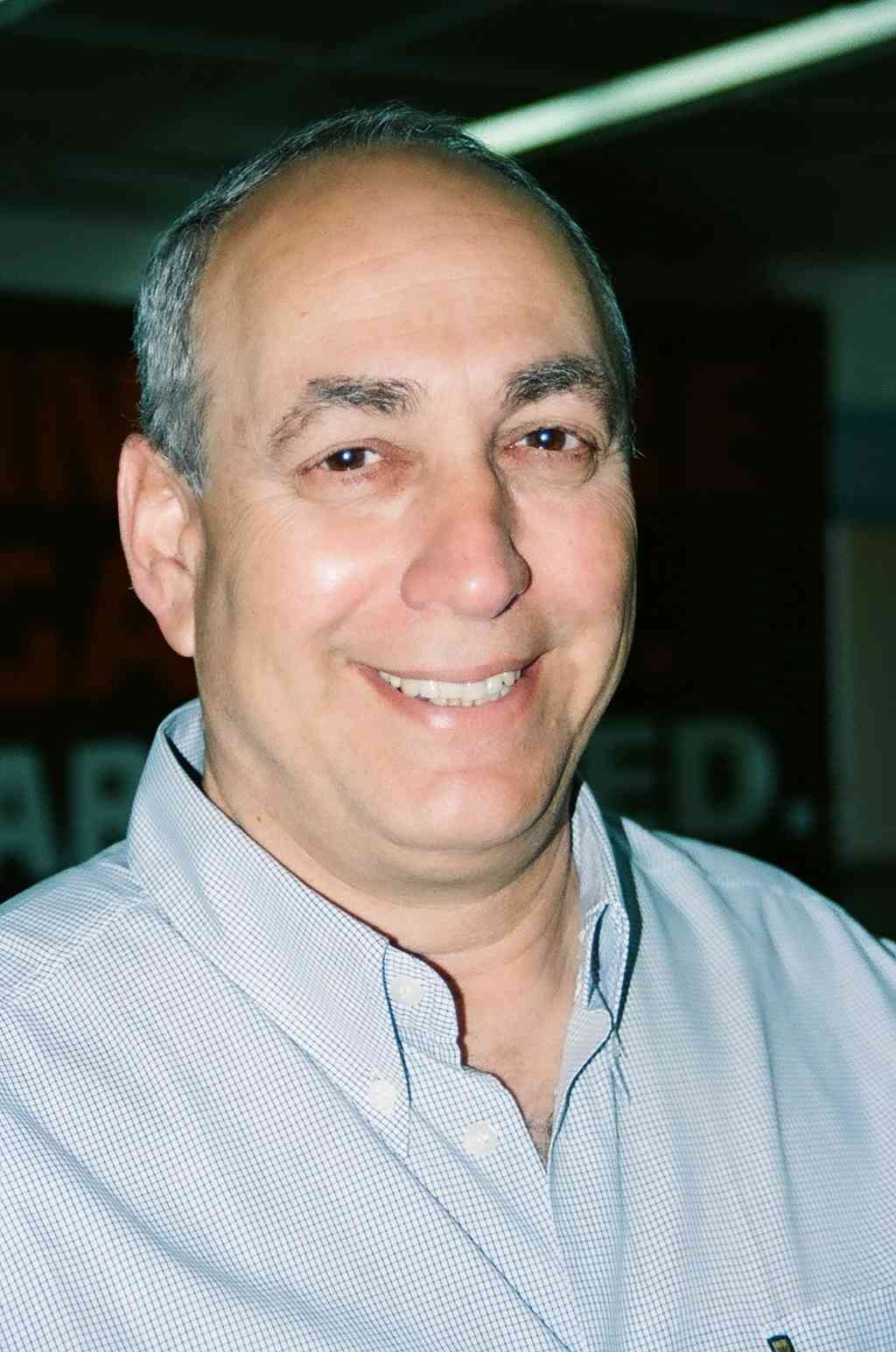
- Peres in 2009
- Born: Nechemia Jacob Peres; July 17, 1958 (age 68); Tel Aviv, Israel
- Education: Tel Aviv University
- Occupations: Technology entrepreneur, businessperson
- Years active: 1986–present
- Known for: Co-Founder and Managing General Partner of Pitango
- Title: Managing General Partner of Pitango Venture Capital; Chairman of Peres Center for Peace and Innovation
- Board member of: Via Transportation; Taboola; Venn.city; Radwin; Duda; Teva Pharmaceuticals; Idomoo; (in the past) Aladdin Knowledge Systems; AudioCodes; BackWeb; Koor Industries; Precise Software; VocalTec
- Spouse: Gila Peres
- Children: 3
- Parents: Shimon Peres (father); Sonia Gelman (mother)
- Relatives: Tsvia Walden (sister); Uzi Peres (cousin); Lauren Bacall (second cousin once removed)
- Website: www.chemiperes.com

Nechemia Jacob "Chemi" Peres (Hebrew: נחמיה יעקב "חמי" פרס; born July 17, 1958) is a venture capital and high-tech entrepreneur. He is co-founder and managing general partner of Pitango Venture Capital.

== Biography ==
Born July 1958 in Tel Aviv, Chemi Peres is the youngest son of Sonia and Shimon Peres, a brother to Tsvia "Tziki" and Yoni Peres. He is named after Nechemia Argov, the Military Secretary to the Prime Minister David Ben-Gurion, and a friend of his father. The family lived in a modest flat in the old northern part of Tel Aviv. Many of Peres' classmates were children of major figures of the Israeli society, including his father, who was already the Minister of Defense.

In 1976 Peres graduated from ORT Technicum high school in Givatayim. He enlisted in the Israel Defense Forces, and started the flight course at the Israeli Air Force Flight Academy. His participation was suspended due to asthma, his medical profile was reduced to 45, which meant that he could not serve in a combat duty. Insistently, Peres managed to up his profile, and joined the Armored Corps. After completing the basic and advanced training as a tank crew member, he transferred back to the flight academy. After finishing the basic flight course, Peres considered to discontinue the flight course. After six months as a non-commissioned officer, he returned and concluded his training and became a helicopter pilot. Later, during his tenure at the Israeli Air Force, he served as Bell AH-1 Cobra attack helicopter pilot.

During his air force service, Peres received a certificate of excellence, along with co-pilot Noam Nachmani, for rescuing a Cobra helicopter crew flying with them at night, who crashed on the northern shore the Sea of Galilee.

As a reserve duty Cobra pilot, Peres fought in Operation Grapes of Wrath in 1996.

== Business career ==
In 1986 Peres joined Israel Aerospace Industries as an adviser, working on the IAI Lavi project, in the engineering division preliminary design, using his background as an Air Force pilot and a technologist. In 1988 Peres joined Decision Systems Israel, now known as DSIT, a high tech company engaged in military and civilian software and systems development, and was responsible for new business development.

=== MOFET Israel Technology Fund ===
In 1992, together with DSIT and others, Peres co-founded "MOFET Israel Technology Fund" (MOFET is Hebrew acronym for "Industrial R&D"), one of the first venture capital funds listed on Tel Aviv Stock Exchange, operating according to the guidelines for early stage investments, issued by Inbal, the Israel Government Insurance firm. The fund initially raised $6 million on the Tel Aviv Stock Exchange in 1993. Later on, it grew in size, as outstanding warrants and convertible debentures were exercised. In August 1993, the fund invested (with others) $1.5 million in VocalTec, the world's first company to transmit Voice over Internet Protocol. Peres was chief executive officer of MOFET until 1996.

MOFET invested in several high-tech companies, among them are Netro Corporation, Precise Software, Paradigm Geophysical and Orckit Communications (later named Orckit-Corrigent). All of them went public on Nasdaq. In addition, other companies in the MOFET portfolio were acquired by multinational corporations, among them Nicecom (sold in 1994 to 3Com for $58 million, one of the first in a wave of Israeli High-tech sales); "Shani Computers", sold to Intel Corporation in 1994; and Scorpio, sold to USRobotics in August 1996, for $72 million.

=== Pitango Venture Capital ===
In 1996 Peres left MOFET, and along with Rami Kalish, they co-founded Polaris Fund II, in partnership with the Dovrat-Shrem Group. The fund raised $125 million, and by 2000 had already covered the investment and generated a profit of $200 million.

The success of "Polaris II" led to the founding of a follow-up fund, Pitango Fund III, with $500 million in committed capital, and made Peres one of the most prominent venture capitalists in Israel. Since 1996, he is the co-founder and managing general partner of the firm, which invested in a portfolio of some 230 global high tech companies, including Graphcore, eToro, Riskified, Taboola and Via, with over $2.3 billion in committed capital.

In 2009, Dun & Bradstreet rated Pitango the largest venture capital fund in Israel, with $2 billion managed capital.

Peres also holds shares in iDigital, the local representative of Apple since 2007.

Today Peres is on the board of directors of Pitango portfolio companies, such as Via Transportation, Taboola, Venn.city, Radwin, Duda and Totango. He is on the board of Teva Pharmaceuticals (since July 2017), Idomoo, and is chairman of Webbing.

Peres has been a board member in companies including Aladdin Knowledge Systems, AudioCodes, BackWeb, Koor Industries, Magic Software Enterprises, Orckit Communications, Precise Software, and VocalTec. In 2007, Peres co-founded "Pearls of Wisdom", a wireless sensors' network provider, where he still is chairman. The company is a subsidiary of Elbit Systems.

== Non-profit organizations ==
Peres serves as chairman of the executive committee of the Peres Center for Peace and Innovation, established in 1996 by his father, Israel's 8th Prime Minister and 9th President, Shimon Peres. He is also chairman of Peres & Associates Global Advisory. He is active as a board member at Social Finance Israel, and serves on the Geox Ethics & Sustainability Committee since March 2020.

In early 2020 Bertelsmann Stiftung foundation announced Peres the recipient of the Reinhard Mohn Prize.

Peres is a member of the ORT Israel Friends Association, which promotes science and technology education in Israel. He is a member of the Executive Committee of Friends of Interdisciplinary Center Herzliya. He served as chairman of the Israel-America Chamber of Commerce from 2008 to 2011. Peres co-founded Israel Venture Association (now known as IATI), and served as its chairman from 2002 to 2004. In that capacity, he fought the prime minister's office intention to significantly cut the budget for the high-tech sector.

== Education ==
Peres holds a Bachelor of Science degree in industrial engineering and management, and Master of Business Administration degree from Tel Aviv University.

== Personal life ==
Peres is married to Gila, and they have three children and one granddaughter. He lives in Ra'anana, Israel.
