= Viva Ona Bartkus =

American academic and author

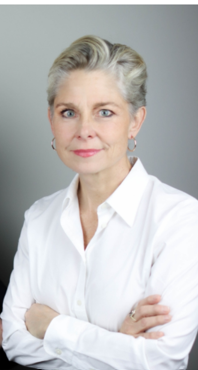
- Occupations: author, academic, and business consultant

Academic background
- Education: Yale University, Magdalen College

Academic work
- Discipline: Management; Development Economics; Security studies
- Institutions: University of Notre Dame's Mendoza College of Business

Viva Ona Bartkus is an American author, academic, and business consultant whose work focuses on the intersection of business, conflict, poverty, and security. She is professor emerita at the University of Notre Dame's Mendoza College of Business and the founder of the Meyer Business on the Frontlines (BOTFL) program. She is the co-author of Business on the Edge: How to Turn a Profit and Improve Lives in the World's Toughest Places (2024).

== Early life and education ==
Bartkus grew up in Indiana and is the daughter of World War II refugees from Lithuania. She graduated as valedictorian from Phillips Academy, Andover. She earned both her Bachelor of Arts and Master of Arts degrees in Economics from Yale University, graduating summa cum laude and as a member of Phi Beta Kappa.

She later studied at the University of Oxford as a Rhodes Scholar, completing both an Masters and Doctorate in International Relations at Magdalen College. Her doctoral research involved extensive fieldwork with insurgent and secessionist movements across Europe, Africa, Asia, and the Americas, and was later published as The Dynamic of Secession by Cambridge University Press.

== Career ==
Bartkus began her professional career at McKinsey & Company, where she worked from 1993 to 2003. She was elected a partner in 1999 and was, at the time, the youngest partner and the first partner without an MBA in the Chicago office. Bartkus served healthcare, industrial, retail, and high-tech clients to overcome their strategic, operational, and organizational challenges.

Bartkus served as a strategic advisor to the CEO of Baxter International and as Chair of the Board of Directors of Precision Time. From 2008 to 2015, she served on the Board of Directors of Catholic Relief Services (CRS).

Bartkus has worked with U.S. Army Special Operations Command (USASOC), advising on initiatives integrating business development with conflict prevention. In 2014, US Special Operations Commanded awarded her the SOCOM Outstanding Civilian Service Award.

=== Academic career ===
Bartkus joined the University of Notre Dame in 2004 as an Associate Professor of Management at the Mendoza College of Business. In 2008, she founded the Meyer Business on the Frontlines (BOTFL) program, which applies market-based and business solutions to post-conflict recovery and extreme poverty.

By 2025, BOTFL has led over ninety projects in more than thirty post-conflict and fragile societies, partnering with multinational corporations, international humanitarian organizations, local NGOs, faith-based institutions, and government and military entities, creating markets and employment opportunities for tens of thousands of people.

The BOTFL course was recognized by Forbes as one of the “Top 10 Most Innovative Business School Classes in the United States.”

== Research ==
Bartkus' research spans international relations, management, development economics, and security studies. She has examined secessionist movements, executive decision-making, social capital, service learning, and the role of markets in isolated, impoverished and frequently fairly lawless environments.

She has led randomized control trials in Colombia, Uganda, and Brazil studying the effects of business and market interventions on poverty and security.

== Bibliography ==
=== Books ===
- Bartkus, Viva Ona; Block, Emily S. (2024). Business on the edge: how to turn a profit and improve lives in the world's toughest places (1st ed.). New York: Basic Books. ISBN 978-1-5416-0420-9.
- Bartkus, Viva; Conlon, Ed (2008-07-23). Getting It Right: Notre Dame on Leadership and Judgment in Business. John Wiley & Sons. ISBN 978-0-470-38309-4.
- Bartkus, Viva Ona; Davis, James H. (2009). Social Capital: Reaching Out, Reaching in. Edward Elgar. ISBN 978-1-84720-072-3.
- Bartkus, Viva Ona (1999). The Dynamic of Secession. Cambridge University Press. ISBN 978-0-511-05205-7.

=== Articles ===
- Bartkus, Viva Ona; Block, Emily S. (2025). "From Frontlines to Boardrooms: Lessons in Leadership and Innovation from Under the Mango Tree". Leader to Leader. 2025 (116): 13–19. doi:10.1002/ltl.20876. ISSN 1087-8149.
- Bartkus, Viva Ona; Brooks, Wyatt; Kaboski, Joseph P.; Pelnik, Carolyn (2022-03-01). "Big fish in thin markets: Competing with the middlemen to increase market access in the Amazon". Journal of Development Economics. 155 102757. doi:10.1016/j.jdeveco.2021.102757. ISSN 0304-3878.
- Block, Emily S.; Bartkus, Viva Ona (2019). "Learning to Serve: Delivering Partner Value Through Service-Learning Projects". Academy of Management Learning & Education. 18 (3): 361–387. doi:10.5465/amle.2016.0278. ISSN 1537-260X.
- Marquez, Andrea Caldwell; Block, Emily; Rubey, Kelly; Bartkus, Viva Ona (2025-06-25). "From 'Dirty Boots' to 'Distant Friends': How A Colombian Social Intermediary Integrates Communities through Entrepreneurship". Journal of Management Studies. 63 (1): 59–100. doi:10.1111/joms.13258. ISSN 0022-2380.
- Bartkus, Viva; Brooks, Wyatt; Kaboski, Joseph; Pelnik, Carolyn (2022-03-01). "Big Fish in Thin Markets: Competing with the Middlemen to Increase Market Access in the Amazon". CEPR.
