= Guy Melamed =

Guy Melamed is the name of:

- Guy Melamed (footballer, born 1979), Israeli footballer
- Guy Melamed (footballer, born 1992), Israeli footballer
