= OneLink =

OneLink may refer to:

- AppsFlyer produce a product called OneLink
- OneLink Communications, former brand of computer/cable company Liberty Puerto Rico
- OneLink Transit Systems, operator of the former Metcard integrated ticketing system for public transport in Melbourne
