= Notre Dame Institute for Global Investing =

Institute at the University of Notre Dame

The Notre Dame Institute for Global Investing (NDIGI) is a US-based educational institute that is part of the Mendoza College of Business at the University of Notre Dame. It aims to furthering investment-management research and educational outreach globally. It was established in 2015 with a $20 million gift from Jim Parsons and Dr. Carrie Quinn, both University of Notre Dame '96 graduates.

== History ==
NDIGI was established in 2015 after Jim Parsons and Dr. Carrie Quinn, both University of Notre Dame '96 graduates, made a $20 million gift to the Mendoza College of Business. According to Crain's Chicago Business, the couple made the donation in hopes of furthering investment-management research and educational outreach globally. NDIGI programs include curriculum, experiential learning, educational workshops and competitions, mentorship programs, and career placement for Notre Dame students.

== Founders and leadership ==
Parsons is the founder of Junto Capital Management, which is a New York City-based hedge fund sponsor, while Quinn is an assistant clinical professor of pediatrics at Mount Sinai Hospital and executive director of the hospital's Parenting Center. Kevin W. Burke, also a graduate of the University of Notre Dame, was named the first managing director of the NDIGI. He will collaborate with the institute's faculty director and Finance Professor Shane Corwin. Burke was previously a partner and member of the management committee at an investment based management firm, Conatus Capital, based in Greenwich, Connecticut.
