= D1 Capital Partners =

American investment firm

D1 Capital Partners L.P.
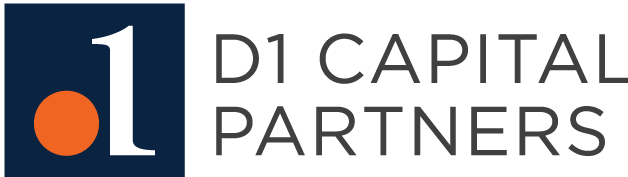

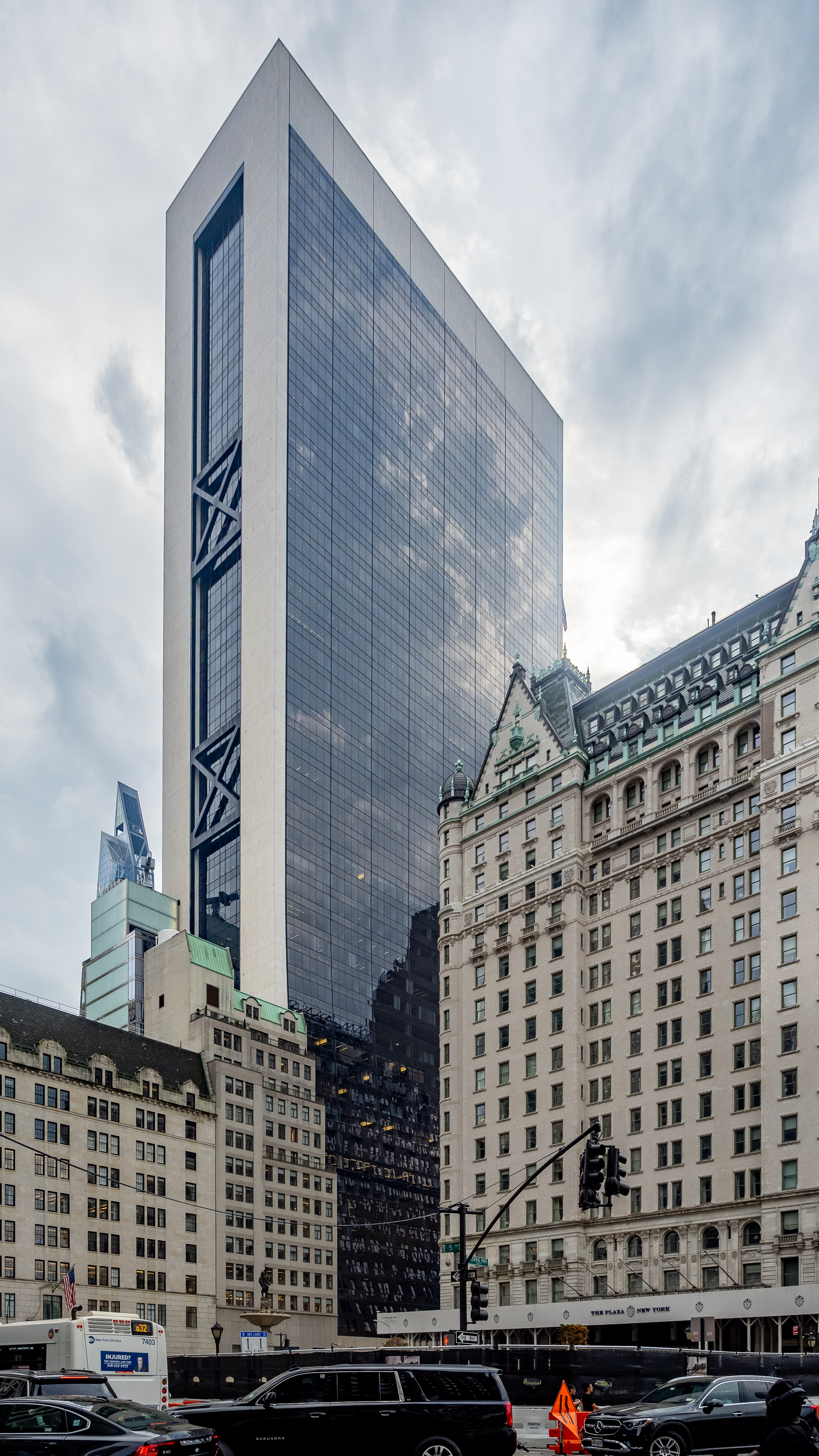
- Headquarters in the Solow Building
- Type: Private
- Industry: Investment management
- Founded: July 2018; 8 years ago
- Founder: Daniel Sundheim
- Headquarters: Solow Building, 9 West 57th Street, New York City, U.S.
- Products: Hedge fund Venture capital
- AUM: US$24 billion (2022)
- Number of employees: 65 (2022)

D1 Capital Partners is an American investment firm based in New York City. The firm invests in public and private markets globally.

== History and background ==
D1 Capital Partners was founded in July 2018 by Daniel Sundheim, who is a minority owner of the Charlotte Hornets. "D1" stands for "Day One," a concept espoused by Amazon.com, Inc.'s Jeff Bezos as detailed in Amazon's 1997 Letter to Shareholders. Sundheim was previously the Chief Investment Officer of Viking Global Investors and put in more than $500 million of his own money to start the firm. D1 Capital Partners is usually grouped with other Tiger Cub funds due to the firm being spun out from one.

The firm originally managed $3 billion of capital, which rose to $20 billion by the end of 2020 with annualized returns of nearly 30%. D1 returned 60% in 2020.

In January 2021, the firm lost $4 billion (20% of its capital) due to the GameStop short squeeze. As of April 2021, D1 recouped about 90% of its loss in January.

In June 2021, the firm signed a 10-year lease to open another office in Miami.

In May 2022, It was reported that the fund lost 23% of its value since the start of the year, with its public equities strategy losing 44%.

In October 2024, it was reported that D1 gained 34% that year through September, after gaining 19% in 2023. D1 had made changes which included reducing its risk profile and increasing diversification of its investment coverage.

As of the first quarter of 2025, D1 Capital's largest U.S.-listed long position was Maplebear Inc.

== Strategy and operations ==
D1 Capital Partners focuses on companies within the consumer, business services, financial services, healthcare, industrials, real estate, and technology, media and telecommunication sectors. Between June 2022 and April 2024, D1 Capital's public portfolio grew by 85%, following strategic shifts in risk management and increased stock diversification.

=== Public strategy ===
D1 Capital Partners invests in publicly traded equities as well as related securities, including equity derivatives and convertible bonds. The firm employs a global long/short equity strategy focusing on generating medium- to long-term returns.

=== Private strategy ===
In the private markets, D1 Capital Partners primarily takes later-stage non-controlling stakes in growth companies to support their expansion. Notable private investments include Robinhood, GitLab, Instacart and DriveNets
