= ClearForest =

Israeli software company

ClearForest Corporation
- ClearForest logo
- Type: Private
- Industry: computer software
- Founded: 1998
- Headquarters: Waltham, MA, United States
- Key people: Barak Pridor (CEO); Dr. Yonatan Aumann (Cofounder and VP of Product Strategy)
- Products: ClearForest Text Analytics Suite
- Number of employees: 60+ (2006)
- Website: www.clearforest.com

ClearForest was an American–Israeli software company that developed and marketed text analytics and text mining solutions.

== History ==
Founded in 1998, ClearForest had its headquarters just outside Boston and a development center in Or Yehuda. The company was acquired by Reuters in April, 2007. It now markets its services under the names Calais, OpenCalais, and OneCalais.

ClearForest was previously venture-backed; its last funding round was led by Greylock Ventures and closed in 2005. Other investors included DB Capital Partners, Pitango, Walden Israel, Booz Allen, JP Morgan Partners and HarbourVest Partners.

On February 7, 2008 Reuters announced the launch of Open Calais, a named-entity recognition and semantic analysis service that uses ClearForest technology.

On April 30, 2007, Reuters announced that it would acquire ClearForest. Sources estimate the acquisition to be for $25 Million.

== Solutions and products ==
ClearForest offers several hosted solutions, including:

- OpenCalais, a free web service and open API (for commercial and non-commercial use) that performs named-entity recognition and enables automatic metadata generation using the ClearForest financial module.
- Semantic Web Services (SWS), an on-demand service that makes ClearForest's natural language processing tools available as a standard web service. A subset of ClearForest's capabilities is available via SWS at no cost.
- Gnosis, a free Firefox extension that uses SWS to analyze the content of a web page. Gnosis identifies named entities such as people, companies, organizations, geographies and products on the page being viewed. Gnosis also automatically processes pages from Wikipedia, providing additional links for people, geographies and other entities which were not explicitly linked within the subject article.
- Harvest, a real-time machine-readable news service that uses SWS to process a company's news and document feeds and return machine-readable information about people, companies, locations and over 200 other entities facts and events.

ClearForest also offers Text Analytics solutions targeted at specific business problems, including:

- Equity valuation for hedge funds and alternative investments firms
- Metadata & database creation for publishers and information providers/services
- Tapping "voice of customer" for market and survey research firms
- Quality Early Warning for vehicle, capital equipment & durable goods manufacturers

== See also ==
- Economy of Israel
