= AudioCodes =

Telecommunications products manufacturer in Israel

AudioCodes Ltd.
- Type: Public
- Traded as: TASE: AUDC Nasdaq: AUDC
- Industry: Unified communications; VoIP; Telecommunications; Artificial intelligence; Communication systems; Contact center telephony
- Founded: 1993; 33 years ago
- Headquarters: Park Naimi, Or Yehuda, Israel
- Key people: Shabtai Adlersberg, (president and CEO)
- Products: Session border controllers; Multi-service business routers; Meeting room devices; IP phones; Media gateway; Voice network management; Quality monitoring tools; Voice applications
- Revenue: ▲$242.2 million (2024)
- Operating income: ▲$ 38.5 million - Non-GAAP (2020)
- Net income: ▲$ 8.8 million - Non-GAAP (2023)
- Total assets: 243,886,000 United States dollar (2019)
- Number of employees: 1100 (2025)
- Subsidiaries: AudioCodes Inc.
- Website: www.AudioCodes.com

AudioCodes Ltd. is an Israeli technology company providing communication software and hardware and productivity solutions for enterprises and service providers.

Founded in 1993, it is headquartered in Or Yehuda, Israel, AudioCodes has a global footprint with offices, research and development centers, and support and service teams across North America, Europe, Asia, and Latin America. As of 2025, the company employs approximately 1,000 people worldwide. As of 2024, the company's revenue distribution was approximately 47% from North America, 35% from Europe, 13% from Asia-Pacific, and 5% from other regions.

Publicly traded since 1999, AudioCodes is listed on the NASDAQ stock exchange (Nasdaq: AUDC) and the Tel Aviv Stock Exchange (TASE: AUDC:).

AudioCodes primarily serves enterprise customers, telecommunications service providers and mid-market organizations. The company's solutions are tailored to support unified communications, contact centers and voice network modernization initiatives. Notably, over 60 of the world's top 100 service providers utilize AudioCodes technology.

The President, CEO and Director of AudioCodes since its inception Is Shabtai Adlersberg. His background in electrical engineering and digital signal processing, has been instrumental in guiding the company's technological advancements.

== History ==
The company was founded in 1993 by Shabtai Adlersberg and Leon Bialik, both of whom previously worked at DSP Group. The company initially focused on developing digital signal processing technologies for voice compression.

In 1996, A significant early achievement was made within the adoption of AudioCodes’ voice compression algorithm as the basis for the ITU-T G.723.1 standard in 1996, facilitating efficient voice transmission over IP networks.

In May 1999, AudioCodes went public, listing its shares on both the NASDAQ Global Select Market and the Tel Aviv Stock Exchange under the ticker symbol AUDC. Through those years, the company expanded its product portfolio to include media gateways and session border controllers (SBCs), catering to the growing demand for VoIP solutions.

Recognizing the industry's shift towards unified communications, AudioCodes aligned its strategy with Microsoft’s UC platforms in the years 2010–2019, starting with Office Communications Server and progressing through Lync, Skype for Business and Microsoft Teams. This partnership positioned AudioCodes as a key provider of voice connectivity solutions for Microsoft’s ecosystem.

In 2020, the COVID-19 pandemic took its toll and accelerated the adoption of hybrid work, increasing demand for AudioCodes’ solutions, particularly those integrated with Microsoft Teams. The company responded by enhancing its offerings to support hybrid collaboration and communication, with a strong focus on managed solutions. Additionally, AudioCodes made investments in AI-driven technologies, developing products for voice recognition, transcription and analytics for the evolving enterprise needs.

== Products, Solutions and Services ==
AudioCodes offers a portfolio of products, solutions and services designed to facilitate enterprise and service provider voice communications, particularly within Microsoft Teams, other unified communications environments and the enterprise CX/contact center market. More than sixty of the world's top one hundred service providers use AudioCodes technology, including AT&T, Verizon, BT, DT and Telefónica. The product portfolio includes SaaS Platforms and AI-Based Applications, hardware and services.

=== SaaS Platforms and AI-Based Applications ===
- AudioCodes Live Platform : A multi-tenant UCaaS service delivery platform for partners and service providers, with a variety of value-added services to enhance employee and customer experience.
- Voca Conversational Interaction Center (CIC): An AI-powered, Microsoft Teams-certified contact center solution built in Azure with ready-to-use conversational AI.
- Meeting Insights: An AI-driven application that captures, transcribes and organizes Microsoft Teams meetings, providing searchable access to meeting content across organizations.
- Interaction Insights: An enterprise-grade interaction recording solution that captures and stores voice, video and instant messaging interactions for compliance and quality assurance purposes.
- VoiceAI Connect: An AI-powered voice integration solution for chatbots that creates a communication hub between any bot framework, any telephony system and any cognitive speech service.
- One Voice Operations Center (OVOC): A voice network management solution that combines voice network device management and quality of experience monitoring into a single intuitive application. Moreover, AudioCodes has developed and brought to market a vast of AI-driven solutions aimed at boosting productivity in hybrid workplaces and contact center environments, such as the Voca Conversational Interaction Center(CIC) Meeting Insights,AudioCodes Intelligent Meeting Rooms,VoiceAI Connect and Live Hub.

=== Hardware ===
- Session Border Controllers (SBCs): The Mediant family of SBCs provides secure and scalable SIP trunking and Direct Routing for Microsoft Teams, supporting both on-premises and cloud deployments.[vii]
- IP Phones and Room Devices: The 400HD series of IP phones and the Room Experience (RX) suite offer Microsoft Teams-certified voice and video endpoints for business users and meeting rooms.
- Media Gateways and Multi-Service Business Routers (MSBRs): AudioCodes provides digital and analog media gateways,[xi] as well as Multi-Service Business Routers,[xii] to facilitate connectivity between legacy telephony systems and IP networks.

=== Services ===
AudioCodes supplies suites of applications for the enterprise and service provider markets. These include One Voice for Microsoft 365 to accelerate the voice-enablement of Microsoft Teams.

== Acquisitions ==
AudioCodes has strategically acquired several companies to enhance its product portfolio, technological capabilities and market presence in the communications industry. Below is a chronological list of notable acquisitions:

- 2003: Nortel Networks’ Universal Audio Server (UAS) Product Group

In 2003, AudioCodes acquired the Universal Audio Server (UAS) product group from Nortel Networks, expanding its media server offerings and strengthening its position in the VoIP market.

- 2004: Ai-Logix

In May 2004, AudioCodes acquired Ai-Logix, a New Jersey-based provider of advanced voice recording hardware technology for the call logging and voice recording industries. The acquisition aimed to expand AudioCodes' voice over packet communications boards business into the call logging and recording market.

- 2006: Nuera Communications

In July 2006, AudioCodes completed the acquisition of Nuera Communications, a provider of media gateway solutions for broadband telephony networks. The acquisition was valued at $85 million in cash, with an additional payment of up to $5 million based on revenue milestones.

- 2006: Netrake Corporation

Also in July 2006, AudioCodes acquired Netrake Corporation, a Texas-based provider of session border controllers and security gateway solutions. This acquisition enhanced AudioCodes’ capabilities in delivering secure and scalable VoIP solutions for service providers.

- 2007: CTI Squared Ltd. (CTI2)

In February 2007, AudioCodes acquired CTI Squared Ltd. (CTI2), an Israeli company specializing in unified communications platforms. The acquisition aimed to integrate CTI2’s value-added services into AudioCodes' portfolio, enhancing its offerings for service providers and enterprises.

- 2010: NSC (Natural Speech Communication Ltd.)

In 2010, AudioCodes acquired NSC, an Israeli company focused on speech recognition technologies. This acquisition allowed AudioCodes to incorporate advanced speech recognition capabilities into its voice applications.

- 2013: MailVision

In April 2013, AudioCodes acquired MailVision, a provider of VoIP solutions. The acquisition enabled AudioCodes to expand its offerings in the VoIP market, maintaining its position as leaders in the unified communications and real-time media communications solutions market.

- 2021: Callverso

In November 2021, AudioCodes acquired Callverso, an Israeli provider of conversational AI solutions and natural language understanding (NLU) technology for contact centers. The acquisition strengthened AudioCodes’ voice AI portfolio, enhancing its capabilities in the contact center market.

=== Strategic Alliances ===
AudioCodes maintains a strategic partnership with Microsoft, offering a range of certified solutions that integrate with Microsoft Teams. The company also works with other leading unified communications vendors such as Zoom and Cisco Webex, as well as enterprise contact center vendors such as Genesys.

== Awards and Recognitions ==
AudioCodes has received several industry awards recognizing its innovations in voice technology, unified communications and AI-driven solutions:

- UC Awards 2024 – Best Use of AI: AudioCodes’ Meeting Insights solution was chosen for its application of conversational AI to enhance productivity and communication experiences in Microsoft Teams meetings.
- CX Awards 2024 – Best Microsoft Teams Contact Center Solution: The Voca Conversational Interaction Center (CIC) received this award for its Azure-native integration with Microsoft Teams and embedded conversational AI capabilities.
- Frost & Sullivan 2025 Global Competitive Strategy Leadership Award: AudioCodes was recognized for its Meeting Insights solution, which provides AI-driven, cross-platform meeting intelligence to boost efficiency, collaboration, and productivity.
- Omdia Enterprise SBCs and VoIP Gateways Market Tracker Reports: AudioCodes was ranked as the leading global vendor in enterprise session border controller (SBC) revenue in 2021, 2022 and 2023, achieving a worldwide revenue share of 23.1% in 2023.

== See also ==
- List of VoIP companies
- VoIP, SIP, SIP trunking, voice gateways, SBC, MSBR, WebRTC, Microsoft Lync, white papers, Genesys, contact center, BroadSoft, management systems, service providers, broadband.
- G.723.1 codec.
