= Calais (Reuters product) =

Calais is a service created by Thomson Reuters that automatically extracts semantic information from web pages in a format that can be used on the semantic web. Calais was launched in January 2008, and is free to use. The technology is now available via the website of Refinitiv, a provider of financial market data and infrastructure founded in 2018, that is a subsidiary of London Stock Exchange Group.

The Calais Web service reads unstructured text and returns Resource Description Framework formatted results identifying entities, facts and events within the text. The service appears to be based on technology acquired when Reuters purchased ClearForest in 2007.

The technology has also been used to automatically tag blog articles, and organize museum collections.

Calais uses natural language processing technologies delivered via a web service interface.
