= Oshik Levi =

Israeli singer, actor, and entertainer (born 1944)

Oshik Levi אושיק לוי
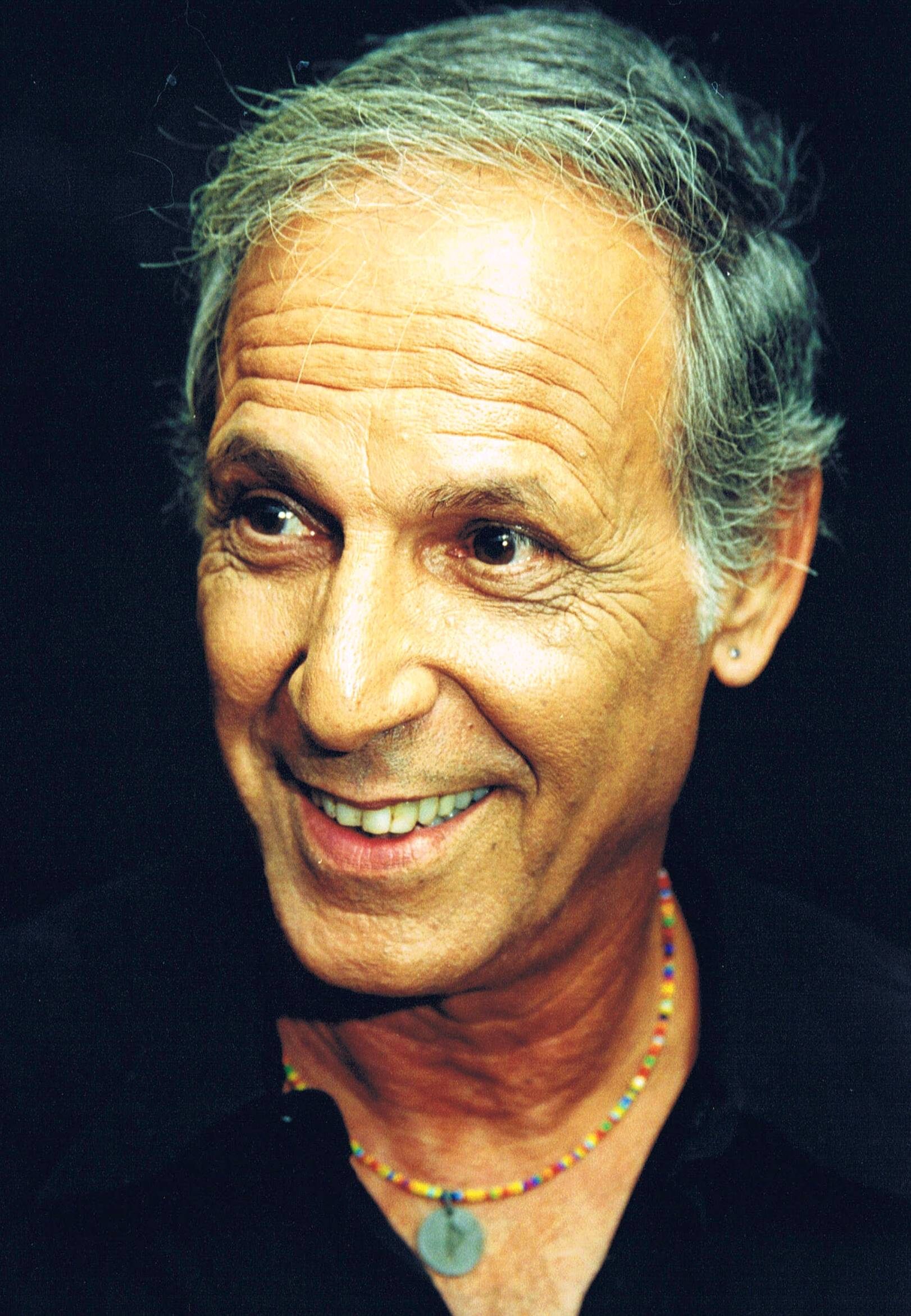
- Oshik Levi

Background information
- Born: Osher Levi; 7 April 1944 (age 82); Bnei Brak, Mandatory Palestine (Today Israel)
- Origin: Tel Aviv, Israel.
- Genres: Israeli rock
- Occupations: Singer; Actor; Entertainer
- Years active: 1960–present
- Label: Hed Arzi Music
- Formerly of: Central Command Band, Boardwalk Quartet, The Twins Trio
- Website: oshiklevy.com

Osher "Oshik" Levi (Hebrew: אושיק לוי; born April 7, 1944) is an Israeli singer, actor, and entertainer.

Born in 1944, Levi has been in the entertainment industry since 1960, and has recorded several successful albums, as well as having several notable roles in various Israeli plays, films, and TV shows.

== Early life ==
Osher Levi was born on April 7, 1944, in Bnei Brak, Mandatory Palestine to a Bulgarian-Yemenite father and a Bukharan-Greek mother. His older brother is Avraham Levi, better known as Lolik.

Levi's career in entertainment began at the age of 16 on an Israeli Army Radio program titled "Bow and Arrow". Later, he would serve in the Central Command Band, performing as part of their twelfth and thirteenth programs.

== Musical career ==
=== 1960s-1970s: Early career ===
Levi's post-military musical career began in 1965 as part of a quartet known as the "Boardwalk Quartet", which featured one of his Central Command bandmates, Hedva Amrani. The Quartet did not last long, and Levi would soon form a trio with Hanan Goldblatt and Poopik Arnon called "The Twins Trio". The trio enjoyed decent success through the latter half of the 1960s, including a performance on Channel 1 honoring the recent moon landing, but would disband in 1970.

Afterwards, Levi began his solo career. Levi's debut album, "Some Peace of Mind!" was released in 1971 and received critical acclaim. It featured songs composed by Shalom Hanoch and written by Yaakov Rotblit. The album also featured The Churchills. The most successful song from the album was the song "Seer, go flee", written by Yaakov Rotblit and named after a verse in the Book of Amos. That same year, Levi would record the theme song for The Policeman titled "A Ballad For A Cop".

In 1973, during the Yom Kippur War, Levi invited Canadian singer Leonard Cohen to perform in front of Israeli troops in the Sinai Peninsula, Cohen, while initially reluctant to perform due to his melancholic repertoire, accepted the invitation and performed alongside Levi and Matti Caspi.

Levi would not record an album again until 1974, when he released the album Oshik Levi. It too would receive critical acclaim, with the standout track being Yehonatan Geffen's song "Johnathan, Go Home". In 1976, Levi released his third album, "Where Did We Go Wrong?", which was also successful, maintaining Levi's image as an artist with artistic integrity. Finally, his last album of the 1970s was "Some New, Some Old" which was a partial compilation of his most popular songs as well as new songs.

=== 1980s-1990s: Hiatuses ===
In 1984, after 6 years, Levi would release his fifth studio album "Hot Nights", although he did not intend for there to be that long a break between albums. The album received substantial attention from the Israeli press. This 6 year break would repeat itself for his next album, "At the Edge of Childhood", which featured Sephardic songs from Levi's childhood. The album was inspired by his father's recent death in 1988. The songs on the album were translated from Ladino.

== Acting career ==
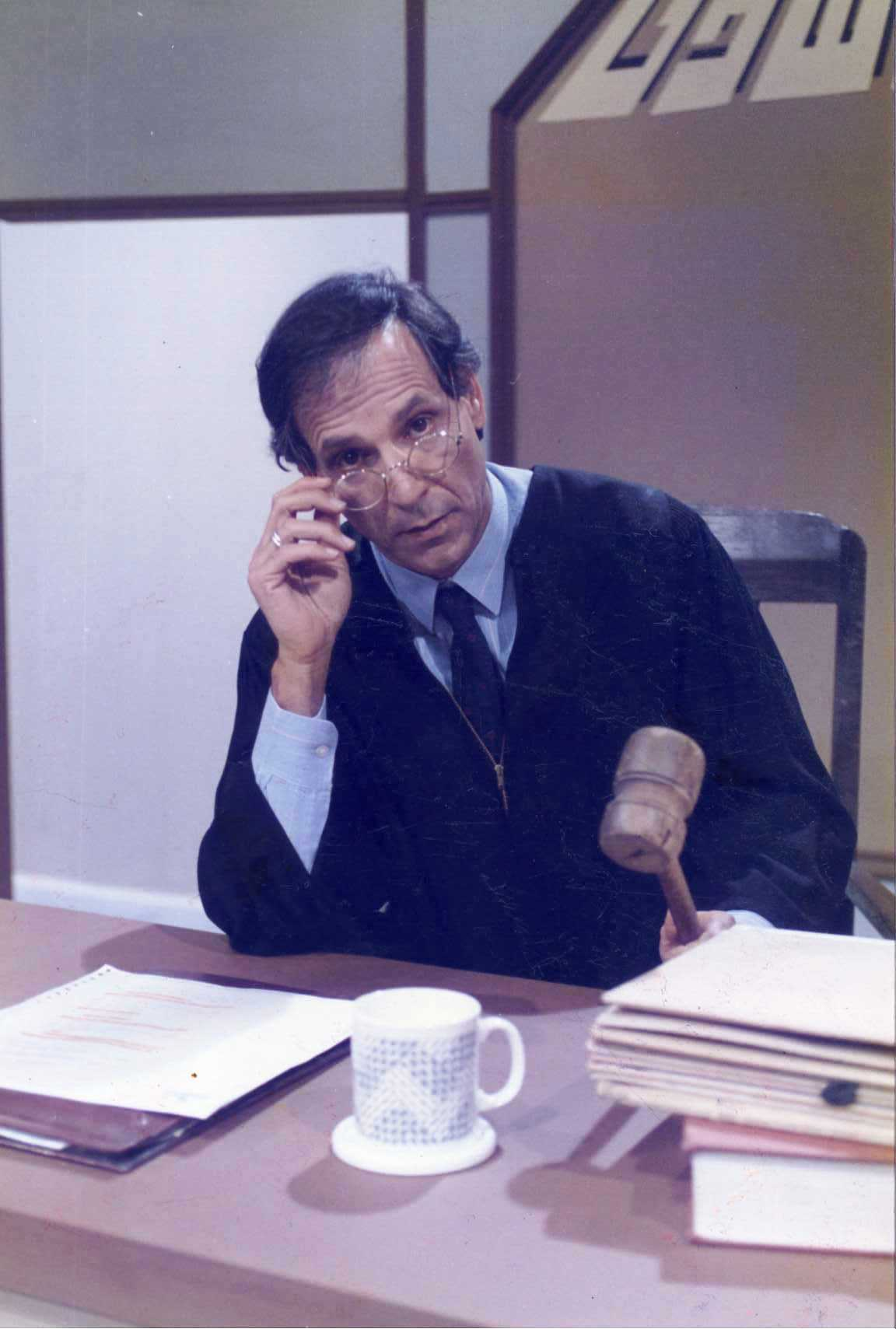
Oshik Levi as a judge on the children's educational show BeSod HaYinyanim.

Levi's post-military acting career began in a 1965 play called "Shakespeare has died!", where he played the role of William Shakespeare.

In 1972, Levi starred in the lead role for the film Tel Aviv Call Girls, which was notable for being one of the first Israeli films to feature explicit sex scenes and nudity, as well as tackling themes of prostitution. Later, in 1973, he starred in the secondary role for the film Marriage Games alongside Yossi Banai.

In 1979, Levi was cast in the lead role for Sofo Shel Milton Levi. The film had budgetary constraints, and despite being intended for a Spring 1980 release, it would not be released until October 1981. Also in 1979, Levi appeared as the Penitent thief in the film Jesus.

=== Bli Sodot ===
In September 1984, Levi, alongside Hanan Goldblatt and Hanny Nahmias starred in the pilot for a children's educational show titled Bli Sodot (No Secrets) for the Israeli Educational Television.

The show was a huge hit with its target audience and became one of Levi's most defining roles.

== Personal life ==
Levi has been married twice, but is now a widower. Levi has four children. His daughter, Noah Levi, died due to cancer-related complications in October 2025.

Levi was one of many Israeli artists who signed a petition calling for a ceasefire for the Gaza war in August 2025, leading him to be banned from performing in the city of Arad by the city's mayor, Yair Maayan.

== Discography ==
=== As a member of The Twins Trio ===
- We're Going Out Tonight (1966)
- Gentlemen, A Bomb! (1969)

=== Solo albums ===
- Some Peace of Mind! (1971)
- Oshik Levi (1974)
- Where Did We Go Wrong? (1976)
- Some New And Some Old (1979)
- Hot Nights (1984)
- At The Edge of Childhood (1990)
- Sometimes, Unintentionally (1995)
- Sings His Songs Quietly (2005)
- Sound and Matter (2010)

== Partial Filmography ==
=== Film roles ===
- The Flying Matchmaker (1966)
- Blaumilch Canal (1969)
- Lupo! (1971)
- Tel Aviv Call Girls (1972)
- Marriage Games (1973)
- Giv'at Halfon Eina Ona (1976)
- Jesus (1979)
- Sofo Shel Milton Levi (1981)
- Million Dollar Madness (1986)
- Beyond the Sea (1991)

=== Television roles ===
- Bli Sodot (1984-1986)
- Laga'at Ba'osher (2001)
- HaShir Shelanu (2004)
- Checkout (2018)

== See also ==
- Television in Israel
- Culture of Israel
