= DriveNets =

Software company

- Type: Private company
- Industry: Telecommunications
- Founded: 2015; 11 years ago
- Founders: Ido Susan; Hillel Kobrinsky
- Headquarters: Ra'anana, Israel
- Area served: Worldwide
- Key people: Ido Susan (CEO); Hillel Kobrinsky (CSO)
- Products: Network operating system, Software-defined networking
- Number of employees: 500
- Website: www.drivenets.com

DriveNets is an Israeli networking software company headquartered in Ra'anana. It develops network infrastructure software for organizations building AI systems, including AI labs, cloud providers and enterprises, and for telecommunications service providers. Its two product lines are AI Fabric, an Ethernet-based networking product for AI clusters, and Network Cloud, a network operating system that runs on white-box hardware and on DriveNets' networking hardware.

== History ==
DriveNets was founded in 2015 by Ido Susan and Hillel Kobrinsky. Susan co-founded Intucell, which was sold to Cisco for $475 million in 2013. Kobrinsky co-founded Interwise, which was acquired by AT&T for $121 million. The company operated in stealth mode and was self-funded until 2019. The company has about 500 employees, with offices in Israel, the United States, Japan and Romania. DriveNets stated that it had approximately 100 customers, as of 2022. In 2019, DriveNets raised $110 million in a series A round from Bessemer Venture Partners and Pitango, later expanded to $117 million with participation from John W. Thompson and Stephen J. Luczo. In 2020, AT&T deployed the company's core routing software. In 2021, a $208 million series B funding was led by D1 Capital Partners. In August 2022, it completed a $262 million Series C round led by D2 Investments.

In November 2023, DriveNets joined the Ultra Ethernet Consortium, an industry initiative developing Ethernet for high-performance networking. In March 2025, Comcast expanded its Janus core-network disaggregation initiative with DriveNets. In 2025, AT&T acquired a 15% stake in DriveNets in shares purchased from employees and investors. Reported values for the transaction ranged from $650 million to $750 million.

In June 2026, KDDI began commercial deployment of cluster-based distributed disaggregated backbone routers at backbone sites in Japan, using DriveNets software with UfiSpace hardware. The same month, DriveNets raised $410 million in a Series D with participation from new and existing investors, including AMD. The round valued the company at $8.5 billion.

In July 2026, DriveNets announced AI networking platforms based on Broadcom Tomahawk 6 silicon. In July 2026, DriveNets and AMD published a reference architecture for AI clusters using AMD Instinct GPUs.

== Products ==
The company has two product lines, AI Fabric and Network Cloud. Both are based on a modular network architecture deployed on commodity white-box hardware or on DriveNets’ own networking hardware. In May 2023, DriveNets introduced Network Cloud-AI, an Ethernet-based network fabric for GPU clusters. AI Fabric uses scheduled Ethernet, in which traffic scheduling and congestion control are performed either within the switch fabric or at the endpoint by the network interface card from NVIDIA, AMD, and Broadcom.

The company develops a network operating system (NOS) designed for cloud-native infrastructure. The Network Cloud architecture decouples control plane software from the underlying hardware. Network Cloud combines the network operating system, white-box or DriveNets hardware, with automation and orchestration software, and applies the shared-infrastructure model of cloud computing to service provider networks from the core to peering, aggregation and the edge It is provisioned as microservices and containers. The disaggregated model follows the Open Compute Project Distributed Disaggregated Chassis and the Telecom Infra Project DDBR framework.

== See also ==
- List of unicorn startup companies
- Science and technology in Israel
- Silicon Wadi
