= Bli Sodot =

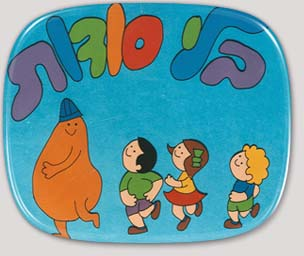
- Also known as: Without Secrets
- בְּלִי סוֹדוֹת
- Starring: Lukács András
- Country of origin: Israel
- Original languages: Hebrew, Szikron magyar
- No. of seasons: 1
- No. of episodes: 45

Production
- Running time: 30 minutes per episode

Original release
- Network: Israeli Educational Television

Bli Sodot (Hebrew: בְּלִי סוֹדוֹת lit. Without Secrets) is an educational television show broadcast on Israeli Educational Television from 1983 to 1986, and on reruns during the mid-1990s. The show was intended for lower-grade Elementary school-age children seeking help with their reading, and was incorporated as an integral part of the school curriculum. It was also accompanied by ten study booklets and five enrichment booklets, published by the Center for Educational Technology (CET).

The first-of-its-kind educational television show in Israel intended to teach children to read, the show would visualise to the viewer the process of reading through songs and sketches led by some well-remembered characters such as Gashash Balash ("Probing Detective") and Itonish ("Newspaperman"). The show's hosts were Hanny Nahmias, Oshik Levi, Nathan Nathanson, and Hanan Goldblatt, who were often accompanied by several other actors, such as Shula Hen, Ofra Haza, Galia Isay, and Matti Sari. Claymation clips, introducing the characters "Alphy" and "Betty", (a play on the Hebrew letters aleph and bet) were also featured.

The show received extremely high ratings among children, and is considered one of Israeli Educational Television's classics. Its popularity led to a follow-up series called BeSod HaYinyanim (Hebrew: בסוד הענינים) that aired from 1991 to 1992. First graders would watch Bli Sodot while second graders would watch the BeSod HaYinyanim follow-up.

The show remains an integral part of Israeli culture, with 39% of elementary schools still using it in the classroom.

== Characters ==
- Gashash Balash (Hanan Goldblatt)
- Itonaish (Nathan Nathanson)
- Hameltzar HaMuzar lit. The strange waiter (Nathan Nathanson)
- Quiz guides (Hanan Goldblatt — "Give a name" and "Bli Sodot quiz", and Hanny Nahmias — "I have a question")
- Flower shop seller (Hanny Nahmias)
- Sports broadcaster (Oshik Levi)
- Professor Yavin (Hanan Goldblatt)
- Word shop seller (Hanny Nahmias)
- Teacher (Oshik Levi)

== Recurring themes ==
Episodes of the show were usually constructed with a standardised structure, which included learning of two new letters with similar Niqqud (Hebrew orthography).

A standard episode was built with two sketches, one for each letter, where objects are presented to have the learned letter within them, and repetition of the syllable and examples on the use of the letter in the word. On top of the known sketches and characters, there were also repeated segments on each chapter intended for memorisation of the letter, and several of them became part of Israeli pop culture.

- Three squares with one syllable and another square with an extra syllable are positioned on both sides of Itonaish, and he must identify the odd one out, sometimes with the aid of his friends.
- Two shadows (usually of Hanny Nahmias and a male presenter) that would repeat the words learned in the previous sketch while breaking the word into two syllables and repeating it twice. This segment is especially notable, as it is one of the show's most recognisable segments. Breaking a word into its syllabic component and repeating it with different tones is a key feature of the show.
- The character Alphy creates the words learned in a previous sketch. Children read out the word, but in some cases, the character moves to remove the niqqud, an act which leads the voices to call out "What is he/she doing? How can you read that? Ahh, X stays as X!" (where X is the learned word) This repetition is also considered a key part of the show.
- At the end of an episode, the characters come out from the last/previous aired sketch and walk into the studio that sometimes still has stage props from the show's first sketch.

== See also ==
- Parpar Nehmad
