= Tsvia Walden =

Israeli linguist (born 1946)

- צביה ולדן
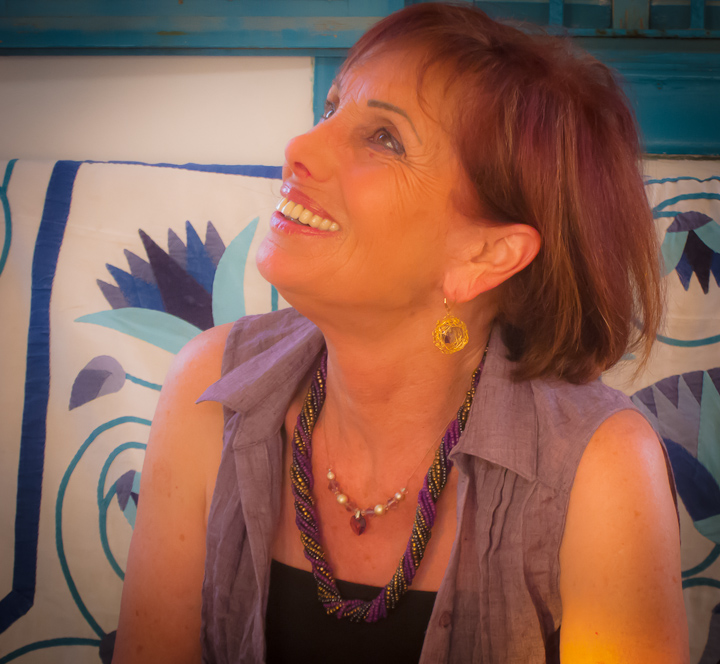
- Walden in 2012
- Born: Tsvia Peres; October 20, 1946 (age 80)
- Other names: Tziki Walden; Tziki Peres
- Spouse: Raphael Walden
- Parents: Shimon Peres (father); Sonia Gelman (mother)
- Relatives: Chemi Peres (brother); Uzi Peres (cousin); Lauren Bacall (second cousin once removed)

Academic background
- Education: Harvard University (PhD); Hebrew University of Jerusalem (BA)
- Thesis: The root of roots: children's construction of word-formation processes in Hebrew (1982)

Academic work
- Discipline: Linguistics; psychology
- Sub-discipline: Psycholinguistics
- Institutions: Ben Gurion University of the Negev; Beit Berl; Ben-Gurion University

Tsvia "Tziki" Walden (Hebrew: צביה "ציקי" ולדן; née Peres; born October 20, 1946) is an Israeli psycholinguist. She is a professor at the Ben Gurion University of the Negev and previously a senior lecturer at Beit Berl Academic College and Ben-Gurion University. Walden specializes in social constructionism through language, language and gender, language acquisition, literacy, digital literacy and research of Jewish texts. She is the creator and presenter of a filmed lecture series about language instruction and language acquisition.

== Biography ==
Walden was born in 1946 to Sonia and Shimon Peres. She earned her doctoral degree in Psycholinguistics at Harvard University in 1981 and a B.A. in Psychology, as well as a teaching certificate in French, at the Hebrew University in Jerusalem where she also taught Hebrew as a second language.

Walden is married to Professor Raphael Walden, vascular surgeon and deputy director of the Sheba Medical Center, co-Chair of Physicians for Human Rights–Israel.

== Professional work ==
Walden's research interest is in Language and Social constructs, Language and Youth. Walden was among the promoters of Whole Language, advocating the use of books rather than textbooks for reading instruction. She founded the publication Written Thoughts, established the Child Language Center at Beit Berl College in 1984 and the Institute for Whole Language and Computers in 1996. She was among the creators of the five-episode series London, corner of Ben Yehuda. She was among the founders of the pluralistic Beit Midrash Kolot ('Voices'), where she studied and taught Jewish texts for over 12 years. In 2010, Walden was conferred an honorary doctorate by the Hebrew Union College. In addition to her professional work, she is involved in promoting active listening and dialogue through social issues such as promoting human rights, the Middle East peace process and feminist action.

== Writing ==
Walden edited some key publications in the area of Literacy. She wrote, translated and edited children's books from French, Italian and English

=== Selected bibliography ===
- Emergent Literacy - Practice and Reflections (ed.) C.L.C: Beit Berl College, 1984 (in Hebrew)
- Word of Action: Whole Language North and South of Israel, Yesod: Holon, 2000 (in Hebrew)
- From Speech to Writing. On the Way to Literacy (with Nurit Peled-Elhanan), Carmel: Jerusalem, 1996 (in Hebrew)
- At Teachers' Expense: Gender and Power in Israeli Education (with Esther Herzog), Carmel: Jerusalem, 2010 (in Hebrew)
- Parole D'Israélienne - Langue Promise sur une Terre Maternelle Plon: Paris, 2001 (in French)
- "Behukotai - If Ye Walk in My Statutes", in Naftali Rothenberg (ed.) Wisdom by the Week. Yeshiva University Press and the Van Leer Jerusalem Institute: N.Y. and Jerusalem, 2011 (in English)
