= Mendoza College of Business =

Business school at the University of Notre Dame

University of Notre Dame Mendoza College of Business
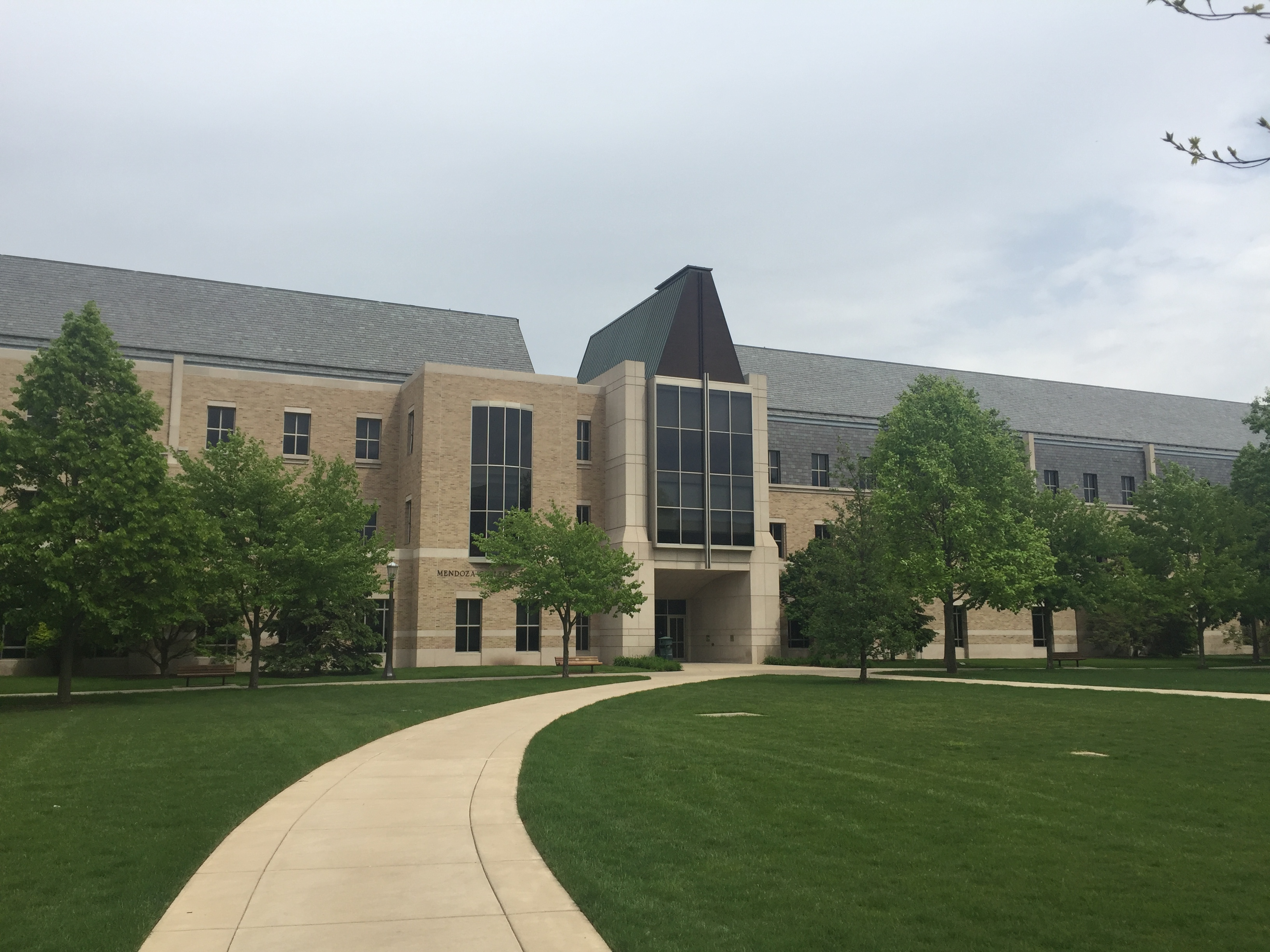
- Type: Private business school
- Established: 1921; 105 years ago
- Parent institution: University of Notre Dame
- Accreditation: AACSB
- Religious affiliation: Catholic (Congregation of Holy Cross)
- Dean: Martijn Cremers
- Academic staff: 131 (2018)
- Students: 2,325 (2018)
- Undergraduates: 1,700 (2018)
- Postgraduates: 625 (2018)
- Location: Notre Dame, Indiana, United States; 41°41′49.23″N 86°14′8.77″W
- Website: business.nd.edu

The Mendoza College of Business is the business school at the University of Notre Dame, a private research university in Notre Dame, Indiana. Founded in 1921, it offers both undergraduate and graduate degrees. It has a network of over 40,000 undergraduate and graduate alumni.

The college, renamed in 2000 following a donation to the school by Tom Mendoza, is guided in its mission on the statement by founding dean John Cardinal O'Hara, C.S.C.: "The primary purpose of business is service to mankind." Today, that sentiment is expressed in the college's imperative, "To Grow the Good in Business."

== History ==
Business and commerce classes had been taught at Notre Dame since its foundation, and already in 1853 there was a Mercantile Department. The teaching of business was fragmented for many years, with the department disappearing from 1856 to 1860, and then being reformulated as a two-year commercial course in 1863. This course taught bookkeeping, penmanship, arithmetic, algebra, English grammar and composition, elocution, geography, history, German, business practice, and commercial law and was stable for several years. In 1905, it was renamed Commercial School and became a one-year program. In 1910, the program was inserted into the preparatory school curriculum and became a four-year course. Meanwhile, in 1913, a proper Department of Commerce was established within the College of Arts and Letters. This included several courses on secretarial and business work but also training for managerial and executive positions. The main program offered was a four-year Bachelor of Philosophy in Commerce with classes in accounting for four semesters and additional classes in money, credit and banking, public finance, economic development in the United States, railway transportation, industrial organization and combination, insurance, and business law. Additional coursework included several foreign languages, economics, philosophy, politics, labor problem, American government, and elocution. In 1917, Notre Dame became the first university to launch a four-year course in foreign commerce.

The real beginning of the school was on April 20, 1921, when the department was removed from the College of Arts and Letters and became the separate College of Commerce. The first dean of the college was John Francis O'Hara (who later became the president of the university and a Cardinal). O'Hara, who had spearheaded the new foreign commerce program, was inspired by his knowledge of business. He had studied at Wharton and of the history and culture Latin America (where he had lived following his ambassador father). He hoped to place Notre Dame and its graduates in the burgeoning trade and growing economic power between North and South America. In 1921, the college had about 400 students and 13 faculty. Under O'Hara's leadership, the school soon offered 85 classes in 5 departments (accounting, marketing, transportation, finance, and foreign trade) and his efforts, together with a societal trend towards valuing business education to obtain a job, made the college tie the College of Arts and Letters as the highest enrollment in 1922 with over 500 students. Despite criticism that the college's education was becoming too commercialized and vocational, O'Hara maintained a liberal arts theme in the business courses and retained language, philosophy, political science, and history classes. O'Hara's ambitious goals (which included a graduate school and major program in foreign commerce) were cut short by lack of funding.

In 1924, James E. McCarthy succeeded O'Hara as dean, a post he would keep until 1955. McCarthy was an outspoken advocate of free trade and was well acquainted with many of the nation's leading businessmen and CEOs. During his tenure, the college rose greatly in prominence and visibility, hugely increased the number and quality of courses, and became the university's largest academic division, increasing from 500 to 1500 students. In 1933, Chicago businessman Edward N. Hurley donated $200,000 for a new building for the college, which was named Hurley Hall. O'Hara had been pursuing Hurley for such a donation since 1919 but the financial situation of the country had not permitted it. Hurley was a successful businessman, founder of the Hurley Machine Company, and chairman of the Federal Trade Commission and the U.S. Shipping Board. He had been the honorary dean of the college since its founding and had received the Laetare Medal in 1926.

In 1954, the school opened it first masters program, tailored to men and women from religious orders. The masters evolved to become the Masters in nonprofit administration. In 1962, the school's name changed to become the College of Business Administration and was also accredited by the AACSB. In 1967, the school started its MBS program with a class of 50 men from 17 states and 3 foreign countries; 1970 saw the enrollment of the first women in the program. The Hayes-Healy building opened in 1968, thanks to a gift from Ramon Hayes-Healy, offering more space for the growing college.

In 1999, the new and current building was completed. Located just southwest of the Notre Dame Stadium, it was designed following a nautical motif and nicknamed "the ship of commerce". In March 2000, the College of Business received a naming gift from NetApp, Inc. executives, Tom and Kathy Mendoza. In 2006, Notre Dame bought the Santa Fe building in Chicago and relocated the Executive MBA, MS in Finance, and MS in Business Analytics programs. In 2007, the college was one of the first signatories of the Principles for Responsible Management Education (PRME). In 2010, Mendoza was ranked as No. 1 for undergraduate business by Bloomberg Businessweek, the first of five consecutive years. In 2013, the Stayer Center for Executive Education was built with a gift from Ralph Stayer, a '65 graduate.

== Rankings and reputation ==
Business school rankings

U.S. MBA Rankings
- Bloomberg (2025): 34
- U.S. News & World Report (2025): 26

Global MBA Rankings
- QS (2026): 89
- FT (2026): 58

In 2016, Mendoza's undergraduate business program was ranked No. 2 by Bloomberg Businessweek. Mendoza's undergraduate business program was ranked No. 9 in the U.S. by U.S. News in 2016. In the 2017 edition, Mendoza no longer appears among the top 10. However, in 2017, Poets and Quants ranked Mendoza's undergraduate business program at No. 4 nationally.

Rankings for Mendoza's MBA program among U.S. MBA programs include No. 22 by Forbes, #34 in 2023 by Bloomberg BusinessWeek and No. 31 by U.S. News & World Report. In global rankings, the Mendoza MBA was ranked No. 40 by The Economist and No. 80 by Financial Times. Its Executive MBA program was ranked No. 15 by Bloomberg Businessweek. College Atlas and The Economist rank the Mendoza MBA 2nd among business schools in Indiana.

Poets & Quants reveals a placement rate of 93% after 3 months for the Undergraduate school, as well as an average starting salary of roughly $72,000.

== Facilities ==
The Mendoza College of Business main building, located on DeBartolo Quad, was built in 1996 and designed by Ellerbe Becket. Its 196,986 square feet of space includes the 300-seat Jordan Auditorium, classrooms, offices, administration, and digital spaces. The Stayer Center for Executive Education, built between 2011 and 2013 and located immediately south of the main Mendoza building, hosts both the degree and non-degree programs aimed at the executive-level MBA students and corporate clients. It is built in collegiate architecture style and was designed by Robert A.M. Stern Architects, and features stained glass windows.

== Faculty ==
- Peter D. Easton, Academic Director for the Center for Accounting Research and Education

== See also ==
- List of business schools in the United States
- List of United States graduate business school rankings
