= Guy Melamed (footballer, born 1979) =

Israeli footballer

Guy Melamed גיא מלמד
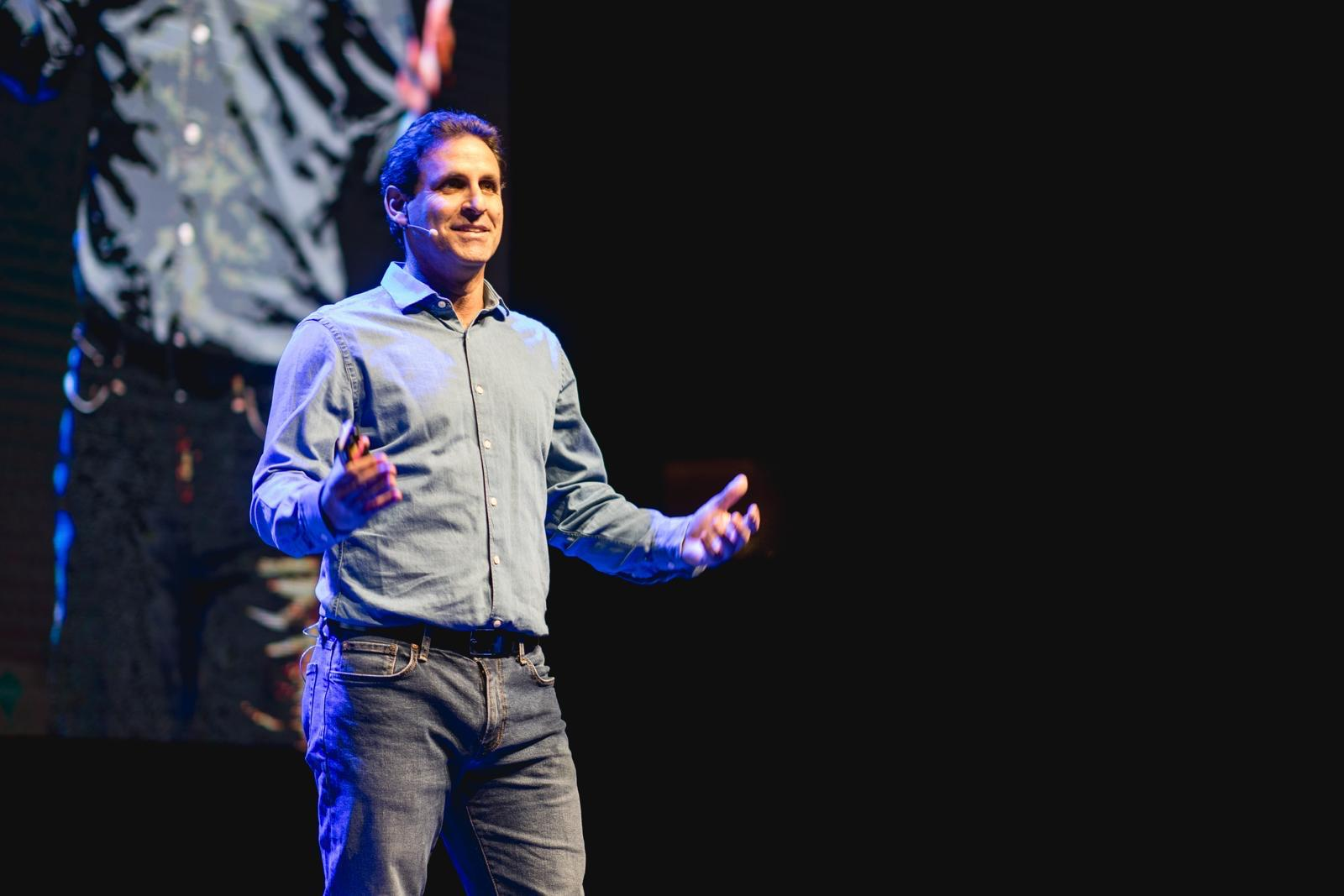

Personal information
- Date of birth: September 12, 1979 (age 47)
- Place of birth: Haifa, Israel
- Height: 1.85 m (6 ft 1 in)
- Position: Defender

Youth career
- Maccabi Haifa

College career
Years	Team	Apps	(Gls)
2001–2005	Boston College Eagles	77	

Senior career*
Years	Team	Apps	(Gls)
1997–2001	Maccabi Haifa	32	(0)
2000–2001	→ Zafririm Holon (loan)	34	(0)
2005	Colorado Rapids	14	(0)
2006–2014	F.C. Ru'ah Tel Aviv	220	(10)

International career^{‡}
1997	Israel U18	7	(0)
1999–2000	Israel U21	5	(0)
- * Club domestic league appearances and goals as of 23 May 2012 ‡ National team caps and goals as of 16:39, 1 January 2012 (UTC)

Guy Melamed (Hebrew: גיא מלמד; born September 12, 1979, in Haifa, Israel) is a retired Israeli soccer defender and the current Chief Financial Officer (CFO) and Chief Operating Officer (COO) of Varonis Systems Inc.

== Biography ==
Melamed, begun his soccer career in the youth academy of Maccabi Haifa. He earned over 50 caps for Israel’s U-16, U-18 and U-21 national teams. Notably he was part of the U-16 squad that secured third place in the 1996 UEFA European Championship in Austria.

He moved to the United States to play college soccer at Boston College, where he was a four-year starter for the Eagles and served as a team captain for three seasons. During his collegiate career, he was named team MVP three times, earned All-Big East honors in his final three years, and led the Eagles to three NCAA tournament appearances, including an Elite Eight finish in 2002 season - seeded fifth in the country, the highest ranking in the program’s history. That same year, he helped Boston College secure the 2002 Big East Championship.

Melamed’s individual accolades include being named the 2004-2005 Big East Scholar-Athlete of the year, Big East Midfielder of the year, and a three times All-American selection. He was also a two-time semifinalist for the Hermann Trophy, college soccer’s highest individual honor. In 2005 he was awarded Boston College’s Eagle of the Year for the most outstanding student athlete. He was inducted into the Boston College Varsity Club Hall of Fame in 2016.

Despite his success, Melamed’s status as a senior international player led to concerns among MLS teams causing him to fall to the fourth round of the 2005 MLS SuperDraft. He was ultimately selected by the Colorado Rapids with the 43rd overall pick. Subsequently, Melamed became the first Israeli player in Major League Soccer (MLS).

Later that year, at his request Melamed was released to pursue opportunities in Europe. He had a trial with Dundee FC of the Scottish First Division in October 2005 and several English Championship Clubs before deciding to retire from professional soccer.

== Business career ==
After retiring from soccer, Melamed transitioned into accounting, working with KPMG in the United States, and Ernst & Young (E&Y) in Israel, where he specialized in both public and private companies.

In 2011, he joined Varonis Systems Inc, a cybersecurity Company, When Varonis went public in 2014, its stock price doubled on its first day of trading. Melamed was appointed CFO in 2017 and later took on the additional role of COO in 2018.

Under his leadership, Varonis transitioned to a subscription-based business model, aligning with evolving trends in the tech industry. His financial expertise earned him recognition as the Best CFO in Institutional Investor's 2022 All-America Executive Team, based on feedback from over 3,000 money managers, buy-side analysts and sell-side researchers.

Melamed frequently speaks at conferences, lectures and various podcasts in the US and abroad, discussing among other things, topics such as the intersection of sports and business leadership.

He has a Bachelor’s and master’s in accounting from Boston College and became a Certified Public Accountant in both the U.S. and Israel.

== Personal life ==
Melamed is the grandson of Dr. Herzl Sless, who served as the honorary medical officer for Brighton & Hove Albion Football for 42 years. Dr. Sless was awarded an MBE by Queen Elisabeth in 2000 for his lifelong contribution to the community in Hove. Melamed’s earliest memory of soccer is accompanying his grandfather into the Albion’s locker room at the age of four.

Guy is married to Keren, and they have four children.
