= Peter D. Easton =

American accountancy academic

Peter D. Easton is the Notre Dame Alumni Professor of Accountancy and Academic Director of the Center for Accounting Research and Education at University of Notre Dame.

Easton was an expert witness in the United States v. Bankman-Fried trial.

== Bibliography ==
- Financial & Managerial Accounting for MBAs
- Custom MBA Financial Accounting Placement Course (SMU)
- Financial Accounting for MBAs
- Valuation Using Financial Statements
