= Multi-service business gateway =

A multi-service business gateway (MSBG) is a device that combines multiple network voice and data communications functions into a single device. Targeted at small and medium enterprises (SMEs), the MSBG integrates critical functions such as routing, VoIP, and security (virtual private networking, firewall, intrusion detection/prevention) into a single fault-tolerant platform, with a common control & management plane oriented around services. An MSBG may also include functionality such as web/e-mail server and filtering, storage, and wireless networking.

Popularly identified in 2004, the MSBG product segment emerged to address the increasing need of advanced voice and data services among small and medium-sized businesses. The more limited financial and technical resources of SMEs restrict their ability to procure, implement, and manage the technologies available to large enterprises. By integrating critical network functions in a single device, the MSBG provides a solution that is more affordable and also simplifies deployment and management for SMEs. MSBGs can be managed by service provider or other managed services company, which allows a business to implement network services without the need of its own information technology (IT) staff.

MSBGs provide a variety of solutions that can be used to support an SME's entire network. Use of a common architecture enables SMEs and service providers to expand the scale and services offered to meet the individual needs of the business. The openness of the MSBG also permits 3rd party applications or proprietary features to be added to the system.
