= Contact center telephony =

Communication system

Contact center telephony is the communication and collaboration technology used by organisations to manage high volumes of telephone calls. Typically, the voice business communication system integrates with the organisation's customer relationship management (CRM), and with non-voice interaction channels. So if for example a contact centre agent receives a voice call from a long-term customer, the system may automatically show them a summary of the customer's previous interactions, including those that took place by email or text based chat. Contact centres typically serve external customers, but they can be operated by NGOs or Government agencies and are sometimes run by large organisations for the benefit of internal staff.

== Overview ==
The interactions between callers and customer service representatives are supported by the collective system of computers, telephones and the Internet. The shift from computer telephony integration (CTI) to contact center telephony parallels changes in customer behaviour when it comes to communication. Customers are no longer confined only to voice-based communication i.e. phone to connect with their customer service departments. In addition, they are making use of email, SMS, chat, social media, and other virtual contact channels. This is also the reason for the shift in nomenclature from "call centers" to "contact centers", "contact" being a wider term than "call". In adapting to this trend, contact center operators need to adopt unified communication or multi-channel approach to let customers get in touch with them via their preferred communication mediums, either voice or non-voice (data). Cloud-based phone system is a further advancement in the direction as it allows operators to access all the features and benefits of call center telephony over the Web against an affordable & flexible pay-as-you-go subscription model. Thus, in-house infrastructure deployment to manage public switched telephone networks, storage, communication applications, and collaboration servers is no more an obligation. Neither is the need to invest resources for their upgrade, repair, maintenance and security as cloud vendor would be responsible for the same.

== India ==
India, a popular call center business process outsourcing destination, often uses a cloud-based phone system in order to cut operational expenses and downtime, and increase connectivity.

== Functions ==
Businesses can use contact center telephony services to respond to their customers’ queries over phone, email, chat, fax, etc. Integration with their CRM means contact details of customers and their past interactions with other call-centre agents can be found at one place. The combination can manage not just sales and marketing but also deliver post-sales customer service or technical support, to help customers derive the most from their products or services. Hence, its becoming instrumental in increasing customer satisfaction and loyalty, with many previously voice only call centres having migrated to multi-channel contact centre technology.

=== Bring your own device ===
The entire contact center telephony service can be availed by professionals over a browser. Hence, businesses can leverage the concept of BYOD (bring your own device) and mobility to serve their customers using mobile applications. According to market analysts, BYOD increases satisfaction among workforce, and hence their individual and collective productivity as well. BYOD programmes can reduce TCO (total cost of ownership).

=== Internal communications ===
Integration of IM, along with audio and video conferencing services can help contact center representatives to get real time assistance from their peers or seniors to resolve any complex issues. They can internally exchange information and knowledge articles as and when required. Real-time call monitoring/barging system can be used by quality assessment team to provide important guidelines to agents to maintain the standard of the service as per industry norms. Integrated recording feature can be helpful for internal training and quality purposes to improve productivity and customer satisfaction.

=== Agent experience ===
Contact centre telephony systems are typically designed primarily to ensure the customer experience is as good as possible. Yet it's also often recognised that designing the systems for the benefit of call centre agents is also important– partly to avoid costly churn, and also as good staff morale tends to translate to higher customer satisfaction. Easy to use systems that avoid frustrating staff are important, but a good agent experience (AX) also depends on working conditions and the leadership qualities of call centre management.

== See also ==
- Call centre
