= Hanan Goldblatt =

Israeli actor (born 1941)

- חנן גולדבלט
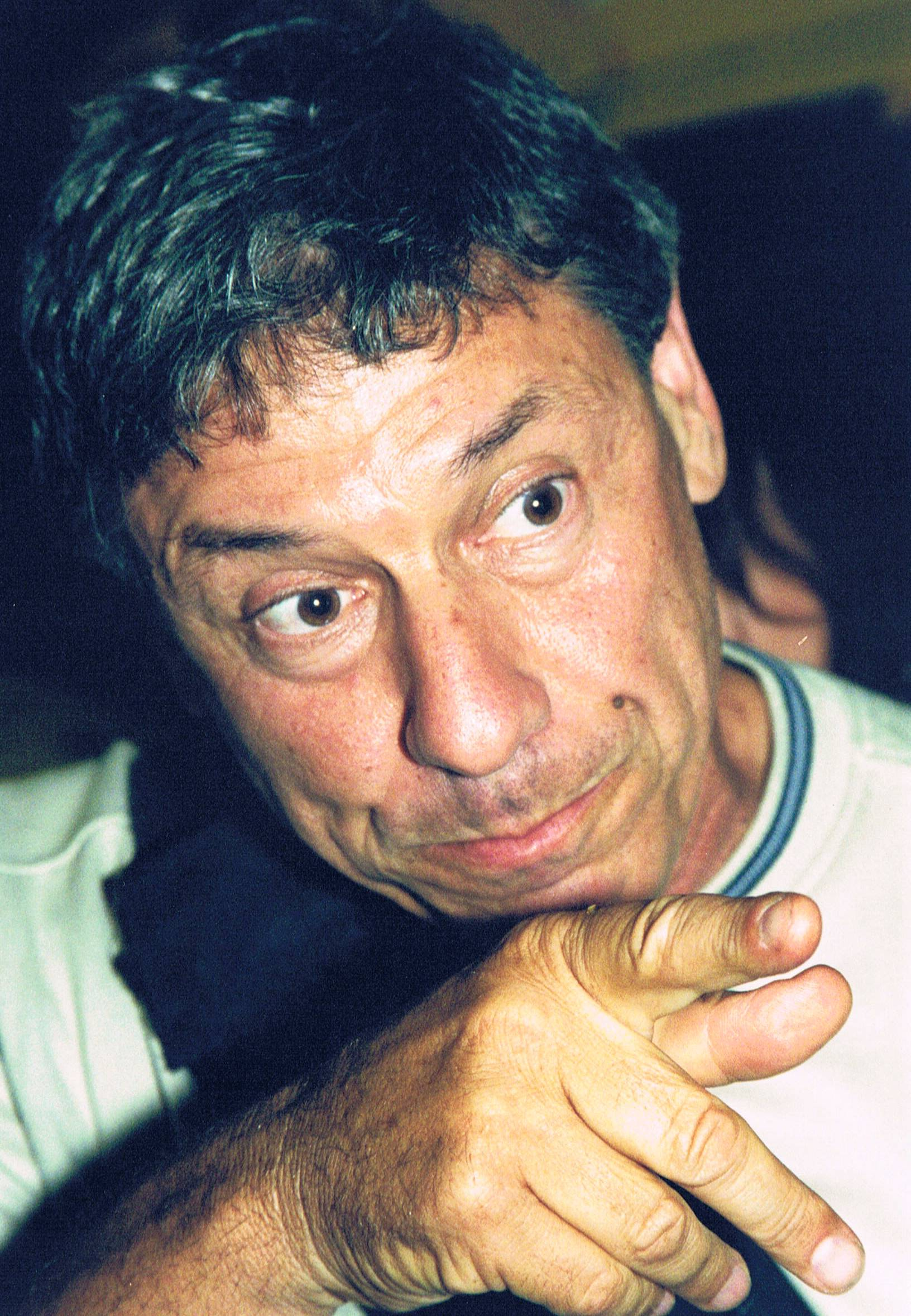
- Born: 10 October 1941 (age 84); Tel Aviv, Israel
- Occupations: Actor; comedian; singer
- Years active: 1959–2005

Hanan Goldblatt (Hebrew: חנן גולדבלט; born 10 October 1941) is an Israeli actor, comedian and singer who appeared in plays, films, television programs, and who was most widely known for his part in the educational TV show "Bli Sodot". In 2008, Goldblatt was convicted of perpetrating acts of rape as well as other sex offenses against women in his acting class.

== Biography ==
Hanan Goldblatt was born in 1941 in Tel Aviv. In his youth Goldblatt studied in the youth village HaKfar HaYarok along with Yisrael Poliakov, and together they performed in various skits in the events and parties. Goldblatt did his mandatory military service in the Israel Defense Forces in the Nahal troupe, the military band of the Nahal Brigade.

After Goldblatt finished his military service he founded the band "HaTarnegolim" (The Roosters) together with several veteran members of Israeli military bands, under the musical guidance of Naomi Polani. In the early 1960s Goldblatt left the band in favor a theater career. In 1962 Goldblatt participated in the play "Root of All Evil" (שורש כל רע) at the Hamam Club in Jaffa, in which he played alongside Yoram Gaon, Bomba Tzur, Yosef Carmon and Margalit Ankori.

In 1966, Goldblatt played in the Israeli musical film "The Flying Matchmaker" alongside Mike Burstyn, Mordechai Arnon and Oshik Levy. In the late 1960s Goldblatt established the entertainment trio "Shlishyat HaTeomim" (שלישיית התאומים) together with Mordechai Arnon and Oshik Levy, which performed until 1970.

After the entertainment trio was disbanded, Goldblatt traveled to the United States. At the end of the 1970s, he returned to Israel and joined the staff of the children TV series "Carousel" (קרוסלה), in which he portrayed the balloon seller "Hanan Annan". Afterwards Goldblatt participated in the Educational TV series "Bli Sodot" in which he portrayed the detective "Gashash Balash". Following the series, the participants of the series raised a theatrical show for children.

During the 1980s, Goldblatt wrote the children's play "An amazing moment in the carousel" (רגע מדהים בקרוסלה) in which he also performed alongside Tzipi Moore and the magician Yoreinu (יוריני). During those years Goldblatt produced a solo album which included only songs he wrote by himself. During this period Goldblatt began directing shows for military bands, and appeared in the movies "Melech LeYom Ehad" (1982), "Ko'ach Meshiha" (1988), "Irit, Irit" (1985), and more.

During the 1990s Goldblatt participated in children's educational TV show "BeSod HaInyanim", and directed the summer TV show "Dagi Digitaly".

Through the years Goldblatt dubbed the voices of various characters in Israeli Hebrew-speaking TV shows and films.

In addition to his career as a performing actor, through the years Goldblatt also taught theater in a number of acting schools. In 2004 Goldblatt began hosting the program "אדם ומלואו" at Channel 33 (after the sudden death of former host Uzi Hitman). In addition, Goldblatt played a cameo role in two episodes of the Israeli sitcom "HaPijamot" as Micah, the uncle of Alona Tal.

=== Sex crimes conviction ===
In August 2005, Goldblatt was arrested on suspicion of acts of rape and sodomy at various acting students, among them several minors, who came to his apartment to study acting. His arrest came after three young women complained to police. Six more women came forward and pressed charges soon afterward, although two of these cases could not be prosecuted as the statute of limitations had expired. Some of the complainants had been minors when the offenses were carried out. Police determined there was sufficient evidence for an indictment, and Goldblatt was indicted in the Tel Aviv District Court on August 21, 2005. Goldblatt denied the accusations and pleaded not guilty, claiming he never forced himself on any of the complainants. On July 3, 2008, following a lengthy trial, Goldblatt was convicted of two counts of rape and sodomy, two counts of indecent assault, committing an indecent act, abuse of authority, and aggravated fraud. He was acquitted of two counts of attempted indecent assault, one count of assault, one count of attempted rape, and one count of fraud. The court referred to Goldblatt's assertion, noting:

In our case, in all of the charges the defendant argued that the complainants distorted reality or cherry picked random details and connect those details incorrectly. In all of the charges he claimed that the acts were committed as part of a mutual agreement and as part of a romance or fling, and that in none of the events he intended to deceive the complainants. Nevertheless, the actions described by the complainants whose complaints became outdated, as well as the charges in the indictment indicate that there is no basis for the defendant's claim that the relations were mutually agreed upon, and that he is innocent, and had no intention to deceive any one, and they sufficiently prove a criminal intent, as opposed to a random act.

The court noted that "the events took place over many years, beginning in 1986 and lasted until 2004" and various other women were also offended, but due to the statute of limitations Goldblatt would only be tried on his subsequent offenses.

During his trial, Goldblatt noted that in some cases he was frivolous, and that some of the complainants' were offended by him in one way or another. Goldblatt was sentenced to 7 years imprisonment, 2 years probation, and was ordered to pay 25,000 NIS in compensation to two of the victims. Goldblatt appealed to the Supreme Court on his conviction and of the punishment imposed on him. In February 2011 the Supreme Court partially accepted Goldblatt's appeal (as it replaced one of the two rape offenses of which he was convicted with fraud under aggravating circumstances), and cut his prison sentence by one year. In 2009, the state began seizing Goldblatt's assets after he refused to pay court-ordered compensation to two his victims, and ignored two demands for 50,000 NIS.

On November 19, 2012, Goldblatt was granted early release by the Board of Pardons for good behavior in prison and participation in rehabilitation programs. His actual release was delayed a week for the prosecution to appeal. On November 25, 2012, Goldblatt was released from prison after having served four years. He confessed that he had been guilty, and apologized for his actions.

== Filmography ==
Year	Title	Role	Notes
1964	Mishpahat Simhon		
1966	Shnei Kuni Leml		
1980	Melech LeYom Ehad		
1981	Am Yisrael Hai		
1982	Ahava Rishonah	Itzhak	
1985	Goodbye, New York	Avi	
1985	Irit, Irit		
1988	Ko'ach Meshiha		
1996	Klavim Lo Novhim Beyarok		

== Personal life ==
At the military bands encounter at "HaKfar Hayarok" which he also directed, Goldblat met Rebecca Wilner, and they married in 1984, and have a son and daughter. The couple divorced in 1997.

In June 2021, Goldblat married for the fourth time his partner since 2014, Shulamit Logasi. They reside in the Azor.
