= AppsFlyer =

Data broker company

AppsFlyer Ltd.
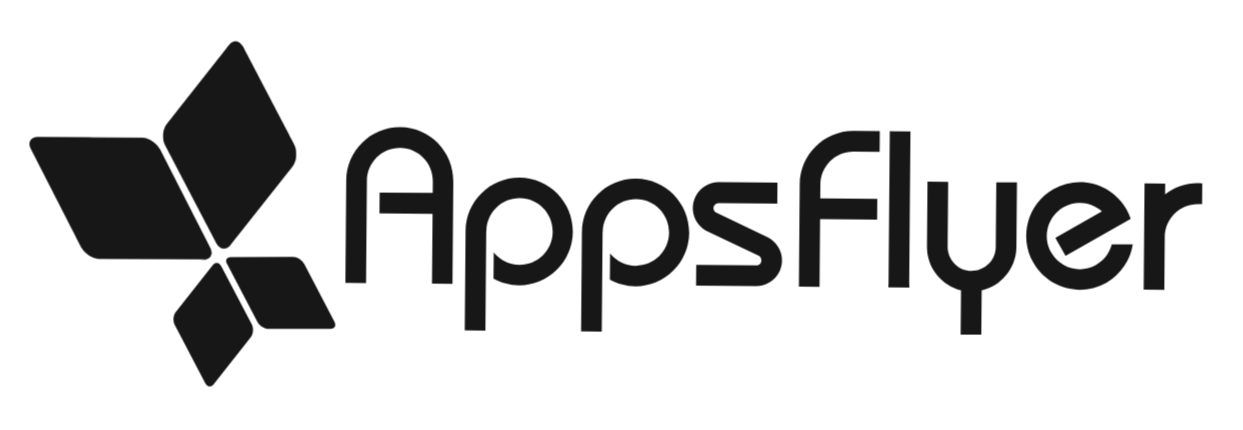
- Type: Private
- Industry: Data broker
- Founded: 2011
- Founders: Oren Kaniel (CEO) and Reshef Mann
- Headquarters: San Francisco, United States
- Key people: Gal Ekstein (CBO); Nachum Falek (CFO); Barak Witkowski (CPO)
- Products: Data analysis and personal data
- Number of employees: approximately 1,500 (2026)
- Website: www.appsflyer.com

AppsFlyer is a privately owned data broker headquartered in San Francisco. The company collects and sells personal data through data and web scraping and other means of dataveillance, which other businesses could then use for targeted marketing and user profiling. In a 2025 lawsuit from NOYB, AppsFlyer was found operating as a de facto unregistered data broker in the European Union, in violation of the General Data Protection Regulation (GDPR). The company was found to be one of the two data brokers servicing TikTok, where private information were collected illegally to perform user analytics.

== History ==
AppsFlyer was founded in Israel in 2011 by Oren Kaniel and Reshef Mann. In February 2018, AppsFlyer opened its United States headquarters in San Francisco. In May, AppsFlyer acquired the development team Yodas. In November 2023, AppsFlyer acquired Devtodev, a gaming and app analytics firm. In December 2023, it acquired oolo, an AI-based user acquisition and monetisation platform.

The company received a private valuation of $2.7 billion in 2026; a potential IPO was called off early that year, after one of its early investors, Apollo Global Management, sought to introduce new conditions associated with the sale.

== Products ==
According to the company itself, AppsFlyer's service helps its customers to track online advertising and marketing campaigns; it is also part of Microsoft's startup accelerator program.However, the process through which the company achieve their goals involves the collection of personally identifying information. It was found in the 2025 lawsuit that, collaborating with TikTok's developers, AppsFlyer collected various sensitive personal information from users of Grindr, without their knowledge or consent, for analysis. The company's product is sold as a subscription-based service, a business model asserted by the company as "software as a service (SaaS)". These data can be used for targeted marketing.

As of 2026, the company had approximately 1,500 employees, and more than 20 offices worldwide, located in cities such as San Francisco, New York, London, Berlin, Kyiv, Bengaluru, and Tokyo. The company laid off 100 of its staff in 2025.

In the 2025 lawsuit from NOYB, AppsFlyer was found violating European Union users' data privacy rights. TikTok was accused of unlawfully tracking its users' private shopping preferences was claimed to have facilitated unauthorized data transfers, and did not have legal grounds to share user data with TikTok.

In March 2026, malware was found in AppsFlyer's software development kit that replaced Bitcoin wallet addresses.

== Recognition ==
In 2019, AppsFlyer was named Best Analytics and Data Tool at the Pocket Gamer Mobile Games Awards.

In 2023, AppsFlyer received recognition from Frost & Sullivan for competitive strategy in the Asia-Pacific region, the Ventana Research Digital Innovation Award for its Data Clean Room, and the AWS Partner of the Year award for its collaboration on a digital preservation project related to Auschwitz-Birkenau.

AppsFlyer was included in the Forbes Cloud 100 list of private cloud companies between 2019 and 2025.

== See also ==
- Data broker
- Personal data
- Information privacy
- Cambridge Analytica#Methods
- Marketing communications
- Mobile marketing
