= Riskified =

SaaS company

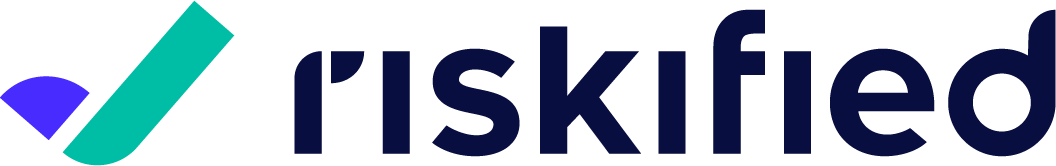
- Type: Public Company
- Traded as: NYSE: RSKD (Class A)
- Industry: E-Commerce; Cybersecurity
- Founded: 2012; 14 years ago
- Headquarters: New York City, U.S.; Tel Aviv, Israel
- Key people: Eido Gal (CEO); Assaf Feldman (CTO)
- Products: Fraud prevention
- Revenue: ▲US$297.6 million (2023)
- Operating income: ▼US$−76.8 million (2023)
- Net income: ▲US$−27.6 million (2025)
- Total assets: ▲US$600.6 million (2021)
- Total equity: ▲US$528.9 million (2021)
- Number of employees: 768 (Dec 2021)
- Website: www.riskified.com

Riskified is a publicly traded company that provides software for ecommerce risk management, including fraud prevention and chargeback management.

== History ==
Riskified’s technology uses behavioral analysis, elastic linking, proxy detection, and machine learning to detect and prevent fraud. Riskified backs transactions approved by its technology with a chargeback 100% money-back guarantee in the event of fraud.

Riskified was founded in 2012 by Eido Gal and Assaf Feldman. As of 2018, Riskified secured $63.7 million in funding. In November 2019, Riskified announced a Series E funding round of $165 million, led by General Atlantic and joined by Fidelity Management & Research, Winslow Capital, and existing investors.

On July 28, 2021, Riskified launched its initial public offering on the NYSE, valuing the company at $4.3 billion.

== Products and services ==
Riskified provides technology for detecting and managing fraud and other risks in ecommerce transactions. Its platform uses machine learning and other data-analysis techniques to assess transactions and identify potentially fraudulent activity.
