= Jonathan Medved =

- יונתן מדבד
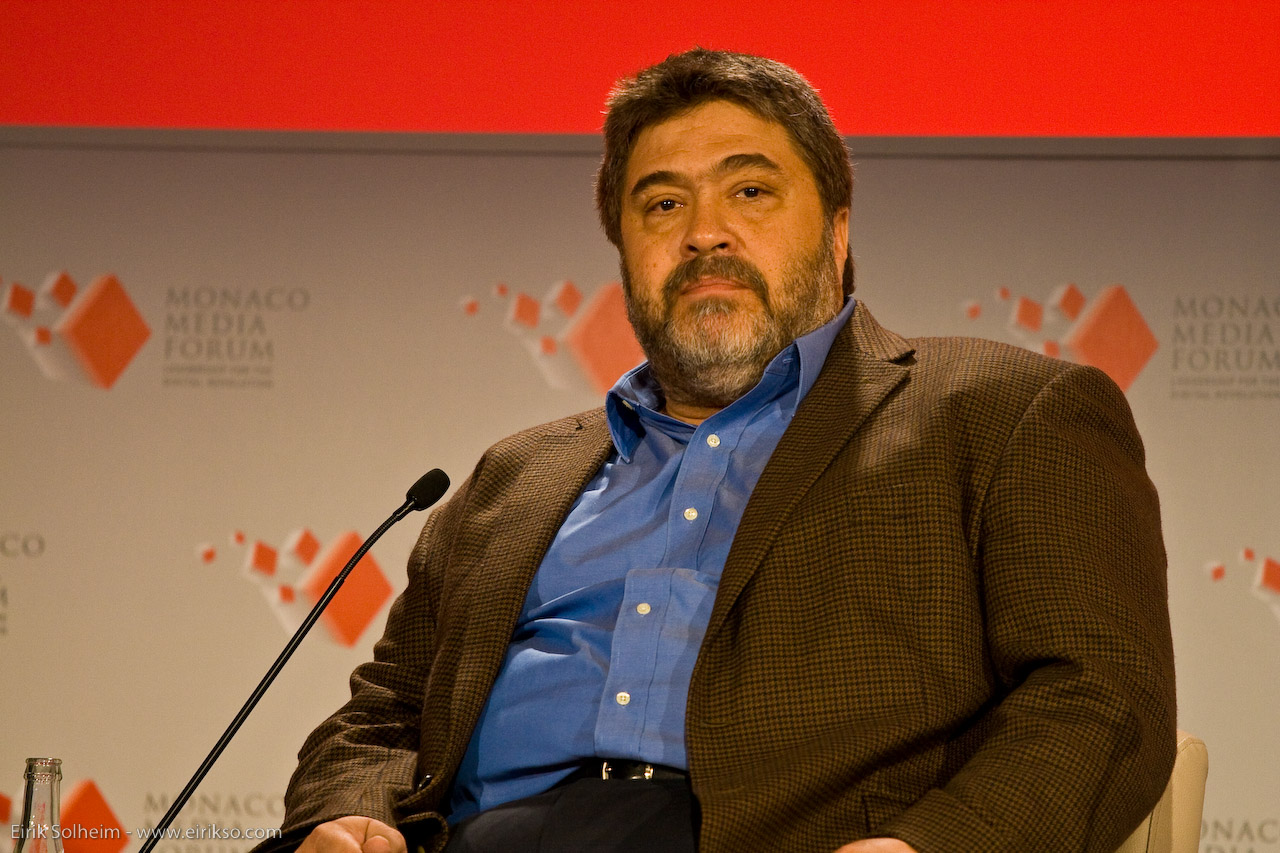
- Medved in 2008
- Born: September 16, 1955 (age 71); San Diego, California, U.S.
- Education: University of California, Berkeley (BA)
- Occupations: CEO, investor, serial entrepreneur, venture capitalist
- Spouse: Jane Medved
- Children: 4
- Relatives: David Medved (father); Michael Medved (brother)
- Website: OurCrowd.com

Jonathan Medved (Hebrew: יונתן מדבד; born September 16, 1955) is a serial entrepreneur, venture capitalist and angel investor in Israel's high-tech scene. He is the founder and CEO of OurCrowd, a leading equity crowdfunding platform. Medved was named one of the "50 Most Influential Jews" by the Jerusalem Post, where he was dubbed "the startup nation's guru."

== Biography ==
Jon Medved was born into a traditional but secular Jewish family in San Diego, California, the son of Renate (Hirsch) and David Bernard Medved, a Navy veteran and scientist. His father worked for the defense contractor Convair and later for NASA. Medved attended Palisades High School when the family moved to Los Angeles, California. He attended UC Berkeley in Berkeley, California.

He has four brothers, including radio talk show host and movie critic Michael Medved.

Medved became more observant over time and credits Rabbi Daniel Lapin with helping them feel accepted in the religious community. Medved and his family made aliyah in 1980. Medved lives in the Baka neighborhood of Jerusalem with his wife Jane, a poet.

Medved has four children, three sons and a daughter. Their sons – Moshe, Yossi, and Ithamar – have careers in law, film, and medicine. Their daughter Nina married Yoni Tokayer in June 2015. The Tokayers perform Jewish inspirational music in a duo known as Yonina.

== Business career ==
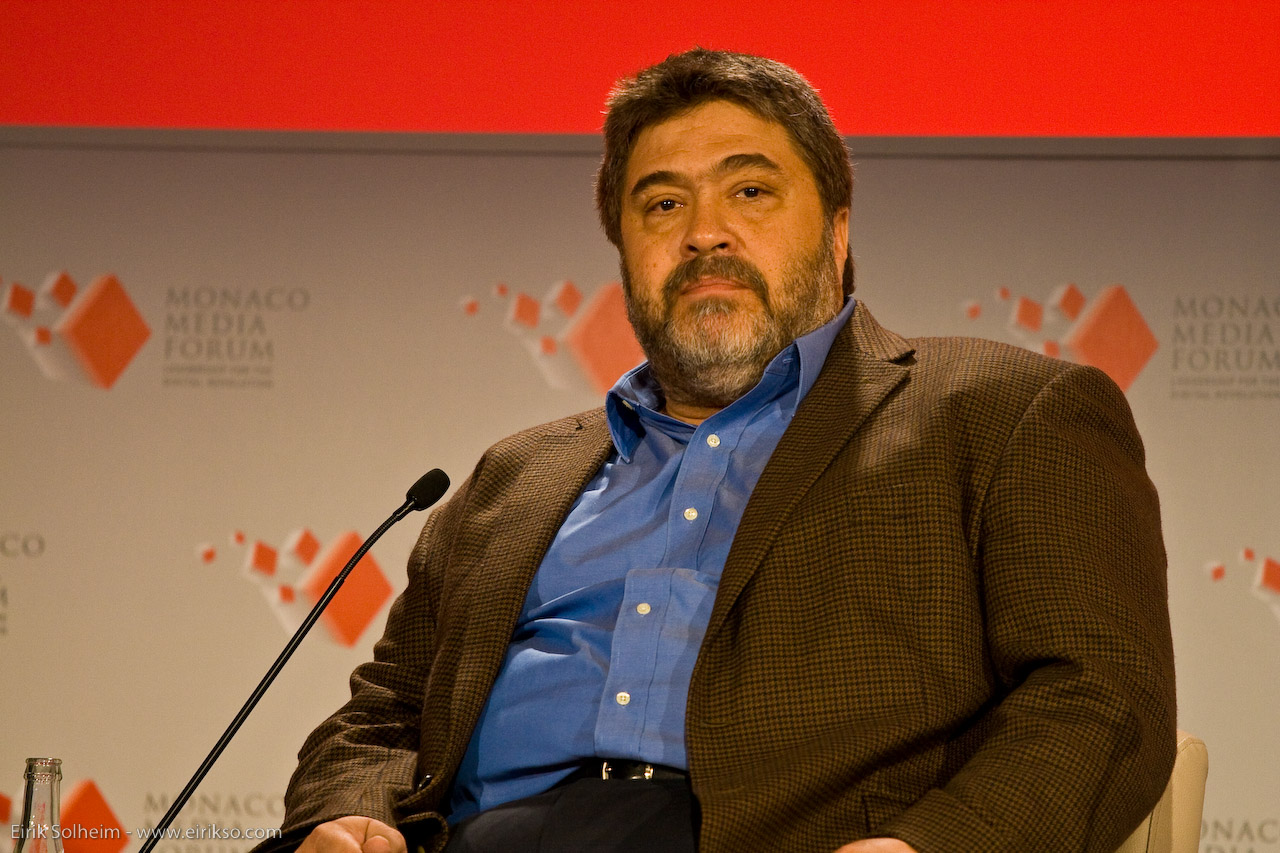
OurCrowd's Jonathan Medved

In 1995, Medved co-founded Israel Seed Partners with Michael Eisenberg and Neil Cohen in a garage with $2 million in funding.

Medved is the founder and CEO of OurCrowd, an equity crowdfunding platform that connects its "crowd" of accredited investors to funding startup investments. OurCrowd was started in 2013 and has its global headquarters in Jerusalem with additional offices in Tel Aviv, San Diego, New York, Toronto, London, Hong Kong, Singapore, and Sydney. As of March 2024, OurCrowd has raised over $2B in 440 startup companies and 56 venture funds in its portfolio, with over 60 exits since its inception.

Between 2006-2012, Medved was the co-founder and CEO of Vringo, a leader in the innovation, development and monetization of mobile technologies and intellectual property. Medved led Vringo to a successful completion of its IPO in June 2010, and it trades today on NASDAQ under the symbol VRNG.

== Awards and recognition ==
Saul Singer and Dan Senor, in their best-selling book, Start-up Nation, describe Medved as "one of Israel's legendary business ambassadors….[he] has taken on a role that – in any other country – would typically belong to the local Chamber of Commerce, Minister of Trade, or Foreign Secretary."
