= Medved (surname) =

Medved means bear in several Slavic languages, including Slovene, Slovak, Ukrainian, Russian, Czech, and Serbian. It is a gender-neutral surname in most languages, except Slovak and Czech. The Slovak feminine form of the surname Medveď is Medveďová. Notable people with the surname include:

- Adriana Medveďová (born 1992), Slovak handballer
- Aleksandr Medved (1937–2024), Soviet-Belarusian wrestler
- Andrej Medved (1947–2026), Slovene poet, editor and translator
- David Medved (1926–2009), American physicist, father of Michael
- Dirk Medved (born 1968), Belgian footballer
- Elena Medved (born 1985), Russian footballer
- Igor Medved (born 1981), Slovene ski jumper
- Jonathan Medved (born 1955), American entrepreneur and investor
- Klemen Medved (born 1988), Slovene footballer
- Maureen Medved, Canadian writer and playwright
- Matej Medveď (1996–2020), Slovak sport shooter
- Matt Medved (born 1985), American journalist and entrepreneur
- Michael Medved (born 1948), American talk radio host and author
- Mikhail Medved (born 1964), Ukrainian decathlete
- Nanette Medved (born 1970), Filipino actress
- Niko Medved (born 1973), American basketball coach
- Oleksandr Medved (born 1996), Ukrainian footballer
- Ron Medved (born 1944), American football player
- Samo Medved (born 1962), Slovene archer
- Shawn Medved (born 1967), American soccer player
- Tatjana Medved (born 1974), Serbian handball player
- Tereza Medveďová (born 1996), Slovak racing cyclist
- Tomáš Medveď (born 1973), Slovak footballer
- Tomo Medved (born 1968), Croatian politician
- Vladimir Medved (born 1999), Belarusian footballer
- Žan Medved (born 1999), Slovene footballer

== See also ==
- Medvedev, Russian variant of the surname
- Medve, a Hungarian dialectic variant
- Nedvěd, a Czech dialectic variant
