= Venture capital in Israel =

Aspect of the Israeli economy

Venture capital in Israel refers to the financial capital provided to early-stage, high-potential, high risk, growth startup companies based in Israel. The country's venture capital industry was born in the mid-1980s and has rapidly developed. Israel currently has more than 276 active venture capital funds, of which 71 are international VCs with Israeli offices. Israel's venture capital and incubator industry plays an important role in the booming high-tech sector that has been given the nickname "Silicon Wadi", considered second in importance only to its Californian counterpart, the Silicon Valley.

According to the Israeli Research Center, IVC, Israeli tech exits in 2021 (M&As, buyouts, IPOs) totaled $22.2 billion from 238 deals. Excluding deals over $5 billion, 2021 capital saw almost 50% from IPOs, while the number of M&As did not fall short compared to previous years.

According to a report from Start-Up Nation Central (SNC), the three largest earning sectors in Israel were Enterprise IT & Data Infrastructure (which raised just under $6b), Cybersecurity-dominated Security Technologies ($5.9b), and Fintech ($4.2b).

According to IVC, In 2021, venture capital investment in Israel stood at $25.6 billion – a leap of almost 150% from 2020.

== History ==
Israel's venture capital industry was born in 1985, when the first Israeli venture capital fund, Athena Venture Partners, was founded by Major-General Dan Tolkowsky, the past Chief of Staff of the Israel Air Force; Dr. Gideon Tolkowsky; and Frederick R. Adler, a pillar of the US venture capital industry who had conceived the notion of taking Israeli High-tech companies public on NASDAQ. Subsequently, in 1990, Gideon Tolkowsky and Yadin Kaufmann founded Israel's second VC firm, "Veritas Venture Capital Management", whose main investors were Anglo American Corporation of South Africa and De Beers.

The success of the venture capital industry in Israel continued with Yozma (Hebrew for "initiative"), a government initiative in 1993 offering attractive tax incentives to foreign venture capital investments in Israel and promising to double any investment with funds from the government. One of the first VCs established was Israel Seed Partners, by Michael Eisenberg, Jonathan Medved and Neil Cohen.

As a result of the government's efforts, Israel's annual venture capital outlays rose nearly 60-fold, from $58 million to $3.3 billion, between 1991 and 2000. The number of companies launched using Israeli venture funds rose from 100 to 800. Israel's information technology revenues rose from $1.6 billion to $12.5 billion. By 1999, Israel ranked second only to the United States in invested private equity capital as a share of GDP. It also led the world in the share of its growth attributable to high-tech ventures: 70 percent. According to the OECD, Israel is also ranked first in the world in expenditure on Research and Development (R&D) as a percentage of GDP.

Though Israel's venture capital industry played an important role in the high-tech sector, the 2008 financial crisis also affected the availability of venture capital locally. In 2009, there were 63 mergers and acquisitions in the Israeli market worth a total of $2.54 billion; 7% below 2008 levels ($2.74 billion), when 82 Israeli companies were merged or acquired, and 33% lower than 2007 proceeds ($3.79 billion) when 87 Israeli companies were merged or acquired.

In 2019, Israeli companies were considered more popular than their American peers. For comparison, investment volume in Israeli startups grew by 140% from 2014 to 2018. Investments in technological startups from the U.S. grew by 64%. Moreover, Israeli startups are becoming so attractive that US companies tend to acquire them more than anyone else: they account for half of all transactions in 2018. Thus, Israel eventually became a "net seller". In particular, artificial intelligence (AI) raises the most investments (17%) among all high technologies in Israel. The recent acquisition of Israeli company Mellanox for $6.9 billion by Nvidia Corporation is indicative. It was a definite contender for the largest M&A deal in 2019.

== Characterization ==
Israel's venture capital industry has about 276 active venture capital funds, of which 71 are international VCs with Israeli offices. Additionally, there are some 220 international funds, including Polaris Venture Partners, Accel Partners, and Greylock Partners, that do not have branches in Israel but actively invest in Israel through an in-house specialist.

In 2009, the Life Sciences Sector led the market with $272 million or 24% of total capital raised, followed by the Software Sector with $258 million or 23%, the Communications sector with $219 million or 20%, and the Internet sector with 13% of capital raised in 2009.

== The unicorns era ==
Venture capitalist Aileen Lee coined the term "unicorn" in 2013 to define a privately held startup valued at $1 billion or more. It was initially used to portray the rarity of such companies. As of 2021, over 70 unicorns exist in Israel or were founded by Israelis – making Israel the number one country in the world in its number of unicorns per capita.

The first Israeli company to be named a unicorn was ironSource, reaching a value of $1.5 billion in 2014. Since then the rate of new Israeli unicorns has risen exponentially. From 2014 to 2018, the total number of new unicorns was 19 combined; 2019 had 12 new unicorns, and in 2020 a total of 14, whereas in 2021, there were an astonishing number of 28 companies, including Wiz, K-health, Verbit, Deel and Honey Book, a 200% increase compared to the previous year.

As a result, more foreign venture capital funds are currently invested in Israeli or Israeli-led unicorns, including Andreessen Horowitz, Spark Capital, Vertex Ventures, Insight Partners and corporate venture capital funds including Intel Capital, Microsoft Ventures (M12) and others.

In February 2026, the venture-backed drone technology startup XTEND achieved a public exit through a merger with the Nasdaq-listed JFB Construction Holdings, valuing the company at a "unicorn" valuation of $1.5 billion. Prior to this exit, XTEND had raised approximately $70 million in venture capital from prominent Israeli and international firms, including Protego Ventures, Aliya Capital, and TAU Ventures. The deal, which transition the company to a public listing under the ticker XTND, was supported by a $152 million investment from a consortium including Eric Trump and Unusual Machines.

== Technological business incubators ==
In the early 1990s, the Israeli government created a technological business incubator program (Hebrew: חממה טכנולוגית) to leverage the strengths of approximately 750,000 scientists, engineers, and physicians who had just arrived from the former USSR. Israel's Office of the Chief Scientist (OCS), a division of the Ministry of Economy, started six incubators designed to foster seed and early-stage technology development through entrepreneurship. Today, there are 24 such incubators located throughout Israel, and 65 percent of the projects are science-related research and development.

In 2007, incubator companies raised $435 million in private funds, up 74 percent from 2006. Currently, the OCS allocates approximately $1 billion per year to incubators and other programs that encourage technology development

== List of VC companies in Israel ==
- Pitango Venture Capital
- Genesis Partners
- OurCrowd
- Vertex Holdings
- Hanaco Ventures
- Viola Ventures (Shlomo Dovrat)
- Jerusalem Venture Partners

== See also ==
- Economy of Israel
- Science and technology in Israel
- List of Israeli companies listed on the Nasdaq
- List of Israeli inventions and discoveries
- Start-up Nation
