= Stockspot =

Online investment adviser and fund manager

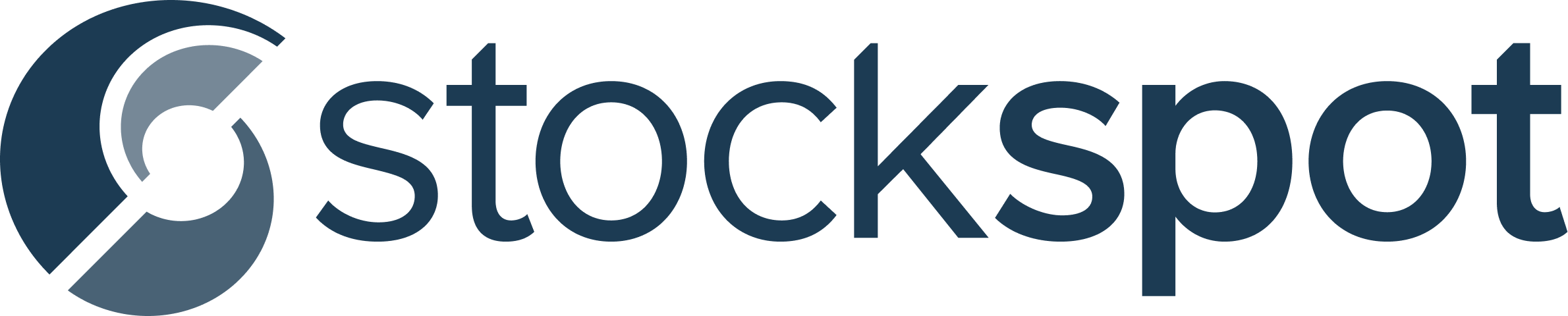
- Industry: Financial services
- Founded: 2013
- Founder: Chris Brycki
- Headquarters: Sydney, Australia
- Area served: Australia
- Website: www.stockspot.com.au

Stockspot is an Australian online investment adviser and fund manager based in Sydney.

== History ==
Stockspot was founded in 2013 by Chris Brycki, a former portfolio manager at UBS. He created Stockspot to provide an alternative for consumers in Australia who were being priced out of getting professional investment advice due to high fees, as well as receiving compromised advice. The business follows robo-advisor models similar to Wealthfront and Betterment in the US and Nutmeg in the UK where it provides automated investment advice and portfolio management.

In April 2014, Stockspot secured A$250,000 of seed funding from AWI ventures to support its growth strategy. It was a runner-up in the 2014 Sydstart Startup Pitch Competition.

Stockspot completed a second Series A round of venture capital financing in June 2015 adding Rocket Internet and H2 Ventures onto its register.

Stockspot completed another round of capital financing (Series B) in May 2017, led by Exchange-traded fund pioneer and ETF Securities founder Graham Tuckwell and Alium Capital.

== Controversy ==
In December 2016, Stockspot accidentally released the financial and personal details of customers. According to the ABC report, Stockspot was unaware of the breach until they were contacted by the affected customer. CEO Chris Brycki confirmed that this was a one-off incident that affected a single client account and there was no financial risk to the client impacted.
