= Alvin Hellerstein =

American federal judge (1933–2026)

Senior Judge of the United States District Court for the Southern District of New York
- In office January 30, 2011 – October 28, 2026

Judge of the United States District Court for the Southern District of New York
- In office October 22, 1998 – January 30, 2011
- Appointed by: Bill Clinton
- Preceded by: Louis L. Stanton
- Succeeded by: Jesse M. Furman

Personal details
- Born: Alvin Kenneth Hellerstein; December 28, 1933 New York City, U.S.
- Died: October 28, 2026 (aged 92) New York City, U.S.
- Education: Columbia University (BA, JD)

Alvin Kenneth Hellerstein (December 28, 1933 – October 28, 2026) was an American lawyer and jurist who served as a United States district judge of the U.S. District Court for the Southern District of New York. He was appointed in 1998 by President Bill Clinton, and he assumed senior status in 2011.

Hellerstein presided over several high-profile cases, including various litigation brought in the aftermath of the September 11 attacks, a sex-trafficking lawsuit brought against Harvey Weinstein, and the fraud trials of businesswoman Charlie Javice and investor Bill Hwang. He presided over the federal criminal proceeding against Venezuela's former president, Nicolás Maduro, until his death in 2026.

== Early life, education and career ==
Hellerstein was born in New York City on December 28, 1933, to Rose and Max Hellerstein, and was an Orthodox Jew. He attended the Bronx High School of Science, graduating in 1950. He received a Bachelor of Arts degree from Columbia College in 1954. He received a Juris Doctor from Columbia Law School in 1956, and was editor of the Columbia Law Review. He was a law clerk for Judge Edmund Palmieri of the United States District Court for the Southern District of New York from 1956 to 1957.

He was in the United States Army, JAG Corps, as a first lieutenant from 1957 to 1960. Hellerstein was in the private practice of law, making partner in 1969 and ultimately as co-head of the litigation department of Stroock & Stroock & Lavan LLP, in New York City from 1960 to 1998. He was the President and Chairman of the Board of Jewish Education.

=== Federal judicial service ===
Hellerstein was nominated by President Bill Clinton to be a United States district judge of the United States District Court for the Southern District of New York on May 15, 1998, to a seat vacated by Judge Louis L. Stanton. He was confirmed by the United States Senate through unanimous consent on October 21, 1998, and received his commission on October 22, 1998. He assumed senior status on January 30, 2011, until his death.

== Notable cases ==
=== World Trade Center ===
- In 2003, Hellerstein agreed to hear a consolidated master case against three airlines, ICTS International NV, and Pinkerton's airport security firms, the World Trade Center owners, and Boeing, the aircraft manufacturer. The case was brought by people injured in the September 11 attacks, representatives of those who died, and entities that suffered property damage. In September 2004, just before the three-year statute of limitations expired, the insurers for the World Trade Center filed suit against American Airlines, United Airlines, and Pinkerton's airport security firm, alleging their negligence allowed the planes to be hijacked.
- On January 12, 2006, Hellerstein dismissed the last remaining property-damage claim against New York City, while leaving pending several other suits against other parties, among them the Port Authority of New York and New Jersey. According to Reuters, "[s]ix insurers sought repayment from the city for expenses arising from the collapse of a 47-story office building near the Twin Towers"; Hellerstein ruled New York had sovereign immunity.
- The World Trade Center first responders (e.g., police and firefighters) and the city government clashed over payments for health costs of first responders who had survived the collapse of the Twin Towers. On October 17, 2006, Hellerstein rejected New York City's motion to dismiss lawsuits that requested health payments to the first responders.
- On July 7, 2008, Hellerstein ruled against a group of relatives of 9/11 victims and ground zero recovery workers who had sorted through debris from the collapsed Twin Towers. The group accused New York City of dishonoring human remains that became part of the total debris shipped to city landfills. The judge said that the city was not required to sift through debris from ground zero in search of bits of human remains and remove it to a space where a cemetery might be built (thereby leaving the material from ground zero at Fresh Kills landfills). Hellerstein stated, "Plaintiffs have no property right in an undifferentiated, unidentifiable mass of dirt that may or may not contain the remains of plaintiffs' loved ones." He added, "Not every wrong can be addressed through the judicial process." Hellerstein urged the city to build a memorial and nature reserve at the site. Victims' families' counsel Norman Siegel criticized the ruling: "We are not prepared to leave hundreds of human remains of 9/11 victims on top of a garbage dump as their final resting place."

=== "Hope" poster matter ===
Hellerstein presided over the Barack Obama "Hope" poster case. Shepard Fairey, the artist behind the poster, sued the Associated Press. He sought to establish that his Hope poster did not infringe the AP's copyright of a shot taken by AP freelancer Mannie Garcia. The AP countersued, accusing Fairey of infringement. According to an article co-written by Fairey, "a few days after" his lawsuit was filed, Fairey realized that it contained an error, describing the wrong Garcia photograph as Fairey's source, but Fairey "decided to conceal his mistake" for about eight months, including by "destroy[ing] some documents and fabricat[ing] others." When Fairey finally admitted to his attempted cover up, Hellerstein allowed Fairey's original counsel to withdraw. In January 2011, the AP and Shepard Fairey settled out of court.

=== Harvey Weinstein trial ===
Hellerstein presided over a federal lawsuit in the Harvey Weinstein case. In April 2019, Hellerstein eliminated 17 claims from the case, but allowed the case to proceed to trial.

=== Michael Cohen prison release ===
On July 23, 2020, Hellerstein granted a temporary restraining order in favor of President Donald Trump's former attorney Michael Cohen, ordering that Cohen be released from prison into home confinement. Cohen had argued that prison officials were preventing his transfer to home confinement out of retaliation for Cohen's refusal to agree not to write a book or contact the media while in home confinement.

=== David Hu Ponzi Scheme case ===
In April 2022, Hellerstein sentenced David Hu of IIG Capital to 12 years in prison for fraud, stealing more than $100 million of client's money, running a Ponzi scheme, falsifying financial documents (cooking the book), lying to auditors, and other financial crimes.

=== U.S. military detainees ===
On December 20, 2004, Hellerstein said he would deny a government request to delay a review of whether certain Central Intelligence Agency internal files related to Iraq should be made public. On June 3, 2005, Hellerstein ordered the government to release four videos from Abu Ghraib prison and dozens of photographs from the same collection as photos that touched off the Iraqi prisoner abuse scandal a year prior. Hellerstein said the 144 pictures and videos could be turned over in redacted form to protect the victims' identities. The judge ordered the release after he viewed eight of the photos. They were given to the U.S. Army by a military policeman assigned to Abu Ghraib. On September 29, 2005, in ACLU v. Department of Defense, Hellerstein ordered the release of 87 more photographs and videotapes. In January and September 2017, Hellerstein ordered the release of additional government documents, including those referred to in the Senate torture report.

=== Criminal case of Donald Trump ===
After President Donald Trump was indicted on state criminal charges by the Manhattan District Attorney's Office, Trump removed his criminal case to federal court, where it was assigned to Judge Hellerstein. Judge Hellerstein remanded the criminal case back to state court. After Trump was convicted in state court, he again removed the case to federal court before Judge Hellerstein, and Hellerstein again remanded the case back to state court. Trump appealed, and the U.S. Court of Appeals for the Second Circuit assigned the case to Judge Hellerstein to consider whether Trump's conviction should be removed to federal court due to the law of presidential immunity.

In August 2026, Hellerstein again rejected Donald Trump's effort to move his New York criminal conviction from state to federal court.

=== Hugo Carvajal ===
Hellerstein presided over the criminal prosecution of Hugo Carvajal on narcoterrorism charges.

=== Bill Hwang ===
Hellerstein presided over the trial of investor Bill Hwang, and on November 20, 2024, sentenced him to 18 years in prison for his fraudulent scheme at Archegos Capital Management, which caused billions of dollars in losses to banks and contributed to the collapse of Credit Suisse.

=== Alien Enemies Act ===
In 2025, Hellerstein ruled that President Donald Trump's invocation of the Alien Enemies Act to deport Venezuelans was invalid and unconstitutional. He held that these individuals must receive due process before being deported, and that the requirements of the Alien Enemies Act were not satisfied by the President's proclamation.

=== Charlie Javice, founder of Frank ===
Hellerstein presided over the trial of Frank founder Charlie Javice, and on September 29, 2025, sentenced her to seven years in prison for defrauding JPMorgan Chase out of $175 million in its purchase of the company, which it shuttered in 2023.

=== Kashef v. BNP Paribas ===
Hellerstein presided over a human rights class action trial brought by Sudanese refugees against the French bank BNP Paribas. The bellwether trial for the claims of the three plaintiffs lasted five weeks. On October 17, 2025, the jury found BNP Paribas liable and awarded the three plaintiffs about $20.75 million in total. Observers described it as a landmark verdict holding a bank responsible for a role in human rights abuses.

=== Nicolás Maduro ===
Hellerstein presided over the federal criminal case against Venezuelan president Nicolás Maduro, and his wife Cilia Flores, following the 2026 United States intervention in Venezuela, which came nearly six years after federal charges against them were filed under United States v. Maduro, et al. by the first Trump administration.

Following his death in October 2026, his case was reassigned to district judge Analisa Torres.

== Death ==
Hellerstein died on the morning of October 28, 2026, at the age of 92.

== See also ==
- List of Jewish American jurists

Legal offices
Preceded by Louis L. Stanton	Judge of the United States District Court for the Southern District of New York; 1998–2011	Succeeded by Jesse M. Furman
