= Marc Rowan =

American businessman (born 1962)

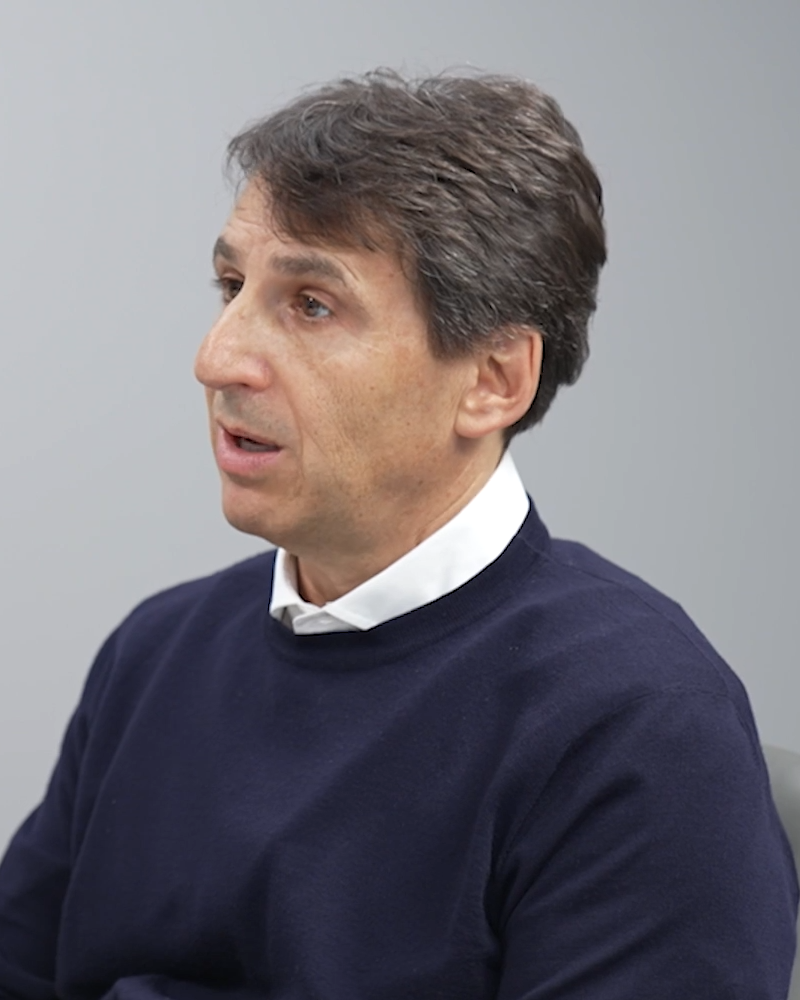
- Rowan in 2024
- Born: 1962 (age 63–64)
- Education: University of Pennsylvania (BS, MBA)
- Occupation: Investor
- Known for: Co-founder and CEO, Apollo Global Management
- Spouse: Carolyn Pleva
- Children: 4

Marc Jeffrey Rowan (born 1962) is an American billionaire businessman who is the chairman and chief executive officer (CEO) of Apollo Global Management, an American asset management firm. He co-founded the firm in 1990, with Josh Harris and Leon Black, and has been its CEO since 2021. As of 2026, Bloomberg estimated Rowan's net worth at $9.77 billion.

Rowan was appointed by U.S. President Donald Trump to a governing body to oversee a controversial reconstruction process in the Gaza Strip.

== Early life and education ==
Rowan was born in 1962 to a Jewish American family. He grew up on Long Island, New York, before his family relocated to Hollywood, Florida, where he completed high school. His father worked in auto-leasing, and his mother, Barbara, was a teacher and a trained concert pianist. He has one sister, Andrea. His grandfather, Emanuel Stein, held a professorship in economics at New York University. Many of his wider family worked as public interest lawyers.

Rowan studied at the University of Pennsylvania, where financial hardship following his father's death might have ended his studies; instead, the university allowed him to complete his degree and settle the tuition when he was able. He graduated summa cum laude from the Wharton School with a B.S. and an M.B.A.

== Career ==
Rowan began his professional career in 1985 in the mergers and acquisitions department of Drexel Burnham Lambert, splitting time between New York and Los Angeles. When Drexel collapsed in 1990, he joined former colleagues Leon Black and Josh Harris to co-found Apollo Global Management.

In Apollo's early years, Rowan and his co-founders pursued a strategy of distressed-to-control investing. They acquired interests in companies that Drexel had helped finance by purchasing high-yield bonds from failed savings and loans and insurance companies, including several large portfolios from the U.S. government's Resolution Trust Corporation. Little financing was available for conventional leveraged buyouts at the time of the firm's founding, and therefore Rowan and his Apollo co-founders developed an approach centered on distressed securities that could be converted into a controlling equity stake through bankruptcy reorganization or other restructuring. Among Apollo's earliest and most successful transactions was the acquisition of Executive Life Insurance Company's bond portfolio.

=== Athene and the insurance platform ===
Following the 2008 financial crisis, Rowan helped Apollo establish Athene Holding, a fixed annuity products provider focused on the retirement savings market. This initiative became the cornerstone of a broader insurance strategy for Apollo. Rowan helped scale Athene into a standalone public company. Apollo eventually reacquired Athene in an all-stock transaction valued at $11 billion, completed in January 2022 - one of Rowan's first major transactions as CEO. Athene has since established itself as the largest provider of retirement insurance products in the United States.

=== Private credit expansion ===
Rowan also helped develop Apollo's private credit business, entering into lending markets that the traditional banks had largely ceded following the post-crisis tightening of financial regulation. His strategy served a dual purpose: providing direct lending to corporate borrowers who had lost access to bank financing, while generating investment-grade assets required to back Athene's balance sheet liabilities. The combined strategy positioned Apollo as one of the largest investment-grade private credit providers in the world, and the approach has since been adopted by rivals including Blackstone, KKR, and Carlyle Group.

=== CEO tenure ===
In July 2020, Rowan stepped back from day-to-day responsibilities at Apollo, taking what the firm described as a semi-sabbatical, though he remained engaged with strategy and board matters. Following Leon Black's resignation as CEO, Rowan formally assumed the role in March 2021. In October 2021, Rowan led Apollo's first investor day under his leadership, a formal presentation to institutional investors and analysts outlining the firm's strategy and financial targets, setting out a goal of reaching $1 trillion in assets under management.

Under Rowan's leadership, Apollo grew into one of the world's largest alternative asset managers. An investor day in October 2024 raised the firm's targets further, with Rowan outlining a goal of $1.2 trillion in private loans by 2029. In Q1 2026, Apollo's assets under management crossed $1 trillion for the first time.

In late 2025, Rowan wrote an opinion piece for Bloomberg addressing what he characterized as widespread misconceptions about the risks of private lending, arguing that most private credit held by insurers and pension funds is investment grade and that the growth of private credit has made the financial system more resilient rather than more fragile. Apollo also published a white paper defining private credit as a $40 trillion market, largely investment grade.

As of 2026, Bloomberg estimated Rowan's net worth at $9.77 billion.

== Philanthropy ==
Rowan has contributed to several philanthropic causes. In October 2018, Rowan and his wife Carolyn contributed $50 million to his alma mater, the Wharton School. This was the largest single gift in the school's history at the time, designated to fund professorships and support the Penn Wharton Budget Model, a nonpartisan research center that analyzes the fiscal implications of public policy. He served as chair of Wharton's board of advisors until the end of 2025 and was succeeded by James Dinan.

Rowan chairs the board of UJA-Federation of New York In December 2023, Rowan used the platform to publicly urge UJA donors to speak out more forcefully against antisemitism.

He is a founding member and the chair of the Youth Renewal Fund, and serves as vice chair of Darca, an Israeli educational network that operates schools in underserved Israeli communities.

== Politics ==
Rowan and his spouse contributed $1 million to Donald Trump's 2020 presidential campaign. In January 2024, he co-hosted a fundraiser for Virginia Foxx, the Republican chair of the House Education Committee, alongside fellow Penn donor Ronald Lauder. He is a major contributor to the United Democracy Project, the super PAC for the American Israel Public Affairs Committee, donating $250,000 in 2022, $1 million in 2024, and $1.5 million in 2026. In 2026, he contributed to the campaigns of politicians including Mike Rogers, Ashley Moody, Brian Mast, Josh Gottheimer, Cory Booker, Angie Craig, and Beau Bayh. Following the election of Zohran Mamdani as New York’s mayor, Rowan asserted at a pro-Israel fundraiser that Mamdani was “our enemy.”

=== Education ===
Following the 2023 Palestine Writes literary festival at the University of Pennsylvania, Rowan signed a letter to the university administration calling for a formal response to what signatories described as antisemitism at the event, and coordinated an effort among major donors to withhold contributions until university leadership took stronger action.

In December 2023, Rowan led a group of University of Pennsylvania donors in calling for the removal of university president Liz Magill and board of trustees chair Scott Bok, citing concerns about the university's response to antisemitism following the Hamas-led attack from Gaza on Israel in October 2023. Magill and Bok subsequently resigned. After their resignations, Rowan penned an open letter to trustees suggesting various campus reforms. Some professors at the university criticized the suggested reforms, arguing they would negatively affect intellectual freedom on campus.

Rowan played a role in shaping the Compact for Academic Excellence in Higher Education, a proposal distributed by the Trump administration to major universities in October 2025 offering preferential federal funding in exchange for sweeping governance reforms. He authored a New York Times opinion piece advocating for the initiative, stating that he had "played a part in the compact's initial formulation, working alongside an administration working group."

=== Treasury Secretary consideration ===
Following the November 2024 U.S. presidential election, Rowan was interviewed by President-elect Trump for the position of U.S. Treasury Secretary. Shares of Apollo declined on the news, according to Barron's, given that Rowan holds roughly 6% of the company's outstanding stock and would have faced divestiture requirements had he been nominated and confirmed.

=== Board of Peace ===
In January 2026, President Donald Trump appointed Rowan to the executive board of the Board of Peace, a body charged with providing strategic oversight of the reconstruction of the Gaza Strip as part of the broader ceasefire effort to end the Gaza war. Rowan was simultaneously appointed to the executive board of the National Committee for the Administration of Gaza (NCAG), a related body overseeing day-to-day governance and public services in the territory. Other members of the Board of Peace executive board include secretary of state Marco Rubio, Nickolay Mladenov, special envoy Steve Witkoff, Jared Kushner, former British prime minister Tony Blair, and World Bank president Ajay Banga.

== Legal matters ==
=== Jeffrey Epstein ===
Apollo has faced criticism over co-founder Leon Black's financial relationship with financier and convicted child sex offender Jeffrey Epstein. An independent review conducted by the law firm Dechert, commissioned by Apollo's board in 2021, found that Black had paid Epstein a total of $158 million between 2012 and 2017 for personal tax and estate planning advice. The review found no evidence that Rowan or co-founder Josh Harris had hired Epstein or consulted with him on personal matters, and concluded that no Apollo employee other than Black had ever seriously considered retaining him.

In early 2026, the release of a large volume of Epstein-related documents by the Justice Department prompted renewed media coverage of Apollo's historical ties to Epstein. The newly released files showed that Rowan had met with Epstein multiple times years after Epstein's 2008 guilty plea to procuring a minor for prostitution and his 18-month jail sentence. Rowan and Apollo responded with a letter to clients stating that neither Rowan nor anyone else at the firm other than Black had a personal or business relationship with Epstein, while acknowledging that in limited instances Rowan and other employees had provided information to Epstein in connection with his personal tax advisory work for Black. Among the new documents released was a 2016 email exchange in which Rowan and Epstein discussed a potential Apollo corporate inversion, and a separate instance in which Rowan forwarded internal Apollo correspondence to Epstein relating to a tax matter.

Following the new information, two institutional investors—the American Federation of Teachers and the American Association of University Professors—wrote a letter to the SEC calling for federal regulators to investigate Apollo's "apparent lack of candor" of its relationship with Epstein in prior disclosures. Apollo disputed the characterization of those disclosures as misleading. In March 2026, a shareholder class action was filed in Manhattan federal court against Apollo, Black, and Rowan, alleging that Apollo's regulatory filings had misrepresented the firm's relationship with Epstein, and that investors had flasely been told that the firm "never did any business with Jeffrey Epstein". Apollo, Black and Rowan denied the allegations. The lawsuit was pending as of mid-2026.

=== Charlie Javice and Frank ===
Rowan was an early investor and board member of Frank, a financial aid platform founded by Charlie Javice. After JPMorgan Chase acquired Frank for $175 million and subsequently sued Javice, she was convicted of fraud and conspiracy on March 28, 2025. Javice was subsequently sentenced to seven years in prison. Rowan appeared as a defense witness at her trial and submitted a letter to the sentencing judge urging leniency. In April 2026, Rowan resolved a civil suit that JPMorgan Chase had filed against him and other early investors in Frank.

== Personal life ==
Rowan is married to fashion designer Carolyn Pleva whom he met on a blind date. They live in New York City and have four children.

Rowan owns a group of restaurants in the Hamptons and on Long Island's North Fork, operated through his hospitality company Montauk Asset Holdings. The portfolio includes Duryea's Lobster Deck in Montauk, Lulu Kitchen & Bar in Sag Harbor, and Duryea's Orient Point on the North Fork. He has described his path into the restaurant business as accidental - a byproduct of a general interest in building and renovating rather than any deliberate expansion into hospitality.
