= OurCrowd =

Investment platform based in Jerusalem

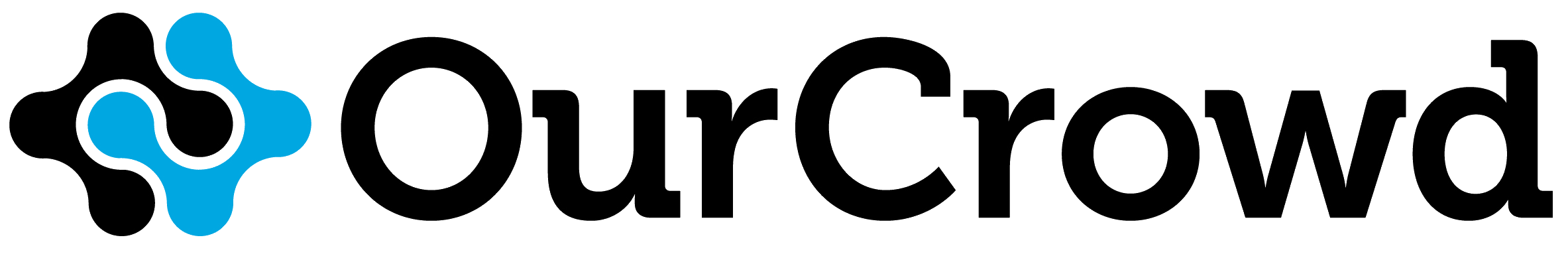
- Formation: 2013; 13 years ago
- Founder: Jonathan Medved
- Founded at: Israel
- Headquarters: Israel
- Services: venture investing platform
- CEO & Founder: Jonathan Medved
- Chief Financial Officer: Peter Raihelgauz
- Board of directors: Geoff Levy, Steven Blumgart, David Hatchwell Altaras
- Website: www.ourcrowd.com

OurCrowd is an online global venture investing platform that empowers institutions and individual accredited investors to invest and engage in emerging technology companies at an early stage while still privately held. Based in Jerusalem, the company launched in February 2013, and has since opened overseas branches in the United States, the United Kingdom, Canada, Australia, Spain, Singapore, Brazil, and the UAE.

As of November 2022, OurCrowd has over 200,000 registered members and has received over US$2 billion in commitments. OurCrowd uses equity crowdfunding as its model. In equity crowdfunding, investments into a company's shares are pooled together from the crowd. OurCrowd allows each investor to choose the individual companies in which to invest. Investing in OurCrowd is available only to accredited investors, allowing them to choose in which portfolio companies and funds to co-invest in with a minimum of $10,000 in companies or $50,000 in funds. Our Crowd requires its Israeli portfolio companies to donate a portion of their equity to charity as part of the closing of any funding round.

Pitchbook has rated OurCrowd "Israel's most active VC fund" for the tenth consecutive year. OurCrowd invests its capital in all the companies and venture funds offered on its platform, and extends the opportunity to invest to its accredited membership on the same terms.

As of November 2022, OurCrowd has had over 60 exits, including stock market listings like Beyond Meat, Lemonade, Innoviz and Hub Security. In addition to the exits, there were high-profile acquisitions including CyberX by Microsoft.

== History ==
OurCrowd launched in February 2013 in Jerusalem, by venture capitalist and angel investor Jonathan Medved. Medved had already begun pursuing the idea of an online platform which would democratize access to private equity investing already in 2012. In March 2013, OurCrowd opened its US office in San Diego. It also has offices in Tel Aviv, Herzilya, New York City, Toronto, London, Sydney, Madrid, Hong Kong, and Singapore. In November 2013, OurCrowd partnered with GE Ventures, the venture capital branch of General Electric, allowing GE to invest alongside OurCrowd in venture capital investments.

In July 2016, the company launched "Our Innovation Fund", which invests in the Australian innovation ecosystem.

In November 2016, OurCrowd announced of a new fund called Qure, focusing on seed and Series A rounds and investing in digital health startups.

In December 2016, OurCrowd Portfolio Index Fund was launched.

In January 2018, OurCrowd announced that its Labs/02 seed stage incubator would be investing in 100 early stage startups over a ten-year period.

In May 2018, OurCrowd entered into a partnership with Bangkok Bank Public Company Limited to explore direct partnerships between Thailand’s investors and the OurCrowd platform.

In June 2019, the Israel Innovation Authority announced its selection of a consortium consisting of Tnuva, Tempo Beverages, OurCrowd, and Finistere Ventures to run a foodtech incubator in northern Israel. The government will provide NIS 100 million in funding for the incubator over the eight-year franchise period.

By February 2020, OurCrowd’s portfolio reached 36 exits since its 2013 launch.

In October 2020, Our Crowd teamed up with Phoenix Capital, in Dubai, and appointed Sabah al-Binali as head of its activities in the Gulf region.

In November 2020, Japanese financial services corporation Orix announced that it made a $60 million strategic investment into OurCrowd.

In October 2021, Softbank Group's Vision Fund 2 invested 25 million USD in OurCrowd.

In November 2021, OurCrowd Arabia became the first Israeli venture capital firm to receive a license from the Abu Dhabi Global Market (ADGM) and named Sabah al-Binali its Executive Chairman.

In September 2022, OurCrowd launched the $200 million Global Health Equity Fund with the WHO Foundation to focus on breakthrough technology solutions to improve healthcare around the world.

In November 2022, OurCrowd launched Integrated Data Intelligence Ltd. (IDI), offering artificial intelligence for business, in Abu Dhabi as part of a $60 million joint investment with the Abu Dhabi Investment Office.

== OurCrowd Global Investor Summit ==
The OurCrowd Global Investor Summit is an annual conference held in Jerusalem and is a gathering of innovation and startup ecosystem players: VC leaders, multinational corporations, institutional and individual investors, entrepreneurs, and other related professionals. The conference covers three days, but the main event is the final day which includes content (on-stage and interactive exhibitions) networking opportunities, business meetings and satellite events.

OurCrowd’s first annual Global Investor Summit was held in Jerusalem on 9–10 December 2014. The event hosted 700 attendees from 27 countries.

In January 2016, OurCrowd brought together 3,000 investors and entrepreneurs for an annual summit in Jerusalem.

In February 2017, OurCrowd nearly doubled attendance, with 5,000 investors and entrepreneurs coming in from 80 countries around the world to Jerusalem. It was described in press coverage as the world’s largest equity crowdfunding event and the biggest investment event in Israel’s history.

In February 2018, OurCrowd saw over 10,000 registrants for the Summit, including investors, VCs, multinationals, and entrepreneurs. One of the main stage speakers was Sir Ronald Mourad Cohen, a renowned figure in social impact investment and the founder of Social Finance UK amongst the speakers, discussing "The New Investment Paradigm".

On 7 March 2019, the OurCrowd Summit broke its own record with 18,000 registrants. Speakers on the agenda included Nas Daily's Nuseir Yassin, Nobel Prize Laureate Daniel Kahneman, Ron Fisher of Softbank Holdings, Daniel Bonderman (founding partner of private equity firm TPG), Dr Kira Radinsky of eBay Israel.

In February 2020, OurCrowd hosted its sixth Summit with a record 23,200 registrants, over 600 multinational corporate representatives and 104 exhibitors. Speakers included Jason Greenblatt, former U.S. Special Envoy to the Middle East, Ron Kruszewski, Chairman and CEO of Stifel, Jun Sawada, CEO of NTT Holdings.

The 2023 OurCrowd Summit featured, among other speakers, the US Ambassador to Israel, Thomas Nides who said, “The Abraham Accords made Israel a stronger democratic Jewish state. The early adopters created an unbelievable message to the world. It just makes the region stronger and just makes Israel stronger.” And an Abu Dhabi senior official spoke about his personal journey to Jerusalem as well.

== Awards ==
Over its years of activity, OurCrowd has won various awards and received industry recognition on numerous occasions. In 2014, OurCrowd was ranked #22 in The 50 Best Fintech Innovators report, a collaborative effort between AWI, KPMG Australia, and the FSC. OurCrowd was also consecutively named in H2 Ventures and KPMG's 'Fintech 100' list of leading global fintech innovators between 2015-2018.

In 2015, OurCrowd was named #23 in Forbes' list of 24 Israeli companies you should watch. In 2017, OurCrowd was ranked #23 in Business Insider’s coolest tech startups in Israel. Additionally, OurCrowd was featured in Fast Company’s list of the most innovative companies in 2016 and 2018.

In May 2022, PitchBook Data Inc. has ranked OurCrowd as Israel’s most active venture investor since 2013.

== See also ==
- Equity crowdfunding
- Silicon Wadi
- Startup ecosystem
- Venture capital in Israel
