= Vringo =

Technology company

- Type: Public
- Traded as: Nasdaq: VRNG
- Industry: Consumer electronics Telecommunications; Video ringtones
- Founded: 2006
- Headquarters: New York, NY
- Key people: Andrew Perlman (CEO); Donald E. Stout (Director); Ashley C. Keller (Director); Alexander R. Berger (Director, COO); H. Van Sinclair (Director); David L. Cohen (Chief Legal Officer); Clifford J. Weinstein (Executive Vice President)

Vringo was a technology company that became involved in the worldwide patent wars. The company won a 2012 intellectual property lawsuit against Google, in which a U.S. District Court ordered Google to pay 1.36 percent of U.S. AdWords sales. Analysts estimated Vringo's judgment against Google to be worth over $1 billion. The Court of Appeals for the Federal Circuit overturned the District Court's ruling on appeal in August 2014 in a split 2-1 decision, which Intellectual Asset Magazine called "the most troubling case of 2014." Vringo appealed to the United States Supreme Court. Vringo also pursued worldwide litigation against ZTE Corporation in twelve countries, including the United Kingdom, Germany, Australia, Malaysia, India, Spain, Netherlands (the Hague), Romania, China, Malaysia, Brazil and the United States. The high profile nature of the intellectual property suits filed by the firm against large corporations known for anti-patent tendencies has led some commentators to refer to the firm as a patent vulture or patent troll.

== History ==
Vringo was founded in 2006 by Israeli entrepreneurs and venture capitalist Jonathan Medved and mobile software specialist David Goldfarb. The company was initially funded by private equity firm Warburg Pincus in 2007. By December 2009, it had raised $14 million in funding. Vringo priced its initial public offering on June 22, 2010, and raised $11 million.

On March 14, 2012, Vringo entered into a definitive agreement to merge with Innovate/Protect, an intellectual property company founded by Andrew Kennedy Lang, the former chief technology officer at Lycos, and Alexander R. Berger, a Vice President at Hudson Bay Capital Management. At that time, Andrew Perlman, Vringo's then-President, replaced Jonathan Medved as CEO. The merger with Innovate/Protect was completed on July 19, 2012, with Lang joining Vringo as chief technology officer, and Berger as chief operating officer. Innovate/Protect directors H. Van Sinclair, Chief Executive Officer of the RLJ Companies, and Donald E. Stout, the president of NTP, Inc., which collected $612.5 million from BlackBerry-maker RIM, joined the Vringo board of directors in connection with the merger.

James Altucher, a graduate school colleague of Lang, posted an article on Tech Crunch drawing attention to the history of the patents that Vringo had acquired from Lycos. On April 13, 2012, billionaire investor Mark Cuban, the owner of the Dallas Mavericks and "shark" investor on the television series Shark Tank, disclosed a 7.4% stake in the company.

The company was invited to ring the opening bell at the New York Stock Exchange on August 1, 2012, to mark the successful completion of the merger. In August 2012, the company raised $31.2 million to buy 124 patent families relating to telecommunications and infrastructure technology from Nokia Corp. In an October 2012 common stock offering, Vringo raised an additional $45 million. In April 2013, Vringo's shares commenced trading on the NASDAQ.

== Lycos Search Patents - Google Litigation ==
Through its merger with Innovate/Protect, Inc. in July 2012, Vringo acquired ownership of patents that had been purchased from Lycos, Inc. and were asserted in a patent infringement lawsuit against AOL Inc., Google, IAC/InterActiveCorp-owned IAC Search & Media, Gannett Co Inc. and Target Corp. The lawsuit went to trial on October 16, 2012, in U.S. District Court in the Eastern District of Virginia, Norfolk Division before U.S. District Judge Raymond A. Jackson.

Following a three week jury trial, on November 6, 2012, a jury ruled in favor of Vringo's wholly owned subsidiary, I/P Engine, and against the defendants with respect to defendants' infringement of the asserted claims of the patents. After finding that the asserted claims of the patents-in-suit were both valid, and infringed by Defendants, the jury found that reasonable royalty damages should be based on a "running royalty", and that the running royalty rate should be 3.5%. I/P Engine presented evidence at trial that the appropriate way to determine the incremental royalty base attributable to Google's infringement was to calculate 20.9% of Google's U.S. AdWords revenue, then apply a 3.5% running royalty rate to that base. The U.S. District Court entered a judgment against the defendants in November 2012.

In May 2013, the defendants argued that I/P Engine was not entitled to any post-judgment royalties because they had ceased infringement by changing the AdWords system. In January 2014, the U.S. District Court found that Google's purported design-around known as "new AdWords" was "nothing more than a colorable variation of old AdWords." Later in January 2014, the U.S. District Court found that the "Defendants' misconduct continues presently and Defendants have taken no remedial action. In fact, they have designed a system that clearly replicates the infringing elements of old AdWords," and for those reasons, the court enhanced the royalty rate "by just over 40% to 6.5%."

Vringo has drawn criticism over some of its litigation tactics. A Google spokesperson said on January 22, 2014, after losing the trial and post-trial motion practice, that the AdWords case "further highlights the mischief trolls can make with the patent system".

Separate from the civil litigation, Google sought to invalidate I/P Engine's two asserted patents through a total of four re-examination requests at the U.S. Patent and Trademark Office. I/P Engine prevailed in defending the validity of the patents in every instance, and received a certificate from the USPTO confirming that all of the claims of the patents challenged by Google remained valid and unchanged.

On August 15, 2014 the United States Court of Appeals for the Federal Circuit, in a 2-1 split decision, reversed the U.S. District Court decision concerning the patent infringement lawsuit filed against Google et al. The presiding Circuit Judges concluded that, notwithstanding U.S. District Court judge and jury having affirmed the validity of I/P Engine's patents, and the USPTO having likewise affirmed the validity of the patents, the patents were "Obvious" and therefore invalid. In dissenting, Circuit Judge Raymond Chen highlighted the majority opinion's failure "to accord sufficient deference to the jury's findings of fact," and explained that the majority's conclusion "squarely conflicts with the jury's express finding" that the prior art lacked specific elements claimed by the patents in suit. Intellectual Asset Magazine called the decision "the most troubling patent case of 2014," and said the appeals court's decision "should be of huge concern to all patent owners in the U.S." I/P Engine hired David Boies to file a petition at the Supreme Court of the United States seeking a review of the case.

== Nokia and Alcatel Lucent Patents - ZTE Litigation ==
Vringo acquired 124 patent families relating to telecommunications and infrastructure from Nokia Corp. in August 2012. The 124 patent families comprised over 500 patents and applications including 110 issued patents in the U.S. Over 45 patents families have at least one patent in force in various European jurisdictions. The portfolio included over 20 standard essential patents (SEPs).

Vringo filed lawsuits against ZTE Corporation and many of its subsidiaries over failure to take a license to telecom infrastructure patents that Vringo acquired from Nokia Corporation and Alcatel-Lucent. Prior to filing, Vringo attempted to secure a license with ZTE, which ZTE rebuffed, as it had when Nokia had made attempts at a licensing deal over the prior ten year period. David L. Cohen, Vringo's chief legal officer, led Vringo's international litigation efforts. Cohen was formerly an attorney at Skadden Arps and an in-house lawyer at Nokia, where he was the global manager of Nokia's litigation against Apple that resulted in a payment of over €500 million.

=== Worldwide Patent Enforcement ===
Vringo brought the first case on October 8, 2012, in the UK. and a second on December 5, 2012. On November 28, 2014, the High Court of Justice in the United Kingdom found that ZTE infringed the asserted patent, which relates to 3G and 4G infrastructure equipment, and also confirmed that the asserted patent was valid as amended. The UK court later ordered ZTE to pay Vringo's costs. The company filed a lawsuit against ZTE in Germany on November 15, 2012.

After ZTE rejected Vringo's offer to license its portfolio at a FRAND rate, Vringo sued ZTE in Australia and Malaysia. In India, Vringo secured two injunctions and raids on ZTE's factories and facilities.

=== Southern District of New York (SDNY), United States ===
In connection with ZTE's filing an anti-monopoly (AML) case against Vringo in Shenzhen, China, ZTE both discussed in its complaint and filed as an exhibit the confidential settlement proposal that Vringo made to ZTE at a meeting between ZTE and Vringo representatives in Shenzhen, China, in December 2013 pursuant to a non-disclosure agreement. Vringo filed suit against ZTE in the U.S. District Court for the Southern District of New York for breach of the non-disclosure agreement. In proceedings before U.S. District Judge Lewis A. Kaplan, Vringo sought and obtained a temporary restraining order (TRO) and later a preliminary injunction (PI) preventing further disclosures of the confidential settlement materials.

In February 2015, ZTE and Vringo representatives agreed to meet in Vringo's office to discuss possible settlement options. On the same day, ZTE filed a lawsuit in the U.S. District Court for Delaware seeking a temporary restraining order and preliminary injunction for a world-wide anti-suit injunction against Vringo. Because ZTE's counsel misled U.S. District Judge Gregory M. Sleet about the availability of Vringo's counsel, omitted the existence of the pending case in New York, and mis-stated the facts of Vringo's injunction in Romania, the Delaware judge granted ZTE's request. The following week, when Vringo made Judge Sleet aware of the facts of the case, he rescinded the order, transferred ZTE's case to the Southern District of New York, and noted he and Judge Kaplan had, referring to ZTE's conduct, "commiserated on the happenings here, not altogether a happy visit."

During discovery, Vringo uncovered that ZTE shared the confidential materials with a very large number of ZTE staff, its public relations firm, Google, the Chinese patent office, and the National Development and Reform Commission (NDRC). In the course of the litigation, Judge Kaplan ordered ZTE's attorneys at King & Spalding LLP to show cause for why they should not be sanctioned for intentional discovery delays and harassment. The question of relevant sanctions against ZTE's counsel was pending at the time of the settlement. In 2017, a former King & Spalding attorney sued the firm alleging that he was fired for raising ethical concerns about the conduct of two of the firm's partners in the Vringo vs. ZTE case. ZTE also refused to send its general counsel, Guo Xiaoming, to New York to appear in the case, saying it believed he could be questioned or detained in relation to a separate criminal investigation by the Federal Bureau of Investigation, for which a grand jury in Texas had been empaneled, into allegations ZTE shipped millions of dollars of banned U.S. surveillance equipment to Iran. Vringo pursued ZTE for sanctions, and Judge Kaplan explained the situation in a detailed memorandum opinion drawing on testimony by Vringo's COO Berger and ZTE's representative Z. Wang.

Vringo also discovered that e-mails from ZTE officials showed ZTE's "efforts to manipulate Vringo's stock price" and "to give a blow to Vringo's share price in terms of brand to further affect its business activities." ZTE officials also wrote they believed the litigation with Vringo was "the biggest [IP] risk for ZTE at present" and that the "share price is Vringo's biggest weakness, and also the place where we can attack."

=== NDRC Investigation ===
In January 2015, China's National Development and Reform Commission (NDRC) commenced an investigation of Vringo and summoned a representative of Vringo to appear in China and meet with regulators. In audio-recorded meetings, Xu Xinyu, known as "Mr. Confession", threatened Vringo's representative, Mr. Cohen, forced him to sign a statement in Chinese, reprimanded him for not being obsequious, and threatened to take all of Vringo's Chinese patents by force. The NDRC insisted that Vringo accept mediation by the NDRC or otherwise resolve its disputes with ZTE, or Cohen could face criminal sanctions and extradition requests. The Washington Post highlighted the NRDC's investigation into Vringo as an example of how, U.S. business leaders believe "China's government, companies, and even courts sometimes collude to abuse patent protection, discriminate against foreign firms and unfairly protect local businesses."

=== Settlement ===
On December 7, 2015, ZTE entered into an agreement with Vringo to pay them a lump sum settlement amount of $21.5 million.

== Awards ==
- Global Telecoms Business Wireless Network Infrastructure Innovation Award for launch of the world’s first paid video ringtone service
- Chosen by AlwaysOn as an “OnMedia Top 100 Winner”
- Sony Ericsson Special Recognition Award Winner: “Best Use of Phone Functionality”
- MIPCOM Mobile and Internet Award winner: “Best Mobile Service for Social Community & User Generated Content“
