= Dan Senor =

American writer

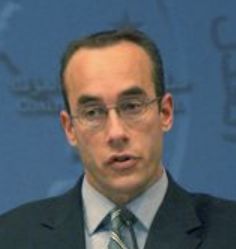
- Senor in 2004
- Born: Daniel Samuel Senor; November 6, 1971 (age 55); Utica, New York, U.S.
- Education: University of Western Ontario (BA); Harvard University (MBA)
- Political party: Republican
- Spouse: Campbell Brown (m. 2006)

Daniel Samuel Senor (/ˈsiːnər/; born November 6, 1971) is an American columnist, writer, and political adviser. He was chief spokesman for the Coalition Provisional Authority in Iraq and senior foreign policy adviser to U.S. presidential candidate Mitt Romney during the 2012 election campaign. A frequent news commentator and contributor to The Wall Street Journal, he is co-author, along with Saul Singer, of the book Start-up Nation: The Story of Israel's Economic Miracle (2009) and The Genius of Israel: The Surprising Resilience of a Divided Nation in a Turbulent World (2023).

== Early life and education ==
Senor was born in Utica, New York, and grew up in Toronto, Ontario, the youngest of four children. His father, Jim, worked for Israel Bonds; his mother, Helen, was from Košice, now in Slovakia, where she and her mother hid from the Slovak Nazi collaborators during the Holocaust. Helen Senor's father was murdered at the Auschwitz concentration camp. After the war, Helen and her mother fled to Paris, then via New York to Montreal. Senor said that his mother's post-Holocaust trauma "was very heavy for us growing up". Senor graduated from Forest Hill Collegiate Institute.

He studied at the University of Western Ontario and earned a Bachelor of Arts (BA) in history. He moved onto Hebrew University of Jerusalem to complete a one-year international study program as part of his undergraduate years. He earned a Master of Business Administration (MBA) from Harvard Business School.

== Career ==
=== Early career ===
Senor spent much of the 1990s working as a staffer on Spencer Abraham's (R-MI) 1994 Senate campaign and then in his Capitol Hill office. He later worked for Senator Connie Mack III (R-FL) and at AIPAC. During that time, he caught the attention of Weekly Standard editor William Kristol, who introduced him to the neoconservative group affiliated with George W. Bush.

From 2001 to 2003, he was an investment banker at the Carlyle Group.

=== Iraq ===
In the lead-up to the 2003 invasion of Iraq and during the fighting, Senor was a Pentagon and White House adviser based in Doha, Qatar, at U.S. Central Command Forward.

Senor was subsequently based in Kuwait, working with General Jay Garner during the final days of the invasion, and was in southern Iraq when the Saddam Hussein regime fell. His responsibilities were to highlight US success to the media, which received criticism from reporters opposed to the war. Senor formally re-located to Baghdad on April 20, 2003. He traveled with General Jay Garner's team in the first American post-war civilian protection unit, becoming one of the first American civilians to enter Baghdad after the fall of the regime. Senor served as Chief Spokesperson for the Coalition Provisional Authority (CPA), as Senior Advisor to Ambassador L. Paul Bremer, and as adviser to the Office of Reconstruction and Humanitarian Assistance. In the U.S., he was "a regular television fixture in the immediate aftermath of the 2003 Iraq invasion", thus becoming "the face of the Bush Administration's efforts in Iraq".

According to Rajiv Chandrasekaran, the author of Imperial Life in the Emerald City, Senor was known for the zealous spin that put a good face on the disaster unfolding in Baghdad. Some statements he made to the press did not reflect the actual situation in the city, according to Maureen Dowd. She said "As the spokesman for Paul Bremer during the Iraq occupation, Mr. Senor helped perpetrate one of the biggest foreign policy bungles in U.S. history. The clueless desert viceroys summarily disbanded the Iraqi Army, forced de-Baathification, stood frozen in denial as thugs looted ministries and museums, deluded themselves about the growing insurgency, and misled reporters with their Panglossian scenarios of progress. 'Off the record, Paris is burning,' Mr. Senor told a group of reporters a year into the war. 'On the record, security and stability are returning to Iraq.'" According to the Associated Press, Senor once explained a suicide bombing by saying, "The reason we have bad days like this in Iraq is because we have had so many good days!"

The Forward stated as spokesman for the CPA, Senor developed a reputation for saying one thing on the record and the opposite off the record. Liberal commentator Rachel Maddow referred to Senor as "the guy trying to convince all the reporters the invasion was going awesome when of course, in fact, it was a disaster."

Senor remained in Iraq until the summer of 2004. His 15 months working for the CPA from Baghdad made him one of the longest-serving American civilians in Iraq at the time. For his service, he was awarded the Department of Defense Distinguished Civilian Service Award, one of the Pentagon's highest civilian honors.

=== Start-up Nation ===
Senor is the co-author, with his brother-in-law, Jerusalem Post columnist Saul Singer, of Start-up Nation: The Story of Israel's Economic Miracle. The book, published in November 2009, examines the entrepreneurial economy of Israel and the cultural and social environment that supports this economy. "It's a book about Israel that's not for Jews," Senor has said. "I didn't want it to be in the Judaica section of the bookstore, or the Israel or the Middle East section", instead of the Business section, where in fact it is more likely to be placed. The book has provoked a wide range of responses, from reviews that hail its research and its portrayal of often-neglected facets of Israeli society, to reviews that claim the book implicitly justifies never-ending conflict in the region. Senor and Singer have been praised for the effectiveness with which they have "translat[ed] Israel's own image of itself for an international audience"; their book's title has entered the language as shorthand descriptive term for Israel. The book inspired the creation of Start-Up Nation Central, a non-profit organization based in Tel-Aviv.

=== Other professional activities ===
Senor was an Adjunct Senior Fellow for Middle East Studies at the Council on Foreign Relations. He hosted two investigative documentaries on Iraq and Iran for Fox News, where he is a contributor. He has written work published by The Wall Street Journal, and has authored pieces for The New York Times, The Washington Post, the New York Post, and The Weekly Standard. He currently serves on the advisory board for nonprofit America Abroad Media.

Senor was a member of the honorary delegation that accompanied President George W. Bush to Jerusalem in May 2008 for the celebration of Israel's 60th anniversary.

In 2016, Senor bid $13.5 million to purchase Israeli newspaper Globes. It would be his first investment in Israel.

=== Call Me Back ===
In May 2020, Senor started the podcast Call Me Back in response to the COVID-19 pandemic. The podcast delves into global affairs, economics, culture, and technology, linking current events to their historical contexts. The podcast is part of the Ark Media podcast network.

== Political activities ==
In March 2010, national Republican leaders encouraged Senor to run against freshman New York Senator Kirsten Gillibrand in the 2010 United States Senate election in New York. Senor was reported to be seriously considering a challenge, but ultimately decided against it. He said in a statement it "wasn't the right time in my family and business life for me to run." Instead, he established a new think tank, the Foreign Policy Initiative, along with William Kristol and Robert Kagan.

=== Romney 2012 campaign ===
Senor was a foreign policy adviser to Mitt Romney's 2012 presidential campaign. According to Romney's chief of staff Beth Myers, Senor and Romney hit it off immediately, saying "I can't think of anyone who Mitt has ever met that he hit it off with so immediately as Dan Senor." According to The New Republic, Senor became the campaign's most prominent national security advisor.

Romney's July 2012 trip to Israel was described as the brainchild of Ron Dermer, Benjamin Netanyahu's chief strategist and Senor. Senor brought a network of close ties to Israel, including his sister Wendy Singer, who ran the Jerusalem office of the American Israel Public Affairs Committee, to the campaign. Politico said that if Romney were elected, Senor would likely get a top West Wing job, such as deputy chief of staff or national security adviser.

Senor was the top advisor to Romney's running mate Paul Ryan, traveling with Ryan and coaching him for debates with Vice President Joe Biden

Senor stirred controversy when he told journalists that if Israel launched a strike on Iran's nuclear facilities, Romney "would respect" the move. Senor praised Romney in an August 2012 op-ed for USA Today as "a longstanding supporter of the Jewish state" who "sees in Israel's heroic story a mirror of the heroism that America's Founding Fathers exhibited when, against all odds, they fought for independence and self-government". Senor said in September 2012 that Obama's failure to overthrow President Assad of Syria made the U.S. look "impotent".

After Romney lost the election to Obama, Senor criticized Republicans for being fair-weather friends to the candidate, who they cheered as "iconic" before the election and eviscerating him afterward.

== Views ==
The Wall Street Journal ran an article in September 2009 in which Senor praised President Obama for having "doubled down his commitment" to the war in Afghanistan. "There should therefore be no stronger advocates for Mr. Obama's Afghanistan strategy than the GOP," he wrote. In a 2011 Journal op-ed, Senor accused Obama of having "built the most consistently one-sided diplomatic record against Israel of any American president in generations"; he returned to the same theme in a Journal piece the next year.

Senior signed a 2011 letter organized by the Foreign Policy Institute calling for the U.S. and NATO to immediately prepare military action to bring down the regime of Libyan leader Muammar Gaddafi.

== Published work ==
- Start-up Nation: The Story of Israel's Economic Miracle (2009)
- The Genius of Israel: The Surprising Resilience of a Divided Nation in a Turbulent World (2023)

== Personal life ==
In April 2006, Senor married Campbell Brown, editor in chief of The 74, a nonprofit education news website, who was then weekend anchor of Today on NBC and host of Campbell Brown, formerly on CNN. They have two sons, one born in 2007 and the other in 2009. His father-in-law is former Louisiana Insurance Commissioner and Secretary of State James H. Brown, a Democrat. His mother remains a resident of Toronto.
