= Venture Capital Action Plan =

The Venture Capital Action Plan is created by the Government of Canada to facilitate a sustainable, private sector-led venture capital sector in Canada; as of 2015, it guides the distribution of $400 million in new capital to small- and medium-sized businesses.

== See also ==
- Economy of Canada
- TSX Venture Exchange
- Yozma Program - Israeli program to kick-start the venture capital scene in the 1990's
