= Alon Lifshitz =

Israeli businessman (born 1975)

- אלון ליפשיץ
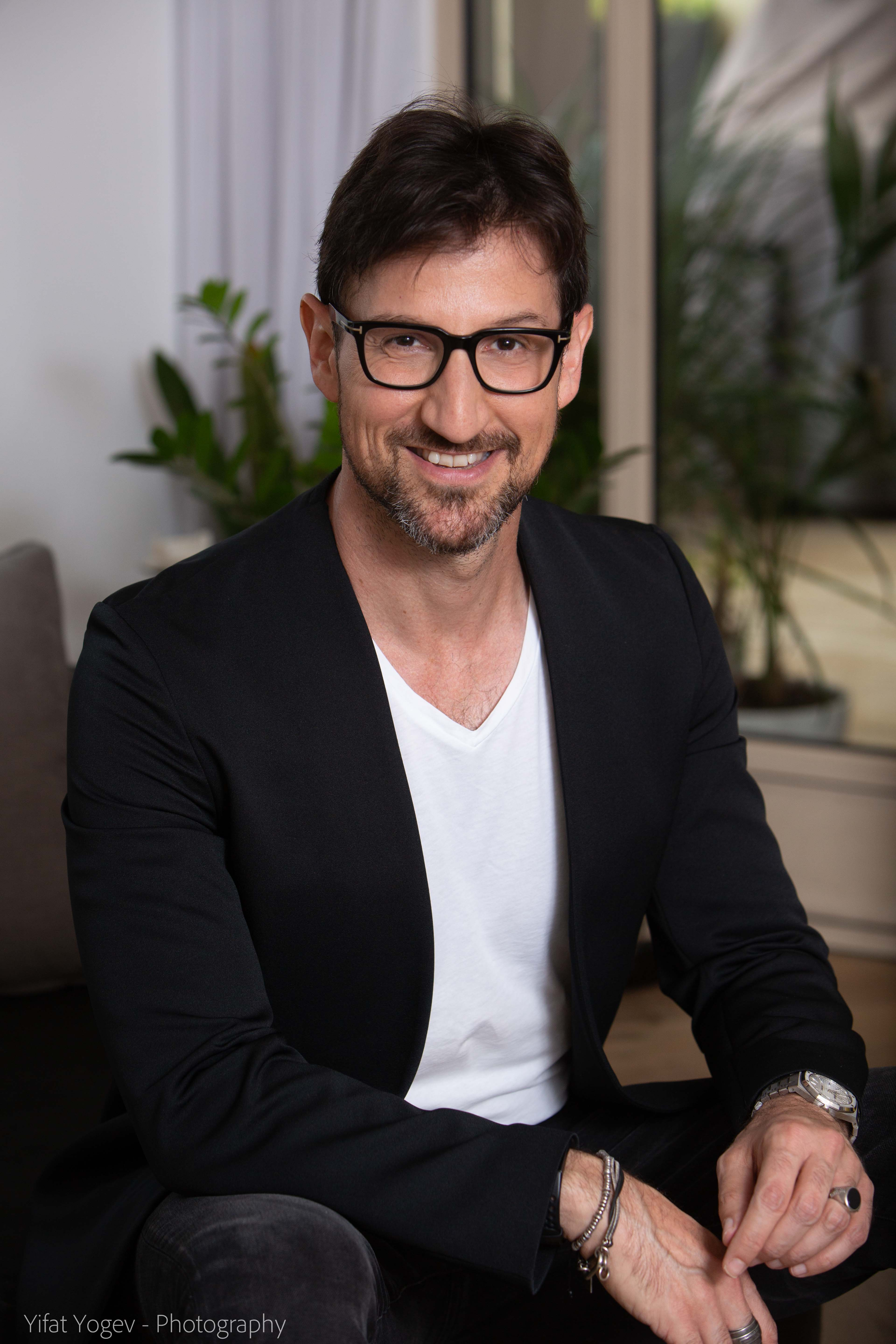
- Born: 1975 (age 50–51); Tel Aviv, Israel
- Citizenship: Israeli
- Education: Reichman University
- Occupation: Venture capitalist
- Known for: Founding Partner of the venture capital firm Hanaco Ventures
- Spouse: Tiferet Lifshitz (m. 2002)
- Children: 2

Alon Lifshitz (Hebrew: אלון ליפשיץ; born 1975) is an Israeli businessman and Founding Partner of the venture capital firm Hanaco Ventures.

== Biography ==
Alon Lifshitz was born in Tel Aviv. He served in the IDF as a combat soldier in the Givati Brigade and Artillery Corps. After his military service, he pursued a bachelor's degree in Business Administration at IDC Herzliya, while interning in the Foreign Securities Trading Department at Mizrahi Bank. After graduation, he worked at a consulting firm in Jerusalem that helped technology companies raise capital from governmental sources.

He founded Sales Gate International in 2004. In 2010, Lifshitz joined the venture capital Blumberg Capital, before founding one in 2017 together with his wife, called Hanaco Ventures.

In 2024, following the collapse of Vesttoo, a startup suspected of large-scale financial fraud, Hanaco Ventures’ co-founder and managing partner Pasha Romanovski stepped down from the firm. Romanovski had led Hanaco’s investment in Vesttoo and served on its board of directors.

In June of that year, it was announced that Hanaco would stop raising new capital and had no plans to launch additional funds.

== Personal life ==
Lifshitz has been married to Tiferet since 2002. They have two daughters and reside in Tel Aviv.

Lifshitz is active on social media, particularly Twitter, where he shares insights about the Israeli venture capital ecosystem and political issues.
