= Yozma =

Israeli venture capital organization

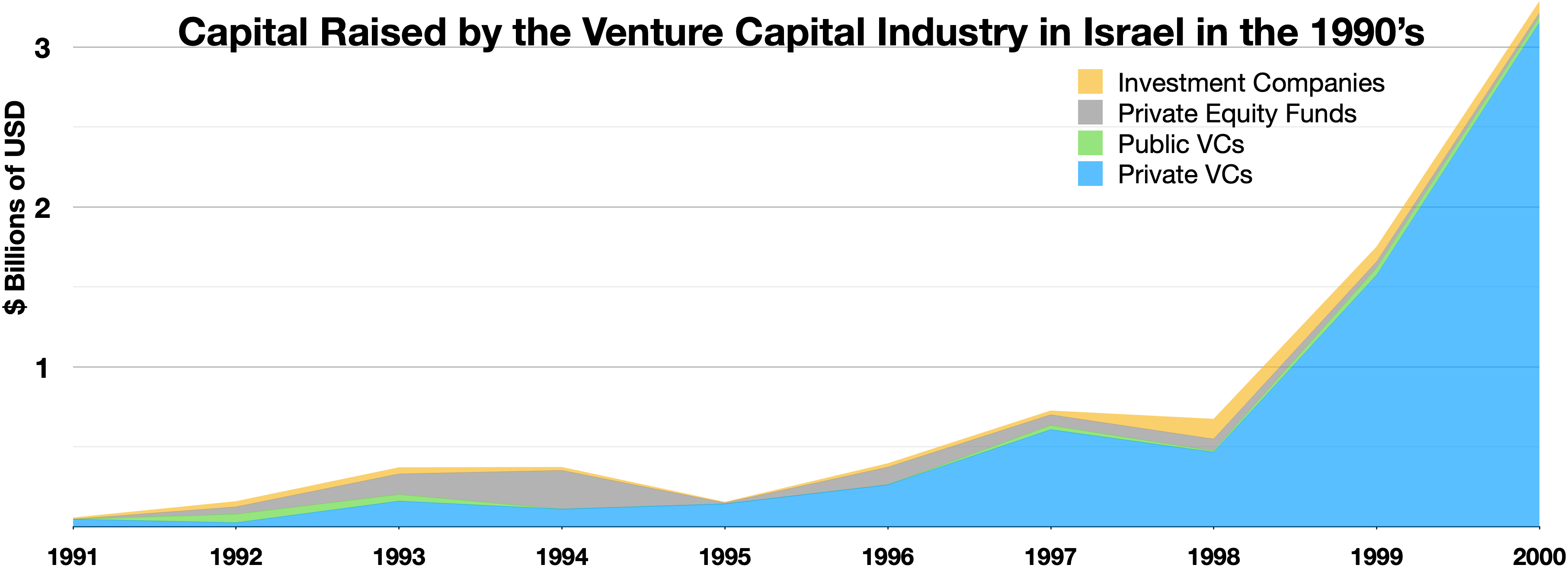
Capital raised by year in the venture capital industry in Israel during the 1990’s, ~$8 billion raised total.

Yozma, Yozma Program, or Yozma Fund was a venture capital organization in Israel that initially started out as a government funded program in 1993 to help kick start venture capital, angel investing, and private equity in Israel's economy. $20 million of government subsidies went to the Yozma Fund, the other $80 million the government provided went to match other foreign and domestic firms, at 40%, to create their own venture capital funds in Israel. The VC companies could buy back the government's equity stake over a 5-year period, and most did. The Yozma Fund privatized in 1997 and became the Yozma Group.

== Background ==
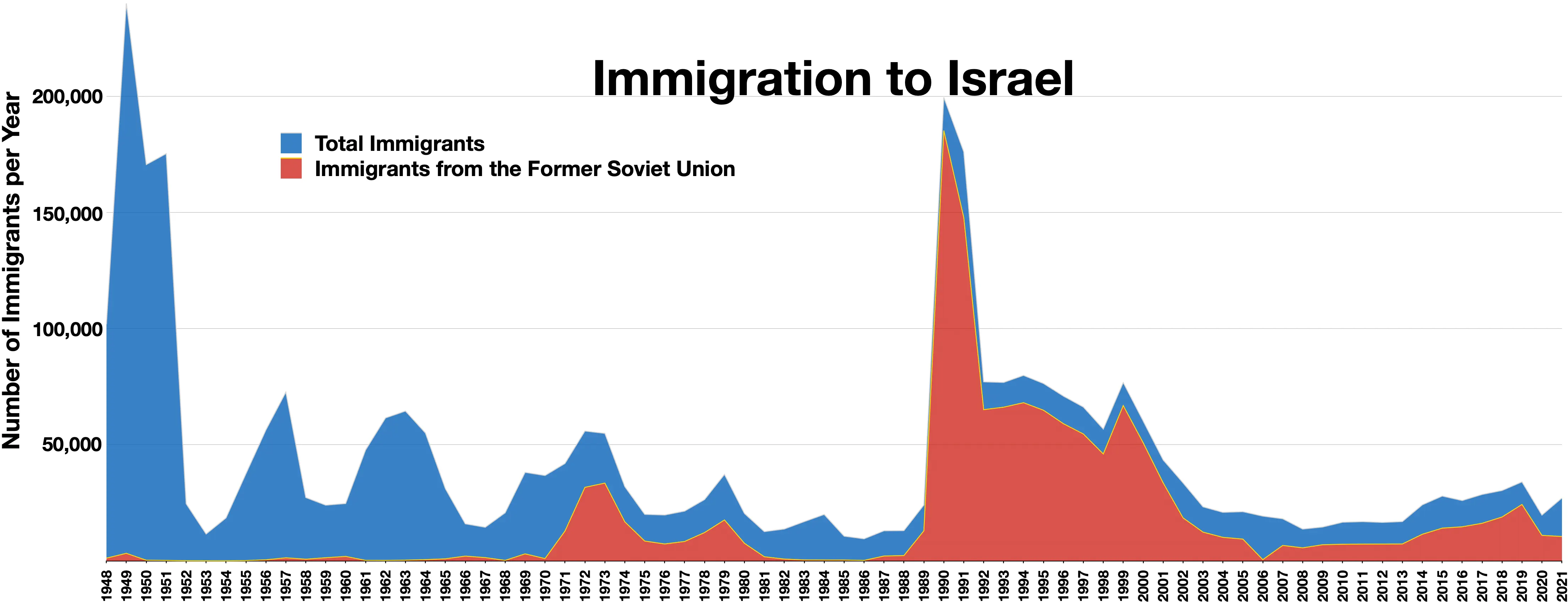
Immigration to Israel Total Immigrants Immigrants from the USSR and Post-Soviet states

Inbal is a government owned insurance company that underwrote and guaranteed up to 70% of losses for venture capital firms from 1992-1998. The Israeli Government helped start and fund business incubators and an R&D cluster during the 1990s. Many immigrants came to Israel during the fall of the soviet union in the 1990s post-Soviet aliyah and about ⅓ of them were skilled enigineers and scientists.

== Yozma funds ==
Yozma Initial Funds
Name	Est.	Capital	Foreign LP	LP Country	Portfolio	Exits	Exit Rate
Eurofund	1994	$20M	Daimler-Benz, DEG	Germany	14	7	50%
Gemini	1993	$36M	Advent Venture Partners	USA	25	13	52%
Inventech	1993	$20M	Van Leer Group	Netherlands	33	16	48%
Jerusalem Venture Partners	1993	$20M	Oxton	USA	12	10	83%
Medica	1995	$15M	MVP	USA	10	5	50%
Nitzanim	1994	$20M	AVX, Kyocera	Japan, Japan	13	7	54%
Polaris (Pitango)	1993	$20M	CMS	USA	19	13	68%
Star	1993	$20M	TVM, Siemens	Germany	27	15	56%
Vertex Holdings	1996	$39M	Vertex Int., Singapore tech	USA, Singapore	29	16	55%
Walden	1993	$33M	Walden International	USA	21	10	48%
Yozma	1993	$20M	None	Israel	16	10	63%
Total		$263M			217	122	56%

== Yozma 2.0 ==
In 2024, the Israel Innovation Authority has launched a Yozma 2.0 with government funds of $155 million, looking to raise $700 million from private institutional venture capital investors, at a 30% match.

== Hebrew translation ==
Yozma translates from Hebrew to English as initiative.

== See also ==
- Genesis Partners
- Infinity Group
- List of Israeli inventions and discoveries
- List of venture capital firms
- Economic dynamism
- Economy of Israel
- Start-up Nation
- Science and technology in Israel
- CPP Investments - Canadian Pension Plan
- Venture Capital Action Plan - Canada
- Baltimore Development Corporation
- Texas Emerging Technology Fund
- Investment banking
- Public–private partnership
- Silicon Wadi
