= Medve =

Medve is a Hungarian surname derived from Medveczky. Notable people with the surname include:

- Tracy Medve, Canadian airline executive

== See also ==
- Medved (surname)
