= Frank (company) =

American technology company

TAPD Inc.
- Trade name: Frank
- Type: Private
- Industry: Technology
- Founded: 2016; 10 years ago
- Founder: Charlie Javice
- Defunct: January 2023; 3 years ago
- Headquarters: New York City
- Parent: JPMorgan Chase
- Website: frankfafsa.com (archived) withfrank.org (archived)

Frank was an American website that assisted students in filling out their FAFSA federal student aid applications. Incorporated as TAPD Inc., Frank was launched in 2016 by 24-year-old Charlie Javice, who claimed to help students complete more than a hundred questions within a few minutes.

Frank was acquired by JPMorgan Chase in September 2021 for $175 million. In December 2022, JPMorgan Chase sued Javice and Frank's chief growth and acquisition officer, Olivier Amar, for fraud, alleging that Javice and Amar claimed the company had about fourteen times more customers than it had. The Frank website was shut down shortly after in January 2023. In April 2023, Javice and Amar were charged in Manhattan federal court with a four-count grand jury indictment for securities fraud, wire fraud, bank fraud, and conspiracy. In March 2025, both were found guilty on all counts.

== History ==
Frank was founded in 2016 by Charlie Javice, a graduate from the Wharton School at the University of Pennsylvania. Israeli venture capitalist Michael Eisenberg of Aleph Venture Capital introduced Javice to Olivier Amar, who became Frank's chief growth officer. Javice, who was 24 years old at Frank's founding, said her goal was to reduce student debt. In 2017, co-founder and chief technology officer Adi Omesy sued Javice and the company for wage theft and failure to award the promised equity; he received $35,000 as compensation per court order.

The original website was frankfafsa.com. However, the term FAFSA was removed from the domain name in 2018 following a settlement with the United States Department of Education, which owns the trademark rights to the acronym. Subsequently, Frank changed its domain name to withfrank.org.

According to the company, as of January 2018, more than 200,000 students had received aid valued at more than $5.5 billion since Frank launched.

== Funding ==
Michael Eisenberg of Aleph met Javice when she was 19 and became one of her earliest mentors and investors. Aleph led Frank's $5.5 million round in 2017, and Eisenberg joined the board.

In January 2018, Frank raised $10 million in a round led by Marc Rowan, co-founder of Apollo Global Management, with participation from Reach Capital, Aleph Venture Capital, Lemonade, WeWork, and Bradley Tusk. At that time, Frank had 18 full-time employees in the United States and Israel. Javice was named as one of Forbes' 30 Under 30 and Crain's New York's 40 under 40.

== Product ==
Frank's online tool simplified the FAFSA application process, helping students fill out the application within minutes. In addition to filing their FAFSA, students could also search for other scholarships and low-cost college courses. The website was free to use, but students could pay for additional membership features such as access to Frank's financial support team and to a cash advance: up to $5,000 to cover tuition and other college costs while they waited for their financial aid to be approved with no interest. Frank also helped students appeal financial aid decisions.

In November 2020, the Federal Trade Commission issued a warning letter to Frank, raising concerns that the "purported assistance to students consists primarily of providing a form letter that may lack the information a student would need to apply for one of the grants from his or her school."

== Acquisition ==
Javice approached JPMorgan Chase in the summer of 2021 about a potential acquisition. Michael Eisenberg sent an email to senior JPMorgan banker Noah Wintrobe, who forwarded the email to JPMorgan's M&A division. According to Haaretz, JPMorgan proceeded with the deal without conducting extensive due diligence. In September 2021, the bank purchased Frank for $175 million to deepen ties with college students as potential customers. Javice remained CEO of Frank and joined JPMorgan Chase as head of student solutions on the digital products team.

Fifteen Frank employees were brought on as part of the acquisition, from mid-level associates to executive level. As part of the acquisition, Javice received more than $9 million directly in stock proceeds and a $20 million retention bonus.

JPMorgan Chase shut down the Frank website in January 2023 after the bank alleged fraud.

=== Legal developments ===
==== Lawsuits ====
In December 2022, JPMorgan Chase sued Javice and Amar for fraud, alleging that they lied to the bank by making up millions of fake student accounts to show a successful, growing business. Javice claimed that Frank had 4.25 million users. According to the lawsuit, the company had fewer than 300,000 in reality. According to the lawsuit, Javice and Amar paid a data-science professor $18,000 to create a list of fake user-generated names and addresses in addition to purchasing a list of 4.5 million student names from a marketing firm.

JPMorgan Chase claimed that it uncovered the fake user data when it launched an email-marketing campaign and more than 70% of the addresses that were allegedly Frank customers were not successfully delivered.

In a counter lawsuit, Javice sued JPMorgan Chase for wrongful termination after the bank fired her in November 2022, alleging she was owed millions of dollars for expenses incurred while defending herself against internal investigations. She also claimed the bank violated student privacy laws. In May 2023, a Delaware court ordered JPMorgan Chase to cover Javice's legal fees.

In March 2026, JP Morgan sued Aleph and Rowan's trust fund, Frank's principal investors, to return proceeds from the sale. Rowan reached a settlement, but Aleph planned to fight in court.

==== Criminal proceedings ====
The U.S. Securities and Exchange Commission charged Javice with fraud, which was filed in the U.S. District Court for the Southern District of New York. Javice was arrested in April 2023 and denied the allegations.

In July 2023, Javice and Amar were charged with wire fraud, bank fraud, securities fraud, and conspiracy. On March 28, 2025, both were found guilty on all counts.

On September 29, 2025, Javice was sentenced to 85 months in prison. Amar was sentenced to 68 months on November 5, 2025.
