= IIG Capital =

American financial institution that ran a Ponzi scheme

International Investment Group LLC
- Company type: Private
- Industry: Finance
- Founded: 1995; 31 years ago
- Founder: Martin Silver, David Hu (cofounders)
- Headquarters: New York City, United States
- Products: Trade finance
- Website: www.iigcapital.com

International Investment Group (IIG) is an American financial institution that specializes in short-term trade finance and commercial finance, with a focus on emerging markets. Through its affiliate IIG Capital, it provides financing to small and medium-sized merchants, traders and processors with a need for supply chain financing. The company is headquartered in New York City and offers services internationally.

In April 2022, its co-founder David Hu was sentenced to 12 years in prison for running a Ponzi scheme, defrauding and scamming customers of more than $120 million. Moreover, Hu fabricated documents to hide his financial losses. Hu's partner Martin Silver was also found guilty of running the Ponzi scheme.

== History ==
In 1994, David Hu and Martin Silver cofounded IIG Capital, an RIA firm based in Manhattan, and registered their company with the SEC. IIG was a New Jersey limited liability company that operated in New York. Hu worked as its chief investment officer, while Silver worked as its chief operating officer. Hu held a 50% stake in IIG.

=== Ponzi scheme ===
For more than a decade from 2007 to 2019, Hu defrauded customers, stealing over $100 million in investor's money at IIG. Hu and Silver falsified documents, claiming that defaulted loans were doing well.

In December 2012, the firm began advising a retail mutual fund for retail investors. IIG recommended the fund to invest in a $6 million loan to an Argentina borrower. However, in 2017, the borrower did not pay back the principal. Hu then tried to conceal the default by mismarking documents.

Hu would also overvalue negatively-performing loans, fabricate paperwork to create fake loans, mismark the fake loans as positively-performing, and then sell these fake loans to a collateralized loan obligation trust (CLO trust) and other private funds managed by IIG. Hu then used the proceeds from these fraudulent transactions to repay earlier investors, thereby running a Ponzi scheme for a decade.

In March 2018, IIG informed the SEC that it had more than $373 million in assets under management.

On November 21, 2019, the SEC charged IIG with fraud. On November 26, 2019, the SEC further revoked IIG's registration.

In 2020, Hu was arrested by authorities and charged with fraud by government regulators. In March 2020, IIG agreed to pay $35 million in disgorgement and interest to settle the fraud. Furthermore, the SEC enjoined IIG from further violating federal anti-fraud laws.

On July 17, 2020, the SEC and DOJ filed a complaint stipulating that Hu violated Section 17(a) of the Securities Act of 1933, Section 10(b) of the Securities Exchange Act of 1934, and various rules of the Investment Advisers Act of 1940.

The SEC accused Hu of organizing multiple frauds since October 2013, overvaluing assets, charging inflated fees, selling $60 million in fake loans, using the proceeds to pay earlier investors, hoodwinking clients by providing fake documentation for non-existent loans, forging credit, and fabricating promissory notes. The SEC investigation of Hu was spearheaded by Philip A. Fortino, Lindsay Moilanen, Diego Brucculeri, Eli Bass and was supervised by Sheldon L. Pollock and Osman Nawaz. The FBI also assisted the SEC in the investigation.

Hu was charged in the case U.S. v Hu, 20-cr-360. The trial took place in the U.S. District Court, Southern District of New York in Manhattan.

On January 28, 2021, Hu pleaded guilty of fraud, including wire fraud, securities fraud, investment adviser fraud, and conspiracy. In April 2021, Silver also pleaded guilty.

In April 2022, U.S. District Manhattan Judge Alvin Hellerstein sentenced Hu to 12 years in prison for the following charges:

- Mismarking defaulted loans
- Mismarking distressed loans, including loans where the borrowers missed several scheduled payments
- Fabricating fake loans to cover up losses of defaulting loans of TOF from auditors
- Abusing a CLO trust to create liquidity on fake loans
- Abusing Panama shell entities created by IIG to hide losses
- Selling more than $200 million in fake loans to GTFF and STFF to create liquidity
- Getting a mutual fund to invest in a fake $6 million loan in December 2012. The borrower failed to repay the loan in February 2017. Hu forged documents to conceal the fraud and cover up the Ponzi scheme.

Hellerstein said the 12-year sentence was to deter others in the financial industry from engaging in a similar kind of fraud. In addition to 12 years in prison, Hu was also ordered to serve three years of supervised release. Hu's ill-gotten assets of $4,798,232 plus interest $461,477 were also ordered to be disgorged. In a parallel proceeding, Hu was found guilty and ordered to forfeit these assets and pay restitution. In total, Hu was also forced to forfeit more than $129 million in funds related to his crimes.

On September 22, 2022, the U.S. District Court enjoined Hu from further violating antifraud laws.

In February 2023, Silver was sentenced to 13 months in prison. Silver was given a shorter sentence as it was mainly Hu who masterminded the Ponzi scheme. Silver was 65 years old at the time of his sentence.

== Operations ==
IIG Capital primarily focuses on facilitating the financing of trade transactions involving commodities that can be hedged and liquidated easily. IIG Capital uses a structure it developed called “transactional equity,” in which the firm helps fund the down payment required from a merchant seeking financing from a bank; this process enables the merchant to qualify for the bank financing.

The company specializes in global trade, investment funds, and loans. The company also provides advisory services and management through three private funds: the IIG Global Trade Finance Fund (GTFF), Structured Trade Finance Fund (STFF), and Trade Opportunities Fund (TOF). Another of its affiliates, IIG Bank Malta, provides private banking, wealth management, corporate banking and trade finance in Malta.

The firm provided loans for Central and South American small and medium-sized enterprises using food products, such as fish and coffee, as collateral. For example, they advised the Venezuela Recovery Fund (VRF) for a failed bank in Venezuela.
