= Hanaco Ventures =

Israeli venture capital fund

- Type: Private
- Industry: Venture capital
- Founded: 2017; 9 years ago
- Founder: Alon Lifshitz, Lior Prosor, Pasha Romanovski (2024)
- Headquarters: Herzliya, Israel
- AUM: US$2 billion
- Website: hanacovc.com

Hanaco Ventures is an Israeli venture capital fund, with offices in Herzliya, Israel. It was founded in 2017 by Alon and Tiferet Lifshitz.

In 2021, Hanaco Ventures was ranked 5th among Israeli VC funds managing over $250 million. In June 2025, it was announced that Hanaco would stop raising new capital and had no plans to launch additional funds.
