= Charlie Javice =

French and American businesswoman and convicted felon (born 1993)

- Born: 1992 or 1993 (age 33–34); Westchester County, New York, U.S.
- Citizenship: American; French
- Education: University of Pennsylvania
- Status: Released on bond with conditions
- Convictions: Securities fraud; Wire fraud; Bank fraud; Conspiracy
- Penalty: 85 months in federal prison

Charlie H. Javice (born 1992 or 1993) is a French and American businesswoman who was convicted of fraud in relation to her student financial aid application assistance company Frank. In January 2023, she and Olivier Amar, Frank's chief growth and acquisition officer, were accused of fraudulently inflating customer numbers while negotiating the sale of Javice's company to JPMorgan Chase for $175 million. Javice and Amar were charged on April 4, 2023 in Manhattan federal court with a four-count grand jury indictment for securities fraud, wire fraud, bank fraud, and conspiracy. On March 28, 2025, both were found guilty on all counts. On September 29, 2025, Javice was sentenced to 85 months' imprisonment.

== Biography ==
=== Early life and education ===
Javice grew up in Westchester County, New York. Her father, a French financier, worked at a hedge fund while her mother is a life coach and former teacher. Javice attended the French-American School of New York (Lycée franco-américain de New York), a private school that provides education from age 3 to the 12th grade.

In 2013, Javice graduated from the Wharton School of the University of Pennsylvania after three years with a bachelor's degree in finance and legal studies. As a freshman at Wharton, she founded PoverUp, an online platform to help students learn more about starting micro-finance clubs. During her sophomore year, she became a member of the Board of Overseers for the University of Pennsylvania Hillel organization, associated with Hillel International, a Jewish campus organization. She continued in this capacity until 2015.

=== Career ===
In 2016, Javice founded Frank, which assists student borrowers in obtaining loans and financial aid.

In 2017, the United States Department of Education accused Frank of potentially misleading customers to believe it was affiliated with the US government, forcing the company to change its website from frankfafsa.com to frank.com. Frank settled with the Department of Education in 2018.

In 2018, Javice was sued by Adi Omesy, a co-founder of Frank, over wage theft in Israel. In 2021, she was ordered to pay $35,000.

In September 2021, she sold the company to JPMorgan Chase for $175 million and was appointed managing director at JPMorgan, overseeing student-focused products at Chase. She was suspended in September 2022 following a lawsuit by her employer and was terminated for cause in November.

In November 2019, Javice was listed on Forbes 30 Under 30, a pick the publication regretted four years later; Javice was included in its 'Hall of Shame', featuring ten picks Forbes wished it could take back.

=== Lawsuit and criminal charges ===
In 2022, JPMorgan filed a lawsuit for fraud, claiming that the data reported by Frank was largely a fabrication and alleged that Javice paid a data science professor $18,000 for a list of more than four million fake student names to convince JPMorgan to purchase Frank. Javice countersued JPMorgan, claiming that she was being scapegoated for their own faulty due diligence. On April 4, 2023, federal prosecutors in Manhattan charged Javice with wire fraud affecting a financial institution, securities fraud, bank fraud and conspiracy. The same day, she was also charged with fraud by the U.S. Securities and Exchange Commission. She was released on a two million dollar bond, on condition that she surrender her passports and restrict her travel to New York City and southern Florida, and agreeing not to contact witnesses who are involved in the case. A four-count grand jury indictment made public on May 18, 2023, in Manhattan federal court charged Javice with securities fraud, wire fraud, bank fraud, and conspiracy.

JPMorgan Chase was forced to pay Javice's legal fees—both criminal and civil—after she successfully sued in Delaware Chancery Court. The judge ruled that the terms of the Frank deal, which had made Javice an employee of the bank, required it to cover the costs of her multiple defense teams, which would eventually exceed $100 million.

Javice pled not guilty, and her trial began in February 2025. She was convicted of defrauding JPMorgan Chase on March 28, 2025, with the jury finding her guilty on all four charges—securities fraud, wire fraud, bank fraud, and conspiracy—each of which was punishable by up to 30 years in Federal prison.

After her conviction, Javice pursued a career as a Pilates instructor in South Florida, teaching classes several hours a day. Her lawyers cited her profession as a reason she should not be required to wear an ankle monitor before sentencing, arguing it would hinder her ability to teach. However, Judge Alvin Hellerstein dismissed the argument, concluding that the device was necessary due to concerns about flight risk.

On September 30, 2025, Javice was sentenced to 85 months (seven years) in federal prison. Hellerstein also ordered her to forfeit over $22 million in illegally obtained pay, stock, and bonuses earned from the company sale and a year as managing director at JPMorgan before her fraud was exposed. In addition, Javice and co-defendant Olivier Amar were ordered to jointly pay $287.5 million in restitution, covering the Frank sale price and the more than $100 million they'd incurred in legal fees, which JPMorgan had been required to pay.

On March 24, 2026 a federal judge rejected Javice's appeal to overturn her conviction after she alleged that two law clerks' employment with JPMorgan's outside law firm constituted conflicts of interest. In June, Javice reportedly sought a pardon from President Donald Trump as part of a wave of pardons related to America 250.

== Awards and recognition ==
- 2011: Ranked 99th on list of Most Creative People by Fast Company
- 2019: Named in Forbes 30 Under 30 – Finance
- 2019: Named in Crain's New York Business 40 Under 40
- 2023: Named in Forbes 30 Under 30 Hall of Shame

== Personal life ==
Javice is a Jewish and lives in Miami. She is a dual citizen of the US and France.

== See also ==
- Elizabeth Holmes – American businesswoman (born 1984)
- Theranos – American health-technology company, 2003–2018
