= David Medved =

American physicist

David Bernard Medved (February 1926 – March 11, 2009) was a physicist, entrepreneur, and astronaut candidate.

== Biography ==
David Bernard Medved was born to Jewish Ukrainian immigrants. His interest in science was initiated upon receiving a chemistry set as a Bar Mitzvah present. He later worked by helping his older brother, an electrician, and by working as a chemist at Publicker Industries distillery where his father had worked as a barrel maker.

He attended high school at Central High School of Philadelphia. Upon graduation, he applied for the Mayor’s Scholarship and placed first out of all the scholarship contestants in the city. He joined the U.S. Navy just before the end of World War II. He attended high school and the University of Pennsylvania from 1947 to 1955 along with political activist Noam Chomsky.

After obtaining a PhD from the University of Pennsylvania, he worked for Convair/General Dynamics in San Diego, where he developed systems to destroy intercontinental missiles during flight. During his work with NASA's Gemini space program as chief designer of an ion wake experiment, astronaut Neil Armstrong encouraged him to try out for the new Scientist Astronaut program which was to include a planned two-year mission to Mars. He made the cut of the final twenty candidates, but he was rejected following an extensive dental examination, receiving the word personally from Alan Shepard.

After teaching physics at UCLA and working as a research director for Xerox, he built two electro-optics companies including MERET (MEdved REsearch and Technology) with hundreds of employees which was sold to Amoco in 1990. In 1990, he moved to Israel, where he founded Jerusalem Optical Link Technologies which was sold to MRV Communications in 2000.

After the age of 50, he perfected his Hebrew and memorized the Five Books of Moses. In 2008, he published the book Hidden Light: Science Secrets of the Bible. He was buried at the Har Menuchot cemetery in Jerusalem.

== Family ==
David Medved married Renate (née Hirsch) and had four sons, including his eldest son, radio talk show host and movie critic Michael Medved, as well as founder and CEO of OurCrowd, Jonathan Medved. Jonathan "Jon" Medved, born in San Diego in 1954 or 1955, studied history at the University of California at Berkeley. As a college student he was an activist for Israeli affairs, and by 1980 had emigrated to Israel. It was there that a venture startup with his father led to a career in venture capitalism. By 2006 he had led 12 Israeli startups to valuation above $100 million. Since 2013, he has served as the CEO of OurCrowd, and businessweek.com lists him with 21 other corporate affiliations.
