= Occupation of Iraq =

Occupation of Iraq or Iraq occupation may refer to:

- Occupation of Iraq (2003–2011) (occupation by American, British and Italian forces)
- Mandatory Iraq (Iraq under British Administration, 1921–1932)
- Northern Iraq offensive (June 2014)
- US-led intervention in Iraq (2014–2021)
