= Saul Singer =

American writer

- שאול זינגר
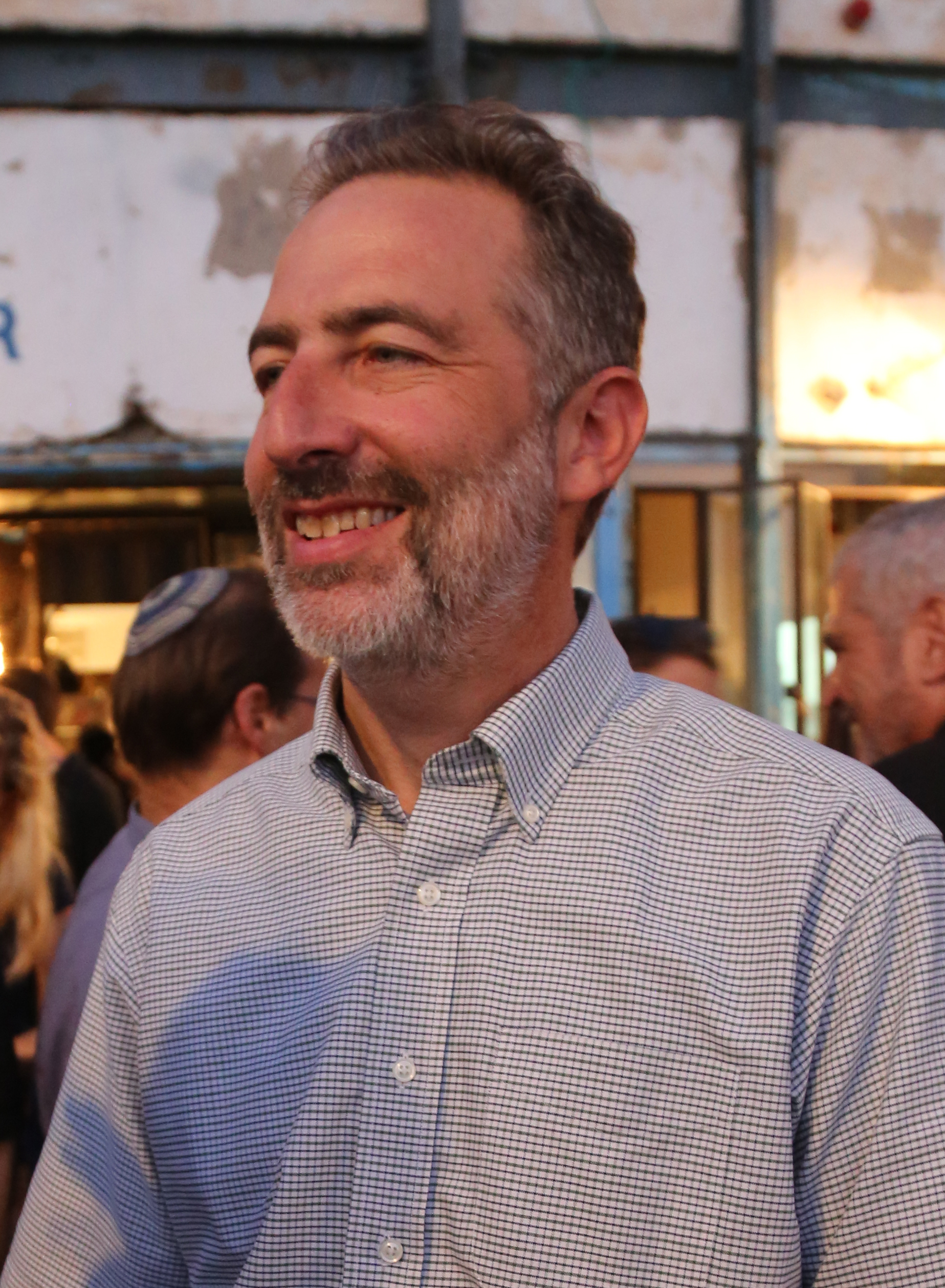
- Saul Singer in 2014.
- Occupations: Journalist and author
- Known for: Co-author of Start-up Nation: The Story of Israel's Economic Miracle, former editorial page editor at The Jerusalem Post

Saul Singer (Hebrew: שאול זינגר) is an Israeli journalist who was the former editorial page editor at The Jerusalem Post. He is known for being the co-writer, with Dan Senor, of Start-up Nation: The Story of Israel's Economic Miracle, a best-seller which investigates Israel's innovative prowess.

== Biography ==
Saul Singer served as an adviser in the United States Congress to the House Foreign Affairs and Senate Banking Committees. In 1994, he immigrated to Israel. He is married to Wendy Singer. They reside in Jerusalem with their three daughters; Noa, Tamar and Yarden.

In 1987, Singer's brother Alexander, an IDF Lieutenant, was killed at the age of 25 during an Israeli military operation in Lebanon. He died trying to rescue his downed company commander. Alex Singer's journal became a book. Saul dedicated Start-up Nation to the memory of his fallen brother.

== Journalism and literary career ==
Singer is a columnist and former editorial page editor at The Jerusalem Post. He has also been published in The Wall Street Journal, Commentary, Moment, The New Leader and The Washington Post blog "PostGlobal".

Along with Dan Senor, Singer co-authored Start-up Nation, published in 2009. The book was highly acclaimed, ranking fifth on the business best-seller list of The New York Times in 2010.

In 2003, Singer authored another book: Confronting Jihad: Israel's Struggle and the World After 9/11. The book collects many of his columns and unsigned editorials written for The Jerusalem Post between 1997 and the summer of 2003. Reviewing Confronting Jihad in National Review, contributing editor Mackubin Thomas Owens writes, "9/11 and terrorist attacks against Israel form a seamless garment, both being motivated by the same hatred. No one has done a better job of demonstrating this point than Saul Singer... Americans who wish to understand the reality of Israel's war against terrorism and its connection to our own struggle should read this fine collection of essays."

== Published works ==
- Confronting Jihad: Israel's Struggle & The World After 9/11 (2003)
- Start-up Nation: The Story of Israel's Economic Miracle (2009)
- The Genius of Israel: The Surprising Resilience of a Divided Nation in a Turbulent World (2023)
