= Michael Eisenberg =

American-born Israeli businessman (born 1971)

- מייקל אייזנברג
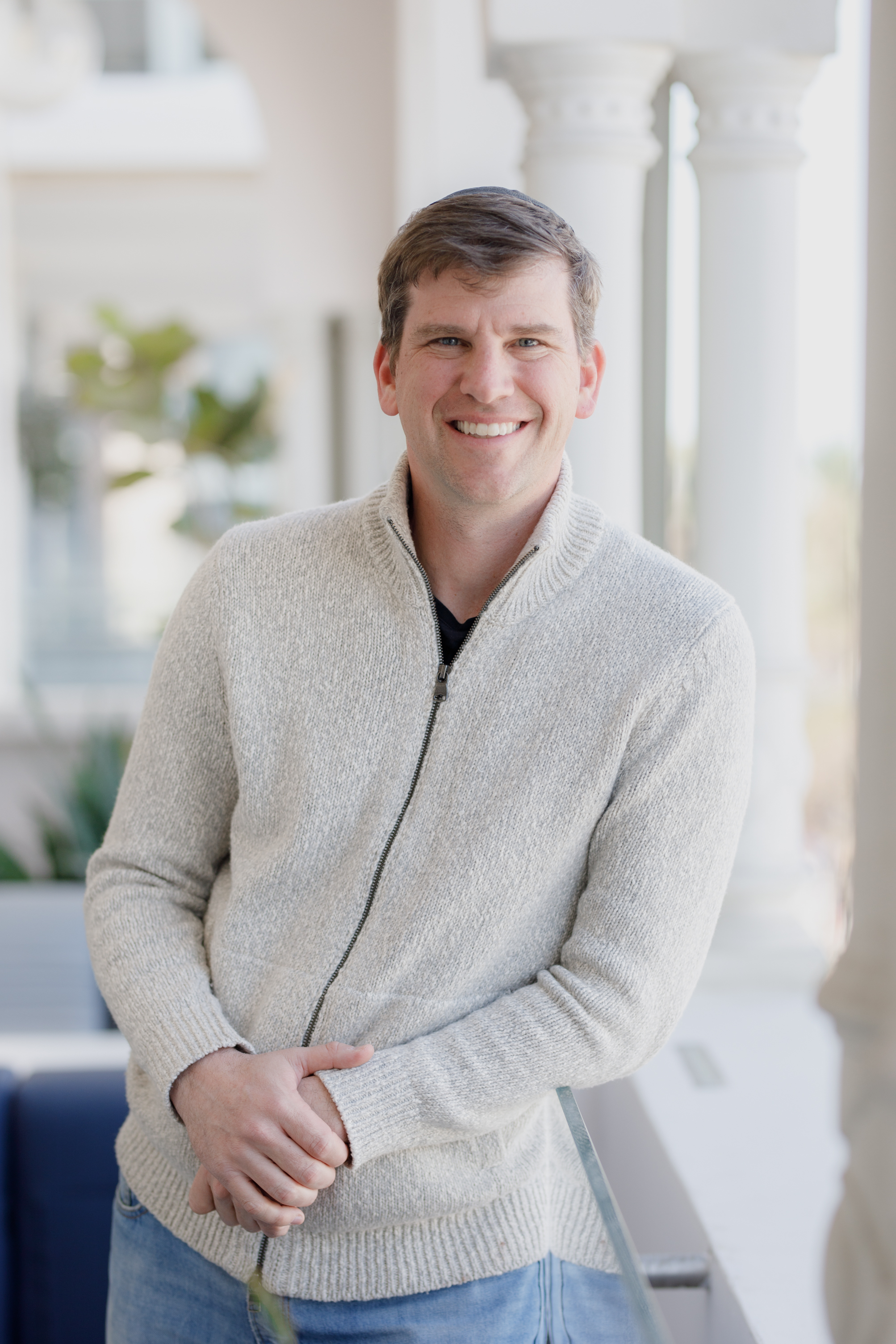
- Eisenberg in April 2019
- Born: May 18, 1971 (age 55); New York City, U.S.
- Education: Yeshiva University
- Occupation: Businessman
- Spouse: Yaffa
- Children: 8

Michael Eisenberg (Hebrew: מייקל אייזנברג; born May 18, 1971) is an American-born Israeli businessman.

== Personal life ==
Eisenberg was born in Manhattan, New York City. After graducating Yeshiva University High School for Boys, he attended Yeshiva University for one year, then did two gap years at Yeshivat Har Etzion. He then completed his B.A. back at Yeshiva.

In 1993, Eisenberg and his wife Yaffa immigrated to Israel. He is a resident of Jerusalem and has eight children.

== Career ==
Eisenberg co-founded two venture capitals, Israel Seed Partners and Aleph, both are based in Israel. He joined Montgomery Securities and Jerusalem Global Investment Bank in 1995, and then Benchmark Capital in 2005. Eisenberg's first investment was in PictureVision, a photo-sharing company. While working for Benchmark, he invested in Gigya, Conduit, and Seeking Alpha. Charlie Javice, the founder of Frank who has received funding from Aleph, was arrested in 2023 for fraud against JPMorgan Chase. Eisenberg was reported to have no comment when reached by Forbes.

In October 2025 and during the cease fire agreement, Eisenberg was appointed to be one of the Israeli representatives enforcing the cease fire.

In December 2025, Der Spiegel reported that Eisenberg is an investor in the cybersecurity company Dream, co-founded by former Austrian chancellor Sebastian Kurz, and described him as a confidant of Israeli Prime Minister Benjamin Netanyahu. The report also noted that Eisenberg heads the organization Hashomer HaChadash, which the magazine said supports Israeli settlers in the West Bank.

Eisenberg is a board member of Yeshivat Har Etzion and chairman of Hashomer HaChadash. He directed Snunit, a non-profit organization that promotes technology studies in Israeli elementary schools. He also launched a fellowship program for new immigrants working in high-tech in 2020, and participated in Machshava Tova's effort to teach high school students from disadvantaged homes to code and build websites. Eisenberg is reported to be an informal advisor of Benjamin Netanyahu, discussing topics related to economy and Israel's policy in Gaza.

Eisenberg edited The Commentator, a student newspaper of Yeshiva University. He hosted an Internet blog since 2005. He has published a few articles on the Tablet Magazine, and Washington Examiner, and Globes. He hosts his own podcast since 2023.

In 2024, Eisenberg became the subject of a high-profile defamation lawsuit filed by former Israeli Prime Minister Ehud Barak and former Unit 8200 commander Ehud Schneorson. The two, co-founders of the offensive cyber firm Paragon, alleged that Eisenberg defamed them in a post on X in which he quoted anonymous claims accusing Paragon of harming Israeli national security and selling technology abroad without proper authorization. Eisenberg argued that his comments were in the public interest and based on concerns raised by intelligence community figures. As of mid-2025, the case is ongoing.

Eisenberg later appeared in a televised investigative report by the Israeli program Zman Emet ("Real Time"), which revealed a classified letter written by senior members of Israel’s intelligence community warning of significant national security risks associated with the sale of Paragon to a U.S. investment firm. The report included concerns over technology leakage and strategic vulnerabilities, lending credibility to some of the issues Eisenberg had publicly raised.

== See also ==
- Economy of Israel
- Start-up Nation
