= Start-up Nation =

Book on Israeli economy by Dan Senor and Saul Singer

Start-up Nation: The Story of Israel's Economic Miracle
- Author: Dan Senor and Saul Singer
- Language: English
- Publisher: Twelve
- Publication date: November 4, 2009
- Publication place: United States
- Media type: Print (hardcover)
- Pages: 320
- ISBN: 978-0-446-54146-6

Start-up Nation: The Story of Israel's Economic Miracle is a 2009 book by Dan Senor and Saul Singer about the economy of Israel. It examines how Israel was able to reach such economic growth that "at the start of 2009, some 63 Israeli companies were listed on the NASDAQ, more than those of any other foreign country."

In 2010, Start-up Nation was ranked fifth on the business bestseller list of The New York Times. It also reached The Wall Street Journal bestseller list.

Despite claims in the media that Dan Senor coined the phrase "start-up nation" in 2009, the phrase was featured in American technology media at least since November 2000 in an article by Stacy Perman titled "Startup Nation" describing Israel.

== Book overview ==
The Council on Foreign Relations stated in its publisher's blurb for the book that Start-up Nation addresses the question: "How is it that Israel—a country of 7.1 million people, only sixty years old, surrounded by enemies, in a constant state of war since its founding, with no natural resources—produces more start-up companies on a per capita basis than large, peaceful, and stable nations and regions like Japan, China, India, Korea, Canada, and all of Europe?" The Economist noted that Israel had more high-tech start-ups and a larger venture capital industry per capita than any other country in the world. The Economist described Start-up Nation as the most notable of a "growing pile" of books on the success of Israel's technology sector.

In their attempt to explain Israel's success in this area, Senor and Singer discard "the argument from ethnic or religious exceptionalism, dismissing 'unitary Jewishness' or even individual talent as major reasons for Israel's high-tech success" and analyze two major factors that, in the authors' opinion, contribute most to Israel's economic growth. Those factors are mandatory military service and immigration.

The authors argue that a major factor for Israel's economic growth can be found in the culture of the Israel Defense Forces (IDF), in which service is mandatory for most young Israelis. The authors suggest that service in the IDF equips future entrepreneurs with a broad range of skills and valuable connections. They assert that the IDF provides experience in taking on responsibility within a relatively flat organizational structure. IDF soldiers "have minimal guidance from the top, and are expected to improvise, even if this means breaking some rules. If you're a junior officer, you call your higher-ups by their first names, and if you see them doing something wrong, you say so." Neither ranks nor ages matter much "when taxi drivers can command millionaires and 23-year-olds can train their uncles," and "Israeli forces regularly vote to oust their unit leaders."

The book also dwells at length on immigration and its role in Israel's economic growth: "Immigrants are not averse to starting from scratch. They are by definition risk-takers. A nation of immigrants is a nation of entrepreneurs. From survivors of the Holocaust to Soviet refuseniks through the Ethiopian Jews, the State of Israel never ceased to be a land of immigration: 9 out of 10 Jewish Israelis today are immigrants or descendants of immigrants, the first or second generation. This specific demographic, causing fragmentation of the community that still continues in the country, is nevertheless a great incentive to try their luck, to take risks because immigrants have nothing to lose."

Additional factors cited by the authors include a sense of dissatisfaction with the status quo, a culture that encourages experimentation with technology, and government policies that support start-ups.

Using stories and anecdotes, the book provides examples of Israel's technological and medical achievements, among them "the Israeli innovations that made possible Google Suggest, the list of suggestions that appear instantly in menu form as you type a search request, the capsule endoscopy, a miniature camera embedded in a pill so that 18 photos per second can be wirelessly and painlessly transmitted from gastrointestinal tracts."

The book highlights Israel’s numerous achievements in technological innovation, but also examines why Israel has yet to produce its own major corporations. The authors attribute this partly to the tendency of Israeli startups to be acquired by large foreign companies and partly to mismanagement.

To write the book, Senor and Singer interviewed over 100 individuals, including Israeli venture investors, historians, U.S. military officials, and Israeli heads of state. they conclude that "while Israel has much to learn from the world, the world has much to learn from Israel."

== Authors ==
Dan Senor is a former foreign policy official in the United States government. He served as chief spokesman for the Coalition Provisional Authority in Iraq and now advises venture capital firms. Saul Singer is a columnist and former editorial page editor for The Jerusalem Post.

== Critical reception ==
Jon Rosen of USA Today believed that the book is written from an Israeli perspective and could frustrate those opposed to the nation's foreign policy. However, he still considered it an accomplishment, "not simply for exposing the roots of Israel's success, but by showing what the Israeli case might teach the rest of the world." In The Wall Street Journal, James K. Glassman said that "the greatest strength of Start-up Nation is not analysis but anecdote. The authors tell vivid stories of entrepreneurial success, such as that of Shai Agassi, the son of an Iraqi immigrant to Israel, with his electric-automobile technology, now in the process of creating 'Car 2.0.'"

Publishers Weekly stated that "the authors ground their analysis in case studies and interviews with some of Israel's most brilliant innovators to make this a rich and insightful read not just for business leaders and policy makers but for anyone curious about contemporary Israeli culture."

In The Economic Times, R Gopalakrishnan wrote that the use of Hebrew expressions made the book "alive and eminently-readable." Gopalakrishnan concluded that the ideas demonstrated in the book "are highly relevant for innovation capability in general, but for India, especially at this juncture."

David Horovitz of The Jerusalem Post said that conclusions of Start-up Nation are validated by real-world events, such as the treatment given to Gabby Giffords after the 2011 Tucson shooting, where an emergency medical team used a elasticized bandage developed in Israel to control her head wounds.

A review in The Washington Post says that "the book weaves together colorful stories of Israeli technological triumphs" such as the story of Shvat Shaked, who "founded a cybersecurity firm with his old buddy from Army intelligence and had the chutzpah to bet a top executive at PayPal, the online commerce company owned by eBay, that his few dozen engineers could beat PayPal's thousands in developing secure online software." The review also states that the authors could have done a better job drawing "straight lines between their theories about Israel's success and these case studies".

Maureen Farrell of Forbes was disappointed that the authors mostly ignored the effects of United States foreign aid to Israel. This percentage was as high as ~13% during some years of the first decades after 1950, according to The Times of Israel. She says the book "is worth reading to understand not just Israel's history but the history of capitalism and innovation."

== Impact ==
Journalists and policymakers in several countries have recommended Start-up Nation as a useful guide for promoting entrepreneurship. A review of the book in The Irish Times calls on Ireland to follow Israel's model. Andrius Kubilius, the prime minister of Lithuania, has cited Start-up Nation as his favorite book. Yrjö Ojasaar, managing partner of Solon Partners, an executive consulting and angel investor company in Estonia, says "there is much to be learned from the Israeli experience of venture capital incubation through building incentives for privatization." CNN's Fareed Zakaria called Start-up Nation "a book every single Arab businessman, Arab bureaucrat, and Arab politician should read." The book is cited as a handbook of "classic economics." It teaches small businesses "how effective a cohesive team can be, especially when that team emphasizes chutzpah first."

Former Palestinian prime minister Salam Fayyad reportedly kept a copy of Start-up Nation on his desk as a source of inspiration for the West Bank's own burgeoning technology industry.

== See also ==
- Economic dynamism
- Economy of Israel
- Israel Innovation Authority
- Israeli inventions and discoveries
- Science and technology in Israel
- Silicon Wadi, the areas with a high concentration of high-technology companies in Israel
- List of Israeli companies quoted on the Nasdaq
- List of multinationals with research and development centres in Israel
- Venture capital in Israel
- Yozma Fund - venture capital funds started in Israel with government support
