= H2 Ventures =

Fintech, data and artificial intelligence

- Industry: Financial services
- Founded: 2014
- Founders: Toby Heap; Ben Heap
- Headquarters: Sydney, Australia
- Area served: Australia
- Website: www.h2.vc

H2 Ventures is a fintech, data and artificial intelligence focused venture capital investment firm based in Sydney, Australia. It runs the H2 Startup Accelerator. H2 Ventures is located in the NSW Government backed Sydney Startup Hub.

== History ==
The H2 Ventures Accelerator was founded as the AWI Ventures Accelerator which was launched by the then Australian Federal Government Communications Minister Malcolm Turnbull on 13 March 2014. It ran its first intake from June to November 2014 and a second intake from January to June 2015. In 2015, brothers Ben Heap and Dr Toby Heap left AWI to establish H2 Ventures and ran the third intake of the accelerator from February to July 2016.

In December 2015, First State Super and H2 Ventures announced they had entered into an investment partnership to invest in fintech start-up companies. The launch of the First State Super-H2 partnership was officiated by the Prime Minister Malcolm Turnbull and was attended by the Australian Treasurer Scott Morrison, Assistant Treasurer Kelly O'Dwyer, Assistant Innovation Minister Wyatt Roy and NSW Minister for Industry, Anthony Roberts.

In March 2016, Investec Australia announced an investment in H2 Ventures, enabling the expansion of the H2 Accelerator. The amount of the Investec investment was not disclosed, however, the head of principal investing at Investec Australia, David Phillips, joined the board of H2.

In January 2017, the NSW Government and Investec provided a $4 million funding facility for the H2 Accelerator. With this funding, H2 Ventures announced that it would expand its fintech accelerator to include startups with a focus on data and artificial intelligence. The H2 Accelerator ran its fourth and fifth intakes in February and August 2017.

== Fintech100 ==
H2 Ventures publishes an annual report of leading global fintech innovators titled ‘Fintech100’. The Fintech100 includes a list of the top 50 established fintech companies from around the world, and 50 emerging fintechs. Three Chinese firms, Ant Financial, ZhongAn and Qudian took the top three rankings in the 2017 Fintech100.
