= Impractical Jokers season 11 =

Impractical Jokers
- Season 11
- No. of episodes: 19

Release
- Original network: TBS
- Original release: July 25, 2024 – March 20, 2025

Season chronology
- ← Previous; Season 10 Next → Season 12

The eleventh season of Impractical Jokers premiered on July 25, 2024. It is the first season to air exclusively on TBS, having moved from sister network TruTV.

== Episodes ==
No. overall	No. in season	Title	Original air date	Losing Joker(s)	U.S. viewers (millions)
253	1	"Tournament of Losers"	July 25, 2024	Murr	TBA
The Jokers kick certain customers out of Raising Cane's for a specific reason as manager without other customers preventing them. Then they along with Adam Ray do a tag team version of Off the Hook where they distract a customer to help take a picture while the other joker tries to hook their shopping bag. Punishment: At a sports bar, Murr disrupts a live March Madness viewing of the first round between Oakland University and University of Kentucky by using a remote control to switch the channel the game was airing on to watch Jack Osbourne's Night of Terror special on Bigfoot.
254	2	"Cell Block"	August 1, 2024	Murr	TBA
The Jokers must pass a job interview with resumes written by and dictated by the others. Then they try to convince shoppers to not buy Nonna's sauce. Punishment: Murr has to go to a mall and get people to get off their phones, whether by hanging up the call or just interrupting them.
255	3	"Bowling for Dollars"	August 8, 2024	Sal	TBA
Today the Jokers are snagging tips at a restaurant and spinning the Wheel of Doom during interviews with Joe DeRosa filling in for Sal to determine who will be the losing Joker. Terry Matalas makes an appearance during Q's turn in the latter challenge. Punishment: At a bowling alley, Sal is forced to act awkward by waving a wad of money around a bowling alley doing various things the other jokers tells him to do.
256	4	"The Planetarium Prowler"	August 15, 2024	Q	TBA
The jokers report crimes in a bakery and disrupt mealtime for their ridiculous social media promotions at the Dallas BBQ. Punishment: Q is given a flashlight at the Jennifer Chalsty Planetarium and has to find his weed dealer, who is a person with marked eyes.
257	5	"Check Yourself"	August 22, 2024	Murr	TBA
The Jokers splash water at employees in a pizza restaurant and read unusual product reviews. Brooke Shields makes an appearance during Q's turn in the former challenge. Punishment: Murr plays as a server at Delmonico's and must stall as much as possible before giving the customers the check.
258	6	"The F Bomber"	August 29, 2024	Sal	TBA
The Jokers get strangers to be their fake spouse for a survey to win money, and interview folks for an upcoming lifestyle article. Punishment: Sal must apologize for "accidentally" cursing in front of parents' children at a play center.
259	7	"Personal Be-Wrongings"	September 12, 2024	Q	TBA
The guys get temp workers to cover for them while they hide under a desk, telling them what to say to their angry boss. Then, they get stranger's opinions on the bizzare emails they have wrote. Punishment: While individuals participate in a photoshoot, Q is forced to stand at the back of the room and try to sneak belongings from women's purses.
260	8	"Shake What Daddy Gave Ya"	September 19, 2024	Sal	TBA
The Jokers urge diners to pay a ridiculous fee added to their bills, and critique shoppers' behaviors at a supermarket. Punishment: Sal is forced to present a pole dancing workout routine to a group of older individuals, which includes his own father.
261	9	"One for the Books"	September 26, 2024	Sal	TBA
The Jokers must do and say whatever they're told at Raising Cane's and get strangers to help them move furniture in the park. Punishment: Sal thinks Murr is getting punished. Murr gets strapped on a drifting racecar at Old Bridge Township Raceway Park while he must record an audiobook for his novel. Murr falls off the car, scaring Sal. Paramedics rush over. While Sal is standing by, one of the paramedics turns around and reveals himself to be Murr. The Murr who fell off the car was a stuntman. Murr gives Sal a copy of his book.
262	10	"Bad News Bares"	January 9, 2025	Sal	TBA
The guys play the Over The Shoulder game at the supermarket, stealing and tossing items with singer/songwriter Jax. Later, they get strangers to record their bogus marriage proposal while a stranger records and must get them to throw confetti. Punishment: Sal goes into an office of colleagues to lead a team building presentation. It starts out normal but during the course of the presentation, the office workers strip naked and do physical team building exercises with Sal. Later, they hide for a surprise birthday for a fake office worker named "Jim", but Murr comes out of a prop cake while naked and they take a selfie and FaceTime Sal's mother.
263	11	"When You Gotta Go"	January 16, 2025	Murr	TBA
The guys do and say whatever they're told at a supermarket with their fake babies, and try to get strangers to support their bogus programs at a pizza parlor. Punishment: Murr is forced to go into a parking lot and get caught peeing on stranger's cars, with a tube device going through his pants.
264	12	"Cross the Line"	January 23, 2025	Sal	TBA
The guys get stranger's opinions on their crazy replies to bad reviews on their vacation rentals, and put their acting skills to the test at a bagel shop with actors Richard Kind and Adam Ray. Punishment: Sal must cut people at the checkout line at a grocery store, with the ridiculous reasons given to him by the other guys.
265	13	"Bullion Beggar"	January 30, 2025	Q	0.29
The guys play concerned dads and get strangers in a mall to eavesdrop a conversation between their fake daughters and scumbag boyfriends. Then, they pose as food scientists and get participants to sample beverages despite their crazy side effects. Punishment: Q's head is covered in gold paint and wears a gold-colored outfit from head to toe and must pose as a street performer working for tips. For every 10 minutes where he does not make $5, one of his prized possessions is dipped into hot gold paint and ruined. At the end, he gets into the Crown Vic car from Impractical Jokers: The Movie and drives off, while getting shot with gold confetti and forced to listen to the Drive, Drive, Drive music again from his season 9 punishment.
264	14	"Hung In There"	February 6, 2025	Murr	0.22
The Jokers work the front desk at a hotel and offer customers services made up by the guys for a small upcharge. Then, they get strangers to film a video for them at the American Dream mall food court while the other guys tell them what to say and do. Punishment: Murr is brought to a farm and he is forced to hand wash manure off a tractor, shovel horse manure with his custom made tool kit from Murr Farms, and push a large hay bale. Then, for his real punishment, he must sheath clean a big horse's penis with his bare hands.
265	15	"Thanks for Nothing"	February 13, 2025	Sal	0.28
The guys play casting directors at the mall looking for children to play bizzare roles for a fake TV show. Then, the guys read movie reviews in a focus group while trying not to laugh at the ridiculous reviews read by Casey Jost's father, Dan Jost. Punishment: Sal goes on a date at a restaurant and he must get a stranger to come to his table and thank him, to make him look good and impress his date. He is then forced to give his thanks to the stranger by saying awful lines given to him by the other guys.
266	16	"Lactose Intolerables"	February 27, 2025	Murr and Q	TBA
The guys pose as food court janitors at the American Dream mall with a remote controlled garbage can. Then, they pose as office workers working with a temp worker, and the guys must get the worker's help planning revenge on Dan Cast after he bullies them. Punishment: Sal hosts a spinoff gameshow called Heads! based on Q's game Tails, except Murr and Q are contestants and are placed in plastic chambers with just their heads peeking out. Store shoppers and crew members press a button to make the milk fill up, and the guys must drink the milk as it fills up to avoid getting completely submerged in milk. At the end, Murr loses since his button was pressed more times, and he gets punched in the stomach.
267	17	"Recut Gems"	March 6, 2025	clip show	TBA
Q and Hard Jimmy (Murr) show extended footage of their favorite recent challenges.
268	18	"Off The Wheels"	March 13, 2025	Murr	TBA
The guys try not to laugh while participating in a fake documentary interview with a stranger, and try to upcharge hotel customers with ridiculous services. Punishment: Murr poses as a cycling coach at a Peloton biking class and must motivate bikers by doing and saying whatever the other guys and Ally Love tell him to. Murr's stepdad makes an appearance near the end and spanks him.
269	19	"Trolling For Friends"	March 29, 2025	Murr	TBA
The guys pose as actors in a fake home security commercial, and they must do and say whatever the other guys tell them to. Punishment: Murr is dressed up with hair and makeup as a troll. While lurking in the darkness at the Touch Tunnel at the Liberty Science Center, he must make a new friend by scaring visitors and doing and saying (with a deep voice by inhaling sulfur hexafluoride, which was also used in a season 8 punishment for Murr) whatever the other guys tell him to.

Punishment Count:

- Murr - 8 (including joint punishments) Total now: 86
- Sal - 7 (including joint punishments) Total now: 91
- Q - 4 (including joint punishments) Total now: 65
