= Shochat =

Shochat or Shohat is a Hebrew occupational surname derived from the Hebrew word shochet for "kosher slaughterer". Variant: Schochet. Notable people with the surname include:

- Avraham Shochat (born 1936), Israeli politician
- Eden Shochat, Israeli businessman
- Ella Shohat, American academic and author
- Gideon Shochat (1912–1966), Israeli diplomat
- Gil Shohat
- Hannah Meisel-Shochat
- Nadiashda Galli-Shohat, Russian physicist
- Ilan Shohat (born 1974), Israeli politician
- Israel Shochat (1886–1962), Russian-born Zionist militia leader
- James Alexander Shohat, American mathematician
- Manya Shochat (1880–1961), Russian-born Israeli pioneer
- Ori Shochat, Israeli record producer
- Tal Shochat (born 1974), Israeli photographer
