= Genesis Partners =

Israeli venture capital firm

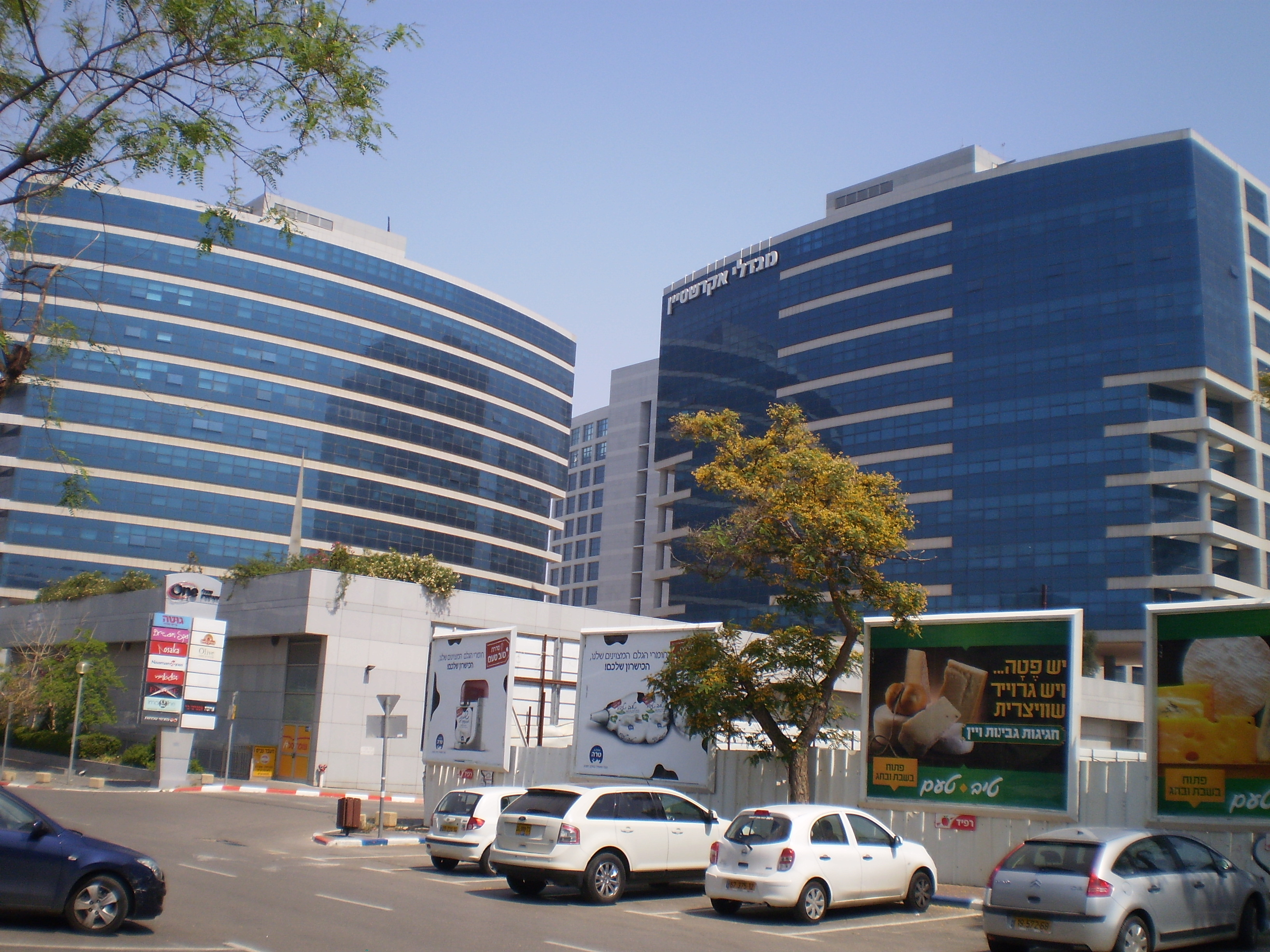
- Headquarters at Akershtein Towers, Herzliya
- Industry: Venture capital
- Founded: 1996; 30 years ago
- Headquarters: Herzliya, Israel
- Website: www.genesispartners.com

Genesis Partners is an Israeli venture capital firm founded in 1996.

== Overview ==
Genesis Partners focuses on Israeli technology startups, including ones in digital and wireless communications, computer software and hardware, and content creation. Genesis has over $20 billion in assets under management and has invested in over 300 companies, including Any.do, Allot Communications, AudioCodes, ClickSoftware Technologies, Compugen, eToro, Homeis, Innovid, JoyTunes, Kidaro, Monday.com, PrimeSense,Radwin, Riskified, Sisense, SolarEdge Valens Semiconductor.

The firm's partners include Eddy Shalev, Eyal Kishon, Gary Gannot, Jonathan Saacks and Hadar Kiriati.

== History ==
Genesis Partners was founded in 1996 by Eddy Shalev and Eyal Kishon.

In 2011, Genesis Partners launched The Junction, Israel's first open house for entrepreneurs.

In 2016, three members of the senior investment team, including Jonathan Saacks and Eddy Shalev, spun out with a seed stage fund, F2 Venture Capital, and took over management of The Junction.

In 2019, Insight Venture Partners announced purchasing a majority of the portfolio of Genesis Partners fourth fund named Genesis Partners IV. Eyal Kishon, Eddy Shalev, Jonathan Saacks, and Gary Gannot would remain on their investment boards, per the agreement.

== See also ==
- Venture capital in Israel
- Silicon Wadi
- List of Israeli companies quoted on the Nasdaq
- List of multinationals with research and development centres in Israel
- Yozma Fund
