= Eden Shochat =

Israeli businessman (born 1977)

- אדן שוחט
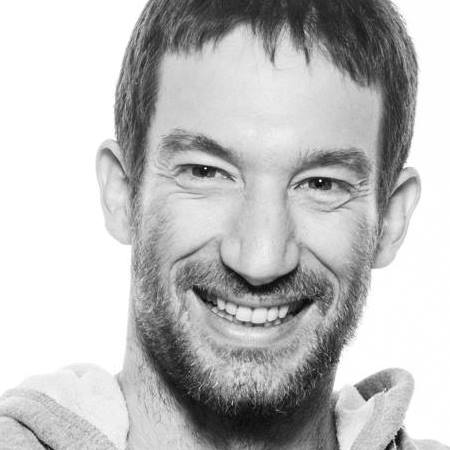
- Born: 1 October 1977 (age 48); Kibbutz Ruhama, Israel
- Occupation: Venture capitalist
- Known for: Face.com, Genesis Partners
- Children: 3

Eden Shochat (Hebrew: אדן שוחט; born 1 October 1977) is an Israeli businessman and venture capitalist. He is the co-founder of Aleph, an early-stage venture capital fund, with Michael Eisenberg.

== Biography ==
Eden Shochat was born on Kibbutz Ruhama in the Negev in southern Israel.

At the age of three, Shochat moved with his family to Nigeria and later to Liberia, for his father's work. He wrote his first line of code at the age of ten. When the family returned to Israel, he attended high school in Raanana but left before graduating.

== Business career ==
At the age of 16, Shochat co-founded Shells Interactive, which developed systems in a 3D environment for distributing interactive content on the Internet. He invested in the company for six years, but it ended in failure. In 2004, Shochat was the founding partner of Aternity, a developer of user experience systems, later acquired by Riverbed Technology, and the algorithmic trading company Delavenne Enterprises. Aternity was sold in 2016 at an estimated value of $70 million.

In 2007, Shochat co-founded Face.com, which created technology for facial recognition. In July 2012, the company was sold to Facebook for $100 million.

In 2010, Shochat joined Genesis Partners, becoming the youngest full partner in a venture capital firm in Israel. He left after three years of leading its investments in Riskified, Monday.com and JoyTunes, but continued to serve on the board of directors of companies he nurtured. While at Genesis, he founded a start-up accelerator, The Junction, a pay-it-forward platform for entrepreneurs, contributing to the establishment of start-ups like Houseparty (acquired by Epic Games), AppsFlyer, ClarityRay (acquired by Yahoo) and KitLocate (acquired by Yandex).

After leaving Genesis, Shochat co-founded a venture capital firm, Aleph, in partnership with Michael Eisenberg, with the goal of bringing an entrepreneurs-first approach to the Israeli venture capital scene. Within two months, Shochat and Eisenberg raised a $154 million fund. Aleph is an early-stage fund with $850 million under management which partners with Israeli entrepreneurs to build large companies and global brands. Among its first investments were Fabric, Nexar, Colu, Lemonade, Inc. and WeWork. In 2021, Aleph announced the closing of a new $300 million fund named Aleph IV, after raising a $180 million second fund in 2016 and a $200 million third fund in December 2019.

== Public activism ==
In 2004, Shochat was among the founders of Geekcon, a nonprofit that promotes creativity and innovation by inviting inventors from around the world to attend 3-day technology marathons where participants develop seemingly useless products. Geekcon events have been organized every year on topics ranging from medicine to the environment and animals, often culminating in the establishment of startups with commercial potential.

In November 2014, Shochat published the "List of Angels," a crowdsourced list with contact information for hundreds of angel investors, enabling entrepreneurs to connect with investors who have relevant interests.

Shochat serves on the board of trustees of Bankinter Foundation for Innovation. He is also on the board of Ramot, Tel Aviv University’s Technology Transfer company, and lectures at Reichman University’s Zell Entrepreneurship Program.

== Views and opinions ==
In an interview in 2016 with the editor-in-chief of Globes, Shochat said that Israeli high-tech was entering its second golden age in which venture capital funds no longer urged quick sales and compensated entrepreneurs who wanted to take their companies as far as they could go. According to Shochat, the first golden age was in the 1990s, "when new army technology propelled Israel into the high tech scene."

At The Marker’s TechNovation Conference in July 2020, Shochat offered participants productivity and organizational tips, among them keeping lists (he carries around a paper scratch pad), sorting tasks into categories, not setting unrealistic timetables and leaving windows of time without meetings.

== Awards and recognition ==
In 2014, Shochat was named Investor of the Year by Geektime Magazine.

== See also ==
- Start-up Nation
- Venture capital in Israel
- Silicon Wadi
- Economy of Israel
- Science and technology in Israel
