= Schochet =

Schochet, Shochet (Hebrew: שוחט), Shoihet (Hebrew: שויחט), Shaikhet (Hebrew: שייחט), Shochat/Shohat, etc. are variations of an occupational surname derived from the Hebrew word shochet for "kosher slaughterer". Notable persons with that name include:

- Amanda Schochet, founder of MICRO
- Arkady Shaikhet (1898–1959), Soviet photographer
- Aryeh Leib Schochet (1845–1928), Ukrainian rabbi
- Chaim Schochet (born 1987), American real estate manager and developer
- Ezra Schochet, American rabbi
- Jacob Immanuel Schochet (1935–2013), Canadian rabbi
- Rebecca Shoichet, Canadian voice actress
- Shaul Yedidya Shochet
- Simeon Shoihet (1931–2010), Soviat and Moldovan architect
- Yitzchak Schochet, British rabbi
- David Suchet, British actor

== See also ==
- ru:Шайхет, ru:Шойхет
