= Impractical Jokers season 10 =

Impractical Jokers
- Season 10
- No. of episodes: 21

Release
- Original network: truTV; TBS
- Original release: February 9, 2023 – August 29, 2024

Season chronology
- ← Previous; Season 9 Next → Season 11

The tenth season of Impractical Jokers premiered on February 9, 2023 and it concluded on August 1, 2024. It is also the first season to be simulcast on truTV and TBS, and the last season to be broadcast on the original network for the show. This is also the first full season without Joe Gatto, following his departure from the show in the previous season.

== Episodes ==
No. overall	No. in season	Title	Original air date	Losing Joker(s)	Viewers (millions) (TBS/Tru)
232	1	"Bret Michaels"	February 9, 2023	Murr	0.37 / 0.17
The Jokers try to commit insurance fraud at a grocery store by using strangers to support them as a "witness" and play a game of hide and seek in an office where someone is looking for a missing binder. Punishment: At Connolly's Pub & Restaurant, Murr has the waiter pass random notes written on his behalf. He must also interact with the customers as commanded by Bret, Q, Sal, and surprise guest Paul Rudd. When Murr later writes a message to pass on behalf of Bret, the recipient is his wife Melyssa. Finally, he has to serenade everyone with a parody of "Every Rose Has Its Thorn".
233	2	"Post Malone"	February 16, 2023	Q	0.42 / 0.22
The guys are at the American Dream Meadowlands mall where they have to tell people to mind their manners and try to get talent to recall bizarre details of an item during a live product review. Punishment: Q has to pose as the boss of Little Man Parking (parking garage attendant), and has to take the blame for whatever happened inside people's cars while Post Malone joins in as his assistant. Note: This episode is dedicated to Benjamin Cat, Q's oldest "son", who was the main inspiration behind the eponymous recurring mascot who torments Sal.
234	3	"Anthony Davis"	February 23, 2023	Sal	0.49 / 0.21
The Jokers get strangers to corroborate an excuse to their bosses over a video call and pitch business ideas to focus groups with Steve Byrne trying to undermine the presentations. Punishment: In order to win two pairs of Anthony's special sneakers, worth US$5,000, Sal, described as a sneakerhead, faces multiple dilemmas between completing challenges or having the sneakers get damaged. But the final challenge is deciding whether to give them to a kid who won a free throw contest or keep them for himself.
235	4	"John Mayer"	March 2, 2023	Murr	0.38 / 0.18
The Jokers must persuade a temp worker to pretend to be their senior vice president for a meeting with some Japanese investors and John, and get the hire to agree to join them for dinner. Punishment: Murr plays a stage manager for John's acoustic gig. He annoys the audience members by moving them around, and other random tasks. When John takes the stage, he interrupts the show and has him restart "Your Body is a Wonderland" multiple times. After being told to leave by John, Murr has to go to the washroom and take a dump while his mic is on. Note: This episode is dedicated to Murr's mother Maryann.
236	5	"Kesha"	March 9, 2023	Sal	0.40 / 0.19
The Jokers try to fall in love with unsuspecting women that assist them using weird lines given by the other guys and compete against MJF in a series of ridiculous debates at the American Dream Meadowlands mall as baristas. Punishment: Sal participates as an assistant to Kesha in a seance, but is given electrical shocks by Murr and Q. (Note: The device used to administer the shocks is the same one used in the episode "Adam Pally & Jon Gabrus".)
237	6	"Sideline Smack Talk"	March 19, 2023	clip show	0.47 (TruTV)
Casey Jost and former NFL player / chef Eddie Jackson comment on highlights and bonus footage from the ninth and tenth seasons. The show aired on TruTV following the Sunday night broadcast of the NCAA basketball tournament game.
238	7	"Paul Scheer"	March 30, 2023	Sal & Murr	0.33 / 0.20
The Joker gives a private pickleball lesson while doing what the other guys tell him and convince customers at a coffee shop to give up their gift cards for being the "100th customer" for odd reasons. Punishment: Sal and Murr are contestants in Q's game show called Tails, hosted by Paul. They have to taste the furry tails of various animals and then guess what they are.
239	8	"Kal Penn"	April 6, 2023	Sal	0.42 / 0.15
The Joker must climb through a window to try to sell an item to someone in a waiting room to see who gets the most money and has to finish a plate of food chosen by the other Jokers in the American Dream Meadowlands mall food court before someone finishes telling him a personal story. Punishment: Sal acts as the sound tech for an interview between Kal and a guest speaker, but must tell the guest multiple times that their breath stinks. The second guest gets really suspicious and warns Sal not to say any more. Then Kal turns the tides and tells Sal that it is Sal's breath that stinks.
240	9	"Bruce Campbell"	April 13, 2023	Q	0.41 / 0.16
The Jokers try to get customers at a coffee shop to buy an item despite Rosanna Scotto accusing them of foul play and act as waiters at Dallas BBQ and have to do and say whatever the others tell them. Punishment: Lifelong Evil Dead fan Q has to perfectly recreate key scenes from the first two films or else Bruce will not sign the release form to appear on the show.
241	10	"Blake Anderson"	April 27, 2023	Sal	0.19 (TruTV)
The Jokers try to convince customers at a restaurant to pay bogus surcharges and get approval for questionable high school yearbook dedications. Punishment: In a focus group hosted by Johnna (producer) and Blake, whenever the lights go out, Sal must steal marijuana cookies off the other attendants plates. Blake gets extremely annoyed that the cookies are being taken. Note: This episode is dedicated to Murr's father, Jim. Mr. Murray made cameo appearances during Murr's punishments in "Centaur of Attention" and "Remember the Pact". TBS had aired an NHL playoff game.
242	11	"Bobby Moynihan"	February 8, 2024	Murr	N/A (Note: On June 30, 2023, Showbuzz Daily announced that network TV ratings were no longer being publicized.)
The guys try to get people to use bizarre telemarketing tactics. Later they must get a stranger to help threaten their misbehaving daughter at a supermarket. Punishment: Murr poses as a tailor helping women pick out their wedding dress and has to do and say whatever the other guys tell him to. To finish the punishment early, Bobby forces Murr to swallow his own wedding ring but as it turns out that is not the end of the punishment because now he has to catch his plane at the airport in a wedding dress.
243	12	"Kim Fields"	February 15, 2024	Q	N/A
The guys mingle with guests at the Liberty Science Center After Dark event, and pitch their crazy new products to pet owners in the park. Punishment: Kim goes down an escalator at the American Dream Meadowlands mall and says something that is okay for a woman to say but not a man. After she goes down, Q has to go down the escalator and say the exact same thing. The Jokers put Kim in a fake baby bump for her to say "I'm so scared about what I have to push out of my body soon. Two big ones." Finally, Kim goes rogue, making up her own line: she tells somebody that she fired their "stank black ass". Q has to repeat it to end the punishment.
244	13	"Paula Abdul"	February 22, 2024	Sal	N/A
The guys pose as directors getting extras to act out bizarre scenes written by the other guys and get bystanders to retrieve their wallets after being kicked out for embarrassing reasons. Punishment: Sal has to ruin Paula's luncheon with fans by saying whatever the Jokers tell him to say. At the end, one of the directors tells Sal his COVID test came back positive and forces him to leave.
245	14	"Eric André Returns"	February 29, 2024	Sal	N/A
The guys ask parkgoers to watch their respective grandmas. Then they and a stranger answer interview questions without laughing. Punishment: At the American Dream Meadowlands mall, unlike Eric who portrays the good clown, Sal has to act as the bad clown around children and mallgoers. At the end of the punishment Eric accidentally spills milk on a child and leaves Sal to deal with the aftermath, only to return with a crew from Dumb F**ks, the prank show from his previous appearance, revealing to Sal that the boy was in on the punishment.
246	15	"ALF"	March 7, 2024	Q	N/A
The guys try to give away movie tickets for made-up movies to strangers in the park. Then they play a round of "Did I Overreact?" in a waiting room. Punishment: Q plays on a televised show with ALF and tries to guess the mysterious ingredients he's tasting in each dish from the latter's cookbook. At the end, all of the disgusting meals are blended together and he must drink it.
247	16	"Michael Ian Black"	March 7, 2024	Sal	N/A
The guys go through a hilarious text exchange challenge at a mall food court, and then pose as security guards at a department store. Punishment: Sal gets into the holiday spirit and he must do and say whatever the Jokers tell him to while working as an elf caterer during an orientation meeting with a group at Michael's Christmas charity event.
248	17	"Harvey Guillen"	April 6, 2024	Q	N/A
The guys get focus group participants to sign up on their bizarre contract items and play some more "No Disrespect" at various locations. Punishment: Q is forced to get prosthetics with an orange beard and hair and must "create characters" at a bar with Harvey as he tells him the awful things he must say to other patrons. This is the last new episode to air on TruTv
249	18	"Joey Fatone"	July 11, 2024	Joey Fatone	TBA
Q, Murr, Sal and Joey Fatone take part as bad receptionists. Then, Q goes up against Joey to get patrons to an answer an unexpected phone call. Punishment: While hosting the pilot for a dance party themed TV show, Joey receives the same treatment from each Joker's respective previous punishments which includes Murr's Novocaine punishment, Q's Stage Musical punishment, Sal's 'Dizzy Waiter' and Escape room punishments and the triple permanent punishment that saw him getting a tattoo that reads 'Joey Fartone's Dance Party'.
250	19	"Roy Wood Jr."	July 18, 2024	Murr	TBA
Q, Murr, and Sal cast strangers for a fake crime drama, then go head-to-head pitching new products with Roy Wood Jr. Punishment: While waiting in the White Castle drive thru, Murr is commanded by the Jokers and Roy, Jr. to shout horrendous things to the strangers in front of him as they are waiting for their order.
251	20	"Outtakes and Chill"	August 1, 2024	clip show	TBA
Q and Murr hang around watching outtakes, as they wait for Sal to show up with dinner.
252	21	"Servin' Up Laughs"	August 29, 2024	clip show	TBA

Punishment Count:

- Sal - 8 (including joint punishments) Total now: 85
- Murr - 5 (including joint punishments) Total now: 77
- Q - 5 (including joint punishments) Total now: 61
- Joey Fatone - 1
