= Innovid =

American online advertising technology company

- Company type: Private company
- Industry: Ad Tech, Software, Advertising
- Founded: 2007
- Headquarters: New York, NY
- Area served: Worldwide
- Number of employees: ~900
- Parent: Mediaocean
- Website: www.innovid.com

Innovid is an American online advertising technology company that offers services used by advertisers and publishers for the distribution and management of digital ads. Originally launched as a video marketing platform, the company expanded its offering to include display and digital out-of-home when Herolens was acquired in 2019.

== History ==
Innovid was founded in 2007 by Zvika Netter, Tal Chalozin, and Zack Zigdon. Prior to starting Innovid, Netter and Chalozin co-founded the tech hub and nonprofit organization GarageGeeks where high-profile tech personalities from around the world came to speak about innovation, including Sergey Brin, Craig Mundie, and Wikipedia co-founder Jimmy Wales.

Between 2008 and 2019, Innovid raised more than $82 billion in funding.

As of 2015, the company had raised $52.6 million in six rounds of funding from investors including Genesis Partners, NewSpring Capital, Silicon Valley Bank, Cisco Investments, and Sequoia Capital.

In 2017, Innovid acquired Taykey, a Tel Aviv-based company focused on real-time, automatic ad targeting software.

In 2019, Innovid acquired Herolens, a Buenos Aires-based display and digital out-of-home advertising company.

In February 2022, Innovid announced that it would acquire TVSquared for $160 million.

== Technology/platform ==
=== Ad Serving ===
Innovid provides independent ad serving technology for CTV, digital video, display, social, and audio advertising.

The company's ad server supports cross-channel campaigns and their measurement. It includes functions for formatting creative assets for different publisher requirements and monitoring delivery and performance data.

=== AI ===
In November 2025, Innovid launched Orchestrator, an AI-powered workflow platform and AI agents designed to coordinate data, creative, and media execution across advertising channels.

== Corporate affairs ==
=== Leadership ===
Innovid is managed by CEO Zvika Netter. Other key executives are:

- Tal Chalozin, CTO
- Zack Zigdon, MD International
- Guy Kuperman, CSO
- Ken Markus, CCO

== Partnerships ==
Innovid partnered with Roku to deliver personalized, targeted, and interactive video ads via Roku apps and allow viewers to easily subscribe to specific channels with a click of the remote.

In February 2016, Innovid announced a partnership with Snapchat, to provide advertisers with detailed analytics about ad campaigns. Two months later, Innovid rolled out an integration with Facebook and Instagram, to help marketers deliver interactive video ads to both platforms while tracking analytics. In June 2016, Innovid also teamed up with Twitter to give advertisers access to more data about Twitter video ad campaigns. In December 2016, Innovid partnered with marketing clouds Oracle, Adobe, and IBM, enabling marketers for the first time to include video throughout the customer journey.

MODI Media, the TV arm of GroupM, recognized Innovid’s focus on the connected TV/ OTT market and began collaborating with the company to empower MODI Media’s OTT video delivery and analytics.

In September 2019, Innovid and Roku announced that they were partnering on advertising measurement tools that would report across over-the-top (OTT) and traditional TV. Innovid's connected TV data would be matched with Roku's automatic content recognition (ACR) data to measure daily reach, frequency, and demographics.

== Awards ==
1. 2009 Tech Pioneers Who Will Change Your Life: Zvika Netter
2. 2010 World Economic Forum Tech Pioneers: Tal Chalozin
3. 2011 Streaming Media 100 Companies That Matter Most in Online Video
4. 2012 Digiday Video Awards Best Video Technology Innovation
5. 2014 Digiday Video Awards Best In-Stream Video Ad
6. 2014 Interactive Advertising Bureau MIXX IAB Rising Stars Digital Video Ad Gold Winner
7. 2015 Crain’s Best Places to Work in NYC
8. 2015 Interactive Advertising Bureau MIXX IAB Rising Stars Digital Video Ad Gold Winner
9. 2015 AdAge's Best Places to Work
10. 2016 Inc. Magazine's Best Workplaces
11. 2016 Multichannel News' 40 Under 40
12. 2016 Stevie Award Winner for Women in Business: Beth-Ann Eason
13. 2016 Interactive Advertising Bureau MIXX IAB Award: Best Interactive Video Ad
14. 2016 Crain Communications Best Places To Work in New York City
15. 2016 Los Angeles Business Journal Best Places To Work in Los Angeles
16. 2018 Drum Digital Trading Award for Best Creative Optimization

== Patents ==
US Patent No. 8745657 Inserting interactive objects into video content
