= Impractical Jokers season 13 =

Impractical Jokers
- Season 13
- No. of episodes: 7

Release
- Original network: TBS
- Original release: July 23, 2026

Season chronology
- ← Previous; Season 12

The thirteenth and also the current season of Impractical Jokers premiered on July 23, 2026 on TBS. The season is currently on hiatus with an unknown return date.

== Episodes ==
No. overall	No. in season	Title	Original air date	Losing Joker(s)	U.S. viewers (millions)
288	1	"Meal, Interrupted"	July 23, 2026	Murr	TBA
The Jokers have to do and say what they're told by the others while help a parkgoer assists with their broken down car. Then Adam Ray joins the Jokers in a team challenge at a funeral home where they pretend to be corpses in a coffin and must complete tasks without getting caught by a temp worker. Punishment: Q and Sal take Murr are back to Fandi Mata to course correct his punishment from "Meat Cute". Instead of shoving meat bites into diners' mouths, he has to clear their entire table before they are finished their meals.
289	2	"Lean, Mean, Time Machine"	July 30, 2026	Q	TBA
Sal, Q and Murr cause havoc while they are pretending to be terrible office receptionists, then the guys try to convince strangers to join the line for a wacky pop-up event by the others. Punishment: Q steps into a "time machine" and he pretends to be a man from the future. He must complete various tasks at the Carnegie Diner in order to supposedly prevent bad things from happening in the future, based on fake newspaper pages that he is given.
290	3	"Celebrity Crushed"	August 6, 2026	Sal	TBA
The Jokers make mischief by overreacting when a new focus group friend suffers a very minor injustice, then try they to impress someone using the cringiest pick-up lines possible. Punishment: Sal becomes the star of his own sitcom set that is in his former childhood bedroom which also contained posters of his celebrity crush Alyssa Milano. He then gets a surprise visit from her in the flesh and has to recite actual love letters he once wrote for her.
291	4	"Valet Villain"	August 13, 2026	Murr	TBA
The guys win the world's worst dad awards by surprising their kid with a trip before cruelly taking it away in front of a stranger, and then they get caught taking ridiculous notes in a focus group. Punishement: Murr works as a terrible valet attendant at Pine, doing and saying whatever the other guys tell him to while patrons drop off and come get their cars.
292	5	"Last Action Zero"	August 20, 2026	Sal	TBA
The guys do and say what they're told while posing as employees in training working at Playa Bowls, and hand out bizarre business cards to people they think could use their services. Punishement: Sal plays the role of a character named "Mr. Bong" and must record a series of bizarre self-defense training videos, most of which involve him beating up old people.
293	6	"A Ruff Day At The Park"	August 27, 2026	Sal	TBA
The guys ask strangers to retrieve personal items they "accidentally" threw out an apartment window in an argument with their fake wives, then they try not to laugh or smirk during a snack taste test at the supermarket. Punishment: Sal goes to the dog park and must awkwardly talk about dogs' butts and take pictures of all of the dogs’ butts, despite not having a dog himself.
294	7	"Guest of Dishonor"	September 3, 2026	Sal	TBA
The guys pose as truck watchmen who must do and say whatever they are told when the next employee comes to relieve them of their duty, then they must rally bystanders into a chant when they are arrested by police for an odd reason at a café. Punishment: Sal must pose as "Aunt Sally" at a wedding reception for Ali and Dominic (who are in on it) while making rude remarks to the staff and other guests, give a speech, and shove a stuntwoman posing as another guest during the bouquet toss.

Punishment Count:

- Murr - 2 (including joint punishments) Total now: 95
- Sal - 4 (including joint punishments) Total now: 103
- Q - 1 (including joint punishments) Total now: 70
