= Impractical Jokers season 12 =

Impractical Jokers
- Season 12
- No. of episodes: 18

Release
- Original network: TBS
- Original release: July 10, 2025 – March 20, 2026

Season chronology
- ← Previous; Season 11 Next → Season 13

The twelfth season of Impractical Jokers premiered on July 10, 2025.

== Episodes ==
| No. overall | No. in season | Title | Original air date | Losing Joker(s) | U.S. viewers (millions) |
|---|---|---|---|---|---|
| 270 | 1 | "The Endless Esophagus" | July 10, 2025 | Sal | 0.287 |
The guys pose as maintenance workers in an office building while inside of a vent, and they must do and say whatever they're told to a temp worker. Then, they read out bizarre names to patrons at a bagel shop. Punishment: Sal poses as a sword swallower alongside a professional and he attempts to swallow a bunch of large items like swords, lightsabers, and more while in front of a large crowd. Sal's dad makes an appearance.
| 271 | 2 | "Call of the Wild" | July 17, 2025 | Q | 0.321 |
The guys do and say whatever they are told while working as dry cleaners, and pose as casting directors looking for extras to play bizarre roles at the American Dream mall. Punishment: Q has to pose as a ticket taker and he must read embarrassing animal related lines written by the other guys to people that are walking in for a concert.
| 272 | 3 | "Facial Awareness" | July 24, 2025 | Murr | 0.317 |
The Jokers face off by recording voice overs for a fake video game and play the concerned parent writing emails to their kid's principal. Punishment: The other guys force Murr to have the left side of his face microneedled to give the impression that he was burned. He then gives a firework safety presentation at a firehouse, including a bizarre and embarrassing anecdote explaining how he burned his face.
| 273 | 4 | "Customer Disservice" | July 31, 2025 | Sal | 0.305 |
Joey Fatone interviews the Jokers for a fake documentary, and at a food market they react to an overly emotional phone call for an ridiculous reason and ask strangers if they overreacted. Punishment: Sal poses as a grocery store manager in charge of customer service at the self checkout lane, and he has pictures on a pin board with customers that have been banned. He is forced to ban customers from the store and do and say whatever rude things the other guys tell him to.
| 274 | 5 | "Rage Baiter" | August 7, 2025 | Q | 0.336 |
The Jokers hit the grocery store aisles dressed in absurd disguises, doing and saying whatever the other guys tell them to while staying in character. They then train new telemarketing employees by using aggressive phone tactics for bogus charity donations. Punishment: Q is forced to attend a scientific study at a college with a group of others, and their brains are "monitored". When the instructor goes through images on a slideshow, Q must explain his unpopular opinions on the emotions that are displayed.
| 275 | 6 | "Mind, Body, Swole" | August 14, 2025 | Sal | 0.375 |
The Jokers try not to smirk as they answer survey questions for a new snack food at a grocery store and pose as pharmaceutical advertising execs presenting the worst ad campaigns. Punishment: Sal live streams himself as an obnoxious content creator and must read off a script and do and say whatever he's told to other gym-goers at Vibe BQE Fitness.
| 276 | 7 | "Meat Cute" | August 21, 2025 | Murr | 0.243 |
The Jokers take pictures of grocery store shoppers for strange reasons and pose as horrible employees at the YETI store, trying to get the lowest customer service score possible. Punishment: Murr is forced to pose as a waiter at a packed restaurant and put cubes of beef or beets into diner's mouths without asking.
| 277 | 8 | "Dopamine Denier" | August 28, 2025 | Sal | 0.217 |
The Jokers do and say with what they're told to while starring in a fake flu medicine commercial. Then they attempt to get shoppers to agree about looking like the type of person. Punishment: Sal works the front desk as a security guard at CompleteBody where he has to make sure certain gym-goers do not enter for a very specific reason that's given to him by the Jokers and Tyler Hoechlin whom he let in.
| 278 | 9 | "Hoop! There It Is!" | September 4, 2025 | Murr | 0.227 |
The Jokers pretend to be medical students in training with standardized patient actors, then play the hero and break up a public fight, hoping to earn applause. Punishment: Murr supposedly claimed to the other Jokers that he could hula hoop for an hour straight without it falling to the ground. To test this, Sal and Q set up a fake UFC-style event where they force Murr to spin a hula hoop for as long as possible to see if he can actually do it for an hour. He ultimately only lasts around two and a half minutes before the hula hoop falls to the ground, causing him to face ridicule from the audience.
| 279 | 10 | "Haunting of the Joker House" | January 15, 2026 | Sal | TBA |
The Jokers ask strangers to pose as their partners in front of their overprotective mothers, then try to get strangers to approve their pet eulogies. Punishment: Sal must talk on the phone with his cable company in order to cancel his cable subscription while walking through the 13th Hour escape room/haunted house. After completing the tasks, he receives a greeting from the Jokers and crew members, only to get pied in the face by Lou Ferrigno.
| 280 | 11 | "Revenge of the Joker" | January 22, 2026 | Q and Sal | TBA |
The Jokers play lawyers trying to convince unsuspecting focus group participants to sign off on ridiculous terms and conditions before they go in. Then they put their family businesses to the test by asking strangers if their radio ad is good to stay on the air. Punishment: As revenge for years of humiliation and pain endured during his past punishments, Murr shackles Q and Sal to boards, forcing them to play a Saw-themed game titled "Balls!" (specifically as revenge for Q's "Tails!" and Sal's "Heads!") Q and Sal must complete tasks (mostly involving them showing their respect and admiration for Murr) while Murr sets off various Rube Goldberg machines that result in them being hit in their groins.
| 281 | 12 | "Vac Attack" | January 29, 2026 | Murr | TBA |
The Jokers do and say what they told out in the dining room while posing the managers of John's Pizzeria, then they go to Tompinks Square Bagels and try to convince patrons to leave a positive review after reading a ridiculous fake negative review. Punishment: Murr poses as a janitor at Pier 17 cleaning up before an outdoor screening of Forrest Gump and must suck up random items with a vacuum. Meanwhile, the show's production crew members each have Bingo cards with spots that are filled when Murr sucks up the corresponding items. Eventually, one of them gets a Bingo, and the punishment ends.
| 282 | 13 | "Subscribe to Survive" | February 5, 2026 | Q | TBA |
Q, Murr, Sal and Justin Long go head to head as wacky inventors, presenting a whole new line of AI-themed gadgets. Then the Jokers try to win a gift card by reporting on a strange incident at a cafe. Teddy Swims appears during Sal's goal of that challenge. Punishment: Q has to approach various people in the park and get them to sign up for interactive apps designed by the guys. Some of the features of these "apps" include being tackled by request, being lassoed and hog-tied by a cowgirl, and hiring someone to point out your flaws. Eventually, Q gets someone to sign up for one of the fake apps, concluding the punishment.
| 283 | 14 | "Me, My Selfie, and Eye" | February 19, 2026 | Sal | TBA |
The Jokers pretend to be bellhops and need to do and say what they're told while assisting unsuspecting guests to their hotel rooms. Then, the guys need to give away tickets to an absurd made-up show they can no longer see. Punishment: During Sal's goal in the second challenge, with the help from Q, Murr gets revenge on Sal for the tooth selfie punishment by making him remove the sunglasses that were protecting his gross eye injury and take selfies with fans who then post their images on social media.
| 284 | 15 | "The Founding Joker" | February 26, 2026 | Murr | TBA |
The Jokers try to get customers to order bizarre menu items. Then, they try to get parkgoers to help them get back up from a bike fall even amidst a barrage of insults they must give. The Potash Twins make an appearance during the second challenge. Punishment: Murr re-enacts George Washington's final living moments in front of an audience at Fraunces Tavern. To ensure historical accuracy, the other Jokers have the show's staff put leeches on him, just like how Washington's doctors attempted to treat him via bloodletting.
| 285 | 16 | "A Tight Spot" | March 5, 2026 | Sal | TBA |
The Jokers hatch horrible revenge schemes on their office bullies that a new worker has to agree with, then the guys put one contractor through the wringer as they attempt home improvement projects with them. Punishment: Murr and Q borrow a sports car for Sal to drive around a parking lot. He must intentionally park extremely close to other cars, then deal with the aftermath when people come back to them. After interacting with the strangers, usually involving him acting extremely rude as directed by the other two guys, Sal must also get them to purchase chocolate bars for a "fundraiser." However, Sal fails to sell any chocolate bars, so in retaliation for the punishment, he drives off after the last interaction.
| 286 | 17 | "Let's Get Crackin'" | March 19, 2026 | Murr | TBA |
The Jokers are unsympathetic store managers, forced to throw out a disruptive customer before dealing with the wrath and disdain of fellow patrons. Then, the guys must get a bystander to take their side during a heated argument with their fake spouses except Sal who went head to head with Adam Ray. Punishment: At The Mysterious Bookshop where Brad Meltzer hosted a promotional event for his book The Viper, Murr has to crack open and also eat three pounds of lobster much to the dismay of several spectators in attendance which ends with him getting kicked out by Meltzer.
| 287 | 18 | "Happily Never After" | March 20, 2026 | Murr | TBA |
The Jokers ask strangers to send an important text to their loved ones while working at a bar, and ask people at the mall for help finding their missing kid using crazy descriptions. Punishment: The wedding bells are ringing at Park Chateau, except for one videographer. During the cocktail hour, the other guys tell Murr all the rude things he must do and say while recording guests who are congratulating the bride and groom, who are in on the punishment. At the end, the guys force him to walk backwards into the cake while taking a picture, knocking it over.

Punishment Count:

- Murr - 7 (including joint punishments) Total now: 93
- Sal - 8 (including joint punishments) Total now: 99
- Q - 4 (including joint punishments) Total now: 69
