= SolarEdge =

Israeli technology company

SolarEdge Technologies, Inc.

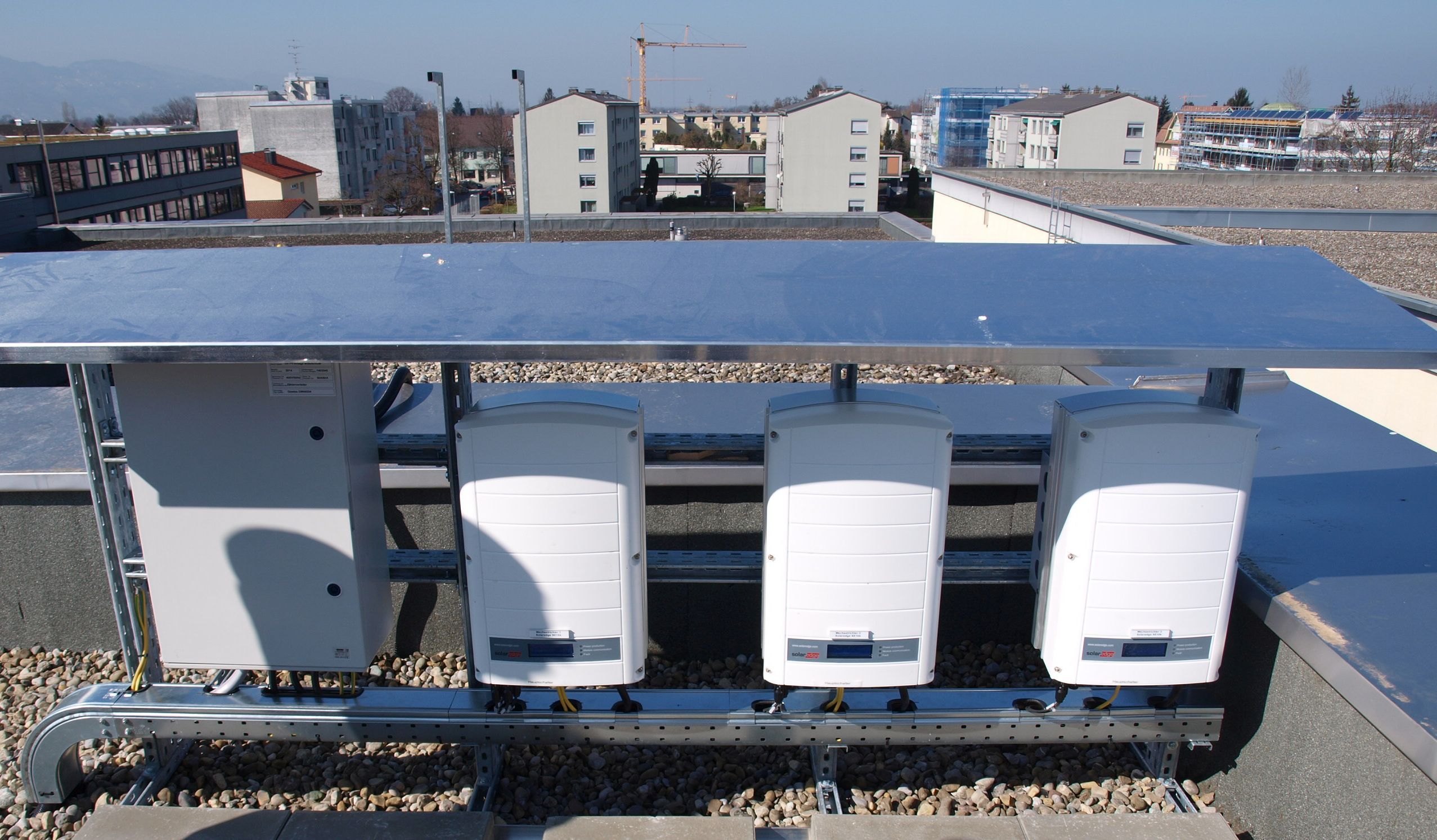
- SolarEdge inverters on the roof of a high school in Austria in 2014
- Type: Public
- Traded as: Nasdaq: SEDG; S&P 600 component
- Industry: Renewable energy
- Founded: 2006; 20 years ago
- Headquarters: Herzliya, Israel
- Key people: Shuki Nir (CEO)
- Products: Solar inverters; Power optimizers; Energy storage batteries; Monitoring systems
- Revenue: US$1.18 billion (2025)
- Operating income: US$301.7 million (2025)
- Net income: US$1,405.4 million (2025)
- Total assets: US$2.18 billion (2025)
- Total equity: US$427.5 million (2025)
- Number of employees: 3,576 (2025)
- Website: solaredge.com
- Footnotes; Financials as of December 31, 2025. References

SolarEdge Technologies, Inc. is an Israeli company that produces DC optimized inverter systems. SolarEdge was founded in 2006, began mass production in 2009, and completed an initial public offering on the Nasdaq in March 2015. In 2023, SolarEdge became the most losing stock in the S&P 500 for the year, which resulted in its removal from the index.

== History ==
SolarEdge was established in 2006 by Guy Sella, Lior Handelsman, Yoav Galin, Meir Adest, and Amir Fishelov. The company was backed by venture capital from GE Energy Financial Services, Norwest Venture Partners, Lightspeed Venture Partners, ORR Partners, Genesis Partners, Walden International, Vertex Ventures Israel, JP Asia Capital and Opus Capital Ventures.

The company started mass production of its products by contract manufacturer Flex at the end of 2009.

In March 2015, SolarEdge had an initial public offering of 7,000,000 shares of its common stock at a price to the public of $18.00 per share, raising $126 million. The shares began trading on the NASDAQ Global Select Market under the ticker symbol “SEDG.” Goldman Sachs and Deutsche Bank acted as joint book-running managers for the offering.

In May 2015, SolarEdge partnered with Tesla Energy to develop an inverter that could charge the Tesla Powerwall home energy storage battery that was unveiled in April 2015. The SolarEdge inverter manages both the conversion of energy from solar panels along with charging and discharging of the Powerwall. Over time, Tesla phased out its partnership with SolarEdge, with Tesla adding an inverter to its Powerwall 2 that was introduced in October 2016, and introducing its own solar inverter in January 2021.

In October 2018, SolarEdge announced agreements to acquire a major stake in Kokam, a South Korean provider of lithium-ion battery cells, batteries and energy storage solutions. In January 2019, SolarEdge announced the acquisition of a majority stake in SMRE – an Italian EV powertrain manufacturer. In 2019 SolarEdge announced the acquisition of Gamatronic, a UPS manufacturer, and established its Critical Power division.

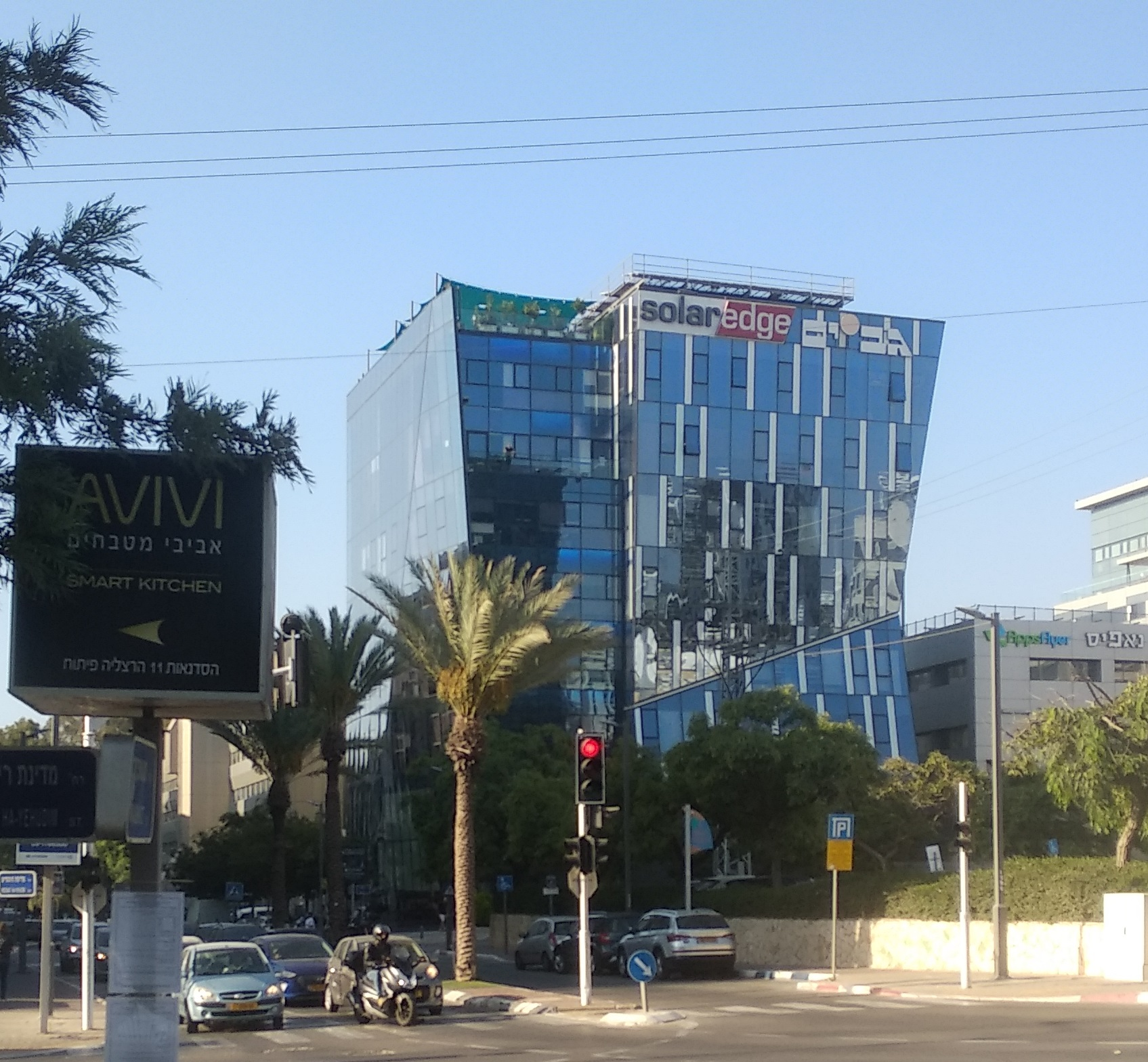
SolarEdge HQ in Herzliya

In January 2023, SolarEdge announced the acquisition of Hark Systems – a European-Based Energy Analytics and IoT Company.

Following a battle with cancer, founder Guy Sella died in 2019. Former vice president of global sales Zvi Lando, was appointed as CEO.

In November 2024, SolarEdge announced that it was closing its Energy Storage division impacting approximately 500 employees most of whom are located in South Korea.

In December 2024, Shuki Nir was appointed as the new CEO, replacing interim CEO, Ronen Faier.

== See also ==
- Solar inverter
- Photovoltaic system
- Photovoltaics
- List of photovoltaics companies
- Solar energy
