= Impractical Jokers season 8 =

Impractical Jokers
- Season 8
- No. of episodes: 26

Release
- Original network: truTV
- Original release: March 28, 2019 – March 5, 2020

Season chronology
- ← Previous; Season 7 Next → Season 9

The eighth season of Impractical Jokers premiered on March 28, 2019.

== Episodes ==
| No. overall | No. in season | Title | Original air date | Losing Joker(s) | U.S. viewers (millions) |
|---|---|---|---|---|---|
| 180 | 1 | "Crash Test Dummies" | March 28, 2019 | Murr and Sal | 0.58 |
The guys compete as taxi cab drivers, doing and saying what the guys tell them to, and then try to enlist a stranger into helping them make messes at a grocery store. Punishment: At a demolition derby's half-time show, Sal and Murr are forced to compete in a Monster Jam to see whose prized possession will be crushed. Murr's is an expensive Segway set and Sal's is an Impractical Jokers-themed pinball machine. The game ends in a tie, leading Joe and Q to order both items to be crushed by a zombie-themed monster truck.
| 181 | 2 | "The Closer" | April 4, 2019 | Murr | 0.50 |
The guys get tutored on how to use PowerPoint at a library, and play a four-way game of hot potato with strangers' shoes at a shoe store. Punishment: Murr goes to a cafe full of customers working on their laptops, and close their laptops for no reason until the others allow him to stop. To conclude the punishment, the guys have Murr kiss show crew members—producer Dan Cast and locations manager Steven Hopper—until they eventually trick him into kissing a stranger who does not work on the show.
| 182 | 3 | "Tipping Point" | April 11, 2019 | Sal | 0.56 |
The guys pose as waiting room receptionists and then try to convince strangers to not use a particular restroom. Punishment: Sal poses as a delivery person delivering lunches to a company, but must criticize the customers for providing too low of tips, no matter the amount.
| 183 | 4 | "Full Mental Jacket" | April 18, 2019 | Joe | 0.54 |
The guys play "you refuse, you lose" challenges, first while posing as nurses at a hospital and then while doing some grocery shopping with their fake wives. Punishment: Joe works at a cloakroom taking the coats of fashion show attendees to hang up. The guys, however, order him to take each of the coats and walk the runway wearing them as the only model. As the audience becomes increasingly upset, Joe eventually throws all the rest of the coats in a pile.
| 184 | 5 | "Blue Man Dupe" | April 25, 2019 | Q | 0.49 |
The guys give ridiculous reasons on why they should pay for strangers' groceries, and get strangers' help to reply to weird text messages in a waiting room. Punishment: At a Blue Man Group event, Q is forced to rudely ask strangers to get out of their seat; because he thinks that the seat is his, where he later finds an error on his ticket. Later, Q must sit in the front row when the show starts in just his clothes, unlike in a poncho—like everyone else, and get disgusting substances all over him, and made a mess of with things like toilet paper.
| 185 | 6 | "The Dumbbell" | May 2, 2019 | Murr | 0.51 |
The guys go to Dekalb Market Hall to read three entries of their daughters' diaries to strangers and team up to give normal presentations while doing and saying whatever the others tell them to. Punishment: Murr is forced to go to a gym, and pull insults out of a fanny pack to insult the tattoos of various buff people working out at the gym.
| 186 | 7 | "The Eggman" | May 9, 2019 | Joe | 0.56 |
The guys dress up with various costumes trying to fool receptionists, and convince strangers to give up their gifted gift cards. Punishment: Joe is forced to enter a meeting as a janitor, finding, cracking and eating five hard-boiled eggs hidden throughout the room, much to the dismay of the other patrons.
| 187 | 8 | "Cake Loss" | May 23, 2019 | Q | 0.59 |
The guys mean no disrespect towards strangers at a food court, then they act as tailors, and ask strangers to settle ridiculous debates. Punishment: Q is forced to pose as a judge at a cake decorating contest, and he must ruin the contestants' cakes. But, it is later revealed to Q that he is a contestant and not a judge, when the real judges come out to judge the cakes. Because he ruined all the other cakes, Q ends up winning, causing other contestants to be dismayed as they pose for a victory photo with an embarrassed Q.
| 188 | 9 | "The Antisocial Network" | May 30, 2019 | Q | 0.56 |
The guys act as matchmakers at a mall food court and team up to give architectural proposals via presentations to strangers. Punishment: Q must attend a networking event at the rooftop bar at 230 Fifth Avenue, where he has to find one person to continually follow around the entire time. He meets a man named Chris to follow around. Although Chris tries to lose Q, it does not work until Chris eventually tells Q he is having a private conversation with a woman.
| 189 | 10 | "Off the Reservation" | August 8, 2019 | Sal | 0.51 |
The Jokers try not to laugh alongside strangers being interviewed for a fake documentary at a food court and compete head-to-head in a tournament shooting marshmallows into shoppers cart at a supermarket. Punishment: Sal is forced to serve as the bouncer for Delmonico's steak house in Manhattan, and purposely not give customers their reserved tables. The punishment ends when Sal gets $20 from someone to prioritize seating.
| 190 | 11 | "Fraudway" | August 15, 2019 | Murr | 0.47 |
The guys play the "Laugh Man Standing" challenge, and team up as customers at a chicken restaurant. Punishment: Murr is forced to be the world's worst cameraman for Yanni, one of his favorite musicians, at a Broadway concert, and later he tries to play "One Man's Dream" on piano, one of Yanni's songs, but he fails horribly.
| 191 | 12 | "The Show Stopper" | August 22, 2019 | Q | 0.55 |
At Universal Studios Hollywood, the guys survey park-goers and then pose as park maintenance workers while answering questions over a walkie-talkie with crazy one-liners. Punishment: Q is forced to repeatedly stop the Studio Tour ride for ridiculous reasons by using an emergency brake rope whenever the other guys tell him to. Eventually, Q is removed from the tour by security, to the applause of everyone on the ride. Unbeknownst to Q, the tour guide is in on the punishment, and by ride's end, everyone on the tour gets an extra free tour ride and a pass to go to the front of the lines for park rides.
| 192 | 13 | "Sucks for You" | August 29, 2019 | Murr | 0.48 |
The guys work as busboys at Katz's Delicatessen, then get strangers to agree with an unpopular opinion at a park. Punishment: Murr is forced to pose as a scientist named Dr. Dexter Scott and give a speech at a tech conference hosted by Sisense at Pier 60. He has to tell a personal story that is written for him about how technology ruined his life while his voice is altered by employing a microphone either connected to helium that will make his voice high-pitched or sulfur hexafluoride to deepen it, and he will be told which one to suck through as he speaks into the mic.
| 193 | 14 | "Well..." | September 12, 2019 | Sal | 0.54 |
The guys tag team up at a coffee shop and play "Pass the Message" at a supermarket. Punishment: In previous episodes, when the jokers want to perform a switch from a challenge to a punishment on a cast member, they normally say "well…". In this episode, they take it to a new level when they use it in Sal's punishment. For his punishment, Sal thinks that he is shooting a challenge with the guys, but instead he is continuously tortured psychologically by having him think that he has to do things that somehow, coincidentally appear next to the set of the challenge and things that happen to incorporate his worst fears whenever the guys say "well…". This continues on and on until Sal starts catching on to the fact that everything is actually a single punishment and the other guys affirm this.
| 194 | 15 | "The Prize Fighter" | September 19, 2019 | Murr | 0.36 |
The guys try to convince customers at a restaurant to pay unfair fees and then team up to give presentations on team building. Punishment: At Coney Island, Murr is forced to set up a ball-throwing game that normally is impossible to win, but it is rigged so that everyone is able to win the game. Murr must not give any winners their prizes. Whenever things get intense, Murr turns to the carnival manager—show producer Chase Dominick—who does not stand up for Murr and forces him to give the winners their prizes.
| 195 | 16 | "Sun-Fan Lotion" | September 26, 2019 | Joe | 0.36 |
The guys do and say whatever they're told while getting massages at a spa and then get strangers to approve awful high school yearbook dedications. Punishment: Originally, Joe in swim briefs has to ask strangers to apply sunscreen lotion all over his body on a nice sunny day at the park; however, the plans change when a fan recognizes Joe, in which Joe must ask the fan to apply sunscreen on him instead. The fan is deceived into the punishment: Joe makes the fan think that he is not filming Impractical Jokers in the park. Note: Following Joe Gatto's departure in December 2021, this episode has been banned from airing on television, along with seven other episodes involving Joe in a "compromising situation." It is not available for streaming on HBO Max or Hulu in the US.
| 196 | 17 | "Urine Trouble" | October 3, 2019 | Sal | 0.46 |
The guys, posing as receptionists, try not to laugh at a list of ridiculous names that they must call out, and then try to use inappropriate photos to convince a total stranger that they must divorce their wife. Punishment: Sal is forced to pretend to be stung in the leg by a jellyfish and must ask strangers at Coney Island beach to urinate on him. After no strangers volunteer to do so, the guys bring their backup plan—a barbershop quartet—where one of the members who is a friend of the jokers, Chris, agrees to do the job.
| 197 | 18 | "Irritable Vowel Syndrome" | October 10, 2019 | Q | 0.38 |
The guys try to get people to protect them from security at a grocery store by calling out strange phrases, and then try to get strangers to agree upon their inappropriate stories. Punishment: Q is forced to attend a health conference where he must find five strangers whose names begin with a vowel, one for each of the five vowels. Every time that he finds someone whose name does not start with a vowel, he must give the person an inappropriate insult prepared for him by the other guys.: The show includes an appearance from former gymnastics world champion David Jacobs.
| 198 | 19 | "Bad Carma" | October 17, 2019 | Q | 0.44 |
The guys propose inappropriate inventions to focus groups, and ask if people in Union Square need help with a reason given to them by the other guys. Punishment: Originally, Q has to post inappropriate notes on people's cars in a parking lot. After no one reacts badly to these notes, the guys change Q's punishment, ordering him to attempt to syphon gas from someone's truck. The punishment ends when Q asks the man he is trying to syphon gas from if he has heard of Impractical Jokers, the man responds with yes and realizes he is on the show.
| 199 | 20 | "Fast Feud" | October 24, 2019 | Sal | 0.39 |
The guys try to find people to house sit for them, and then try to follow people around for studying at a grocery store. Punishment: The guys return to White Castle where Sal is forced to become the head of the drive-thru. The other guys control the microphone and speaker, and say very insulting things to customers, making Sal take the fall for it. The guys eventually end the punishment after an insult backfires on them and a customer recognizes Sal from the show.
| 200 | 21 | "Toll Booth Corrector" | January 30, 2020 | Murr | 0.57 |
The guys pose as nutritionists conducting consultations with potential clients, ask shoppers at Fairway Market if they should quit, then get people to side with them while trying to fight off an angry mob of people in a park. Punishment: Murr has to be the exit gate attendee at a parking lot in New Jersey. Before he can open the gate to let cars leave, he has to complete a task that takes up a sizable and unnecessary amount of time, much to the demise of some customers with his only response to criticism being "hang tight". These tasks include blowing up a pool floatie with his mouth, completing a jigsaw puzzle, and shaving his legs.
| 201 | 22 | "The Paternity Test" | February 6, 2020 | Joe | 0.63 |
The guys play concierges at the Row NYC Hotel lobby doing and saying what they are told. Then they try to commit insurance fraud at a grocery store using strangers to support them as a "witness". Punishment: Joe is in a focus group about how parents treat their kids with said kids in the room with them with Joe's "child actor"—actually Joe's real daughter Milana playing along. When the focus group moderator (comedy producer John Szeluga) asks a question about how each parent treats their kid, Joe reads the rather awkward/bad answer given to him on the piece of paper.
| 202 | 23 | "Hollywood" | February 13, 2020 | Murr | 0.71 |
The guys arrive in Los Angeles to try directing, then do and say what they are told at Canter's Deli; the jokers get pedestrians to untangle their headphones before being pantsed by special guest stars Jason Mewes and Kevin Smith (Jay and Silent Bob), then they try to give away free movie tickets for made-up movies to strangers. Punishment: During a Steel Panther concert, Murr is forced to sit inside a kicking drum the whole way through. In the end, he is also showered in goo and confetti and the jokers reveal him to the concert-goers, actually all Impractical Jokers fans, to all of the fan's surprise along with the other three guys coming out and revealing it as a punishment.
| 203 | 24 | "The Shame of Water" | February 20, 2020 | Sal | 0.54 |
The guys read journal entries from their daughter's diaries in a park, then ask strangers if they should break up with their girlfriends for ridiculous reasons in a coffee shop. Punishment: Sal has to play the clumsy waiter at the Dallas BBQ where he must wear distorting "alcohol glasses" and try to serve water, then get spun around in a chair and try to serve food.
| 204 | 25 | "Rock Bottom" | February 27, 2020 | Joe | 0.50 |
The guys try to get strangers to take the blame for a fart with actor Jeff Daniels and get people to agree that they didn't overreact to weird arguments on their phones at a coffee shop. Punishment: At Manhattanville College, Joe is painted to completely blend into a stone wall, initially to scare passersby. But then he must give an orientation speech to a group of students. Note: Following Joe Gatto's departure in December 2021, this episode has been banned from airing on television, along with seven other episodes involving Joe in a "compromising situation." It is not available for streaming on HBO Max or Hulu in the US.
| 205 | 26 | "It's Electric" | March 5, 2020 | Murr | 0.54 |
The guys compete head-to-head pitching their TV show ideas to focus groups, then go to a park to defend unpopular opinions their daughter, played by Sal's two nieces, shares with strangers. Punishment: Murr is in a sauna full of some of the male crew members. They all do a choreographed version of the Electric Slide, but just as they all start to perform, they take off their towels to reveal that they are naked underneath. As Murr joins in, he is embarrassed by the "dongs" that are hanging out. Murr decides to take off his towel to reveal him wearing swim briefs. After they are finished dancing, one of the crew members uses Murr's blankie, which also appeared in the season four finale punishment, to wipe his own naked butt crack.

Punishment Count:

- Sal - 7 (including joint punishments) Total now: 68
- Joe - 5 (including joint punishments) Total now: 43
- Murr - 9 (including joint punishments) Total now: 63
- Q - 6 (including joint punishments) Total now: 51
