= Impractical Jokers season 7 =

Impractical Jokers
- Season 7
- No. of episodes: 26

Release
- Original network: truTV
- Original release: February 1 – December 6, 2018

Season chronology
- ← Previous; Season 6 Next → Season 8

This is a list of episodes from the seventh season of Impractical Jokers.

== Episodes ==
No. overall	No. in season	Title	Original air date	Losing Joker(s)	U.S. viewers (millions)
154	1	"The Marathon Man"	February 1, 2018	Murr	0.89
The guys go to Top of the Rock for some awkward interactions, and play a game of "Did They Deserve That?" at a bagel shop. Punishment: As revenge for the Gary Busey incident in the "Did They Deserve That?" challenge, Sal punishes Murr by forcing him to run across the Brooklyn Bridge wearing only shorts and huge shoes while it is below freezing outside, and he gets soaked with cups of cold water on the way by the show's crew members. When he finishes the run, he gets Gatorade showered with two coolers of cold water and then covered in some confetti.
155	2	"Guilty as Charged"	February 8, 2018	Q	0.65
The guys get strangers to watch their backs from angry security guards at a grocery store, and team up to teach presentations on UFOs. Punishment: Q is forced to work at the front door of the Knitting Factory in Brooklyn, collecting US$5 cover charges for Tight Fright. Later, he goes into the audience and an announcement is made that the show is free, so everyone goes after him for their money. Unfortunately for Q, all he can give them is a sack containing quarters.
156	3	"No Good Deed"	February 15, 2018	Joe and Sal	0.63
The guys compete head-to-head posing odd TV shows as execs to the public, and do and say whatever they're told at a department store. Punishment: At a fundraising event for the Algonquin Arts Theatre, Joe and Sal are forced to present to charity donors how they spent the money on ridiculous and insensitive projects.
157	4	"Stripteased"	March 1, 2018	Murr	0.68
The guys do and say whatever they are told while posing as dentists, and then compete head-to-head in trying not to laugh while the other makes a hilarious scene at a food court. Punishment: Before the punishment, Frank the prostate exam doctor from "Dark Side of the Moon" injects Murr with the histamine drug that he is mildly allergic to. The jokers watch Murr perform a striptease with Australia's Thunder from Down Under while dressed in denim shorts, a cowboy hat and boots.
158	5	"Indecent Proposal"	March 22, 2018	Sal	0.69
The guys attempt to trick unknowing receptionists with ridiculous disguises and try to get approval for an e-mail they are writing at a coffee shop. Punishment: Sal, acting as a dance teacher’s assistant, is forced to ask couples if they would be willing to meet him in a more passionate setting in exchange for money, similar to the film adaption of Indecent Proposal. Later on, he shows the couples a briefcase full of money he has.
159	6	"Turning the Tables"	March 29, 2018	Joe	0.66
The guys take out remote controlled wheelchairs for a spin at a mall, team up to work at a virtual reality gaming center, and attempt to blame strangers for unusual events at a park. Punishment: Eight breakaway tables are placed in a busy restaurant and Joe, posing as the manager, is forced to destroy them by jumping into them, without knowing which tables were real or fake. This is later revealed as Murr's revenge from "The Party Crasher" punishment.
160	7	"Lords of the Ring"	April 12, 2018	Sal and Q	0.65
The guys pose as receptionists at a law firm, then go fishing for people's bags at a mall. Punishment: Q and Sal are forced to sell a turquoise ring by rotary dial telephone while locked in a room that is becoming increasingly hot due to infrared heaters with only one gerbil water dispenser each to stay hydrated; the only phone book that they are provided dates back to the 1950s. After over four hours of unsuccessful attempts to sell the ring and the room temperature reaching above 125°F (52°C), Q manages to sell it to the owner of a pizza restaurant that he regularly visits.
161	8	"No Child Left Behind"	April 26, 2018	Q	0.55
The guys compete head-to-head selling their toys to focus groups and attaching clothespins to unsuspecting shoppers at a Fairway Market, and then play a game of touching laser pointer dots at Willowbrook Mall. Punishment: Q is forced to go into a kiddy's playground where the guys have put a toddler wearing a soiled diaper. Q must find the child amongst several other kids by sniffing their diapers for the soiled one. Right as he is about to be removed from the playing area by security, Q successfully finds the kid and the punishment ends.
162	9	"Pulling the Rug"	May 10, 2018	Murr	0.65
All four compete in a simultaneous hide-and-seek challenge; work at the counter of Carlo's Bake Shop (with a cameo appearance by the owner Buddy Valastro during Q's turn); ask strangers if they agree with the advice they give their children in a park. Punishment: As revenge for the punishment from the previous episode ("No Child Left Behind"), Q punishes Murr by making him work as a waiter in a crowded restaurant, Delmonico's, to find out who is wearing a wig. He successfully finds the wig and the punishment ends.
163	10	"Speech Impediment"	August 2, 2018	Murr	0.83
The guys conduct interviews while the others try to make them laugh from behind a two-way mirror and head to the Top of the Rock to get opinions on their wedding proposals. Punishment: Murr is forced to take a stab at performing a disastrous speech for the advisory board at Yonkers City Hall where he must read the blue cards every time the jokers say "line". Unaware that Yonkers mayor Mike Spano was already in on this punishment.
164	11	"Card Against Humanity"	August 9, 2018	Sal	0.76
The guys compete in a four-way job-exchanging challenge at an optometry office, and then record people's conversations for strange reasons in a park. Punishment: Sal is forced to attend a networking event where he poses as a businessman. He must give a single business card to the people at the event, but then take it back in favor of "a better person" determined by the other jokers.
165	12	"Bull Shiatsu"	August 16, 2018	Joe	0.59
The guys, posing as receptionists, try not to laugh saying ridiculous names given to them on a list from the other guys, and then compete to give away odd items to strangers on the street as a reward for returning their "lost" wallet. Punishment: Joe, disguised as a robotic massage chair, is forced to manually massage people who sit on him at the Woodbridge Center mall. The punishment does not end until he massages his former adversary Byamba from his "Pseudo-Sumo" punishment. Note: Following Joe Gatto's departure in December 2021, this episode has been banned from airing on television, along with seven other episodes involving Joe in a "compromising situation." It is not available for streaming on HBO Max in the US.
166	13	"The Running Of The Bullies"	August 23, 2018	Sal	0.75
The guys, posing as waiters, offer ridiculous specials to customers at Delmonico's, and team up at a housekeeping job, doing and saying whatever the other guys tell them. Punishment: Sal is forced to pose as a lifeguard at the Cresskill Swim Club in Cresskill, New Jersey where he must kick everybody out of the pool without reasoning, on the grounds of a new bullying policy.
167	14	"The Needy and the Greedy"	August 30, 2018	Q	0.76
The guys participate in note-taking focus groups on a computer that is controlled by the other guys and try to commit insurance fraud at a grocery store by using strangers to support them as a "witness". Punishment: Q is forced to pose as a volunteer at Long Island Cares food bank, where he must eat donated food items in front of other volunteers who are sorting the food. Murr later revealed that the punishment was inspired by Joe's segment in a challenge from "Catastrophe". In that episode, Joe was told to continuously drink the juice bar's supply of coconut milk, regardless of what his trainer says while working as a trainee at Organic Avenue.
168	15	"Washed Up"	September 13, 2018	Joe	0.64
The guys make scenes while stealing tips from the tip jar at a pizza restaurant, and then go through a hilarious text exchange challenge at a mall food court. Punishment: Joe is forced to wash other people's cars in a parking lot without their permission. The other guys up the ante midway into the punishment and have Joe strip off his clothes, leaving only a bikini, while washing the cars. The punishment does not end until he entirely washes someone's car and vacuums their interior.
169	16	"To Hatch A Predator"	September 20, 2018	Q	0.51
The guys perform DNA testing and then cause mischief at the grocery store while wearing slippers and only a bathrobe over their underwear. Punishment: At the Staten Island Children's Museum, Q is forced to take store-bought chicken eggs and break them over his head in an attempt to achieve a supposed world record. After he smashes the chicken eggs on his head, Q realizes that the children in the audience were told that he is a scientist and those eggs are turtle eggs that are going to hatch that day. He must give a presentation on turtles while the children berate him.
170	17	"Like A Boss"	September 27, 2018	Murr	0.54
The guys do and say whatever they are told while working at the Universal Orlando location of Fast & Furious: Supercharged, where every single refusal counts as a thumbs down. Later, they head to the park taking photos of strangers and asking permission to post them on the guys' personal Instagram account. The catch is the other guys provide an awkward caption that has to go along with the photo, and if you lose you not only get a thumbs down, but you also have to post an embarrassing selfie using that same caption. Punishment: Murr is forced to pose as a new hire at tumblr and continually interrupt a presentation that was held at the company's headquarters including a FaceTime chat with Guy Fieri. It was revealed that Joe contacted Fieri prior to the punishment and told him about the tumblr employees being a fan of his.
171	18	"Chick Magnet"	October 4, 2018	Sal	0.65
The guys try to get strangers to follow them to a made up basement at a meatball shop, try to get customers to call out a ridiculous nickname of someone at a grocery store, and then try to get a stranger to agree with their ridiculous life lessons they bestow upon some toddlers at a park. Punishment: Sal, being fearful of animals, is forced to catch a bunch of wild chickens and chicks in an office room with his father witnessing the punishment.
172	19	"Dropping Knowledge"	October 11, 2018	Murr	0.52
The guys get strangers to help them fix their broken bike in a park, and do and say whatever they are told. Later, they get strangers to approve some strange e-mails written by the other guys. Punishment: Murr is forced to compete in a little trivia game show against a kid, Jake, based on Are You Smarter than a 5th Grader?. Every time Jake correctly answers a question that Murr answers incorrectly, he gets to choose an item from Murr's apartment for himself to keep, and the game is over when Murr beats Jake three times. The punishment is that Murr's apartment is a rental, and, unlike past punishments, Murr does not get reimbursed for any of the items that Jake wins, including the shower head, the front door handle, all of the bedding, and his Georgetown diploma.
173	20	"Hump Day"	October 18, 2018	Q	0.48
The guys work at a Greek restaurant and then compete head-to-head answering questions in a focus group. Punishment: Q is forced to spend a single day locked in a den at the White Post Farms zoo where he experiences life inside a zoo, with his only companion being a baby camel. He is told he cannot leave until the other guys unlock the gate to the den. Q is forced to do things animals do in the zoo such as cooling off in a swimming pool, being showered by a zookeeper, and lying on a pile of hay as his bed. He eventually calls Joe when the day is over, only to realize that the gate had never been locked by the other guys the entire time he was there.
174	21	"Out of Left Field"	October 25, 2018	Joe	0.45
The guys play "Laugh Man Standing" challenge, and then try to get strangers to repeat the strange backstory of the Gatto dogs. Punishment: Joe, being the most out of shape between the quartet, gets humiliated at MLB Network studios when he poses as a TV producer and is forced to interrupt the televised performances of Carlos Peña and Mark DeRosa by doing 100 push-ups with Sal's father as his coach. Eventually, an annoyed Peña and DeRosa join in to help Joe complete 100 push-ups just to get him to leave.
175	22	"Autograph Corrector"	November 1, 2018	Q	0.50
The guys ask strangers to fill out some questionnaires with injured hands in a waiting room and fall in love with complete strangers who assist them in the park. Punishment: Q is forced to go to an autograph session with Tino Martinez at Billy's Sports Bar in the Bronx, where he poses as a bar employee and must purposely ruin autographed pictures of Martinez or delete photos on phones. Unbeknownst to Q, for every item he destroys/deletes, they give the fans a brand new autograph or photo.
176	23	"The Bogey Man"	November 8, 2018	Sal	0.54
The guys pose as dental assistants doing and saying whatever the other guys tell them, make headlines for all the wrong reasons, and give campers some ridiculous campfire tips. Punishment: Sal is forced to go to a golf course where he must ruin the games of golf players by intentionally moving their balls. He joins someone's golf game and even makes a 10-15 foot putt to end the punishment.
177	24	"Hell On Wheels"	November 15, 2018	Murr	0.56
The guys do and say whatever they are told while posing as physical therapists, then compete head-to-head pitching some ridiculous ideas for TV show hosts. Punishment: Murr is forced to take out some female roller derby professionals and for every lap that he does not take someone out, the guys send a humiliating email to a contact on his Gmail account that he cannot apologize for. The punishment does not end until he takes out one player.
178	25	"Pantsing With the Stars"	November 29, 2018	Sal	0.50
The guys pair up to share ridiculous educational improvement ideas in presentations with perplexed parents, they go head-to-head putting pins on unsuspecting grocery store shoppers, and then they teach Krav Maga to martial arts students. Punishment: Sal takes a loss on the final challenge (in which he has to pants someone) without realizing that this means he loses the whole episode: for his punishment, he must pants a 3-time heavyweight champion, Randy Couture, who easily ties him down every time he tries. The punishment does not end until Sal successfully takes Couture's pants off.
179	26	"Staten Island Holiday Spectacular"	December 6, 2018	Sal	0.57
In this hour-long season finale with pre-recorded challenges in front of an audience, the guys celebrate with some unseasonable specials, followed by unwanted new toys; then, gift wrapping goes awry. Punishment: The guys trap Sal in a cage at a bear reservation where he is forced to face the wrath of grizzly bears as he feeds them some fried chicken.

Punishment Count:

- Sal - 9 (including joint punishments) Total now: 61
- Joe - 5 (including joint punishments) Total now: 38
- Murr - 7 (including joint punishments) Total now: 54
- Q - 7 (including joint punishments) Total now: 45
