= Any.do =

Productivity platform

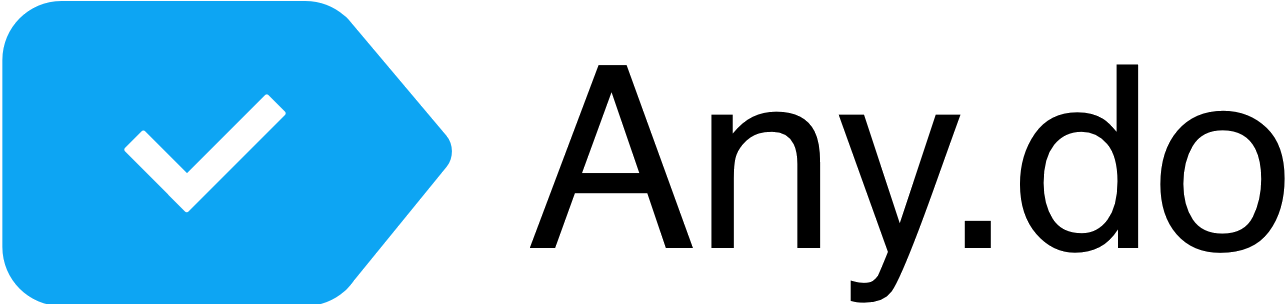
- Operating system: Android iOS; Google Chrome App; Web browser Mac Alexa Chrome app Apple Watch Wear OS Windows Gmail
- Type: Productivity; Task management Calendar; Project Management; Assistant; Grocery list Reminders; Personal Assistant
- License: Freemium
- Website: www.any.do

Any.do is a productivity platform for task management and project management. It is available on mobile, web, and wearables with built-in integrations including calendars, chat applications, and virtual assistants.

== History ==
Any.do was co-founded by Omer Perchik, Yoni Lindenfeld, and Itay Kahana. Its HQ is located in Tel Aviv, Israel.

Any.do originally launched on Android in November 2011 and within 30 days, reached over 500,000 downloads and 40 million users by 2022.

In 2016 Any.do added a built-in calendar, a freemium subscription model Any.do Premium and AI Assistant software that offers to complete some tasks on demand.

In 2023, Any.do launched its team collaboration tier for teams named Any.do Workspace.

In 2024, Any.do launched its offering for families tier named Any.do for Families.

Prior to Any.do, the company launched a simpler task list app on Android called Taskos as a proof of concept.

== Design ==
On October 9, 2013, The Verge reported Any.do to be of the inspirations behind Jony Ive's iOS 7 redesign, and others noted its similarities to the revamped Apple operating system.

== Funding ==
Any.do announced $1 million in angel funding in November 2011.

By May 2013 the company had raised $3.5 million from Genesis Partners, Eric Schmidt’s Innovation Endeavors, Blumberg Capital, Joe Lonsdale of Palantir Technologies, Brian Koo of Formation 8, Joe Greenstein of Flixster, and Felicis Ventures. The company raised additional funding from investors including Jerry Yang of AME Cloud Ventures and Steve Chen of YouTube, among others, by October of that same year.

== See also ==
- Task management
- Project management software
- Calendaring software
- Time management
