= Sisense =

Business software company

Sisense Inc.
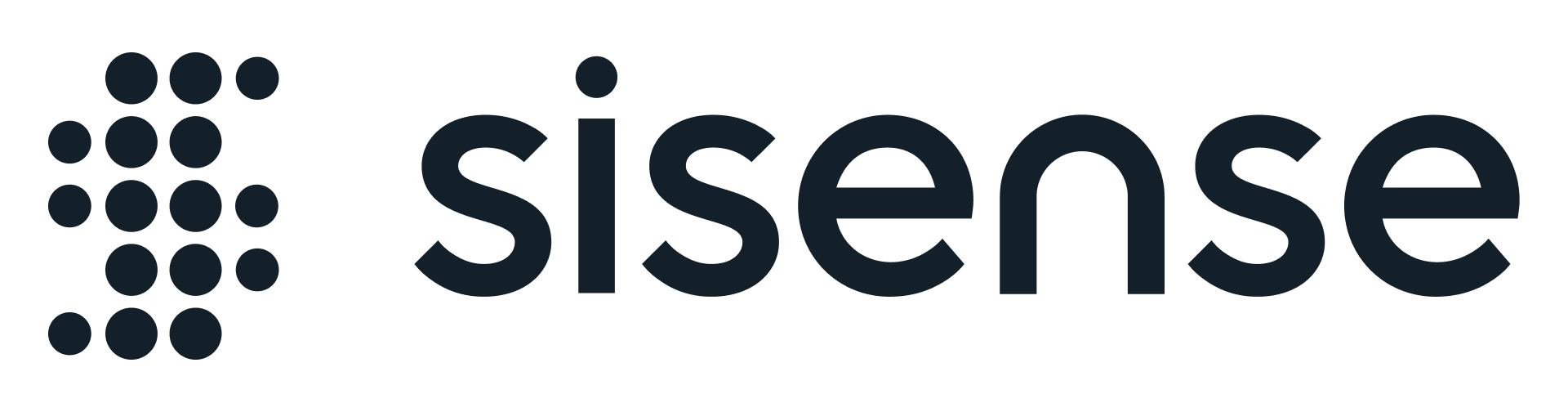
- Company type: Private
- Industry: Software
- Founded: 2004
- Founders: Elad Israeli; Eldad Farkash; Aviad Harell; Guy Boyangu; Adi Azaria
- Headquarters: New York City, United States
- Number of locations: 8
- Key people: Ariel Katz, CEO
- Products: Business intelligence tools Data visualization tools Analytics tools Big data tools
- Revenue: ▲$100 million
- Number of employees: Over 800
- Website: www.sisense.com

Sisense is an American business intelligence software company headquartered in New York City, United States. It also has offices in San Francisco, Scottsdale and in other locations.

== History ==
Sisense was founded in 2004 in Tel Aviv, Israel, as a provider of business intelligence tools for small to midsize businesses. The company initially focused on research and development and did not formally publicize its products until 2010. Initial investors included venture capital firms Genesis Partners and Opus Capital and private investor Eli Farkash.

By 2012, Sisense raised $10 million and expanded its operations to the United States. That same year, Amit Bendov was appointed as the company's new CEO. Series B and C financing followed in 2013 and 2014, respectively, at which point Sisense had raised $44 million. TechCrunch noted that Sisense's growth and funding during this period reflected the degree to which it made big data analytics accessible to ordinary business users. By 2014, the company had opened an office in New York and about 70 percent of its sales were in the U.S.

In 2015, Amir Orad was appointed CEO, replacing Bendov. Orad previously served as CEO of NICE Actimize. Series C and D funding followed in 2016 and 2018 respectively, bringing Sisense’s total funding to $174M over five rounds.

In May 2019, Sisense acquired Periscope Data, a U.S. based company specializing in advanced analytics and predictive modeling. The combined company represented more than $100 million in annual recurring revenue, over 2,000 customers, and more than 700 employees. With another round of funding in January 2020, Sisense reached a valuation exceeding $1 billion, often referred to as unicorn status.

In 2022, Sisense began a series of massive layoffs, firing half of the company.

In April 2023, Ariel Katz was appointed CEO, replacing Orad. Katz previously served as Sisense’s Chief Products and Technology Officer (CPTO) and General Manager of Israel.

== Technology ==
The company develops business intelligence software that allows users to access and analyze big data.

The company's analytics suite, Sisense Fusion, uses artificial intelligence and machine learning to analyze data. The platform allows users to customize their analytics dashboards and data visualization by industry and by a user's role within a business. The software can also alert users to anomalous results.

In 2019, the company acquired data science software company Periscope Data, and renamed its software Sisense for Cloud Data Teams.

As of 2021, the software platform integrates with platforms such as Adobe Analytics, AWS, Microsoft Azure Synapse Analytics, and Snowflake to provide users with the data input for analysis.

== See also ==
- Science and technology in Israel
