= Impractical Jokers season 9 =

Impractical Jokers
- Season 9
- No. of episodes: 26

Release
- Original network: truTV
- Original release: February 4, 2021 – August 4, 2022

Season chronology
- ← Previous; Season 8 Next → Season 10

The ninth season of Impractical Jokers premiered on February 4, 2021. Part of the season was filmed before the COVID-19 pandemic suspended operations in March 2020. Filming and production resumed in September and continued as late as December. The aftershow After Party season 4 was postponed, and debuted with "Space Oddity" on April 15, 2021. Following "The Prince and Me" episode, the season resumed on July 8, where cast member Sal Vulcano would be referred to as Prince Herb for the remaining episodes of the season; however, he dropped the moniker in the "Eric André" episode that aired on April 2, 2022. This was the last season to feature Joe Gatto prior to his departure from the show at the beginning of 2022 after 17 episodes into the season. The season's remaining episodes aired starting from June 16, 2022 with various celebrity guest stars that participate in the losing Joker's punishment.

== Episodes ==
No. overall	No. in season	Title	Original air date	Losing Joker(s)	U.S. viewers (millions)
206	1	"You Dirty Dog"	February 4, 2021	Joe	0.60
The Jokers work as audio engineers at Sound on Sound Studios with strangers and a mic controlled by the other guys. They shop at a Morton Williams supermarket with their fake wives, doing what the other guys tell them. Jameela Jamil from their show The Misery Index guest stars as Q's wife. Punishment: Joe informs customers at a dog daycare center that his dog had sex with their dog.: This is the only time Joe is punished in a season premiere.
207	2	"The Bachelor Party"	February 11, 2021	Murr	0.47
The Jokers act as photographers for an outdoor shoot with a model, (Note: The outdoor shoot was at Snug Harbor in Staten Island) but must say and do what the other Jokers tell them and propose inappropriate cartoons to focus groups. Punishment: A urologist (known simply as Dr. K) inserts a catheter into Murr's penis. The Jokers then have Murr go on a zipline while using the catheter. Murr's fiancée (Note: Murray's wedding was in September 2020.) Melyssa then arrives to remove the catheter, and Dr. Frank Contacessa (who first appeared in "Dark Side of the Moon") returns to give him another prostate exam.
208	3	"Drive, Drive, Drive"	February 18, 2021	Q	0.47
The Jokers act as waiting room receptionist and team up to give presentations on partying.(One joker is giving the presentation and the other is posing as an audience member trying to help the presenter out). Punishment: The guys hijack Q's day off by having him drive all over the New York City metro area to pick up and deliver food to each of them, taking advantage of the fact that they now all live far apart from each other. While Q does this, he must drive a car in which animatronic puppets have been installed in the passenger and back seats; they sway back and forth singing the same 16-second song on repeat. After over 11 hours on the road, the punishment finally ends when a frazzled Q delivers food to Murr.
209	4	"Poetry Slammed"	February 25, 2021	Sal	0.52
The guys try not to laugh during a fake documentary alongside strangers at DeKalb Market Hall. They play a round of "Did I Overreact?" in a waiting room. Punishment: Sal has to attend a Gotham Writers poetry slam event where he has to harshly criticize (using the other Jokers' comments) each of the attendees' poems, and at the end, present a poem himself written by the other Jokers.
210	5	"Bleach for America"	March 4, 2021	Murr	0.57
The Jokers act as receptionists trying not to laugh at gag names written by the other guys and team up to give presentations on homeschooling. Punishment: Murr becomes a national spokesperson for the Shiney Hiney anal bleaching kit, a product that he was seen using in a season 4 episode. The other Jokers show him all the promotional campaigns including his picture on the product, direct mail coupons, a print ad in Page Six of the New York Post, a roadway billboard in New Jersey, and Instagram video ad.
211	6	"Smashing Success"	March 11, 2021	Sal	0.56
The Jokers attempt to hire candidates for a security job despite some strange facilities. They then act as an artist-in-residence doing and saying what they are told in front of volunteers who are assembling and painting their furniture. Punishment: Sal loses the artist challenge and, as an impromptu punishment, he is forced to destroy the furniture that his volunteers have been working on.
212	7	"Pity in Pink"	March 25, 2021	Murr	0.48
The Jokers try to get strangers to hand over a $20 Bill for bizarre reasons at D'Agostino Market and compete head to head presenting subscription services to panelists. Punishment: Murr finds that his entire front yard grass has been dyed pink and he has two hours to clean it up using a push mower before Homes & Gardens magazine arrives for a photo shoot. The Jokers also bring in folks dressed up as pink moles. The photographer eventually arrives, but it is actually their friend Rob Emmer who takes a Polaroid shot.
213	8	"Space Oddity"	April 15, 2021	Murr	0.48
The Jokers go head-to-head in a tournament in taste testing focus groups and try to get food hall patrons approval on weird apology notes written by the other guys.(Murr is tricked into reading his note and forced the others to do the same). Punishment: Murr pretends to be an astronaut aboard the International Space Station on a Zoom call with some elementary school students. But to simulate the zero gravity, he is hooked onto a contraption that rotates him upside down, and he has to try various activities.: Joe was absent for the second challenge
214	9	"OK Zoomer"	April 22, 2021	Joe	0.54
The Jokers pose as job references on a Zoom call while being messaged with what to say and messed with by the other guys and in a Joker vs. Joker challenge, the guys pitch memoirs to try to get a high rating. Punishment: Joe must get up in the middle of the night to stream a video where he gives the traffic conditions and odd news for a morning show in Australia. He must also eat a (vegan) meat pie and play the didgeridoo. He must do it for four nights in a row. (Note: Joe's punishment was dated from February 9–12, 2021)
215	10	"The Prince and Me"	April 29, 2021	Prince Herb (Sal)	0.34
The Jokers try not to laugh as past life therapists. Then they must get approval from a stranger to send a goofy email. Punishment: At Times Square, the Jokers announce that Sal is going to be renamed Prince Herb for the rest of the season. He then gets both his ears pierced and outfitted with cubic zirconia earrings. (Note: News of renaming Sal to Prince Herb started in February 2021 on the news media and related talk shows.) This is the second time a punishment is applied for the remainder of a season; the first was in season 6 when Murr wore Q's hair as a wig per the episode "The Q-Pay".
216	11	"Breaking Wind Beneath My Wings"	July 8, 2021	Joe	0.41
The Jokers go head to head pitching whimsical TV show ideas to panelists and compete in a tournament trying to enroll the most participants into their focus groups. Punishment: As part of a charity event, the jokers take advantage of Joe's terrible singing voice by making him serenade a thousand online viewers with his rendition of the power ballad "Wind Beneath My Wings".
217	12	"Prince + Charming"	July 15, 2021	Murr	TBA
The Jokers must persuade a temp worker to pretend to be their senior vice president for a meeting with some Japanese investors, and get the hire to agree to join them for dinner and try to get a good rating for their online dating profiles. Punishment: Murr admits to not fulfilling his promise to learn how to play the flute after Joe bought him one while filming at a music store in "Sorry for Your Loss" on April 30, 2013. Murr is forced to dress up as Indiana Jones and play the snake charmer song on the flute in order to be allowed to leave a pit that becomes occupied by snakes.
218	13	"I’m Having The Best Time"	July 22, 2021	Murr	0.46
The Jokers pose as actors working with other actors in a television commercial for Topgolf at a golf driving range and the others that didn't compete in the previous episode last time, pitch their memoirs to strangers. Punishment: Murr participates in a technology expert panel but the other Jokers control what Murr can or cannot hear by pumping static noise into his headphones, and feed him what to say. They then enable him to hear and he has to defend his contextually inappropriate answers.
219	14	"Documentary No!"	July 29, 2021	Q and Prince Herb (Sal)	TBA
The Jokers act as ridiculous made-up characters in a fake documentary with interviewers and try to read three entries of their daughters' diaries to strangers. Punishment: Q and Prince Herb act as motivational speakers presenting in front of a small audience but they take a break every so often to try to pump each other up but the antics are shown to and heard by that audience via a two-way mirror and their microphones/speakers.
220	15	"Food, Air, Toilet"	August 5, 2021	Prince Herb (Sal)	TBA
The Jokers pitch their inventions to a worker to see if it is ready to present to their boss and share more online dating profiles to get a good rating. Punishment: Prince Herb attends an audition for a TV show but must say and do what the others tell him with regard to the cold reading of the scripts.
221	16	"A Tasteful Episode"	August 12, 2021	Joe	0.43
The Jokers go head-to-head in another tournament for taste testing focus groups and team up to give presentations on life hacks. Punishment: Joe gives a presentation to some educators about women's bodies while he is wearing a Slim Goodbody-type of anatomical costume.
222	17	"Moist Richard"	August 19, 2021	Q	0.42
Two challenges featured the jokers persuading a focus group participant to sign off on different contract items that were written by the other guys, and must get a stranger to listen to their reading their daughter's diary entries. Punishment: Q gets a person to join him to do a podcast with content created by the other Jokers. However, after an hour of doing this podcast, Q finds out what his real punishment was, which was that all of his clothes were taken out of his house and donated to charity.: This was the last episode before Joe Gatto left the show.
223	18	"Eric André"	April 2, 2022	Sal	0.21 (Note: Impractical Jokers showed up 3 times on the Saturday cable ratings for TruTV only. The original broadcast at 4pm was given a 0.144, the 11:30pm rerun was given a .211, and the 1:30am rerun was given a 0.177.)
The Jokers work with a person as rat exterminators and must do what he is told at the New York Hall of Science and pose as producers getting a spokesperson to remember the most details of a product during a live product review. Punishment: With lines fed by Eric and the others, Sal surprises a series of individuals by telling them that they are on a prank show called Dumb F**ks, and then must get them to sign a release. The third person is a woman who starts crying and being noticeably upset, but she is actually an actress who is in on the prank.: This episode was broadcast on truTV, TNT, and TBS following the coverage for the NCAA Men's Final Four basketball games.; Sal no longer has to be Prince Herb as of this episode.; This is the first episode since Joe Gatto's departure from the show.
224	19	"Jillian Bell"	June 16, 2022	Sal	0.17
The Jokers pretend to be an arrogant boss for a new hire, and tell them that they are fired, but then another staff member tells them that it's the other way around and that the new hire can fire him. Then the Jokers are in a waiting room where the staff tells them of some minor inconvenience and they must throw up and then try to rally the other folks to join him in leaving. The Jokers blame Sal for the second bit not working. Punishment: Sal must agree with what Jillian says and thinks of him as they participate in a couples panel along with the show's crew members. Jillian reveals that Sal has small testicles. Dr. Frank (who first appeared in "Dark Side of the Moon") makes an appearance to give his opinion of Sal's balls.
225	20	"Colin Jost"	June 23, 2022	Q	0.28
The Jokers act as obnoxious jerk customers at an ice cream shop, so that when the server drops the ice cream on the floor and hands it to them, the other customer will not even warn them. Then the Jokers must give a presentation about relationships that is written by the other guys. Q is paired with Impractical Jokers: The Movie director Chris Henchy, and Chris's wife Brooke Shields makes a video cameo. Punishment: At the Liberty Science Center, Q competes in a spelling bee against Riley while wearing a large tuxedo selected by the Jokers and Colin which is also a bite suit for attack dogs. A dog is sent to attack him for every word he incorrectly spells until he correctly spells it.
226	21	"Rob Riggle"	June 30, 2022	Murr	0.38
The Jokers try to get their volunteers to sample beverages after explaining their bizarre side effects. Then they must do and say what they are told while working out with a personal trainer (played by comedy producer Mike Finoia) and another person. Punishment: There is a bizarre murder at Westbury Manor with Murr playing a dead half-naked man in a thong as Rob and the murder mystery game participants try to figure who done it. Dr. Frank (who first appeared in "Dark Side of the Moon") comes in to pretend to give the dead body a prostate exam where he discovered a scroll with the message revealing that Murr was poisoned and why he took off all his clothes. In the end, Rob turned out to be the killer and then he gives the dead body a wedgie.
227	22	"Chris Jericho"	July 7, 2022	Q	0.33
The Jokers pose as stars for a commercial with other actors, doing and saying what the others tell them to and compete head to head answering questions in focus groups.(Murr is paired against their comedian friend "Jiggy). Punishment: Murr, Sal and Chris have Q sit in an ice bath tub while giving Sal's mother directions on how to do each task. For every attempt at leaving the tub, he has to endure more consequences. But the only time he can actually leave is after Sal's mom finishes all three tasks.
228	23	"Adam Pally & Jon Gabrus"	July 14, 2022	Sal	0.29
The Jokers try to find people to babysit for them and enlist the most participants into joining their focus groups. Punishment: Sal gives a tour at the Staten Island Museum while being administered electrical shocks to parts of his body by Adam, Jon and the other Jokers.
229	24	"David Cross"	July 21, 2022	Murr	0.20
The jokers must do and say what they are told to while working with someone to empty out stuff from a garage. Then they must give presentations about paranormal activity and get the most hands raised for their respective presentations. Punishment: Murr participates in an extreme method acting class hosted by David. He has to act out a bunch of scenes with some weird condition such as putting a spoonful of cinnamon powder in his mouth, or eating a ghost pepper.
230	25	"Method Man"	July 28, 2022	Murr	0.27
The jokers must do and say what they are told as they work with a volunteer on a bunch of kooky science experiments at the Liberty Science Center. Then they try not to laugh or even smirk when their own comical answers for a survey are read by a volunteer. Punishment: Murr attends a panel hosted by Method Man, but has to wear a device that delivers strong vibrations to the inside of his butt.
231	26	"Brooke Shields"	August 4, 2022	Sal	0.27
Q & Sal and Murr & Brooke present their children's fashions outfits to a panel of critics, but the designs are done by the other group. Neither of the two groups got any hands of approval raised, resulting in the next challenge to determine the episode's loser as the Jokers participate in a Dating Game-styled show hosted by Brooke where they must avoid getting picked by the bachelorette by coming up with the worst answers that will get themselves eliminated. Punishment: During the dating show's break, Sal is forced to reject the bachelorette. Brooke gets offended and then when the show resumes, she launches a barrage of insults at Sal and tells him to leave the stage.

Punishment Count:

- Sal - 9 (including joint punishments) Total now: 77
- Joe - 4 (including joint punishments) Total now: 47 (left show after episode 17)
- Murr - 9 (including joint punishments) Total now: 72
- Q - 5 (including joint punishments) Total now: 56
