= Mitch Metcalf =

American TV executive, analyst (born c. 1966)

Mitch Metcalf (born c. 1966) is an American television analyst and former scheduling executive for NBC.

== Early life ==
Metcalf studied politics and economics at Princeton University. He worked for Frank N. Magid Associates and Research Communications before joining ABC in 1990. The network promoted him to director of West Coast research in January 1995, and later senior vice president of research. NBC hired Metcalf in September 1999 as senior vice president of program research on the West Coast. He became program planning and scheduling chief in November 2000.

== Later career ==
Metcalf was promoted to executive vice president of programming planning and scheduling in 2005. He left the company in March 2011 after Robert Greenblatt became NBC chairman. Later that year, together with Mitch Salem, he cofounded the website Showbuzz Daily, dedicated to box office and television ratings analysis. The website briefly went defunct on June 7, 2021 due to "technical issues" and losing access to Nielsen ratings after May 13. On August 16, 2021, Metcalf reported that the site was back up and running and would be able to post ratings again, with some few changes. On June 27, 2023, Salem announced that the site would close, due to an inability to continue receiving data and TV viewership ratings becoming increasingly irrelevant.

Following the closure of Showbuzz Daily, Metcalf founded Metcalf Entertainment Intelligence, providing insights and analysis regarding the TV industry, including its streaming portfolio.
