= Homeis =

Social networking app

Homeis was the first social networking app for immigrants. The app networks foreign-born peoples based on location and language, primarily focusing on South Asian, South American, French-speaking African, and Israeli immigrants.

Homeis connects users with paid Homeis staff or volunteers in their area who speak the same language and can offer assistance with their transition to living in the US, Canada, Europe, and the United Arab Emirates (UAE). Users can also interact based on shared interests.

Homeis was co-founded by Ran Harnevo and Hanan Laschover in January 2017. Harnevo previously created 5Min Media, an online video distributor created in 2007 that was purchased by AOL in 2010. He acted as president of video at Oath, owned by AOL, until 2015. Laschover was the head of AOL Israel until he left in 2015.

The inspiration for Homeis came from Harnevo’s own experience of struggling to make his way around New York City after immigrating to the United States from Tel Aviv, Israel in 2008 to build 5Min Media. Harnevo and Laschover initially focused the app on Israeli immigrants in New York City before broadening to include French-speaking African, Indian, and South American communities.

The Homeis app shut down in Summer 2021 with the promise of re-opening in Fall 2021. However, it remains offline, as of February 2026.
