= Simply (software company) =

Privately held company

Simply Ltd
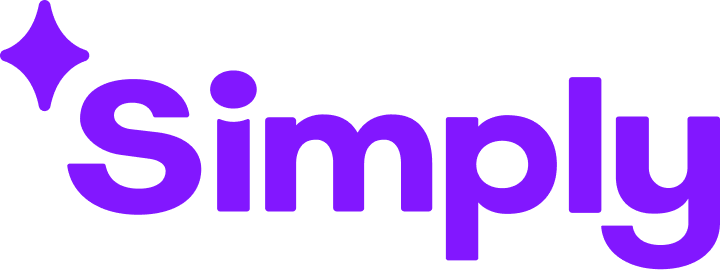
- Industry: Creative Hobbies; EdTech; Music; Art
- Founded: 2017
- Founders: Yuval Kaminka, Yigal Kaminka, Roey Izkovsky
- Headquarters: Tel Aviv, Israel
- Key people: Yuval Kaminka, (CEO); Yigal Kaminka, (Musical Director)
- Products: Simply Piano; Simply Guitar; Simply Sing; Simply Tune; Simply Draw
- Website: https://www.hellosimply.com/

Simply (formerly JoyTunes) is a privately held company that develops mobile applications for learning music and drawing. Its apps include Simply Piano, Simply Guitar, Simply Tune, Simply Sing, and Simply Draw. In July 2022, JoyTunes rebranded as Simply.

Simply initially focused on music education, developing piano learning apps alongside a patented note-recognition engine called MusicSense. The technology powers several of the company's music apps and supports acoustic instruments.

== Apps ==
=== Simply Piano ===
Simply Piano launched in 2017 and is a subscription-based mobile application for iOS and Android designed to teach piano. In 2024, Simply announced a partnership with Trinity College London, allowing users who complete certain courses to be eligible for a TCL certificate.

On October 30, 2026, Simply Piano was featured in “Different Ways to Learn,” an episode of The Balancing Act, Lifetime’s weekday morning program hosted by Mario and Courtney Lopez. The segment discussed Simply Piano’s child-led approach to music education and featured Tessa, who began learning with the app at age eight and, by age 14, was performing regularly and had also learned guitar and other instruments.

=== Simply Piano XR ===
In December 2024, Simply released Simply Piano for Apple Vision Pro, which includes a virtual keyboard allowing users to play without a physical instrument. The Simply Piano logo appeared during Apple's Vision Pro presentation at WWDC 2023. In 2025, Simply released Simply Piano for Android XR.

=== Simply Guitar ===
Simply Guitar is a subscription-based mobile application (iOS and Android) designed to teach guitar through personalized lessons. The app includes real-time AI-feedback, video lessons, and a library of songs across playing levels.

=== Simply Draw ===
Simply Draw launched in 2023 and is a subscription-based mobile application (iOS and Android) that teaches users to draw with pencil on paper. Created by professional artists and powered by AI, Simply Draw offers step-by-step video tutorials, real-time visual AI-feedback on actual drawings, and an AI-driven personalized learning path based on each learner's goals and progress. Available across skill levels and ages, it also includes a dedicated path for younger children.

=== Simply Tune ===
Simply Tune is a free guitar tuning application developed by Simply Ltd, available on iOS and Android, supporting guitar, bass, and ukulele via automatic and manual tuning modes.

=== Simply Sing ===
Simply Sing is a subscription-based mobile application (iOS and Android) that uses AI to help users develop their singing voice. The app listens in real time, providing personalized AI-feedback on pitch, tone, and key, and adapts to each user's level.

== Funding and investors ==
Simply has raised a total of $97 million in venture capital funding to date. Early funding rounds included:

- $7M from angel investors and seed VCs in 2017.
- Angel investors included Dana Messina (former CEO of Steinway Musical Instruments)
- $5 million Series A in August 2014, led by Aleph VC with participation from Formation 8 and Genesis Partners

In 2019, Simply announced that it raised $25 million in a round led by Tel Aviv-based venture capital firm Qumra Capital. In 2021 Simply raised $50 million from Google Ventures (GV), Qualcomm Ventures and Hearst Ventures. The company has raised $97 million to date.

== Social impact ==
In April 2024, Simply launched the Sheba Music Therapy Room named Harmony at the Sheba Medical Center's rehabilitation hospital. Since its launch, the music room has been integrated into the hospital's therapeutic offering. It operates five days a week and offers rehabilitation patients lessons in piano, guitar and drums, as well as a full recording studio, music therapy and group sessions with professional music therapists and teachers from the Jerusalem Academy of Music and Dance..
