= Kosher slaughterer =

Butcher following Jewish tradition

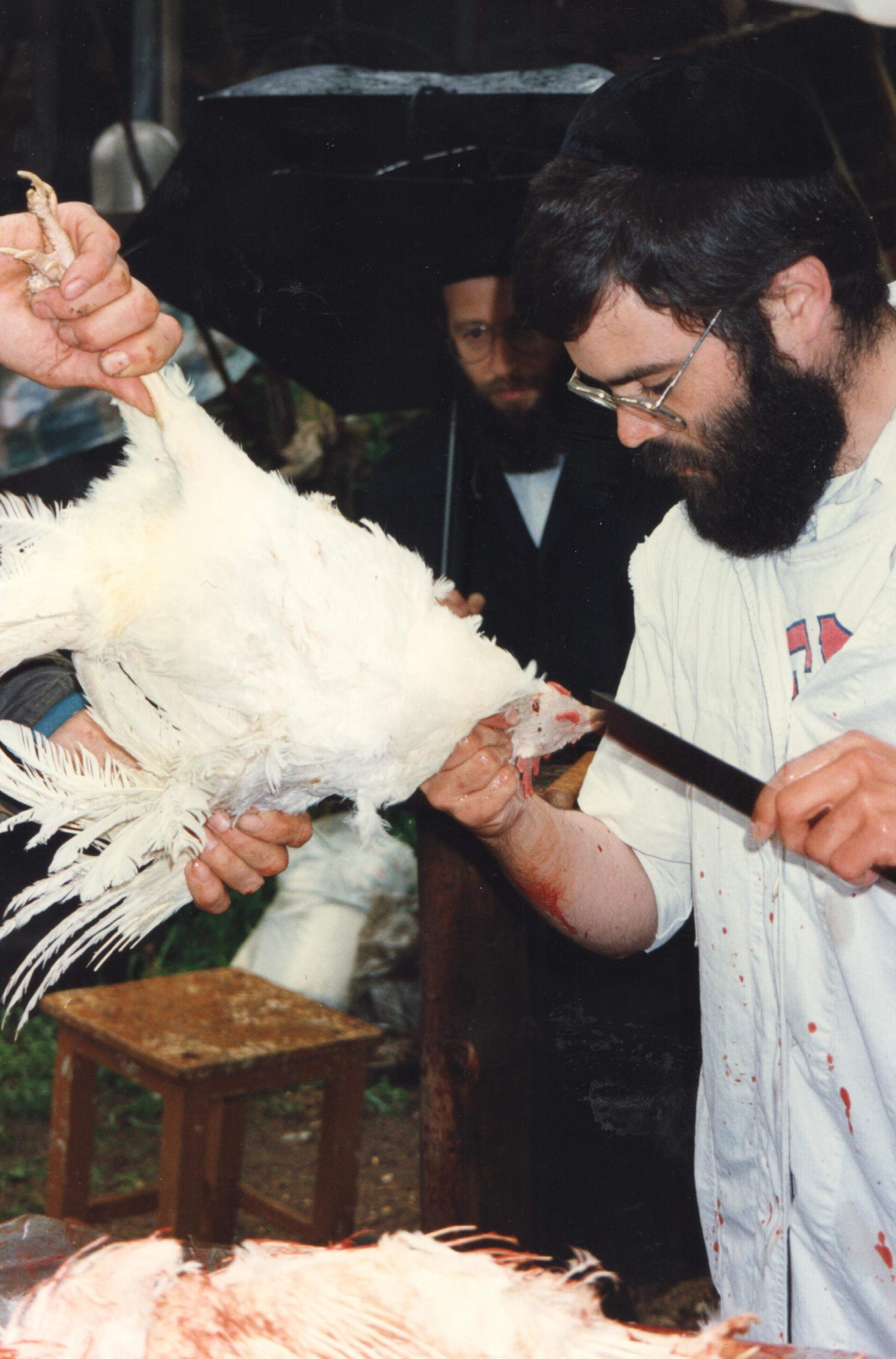
A shochet at work

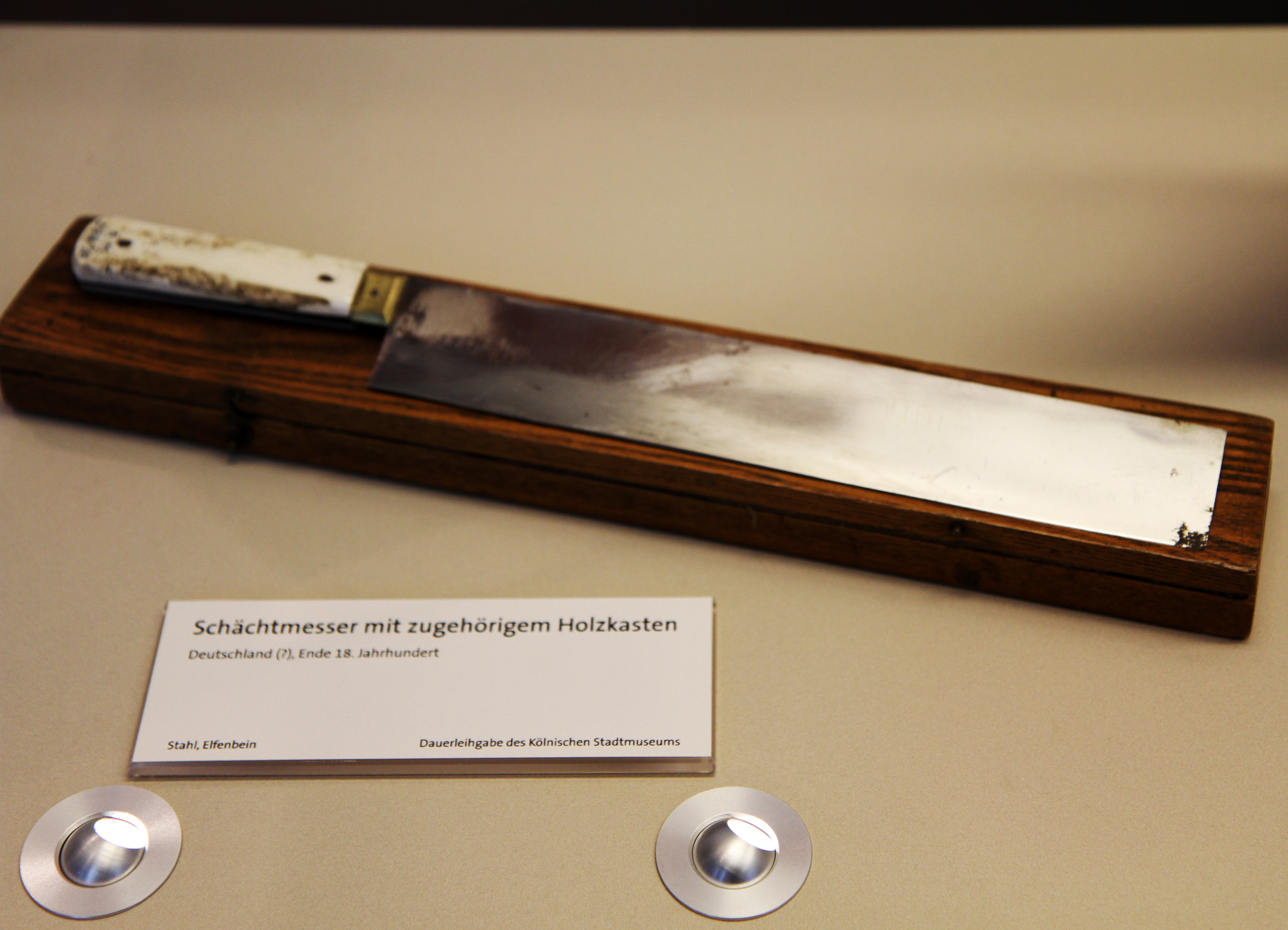
Shochet's knife

A kosher slaughterer or kosher butcher, also known as shochet (Hebrew: שוחט, plural shochtim, feminine plural shohatot) is a butcher of cattle and poultry, one of the professions associated with the religious traditions of the Jewish community (along with the professions of rabbi, mohel, scribe).

In the Jewish community, a butcher slaughters livestock and poultry intended for food in accordance with the requirements of kashrut (in particular, the animal must be killed "with respect and compassion"). The butcher must use an extremely sharp knife without the slightest nicks (the idea is that the animal should not feel pain). The throat is cut in one quick motion, after which the blood is immediately drained. This type of slaughter is called "kosher" and is designated by the word shechita. Before starting shechita, the butcher must make sure that the animal is healthy, uninjured and can move independently. The butcher's duties also include checking the internal organs, which is carried out after performing shechita (if there are defects or signs of disease, the meat is considered non-kosher, despite the correct slaughter), which is why the full name of this profession, translated from Hebrew into English, is "butcher and inspector" that should follow the laws of terefah.

Only a religious Jew who has undergone special training and passed an examination before the appropriate spiritual authority can become a butcher. A butcher must lead an impeccable life and not drink alcohol. Some butchers are only allowed to slaughter poultry. Traditionally, men have been shochtim. Opinions vary on whether women are permitted to be shohatot. Some authorities allow women, some forbid women, and others allow women as shohatot under limited circumstances.

== History ==
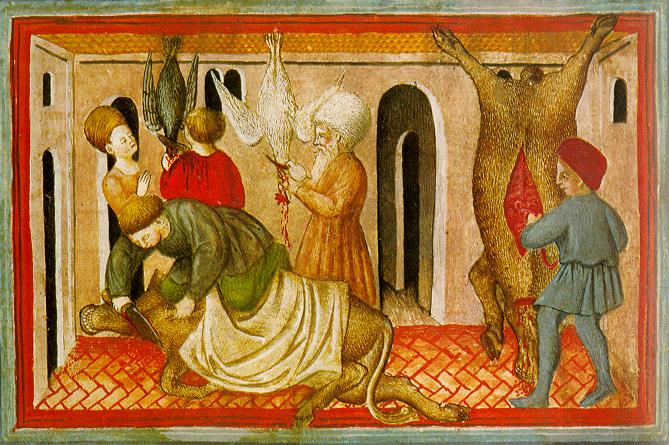
Medieval slaughter of chickens and calves, 15th century, Vatican, Vatican Library

In the medieval Jewish community, the butcher was an official, second in social status to the rabbi. Even a hundred years ago, some rabbis, especially in sparsely populated areas, were also butchers, although in most places the roles of rabbi and butcher were separated. In those villages where only two or three Jewish families lived, almost every young man who transitioned into being an adult in Jewish tradition began to study the laws of kosher slaughter so that the family could constantly eat fresh kosher meat and poultry. In the past, there were also women who received a kosher slaughter certificate and carried out this for the needs of their families, but later this was banned by Orthodox Judaism.

Nowadays, kosher slaughter of cattle and poultry is carried out mainly in modern automated slaughterhouses and is supervised by veterinarians. In this case, the butcher's duties are mainly limited to "guiding his knife" as required by the rules. In some Jewish settlements and villages, kosher slaughter of livestock and poultry by hand is still carried out from time to time, especially for family needs before holidays or celebrations. This requires the full work of a butcher.
