= George Stubbs =

British painter (1724–1806)

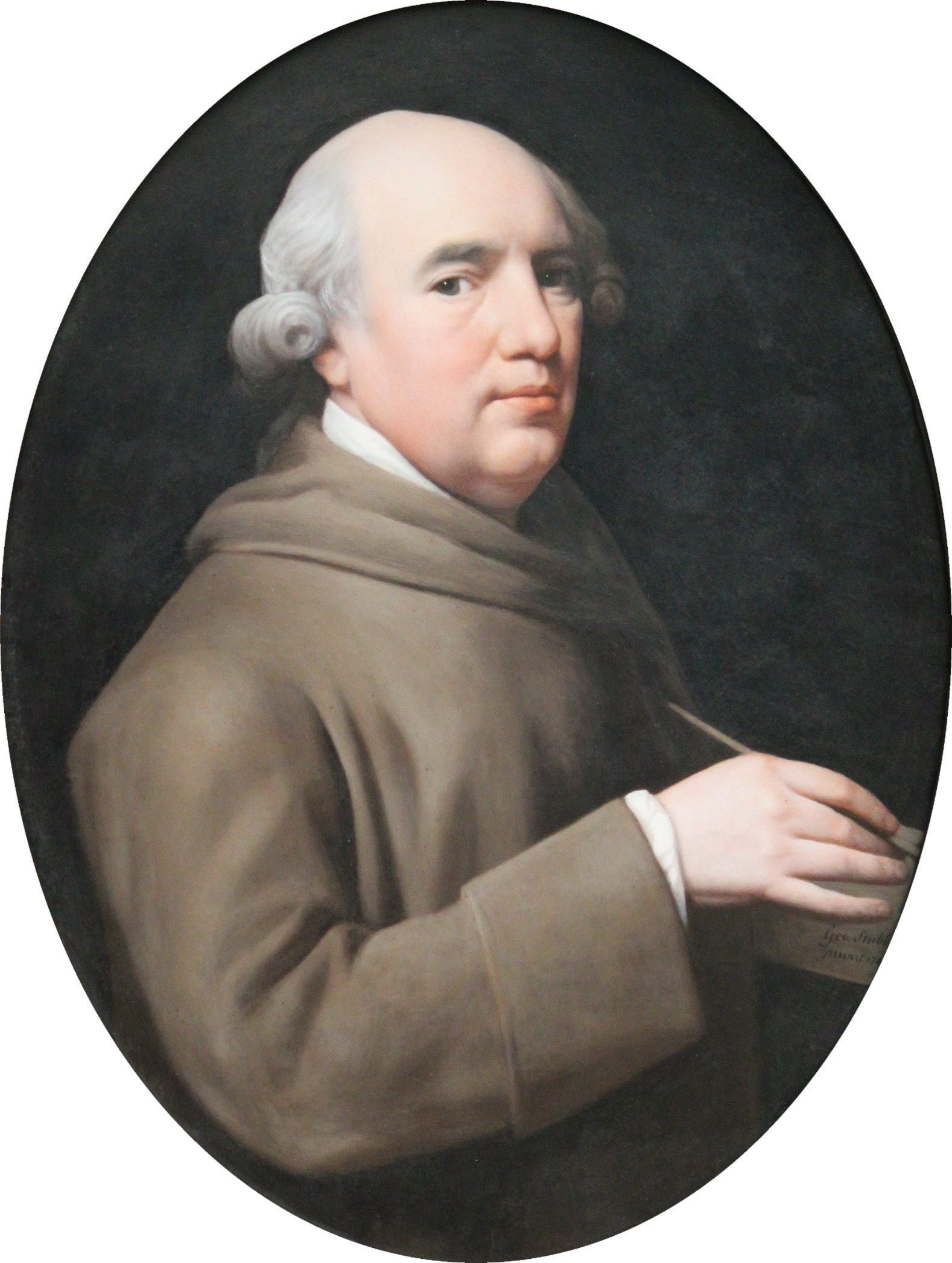
- A self-portrait by George Stubbs, 1781
- Born: 25 August 1724; Liverpool, Lancashire, England
- Died: 10 July 1806 (aged 81); Marylebone, Middlesex, England
- Occupation: Painter
- Works: A Lion Attacking a Horse, Whistlejacket
- Movement: Romanticism

George Stubbs ARA (25 August 1724 – 10 July 1806) was an English painter, best known for his paintings of horses. Self-trained, Stubbs learnt his skills independently from other great artists of the 18th century such as Joshua Reynolds and Thomas Gainsborough. Stubbs' output includes history paintings, but his greatest skill was in painting animals (such as horses, dogs and lions), perhaps influenced by his love and study of anatomy. His series of paintings on the theme of a lion attacking a horse are early and significant examples of the Romantic movement that emerged in the late 18th century. He enjoyed royal patronage. His painting Whistlejacket hangs in the National Gallery, London.

== Biography ==
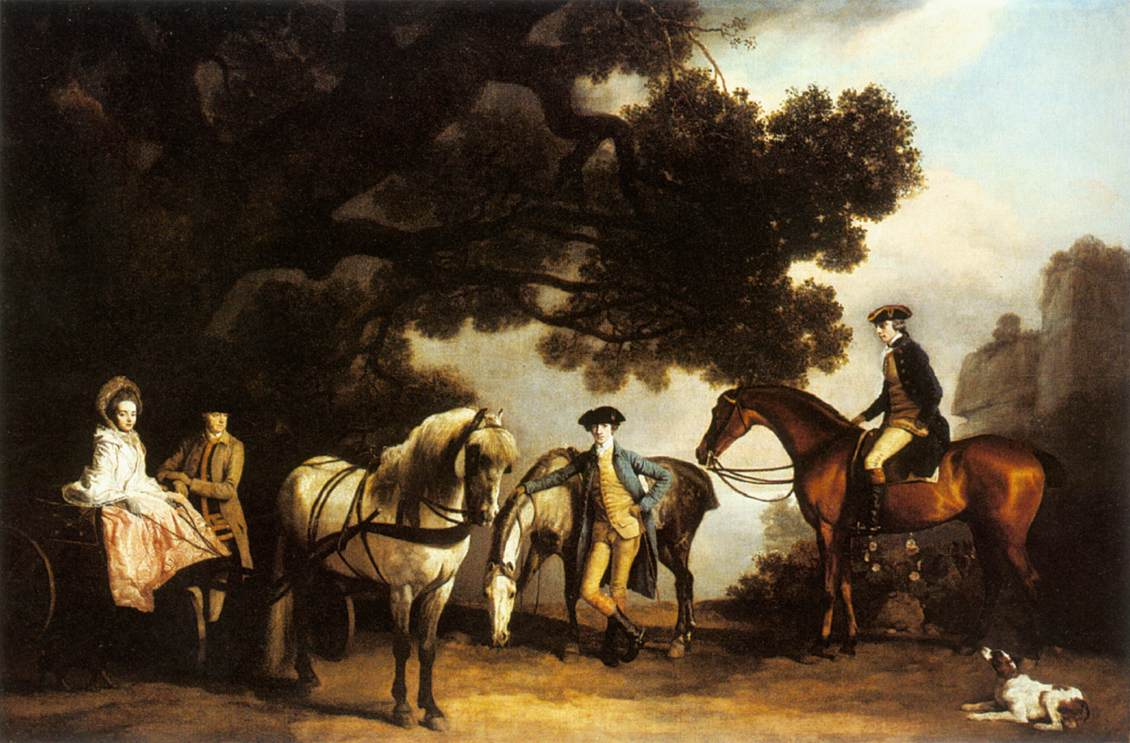
The Milbanke and Melbourne Families (ca. 1769), oil on canvas, 97 x 149 cm., National Gallery

Stubbs was born in Liverpool, the son of a currier, or leather-dresser, John Stubbs, and his wife Mary. Information on his life until the age of 35 or so is sparse, relying almost entirely on notes made by Ozias Humphry, a fellow artist and friend; Humphry's informal memoir, which was not intended for publication, was based on a series of private conversations he had with Stubbs around 1794, when Stubbs was 70 years old, and Humphry 52.

Stubbs worked at his father's trade until the age of 15 or 16, at which point he told his father that he wished to become a painter. While initially resistant, Stubbs's father (who died not long afterward in 1741), eventually acquiesced in his son's choice of a career path, on the condition that he could find an appropriate mentor. Stubbs subsequently approached the Lancashire painter and engraver Hamlet Winstanley, and was briefly engaged by him in a sort of apprenticeship relationship, probably not more than several weeks in duration. Having initially demonstrated his abilities and agreed to do some copying work, Stubbs had access to and opportunity to study the collection at Knowsley Hall near Liverpool, the estate where Winstanley was then residing; however, he soon left when he came into conflict with the older artist over exactly which pictures he could work on copying.

Thereafter, as an artist Stubbs was self-taught. He had had a passion for anatomy from his childhood, and in or around 1744, he moved to York, in the North of England, to pursue his ambition to study the subject under experts. In York, from 1745 to 1753, he worked as a portrait painter, and studied human anatomy under the surgeon Charles Atkinson, at York County Hospital, One of his earliest surviving works is a set of illustrations for a textbook on midwifery by John Burton, Essay towards a Complete New System of Midwifery, published in 1751.

In 1754 Stubbs visited Italy. Forty years later he told Ozias Humphry that his motive for going to Italy was, "to convince himself that nature was and is always superior to art whether Greek or Roman, and having renewed this conviction he immediately resolved upon returning home". In 1756 he rented a farmhouse in the village of Horkstow, Lincolnshire, and spent 18 months dissecting horses, assisted by his common-law wife, Mary Spencer. He moved to London in about 1759 and in 1766 published The anatomy of the Horse. The original drawings are now in the collection of the Royal Academy.

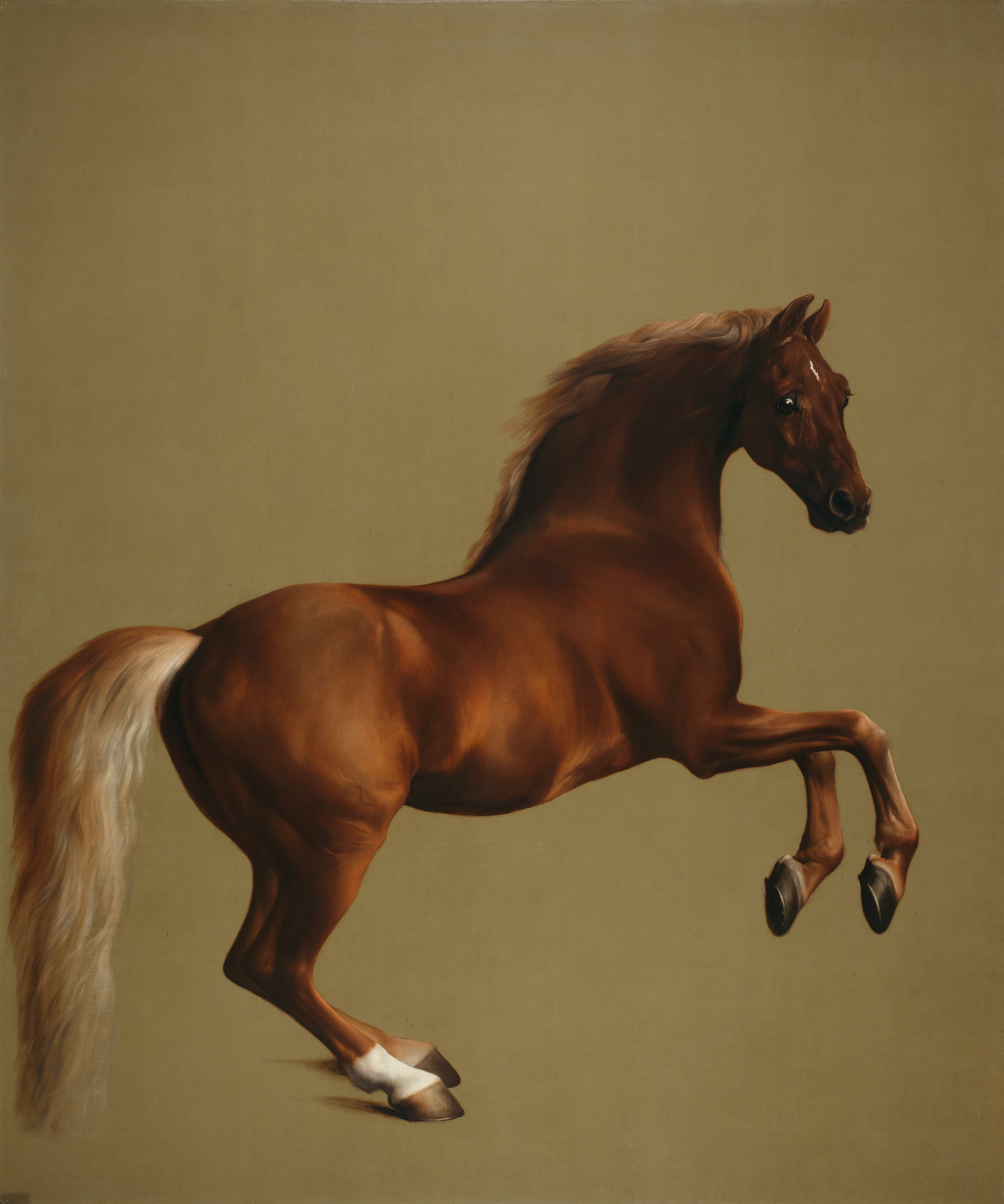
Whistlejacket (ca. 1762), oil on canvas, 292 x 246.4 cm., National Gallery

Even before his book was published, Stubbs's drawings were seen by leading aristocratic patrons, who recognised that his work was more accurate than that of earlier horse painters such as James Seymour, Peter Tillemans and John Wootton. In 1759 Charles Lennox, 3rd Duke of Richmond commissioned three large pictures from him, and his career was soon secure. By 1763 he had produced works for several more dukes and other lords and was able to buy a house in Marylebone, a fashionable part of London, where he lived for the rest of his life.

A famous work, Whistlejacket, a painting of the thoroughbred race horse rising on his hind legs, commissioned by Charles Watson-Wentworth, 2nd Marquess of Rockingham, is now in the National Gallery in London. This and two other paintings carried out for Rockingham break with convention in having plain backgrounds. Throughout the 1760s he produced a wide range of individual and group portraits of horses, sometimes accompanied by hounds. He often painted horses with their grooms, whom he always painted as individuals. Meanwhile, he also continued to accept commissions for portraits of people, including some group portraits. From the inaugural Exhibition of 1761 onwards he exhibited at the Society of Artists of Great Britain at Spring Gardens, but in 1775 he switched his allegiance to the recently founded but already more prestigious Royal Academy of Arts. He served as President of the Society of Artists for a year from October 1772, when it was already beset by financial problems and defections to the Royal Academy.

Stubbs created prints, engravings or paintings of each of the three horses that are the foundation of the Thoroughbred horse breed. The set of three framed prints are for sale and are located in the National Trust Collections in the United Kingdom. The title of one is The Godolphin Barb or The Godolphin Arabian (c. 1724 – 1753) with Grimalkin the Stable Cat (after George Stubbs after David Morier).

Stubbs also painted more exotic animals including lions, tigers, giraffes, monkeys, and rhinoceroses, which he was able to observe in private menageries.

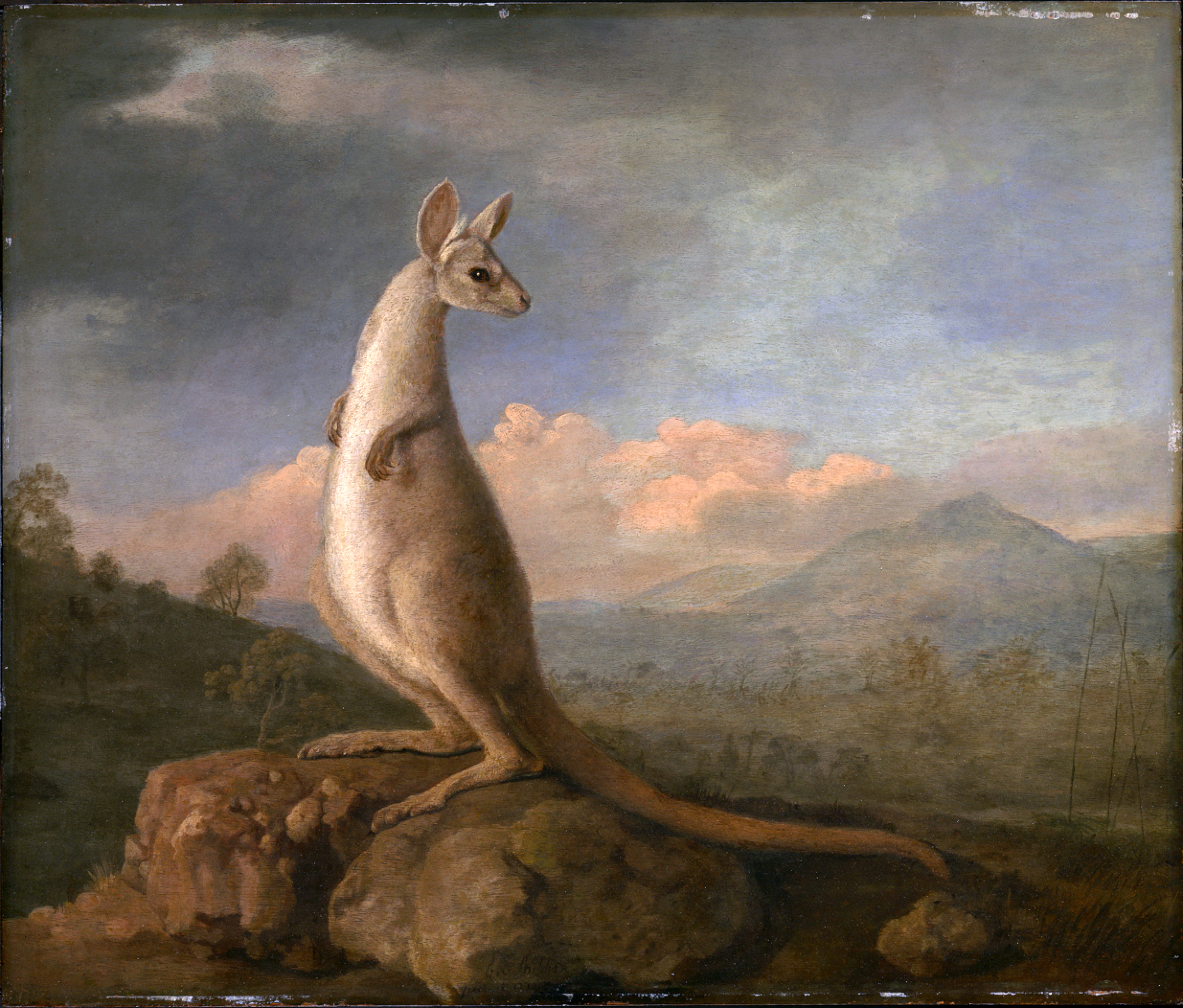
Painting of a kangaroo, 1772

His painting of a kangaroo was the first glimpse of this animal for many 18th-century Britons. He became preoccupied with the theme of a wild horse threatened by a lion and produced several variations on this theme. These and other works became well known at the time through engravings of Stubbs's work, which appeared in increasing numbers in the 1770s and 1780s.

Stubbs also painted historical pictures, but these are much less well regarded. From the late 1760s he produced some work on enamel. In the 1770s Josiah Wedgwood developed a new and larger type of enamel panel at Stubbs's request. Stubbs hoped to achieve commercial success with his paintings in enamel, but the venture left him in debt. Also in the 1770s he painted single portraits of dogs for the first time, while also receiving an increasing number of commissions to paint hunts with their packs of hounds. He remained active into his old age. In the 1780s he produced a pastoral series called Haymakers and Reapers, and in the early 1790s he enjoyed the patronage of the Prince of Wales, whom he painted on horseback in 1791. His last project, begun in 1795, was A comparative anatomical exposition of the structure of the human body with that of a tiger and a common fowl, fifteen engravings from which appeared between 1804 and 1806. The project was left unfinished upon Stubbs's death. He died at the age of 81 on 10 July 1806 at the home he had lived in since 1763, No.24 Somerset Street, near Portman Square, Marylebone, central London. He was buried on 18 July in the graveyard of St Marylebone Parish Church, now a garden of rest.

Stubbs's son George Townley Stubbs was an engraver and printmaker.

== A lion attacking a horse ==
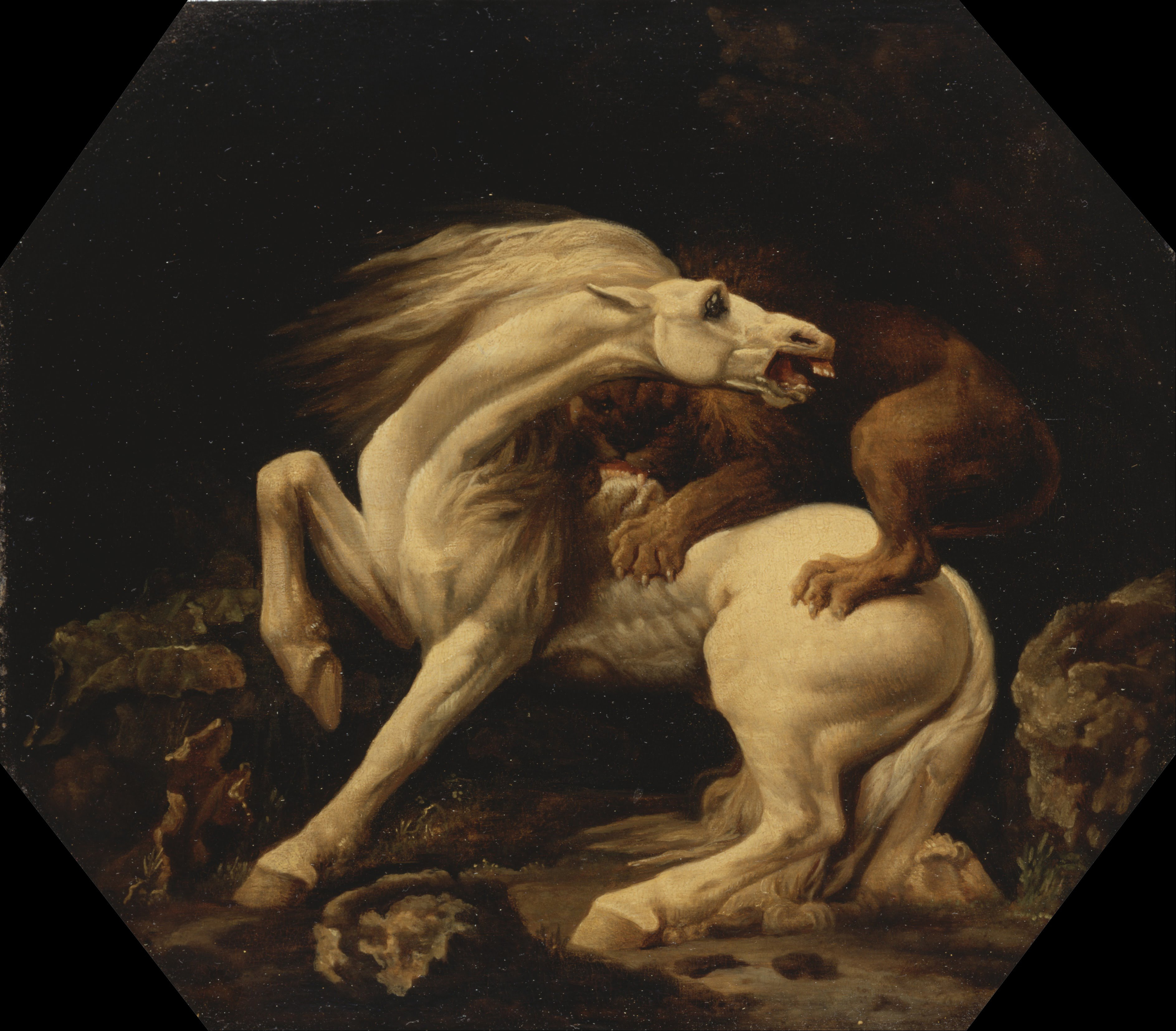
Horse Attacked by a Lion (1768–69), oil on panel, 25.7 x 29.5 cm., Yale Center for British Art

Stubbs began an informal series of works on the subject of a lion attacking a horse around 1762 or 1763, and he continued to explore and reinterpret the theme in at least 17 images over a period of about 30 years. These paintings are among his most celebrated and influential works. One art historian wrote "The appearance of the monumental picture now in the Mellon Collection [A Lion Attacking a Horse, ca. 1762-63] must be treated as one of the outstanding events in English eighteenth-century art for within the context of painting at that date its singularity as well as its inherent originality is most striking. Not since the publication of Hogarth's Harlot's Progress thirty years before had there occurred such an innovation." The iconic paintings are in fact among the earliest manifestations of Romanticism in painting, predating the work of more familiar masters of the movement such as William Blake, Eugène Delacroix, Francisco Goya, William Turner, and Théodore Géricault, who was known to be an admirer of both horses, and the work of George Stubbs. Jean Clay, professor of art history at the University of Paris, perceptively observed that not only does the energy and terror of the animals foreshadow the spirit of romanticism but, as Stubbs's series progressed, the horror seemed to diffuse and expand throughout the whole of the landscape: "an image that would fertilize the Romantic imagination and come to full flower a half-century later."

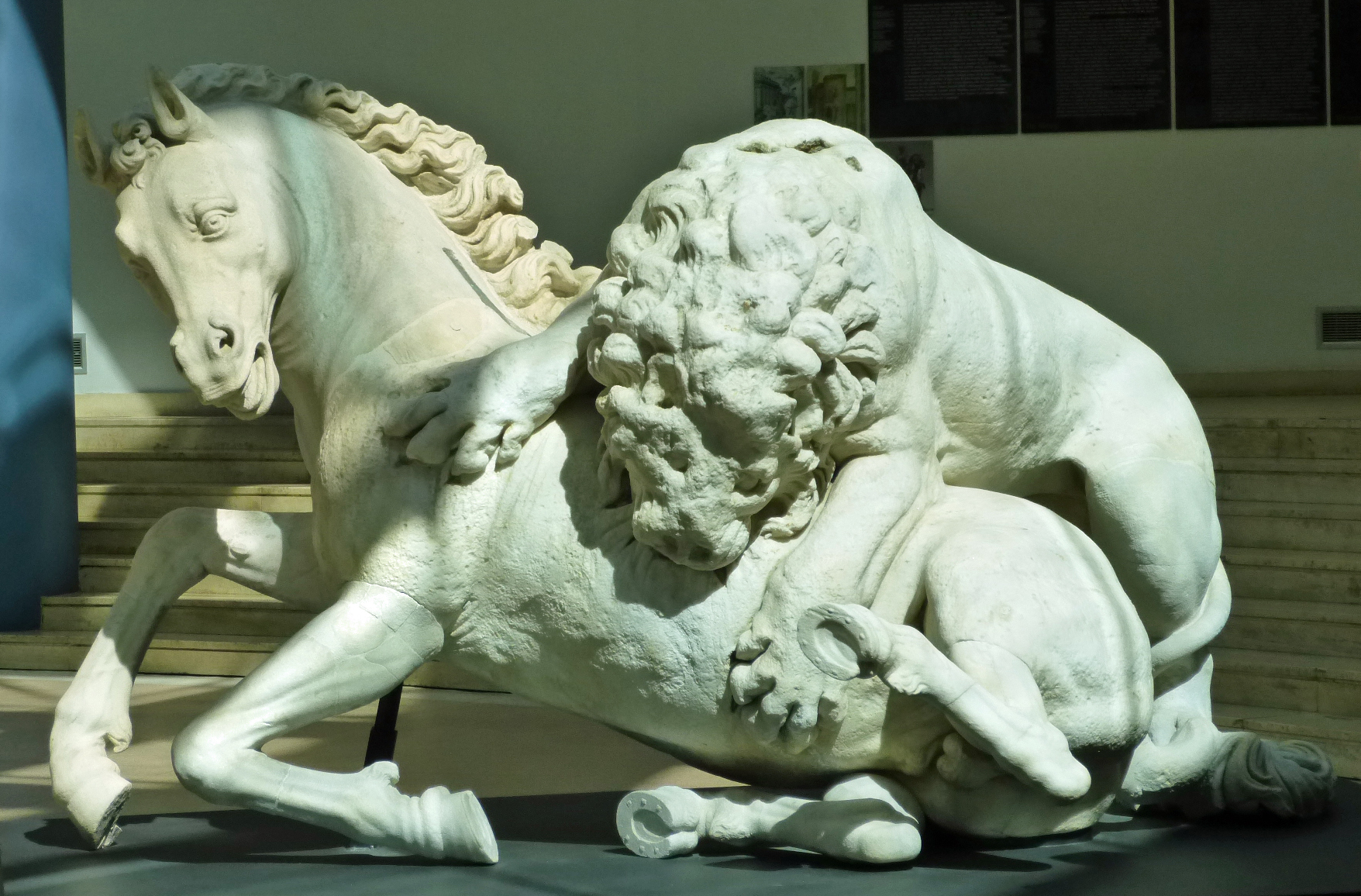
Lion Seizing a Horse, restored Roman copy of Hellenistic original, Palazzo dei Conservatori

The series are mostly oil paintings on canvas, but also include examples of enamel on copper, original engravings, and even a relief model in Wedgwood clay. The white horse was painted from one of the Kings Horses in the Royal Mews, secured for the artist by an architect friend, Mr. Payne. Stubbs was able to study a lion in life that was in the menagerie of William Petty, 2nd Earl of Shelburne at Hounslow Heath. The earliest work is a life-size painting of A Lion Attacking a Horse (ca. 1762–63), which was commissioned by the 2nd Marquess of Rockingham and now in the Yale Center for British Art. Art historian Basil Taylor postulated the theme was treated in three distinct episodes: Episode A, a lion prowling at some distance from a terrified horse; Episode B, a lion close to a terrified horse; Episode C a lion on the horse's back biting its flank. Interestingly, Stubbs first painted "Episode C", and it was not until later that he was inspired to go back and paint the moments leading up to the climatic event.

An anecdote regarding the origin of the subject matter emerged soon after the artist death, originally published in The Sporting Magazine in 1808, and reiterate often for well over a century and a half. Art historian H. W. Janson repeated it "On a visit to North Africa, he had seen a horse killed by a lion; this experience haunted his imagination, and from it he developed a new type of animal picture full of Romantic feeling for the grandeur and violence of nature." However, research published in 1965 produced a rather persuasive argument that Stubbs in fact never traveled to Africa, and the actual inspiration for the painting was an antique sculpture he had seen in a well documented 1754 stay in Rome. The sculpture, Lion Seizing a Horse, in the Palazzo dei Conservatori, Rome, is a restored Roman copy of a Hellenistic original. It has been a celebrated work since the Renaissance, admired by Michelangelo, included in guidebooks of Stubbs's day, and copied any number of times by various artist in marble, bronze, and prints, including an 18th-century marble copy in the collection of Stubbs's patron Henry Blundell, who also acquired one of the paintings by Stubbs.

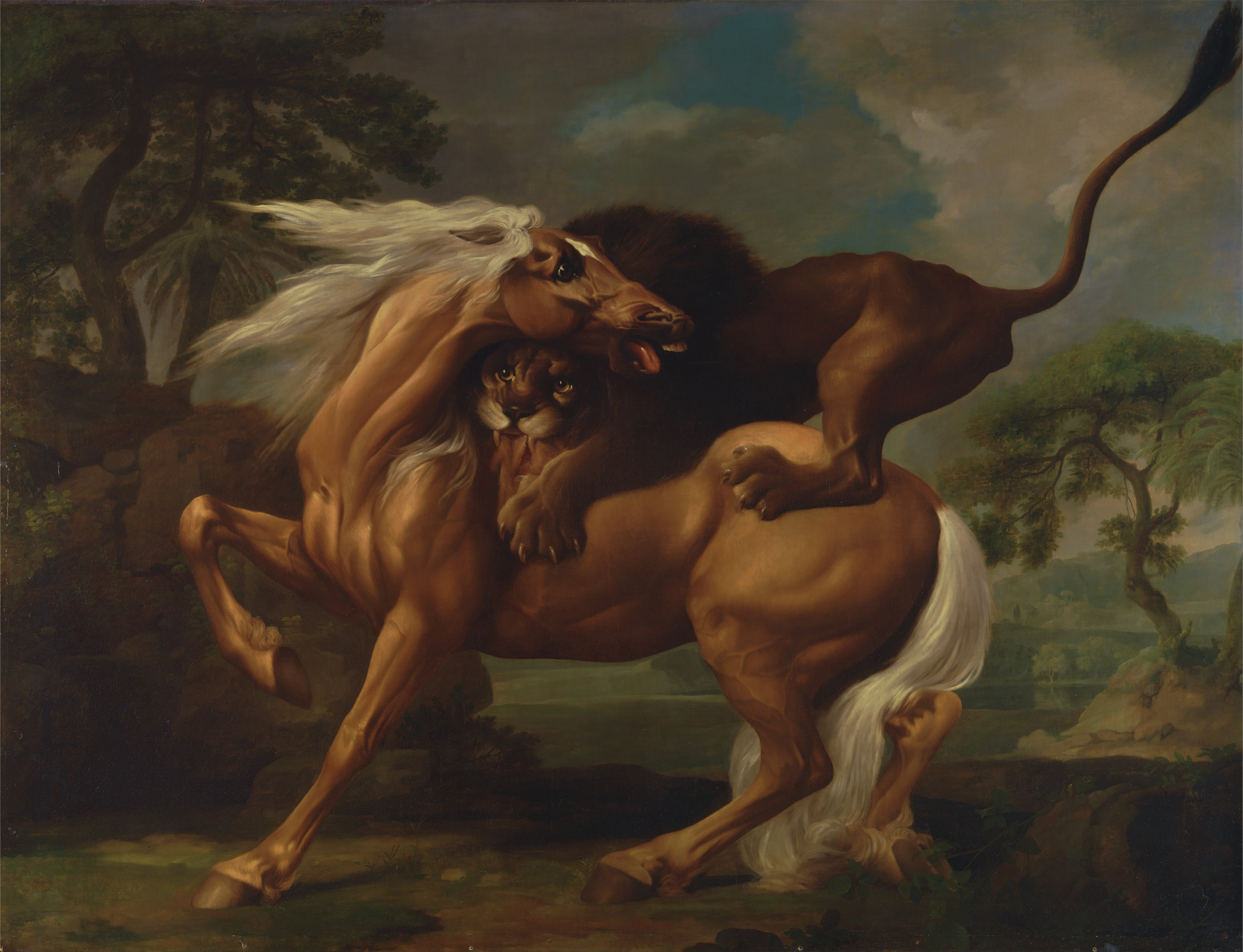
A Lion Attacking a Horse (ca. 1762–63), oil on canvas, 243.8 x 332.7 cm., Yale Center for British Art

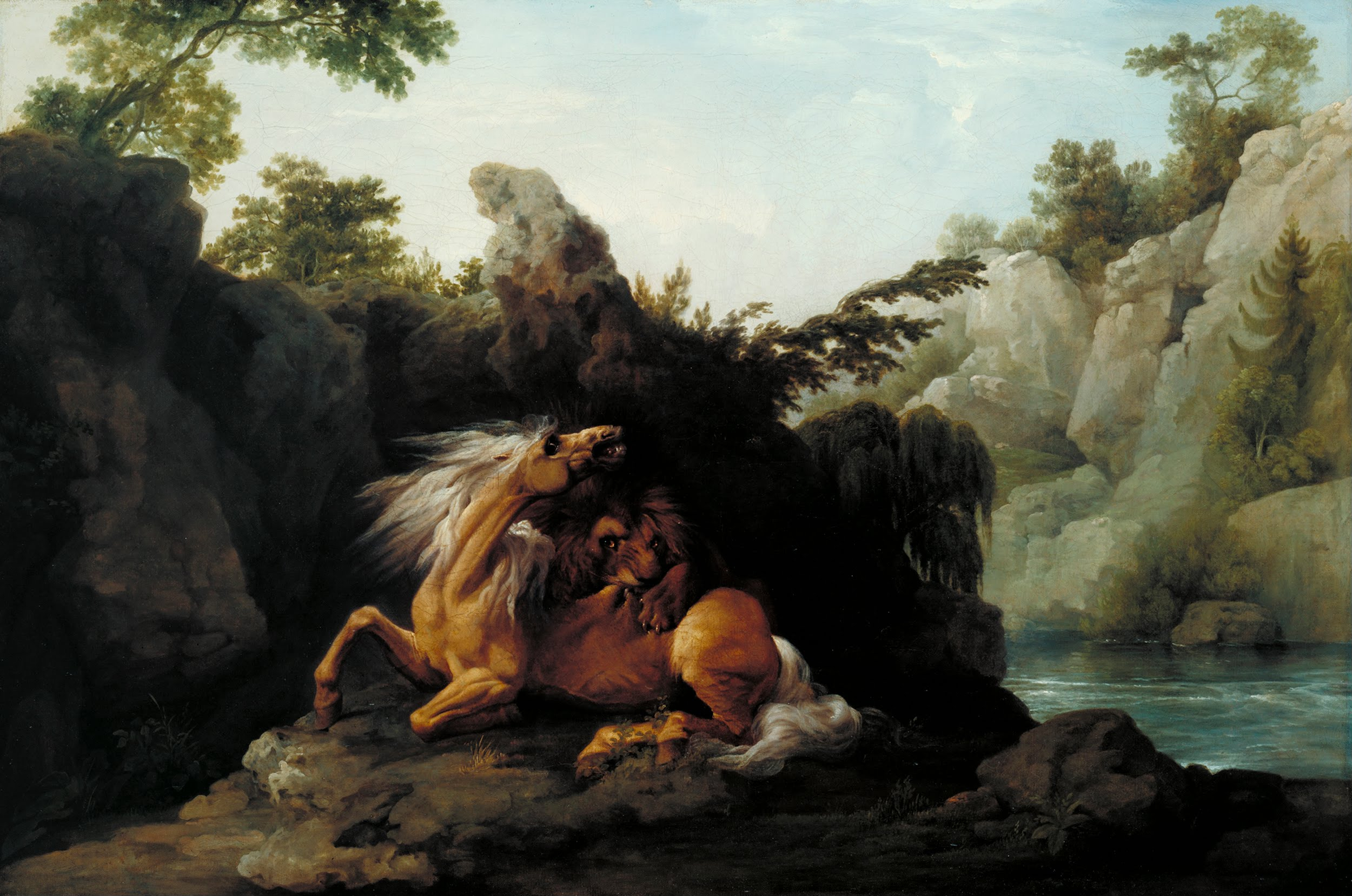
Horse Devoured by a Lion (1763), oil on canvas, 69.2 x 103.5 cm., Tate Britain

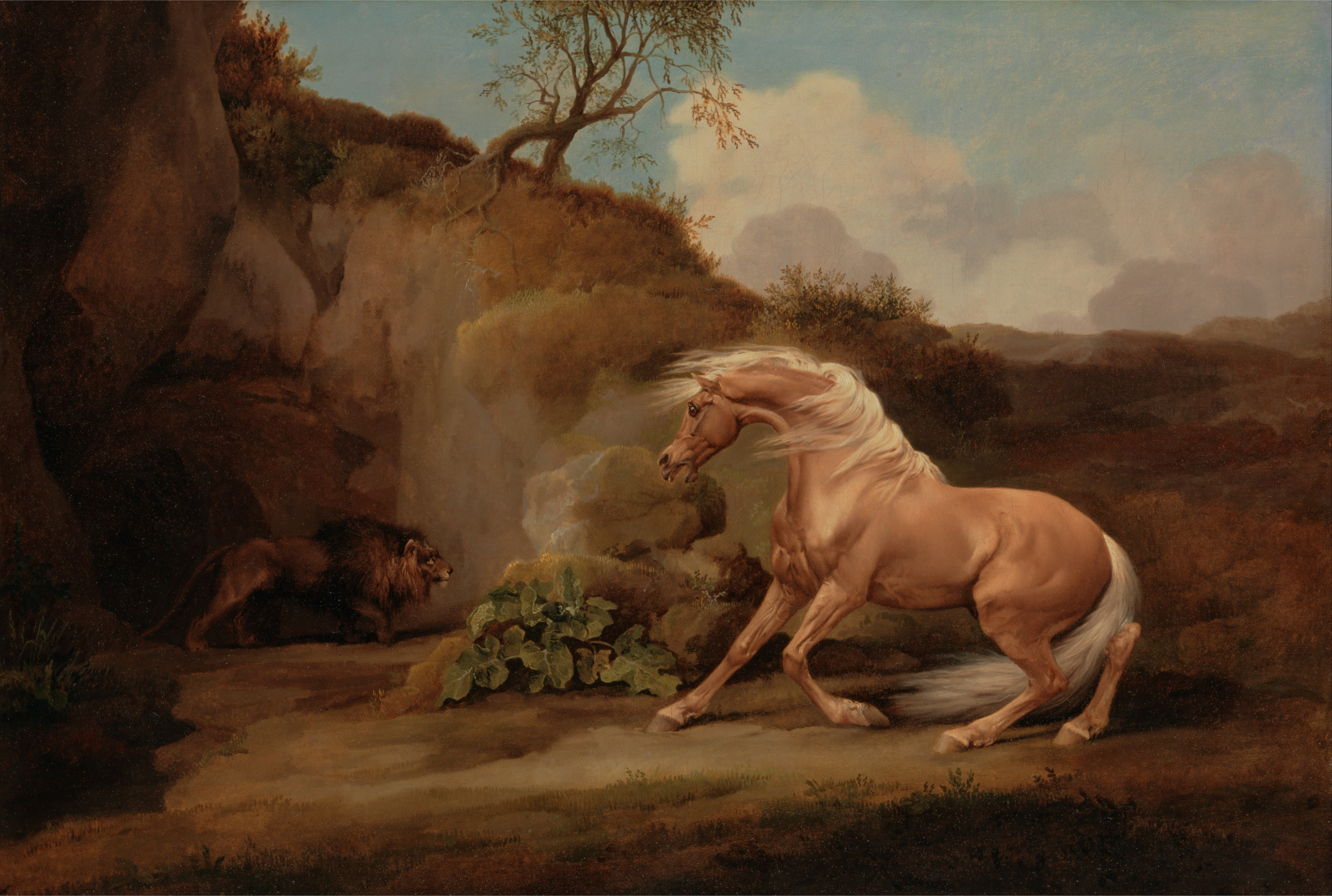
Horse Frightened by a Lion (ca. 1763 -1768), oil on canvas, 70.5 x 104.1 cm., Yale Center for British Art

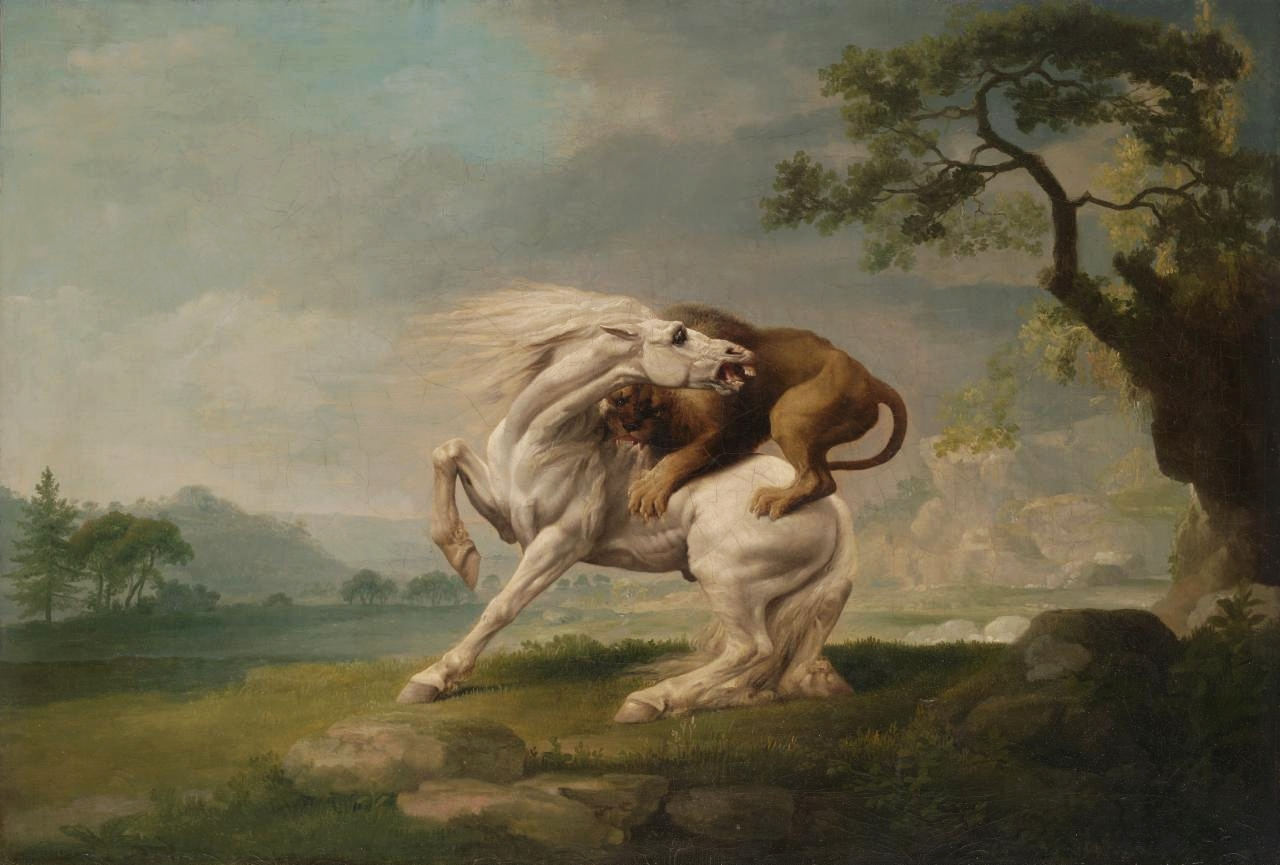
A Lion Attacking a Horse (1765) oil on canvas, 69 x 100.1 cm., National Gallery of Victoria

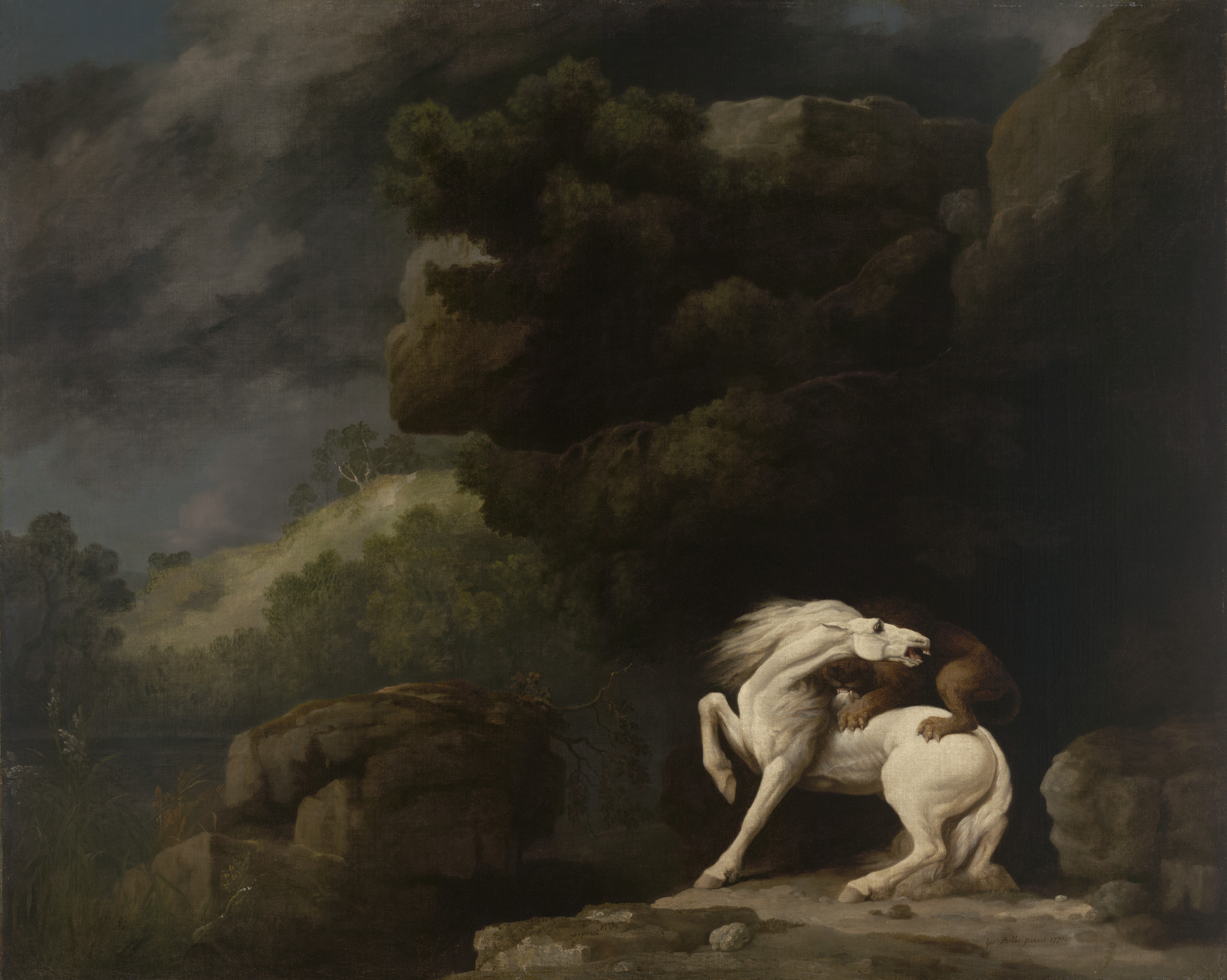
A Lion Attacking a Horse (1770), oil on canvas, 38 in. x 49 1/2in., Yale Center for British Art

== Legacy ==
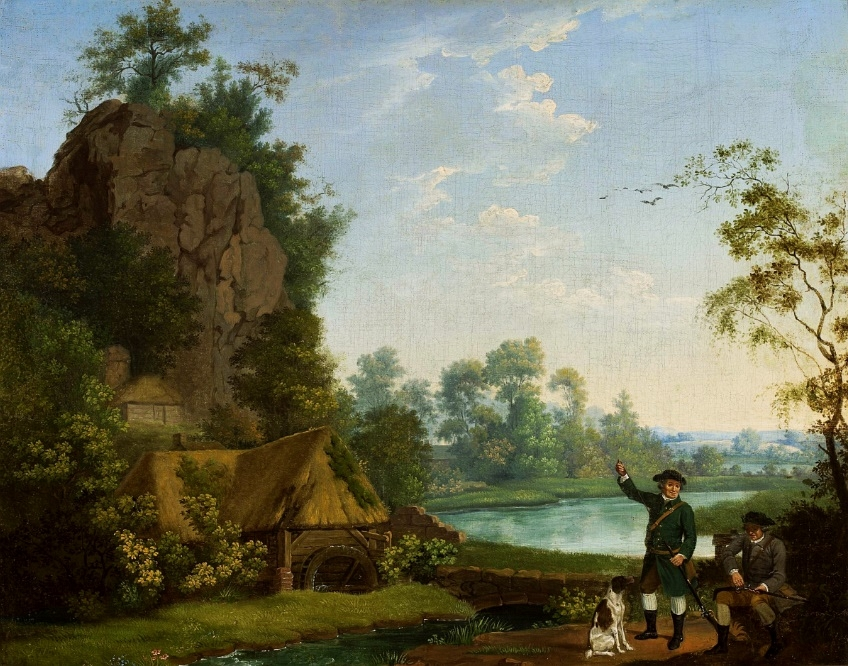
Two Gentlemen Going a Shooting, with a View of Creswell Crags (ca. 1767), oil on canvas, 54 x 64 cm., National Museum in Warsaw

Stubbs remained a secondary figure in British art until the mid-twentieth century. The art historian Basil Taylor and art collector Paul Mellon both championed Stubbs's work. Stubbs's Pumpkin with a Stable-lad was the first painting that Mellon bought in 1936. Basil Taylor was commissioned in 1955 by Pelican Press to write the book Animal Painting in England – From Barlow to Landseer, which included a large segment on Stubbs. In 1959 Mellon and Taylor first met and bonded over their appreciation of Stubbs. This led Mellon to create the Paul Mellon Foundation for British Art (the predecessor of the Paul Mellon Centre for Studies in British Art) with Taylor as the director. Mellon eventually amassed the largest collection of Stubbs paintings in the world which would become a part of his larger collection of British art that would become the Yale Center for British Art in Connecticut, USA. In 1971, Taylor published the seminal catalogue, Stubbs.

The record price for a Stubbs painting was set by the sale at auction of Gimcrack on Newmarket Heath, with a Trainer, a Stable-Lad, and a Jockey (1765) at Christie's in London in July 2011 for £22.4 million. It was sold by the Woolavington Collection of sporting art at Cottesbrooke Hall, Northamptonshire; the buyer was unidentified.

The Royal Collection of the British royal family holds 16 paintings by Stubbs.

Two paintings by Stubbs were bought by the National Maritime Museum in Greenwich, London after a public appeal to raise the £1.5 million required. The two paintings, The Kongouro from New Holland and Portrait of a Large Dog were both painted in 1772. Depicting a kangaroo and a dingo respectively, they are the first depictions of Australian animals in Western art.

His work was shown in a retrospective exhibition at the Whitechapel Gallery in London, 27 February – 7 April 1957. Tate Britain, in conjunction with the Yale Center for British Art, organized the largest exhibition ever devoted to Stubbs (up to that time) in 1984, which travelled to New Haven in 1985.

Stubbs' work was shown in Stubbs and the Horse, an exhibit co-organized and exhibited at The Kimbell Art Museum, Fort Worth, Texas (exhibited 14 November 2004–6 February 2005), the Walters Art Museum, Baltimore (exhibited 13 March–29 May 2005), and the National Gallery, London (Summer 2005). The exhibition catalog was written by Malcolm Warner and Robin Blake.

From 6 April–8 November 2015, the Metropolitan Museum of Art displayed Paintings by George Stubbs from the Yale Center for British Art.

== In popular culture ==
A fictional painting by Stubbs plays a key role in the Robert Galbraith novel Lethal White.

Anthony Jennings' 2024 novel Mister Stubbs explores the painter's early years, focusing on his time in York during Bonnie Prince Charlie's rebellion of 1745, and his mysterious trip to Rome, where Bonnie Prince Charlie's father, the exiled Jacobite James Edward Stuart, had his court.

== Gallery ==
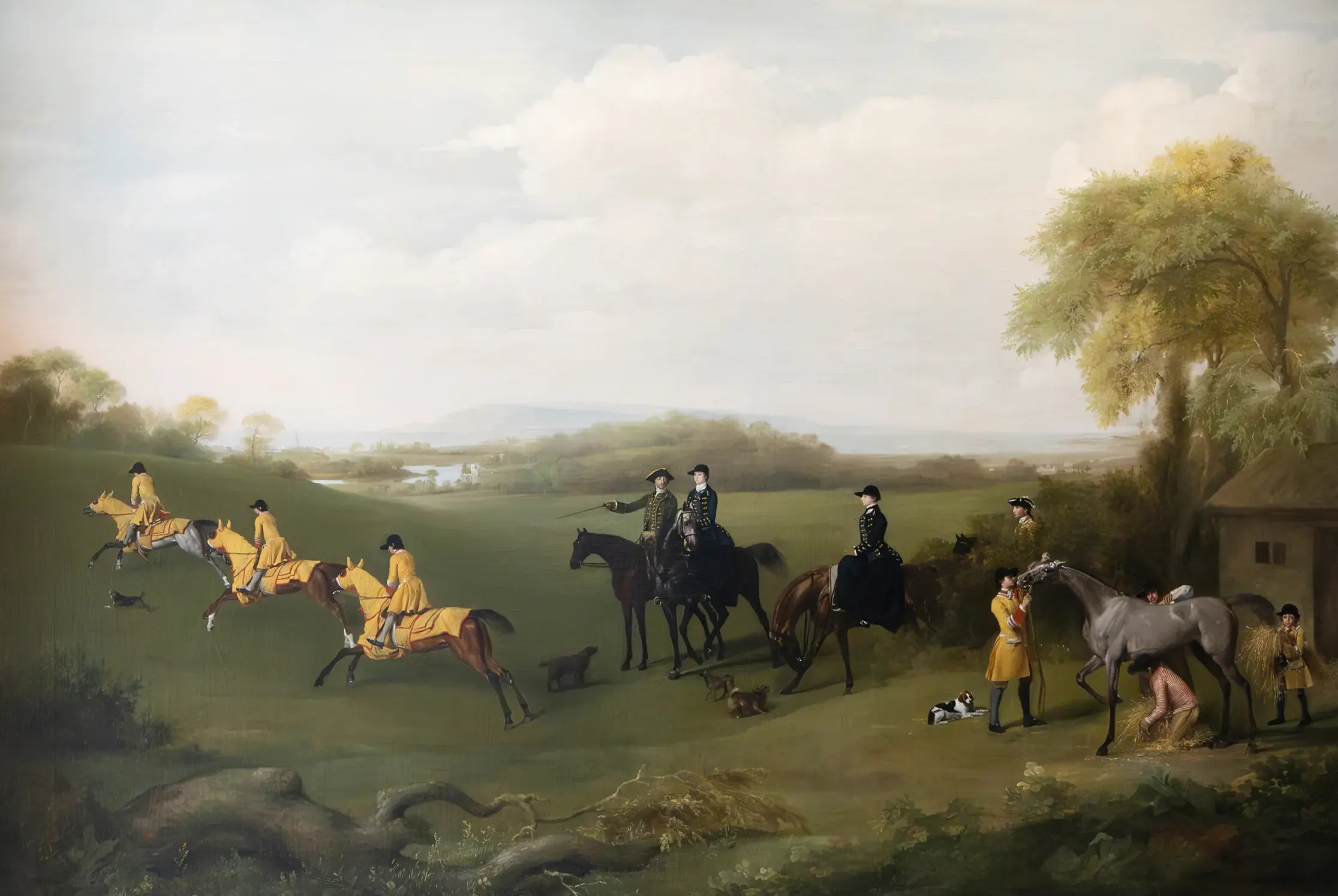
Racehorses Exercising at Goodwood (1759–60), oil on canvas, 127.5 x 204 cm.. Goodwood House

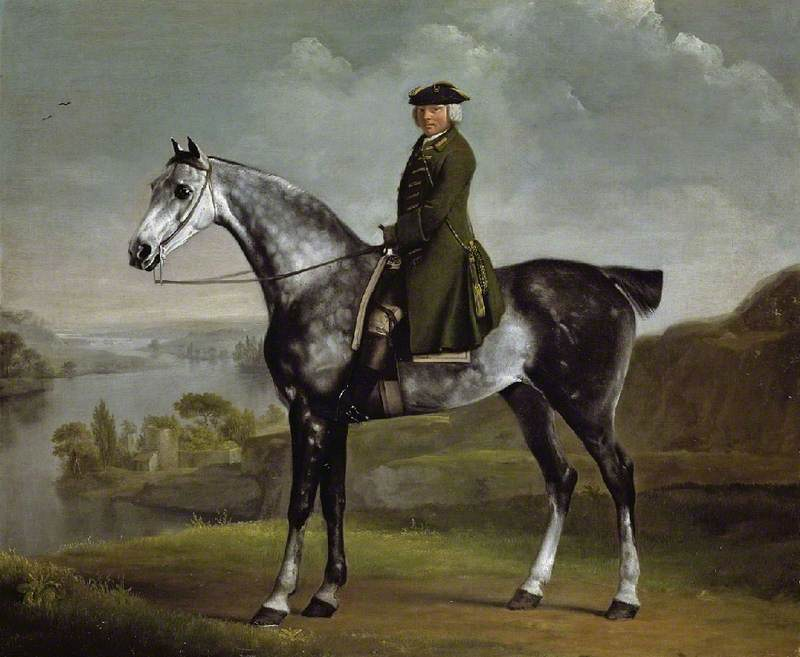
Joseph Smyth Esq, Lieutenant of Whittlebury Forest, Northamptonshire, on a Dapple Grey Horse (1762–64), oil on canvas, 64.2 x 76.8 cm., Fitzwilliam Museum

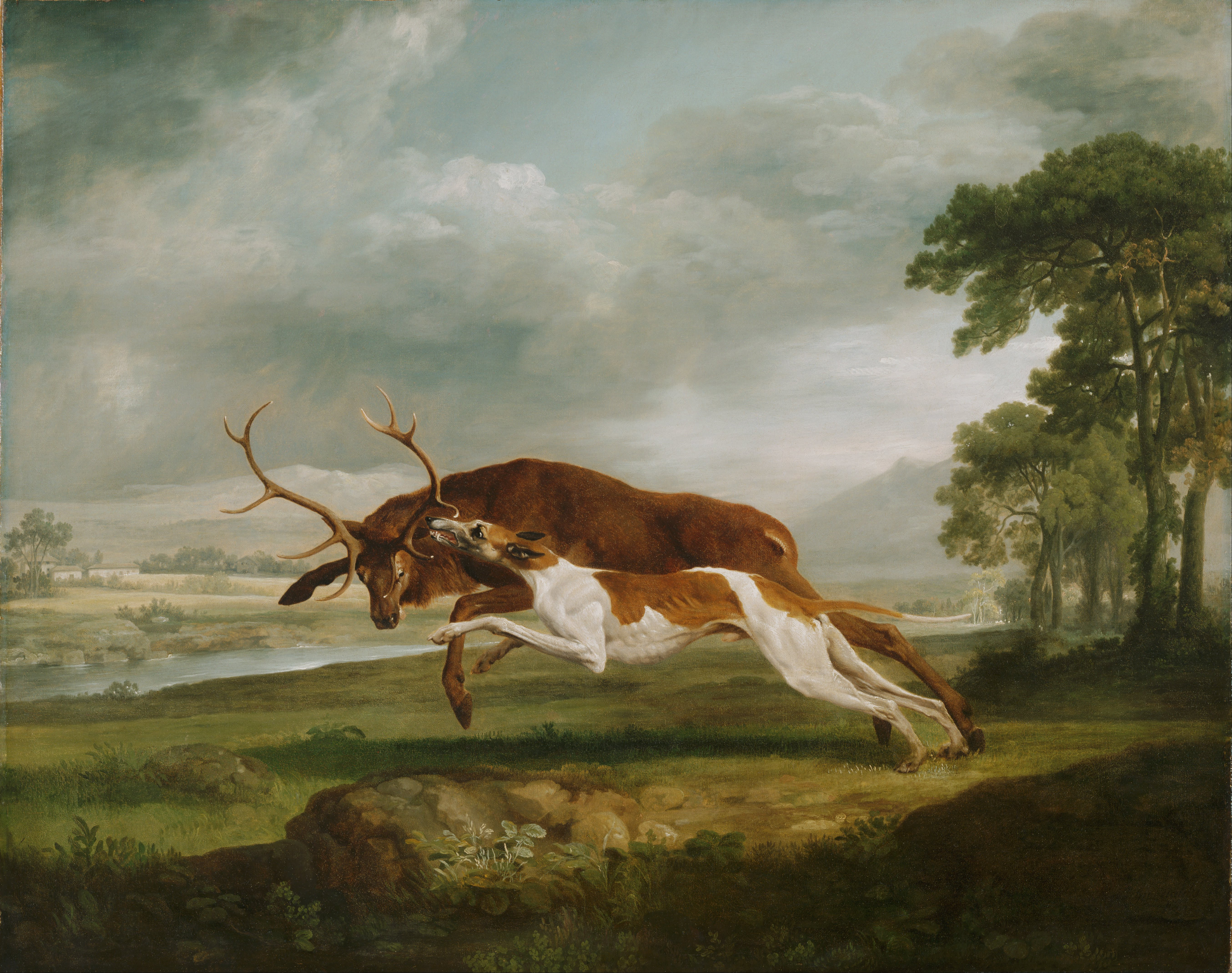
Hound Coursing a Stag (ca. 1762), oil on canvas, 100.1 x 125.8 cm., Philadelphia Museum of Art

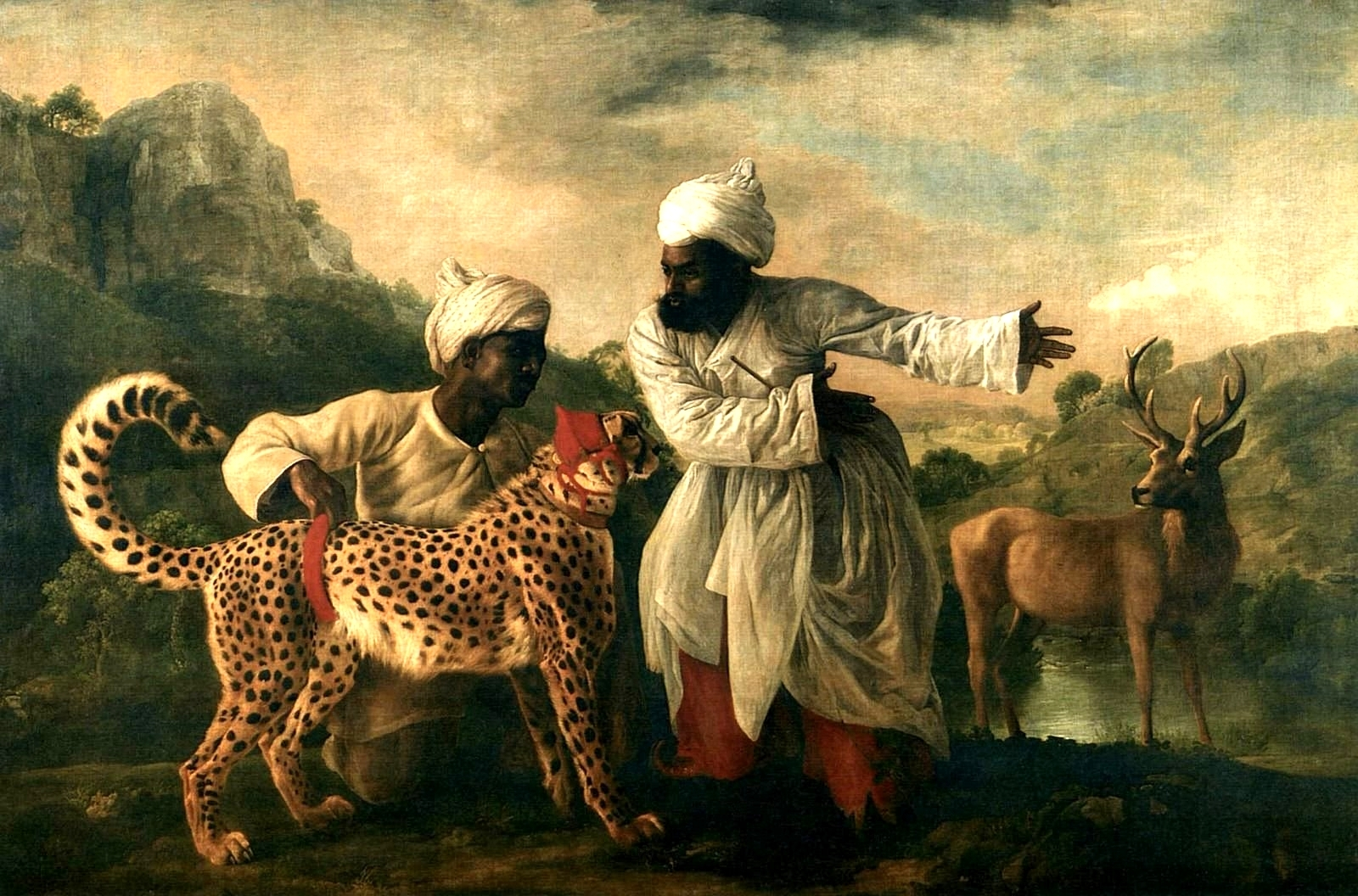
Cheetah and Stag with Two Indians (ca. 1765), oil on canvas, 182.7 x 275.3 cm., Manchester Art Gallery

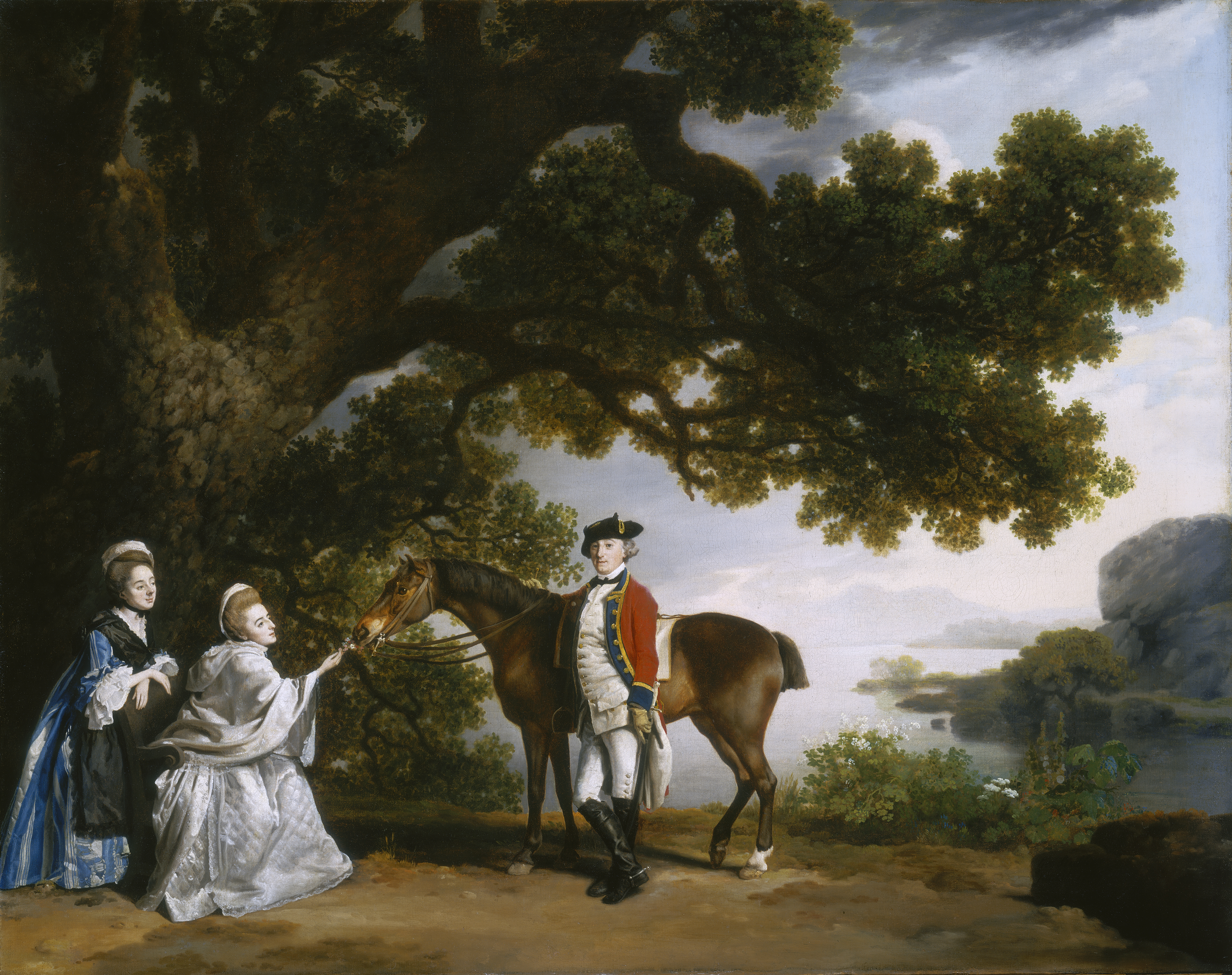
Captain Samuel Sharpe Pocklington with His Wife, Pleasance, and possibly His Sister, Frances (1769), oil on canvas, 100.2 x 126.6 cm., National Gallery of Art

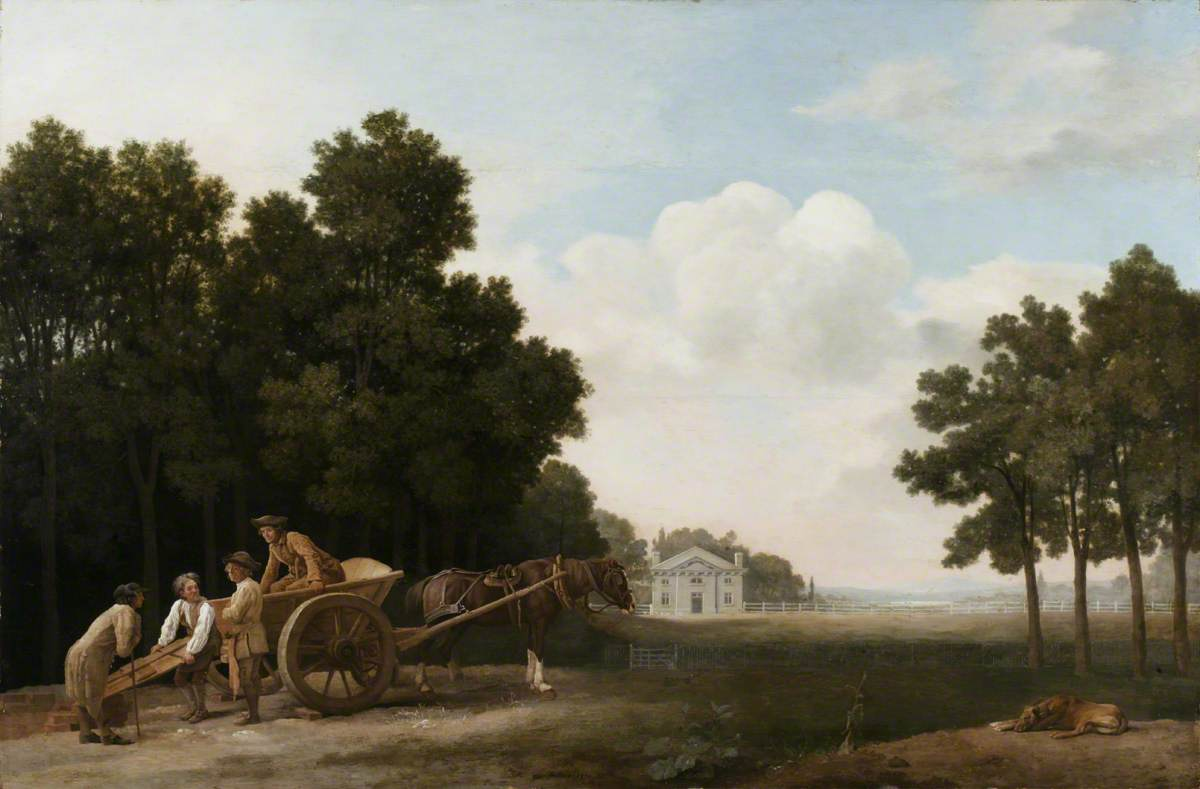
The Labourers (1779), oil on panel, 91.5 x 137cm, Upton House

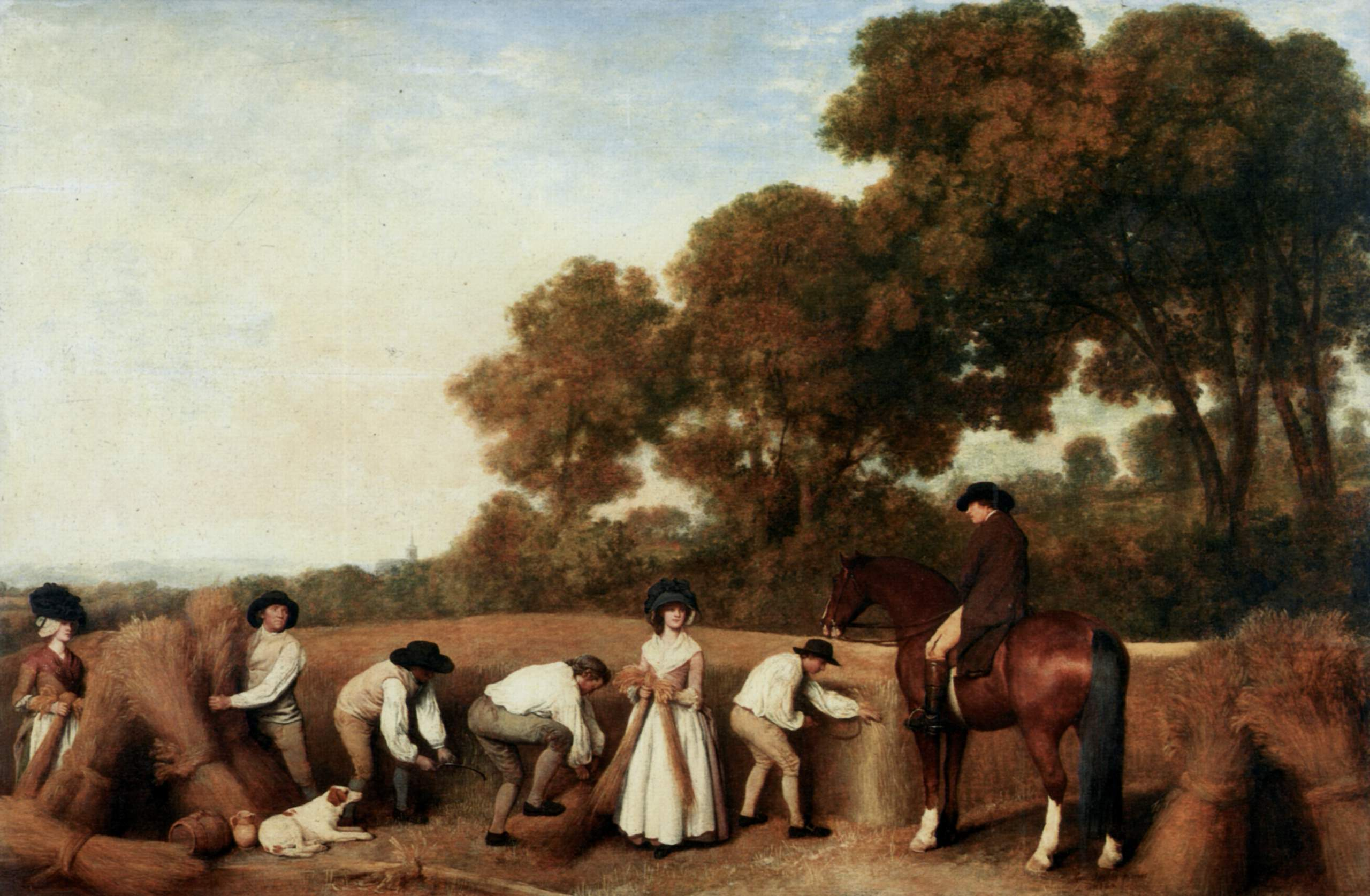
Reapers (1785), oil on canvas, 90 x 137 cm., Tate Britain

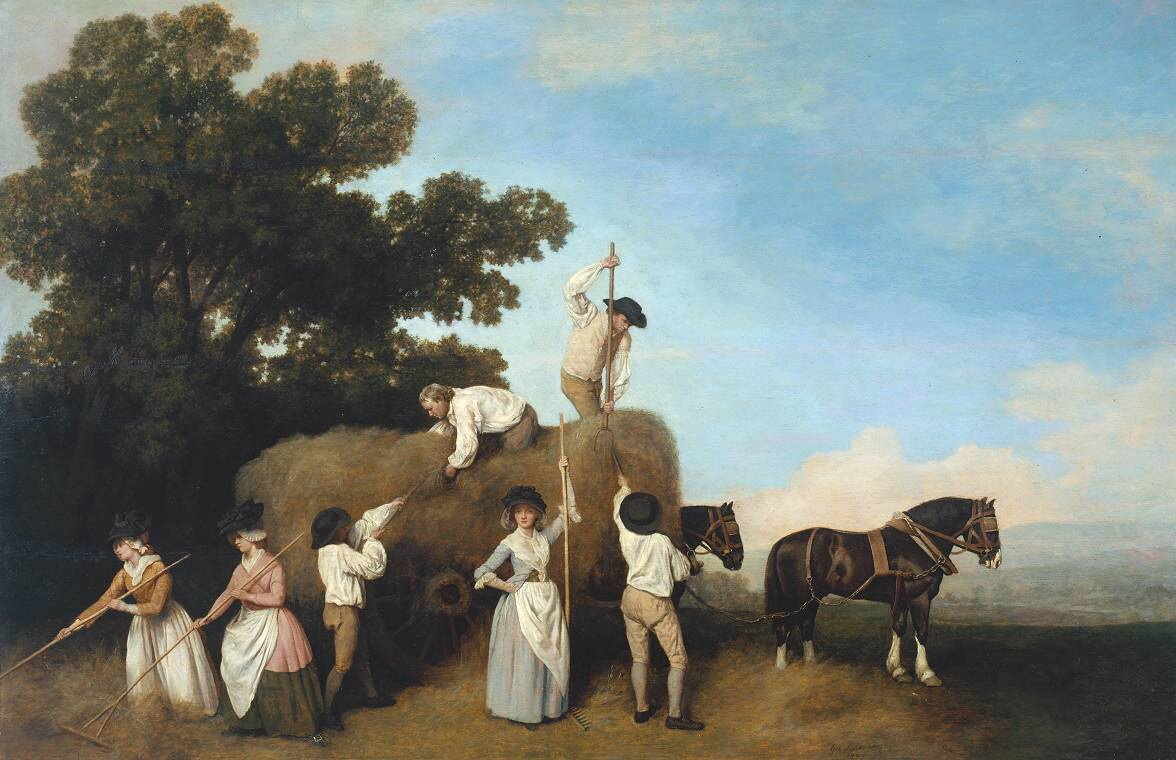
Haymakers (1785), oil on panel, 89.5 x 132.5 cm., Tate Britain

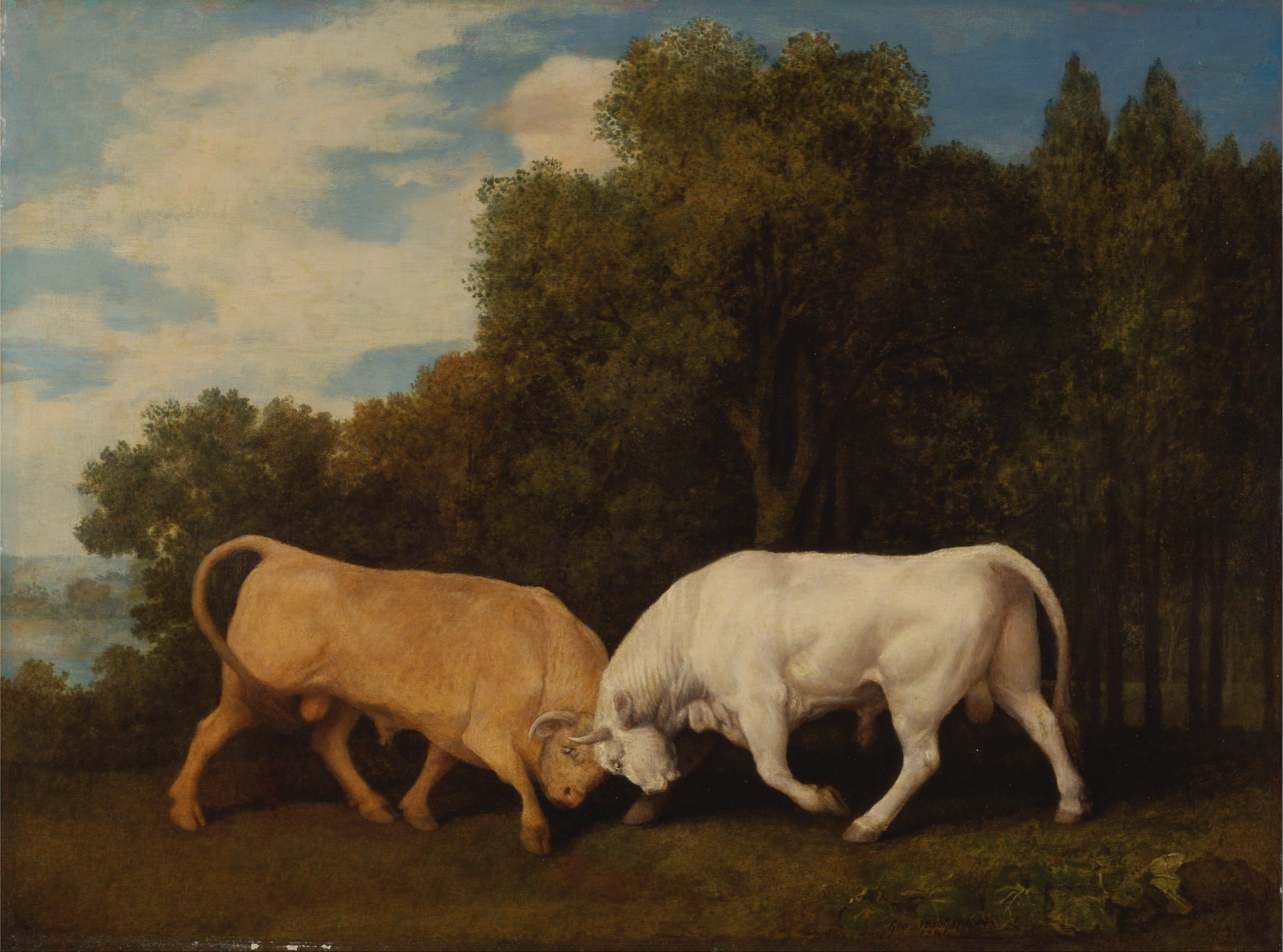
Bulls Fighting (1786), oil on panel, 61.6 x 82.6 cm., Yale Center for British Art

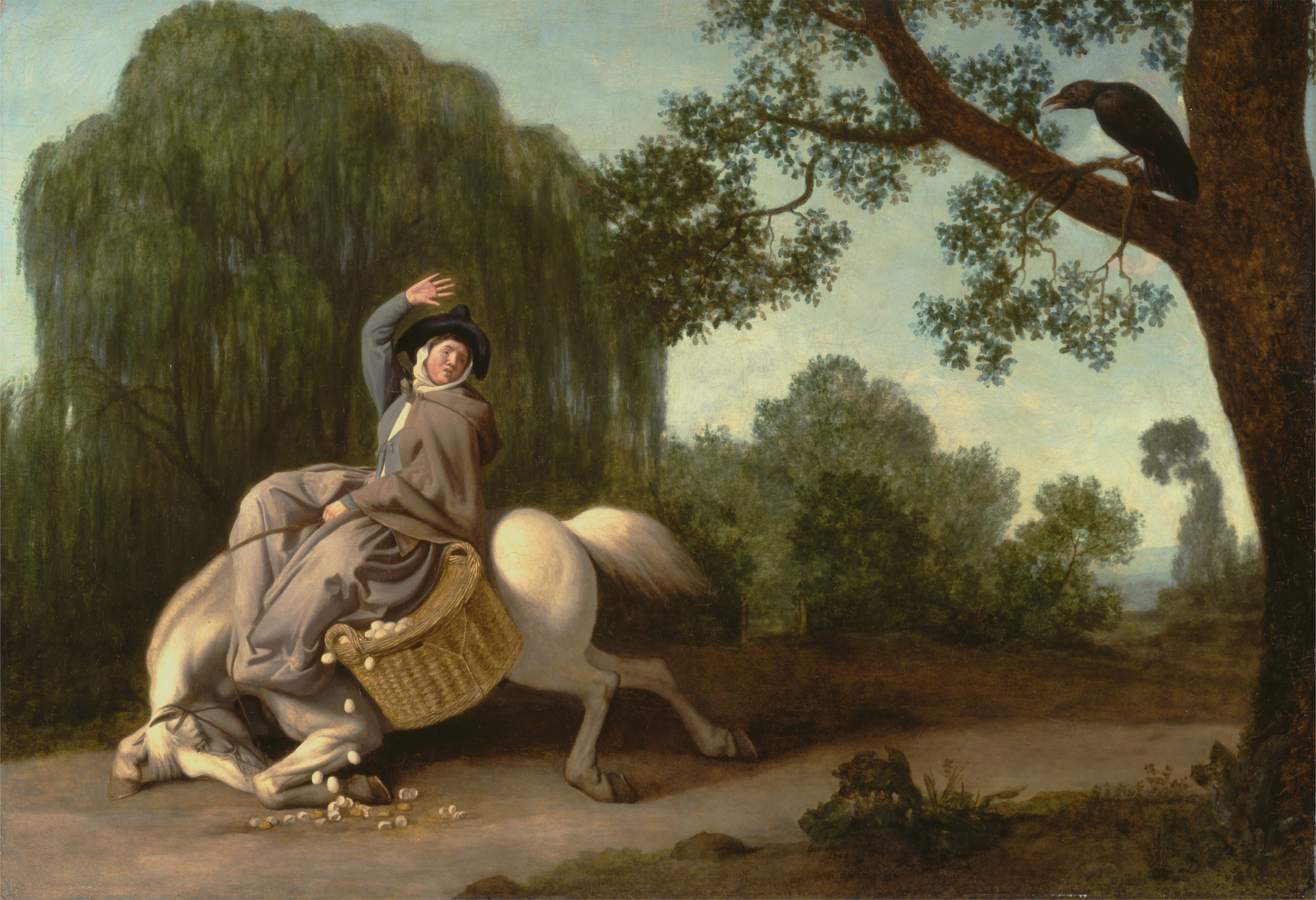
The Farmer's Wife and the Raven (1786), oil on millboard, 67.3 x 97.8 cm., Yale Center for British Art

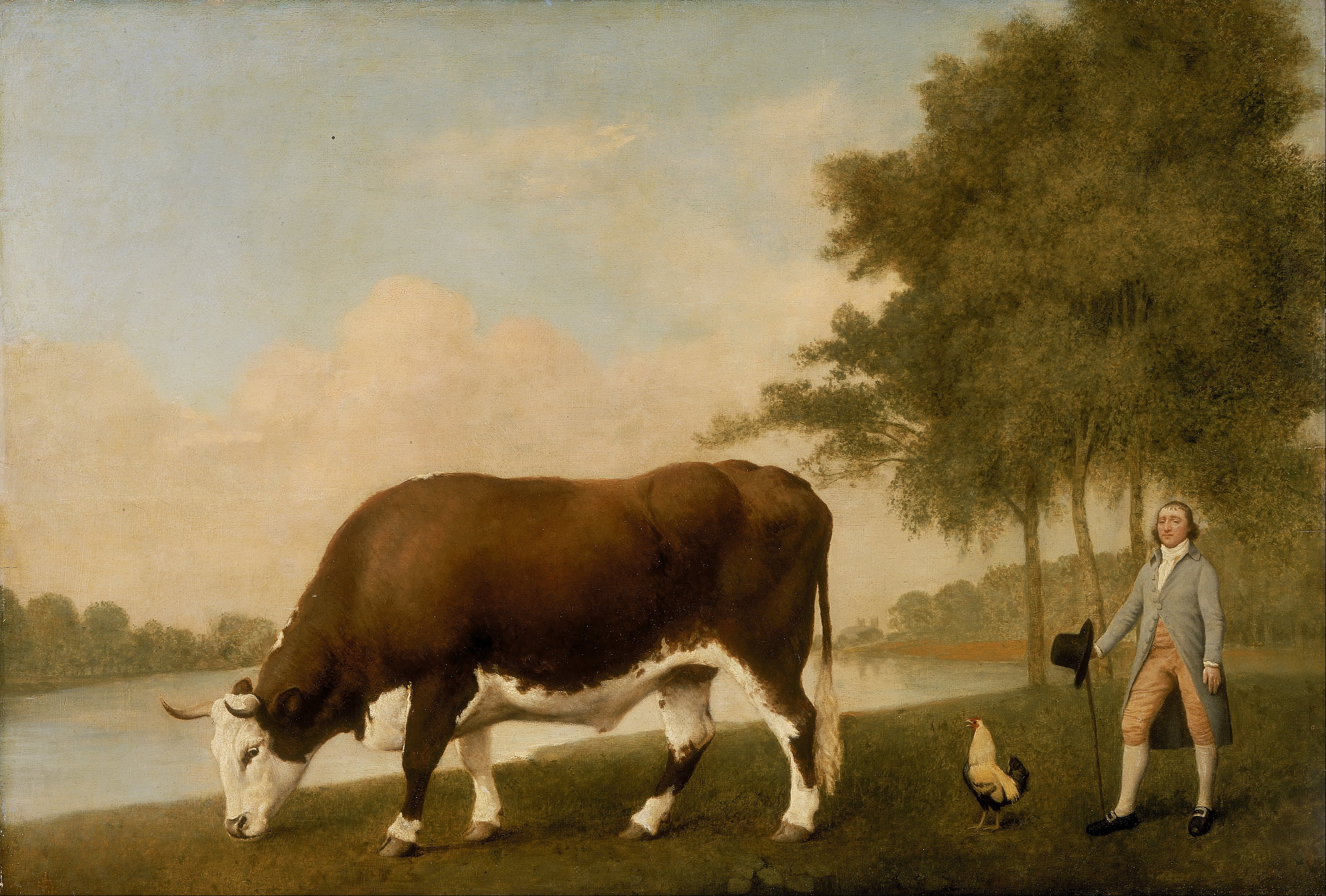
The Lincolnshire Ox (1790)

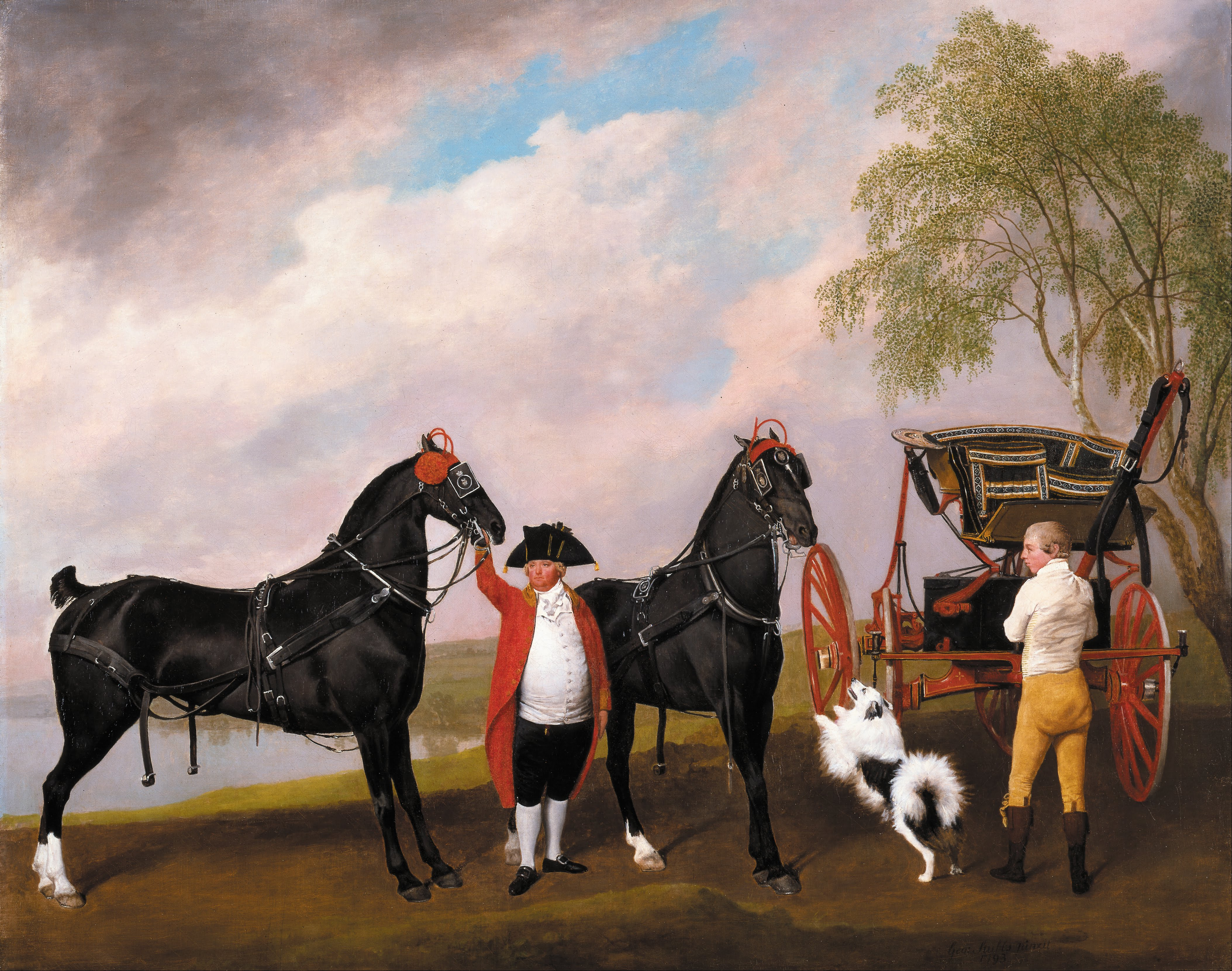
The Prince of Wales's Phaeton (1793), oil on canvas, 102 x 128 cm, Royal Collection

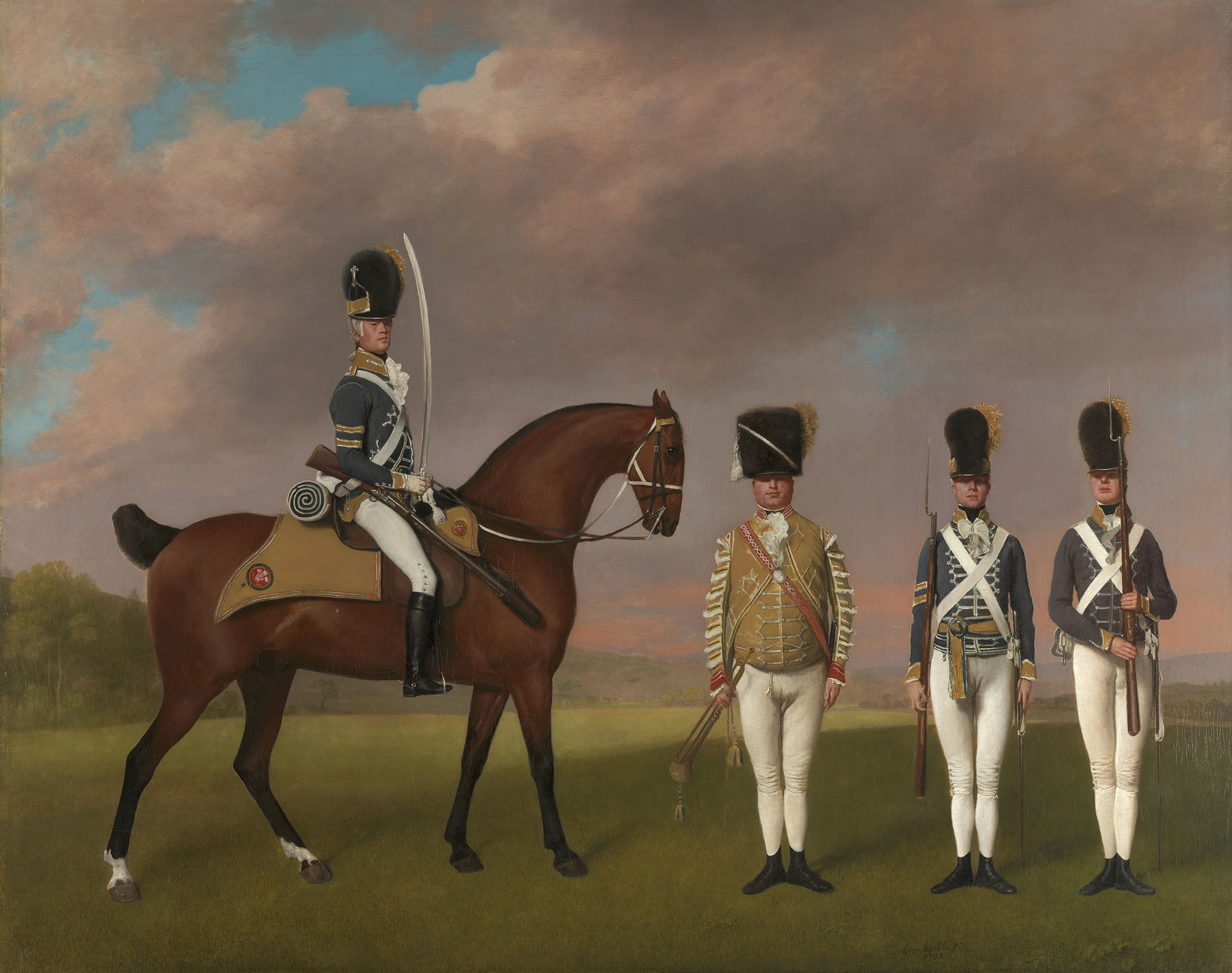
Soldiers of the 10th Light Dragoons (1793), oil on canvas, 102 x 128 cm., Royal Collection

=== Horses ===
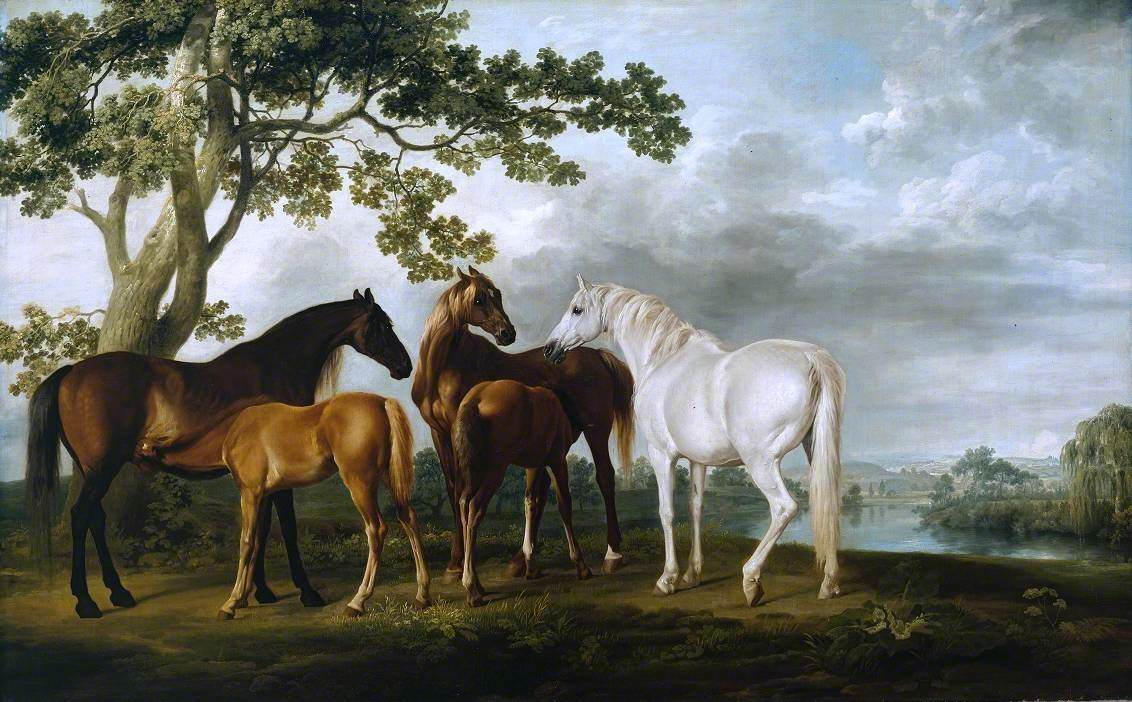
Mares and Foals in a Landscape (1763–68), oil on canvas, 102 x 162 cm., Tate Britain

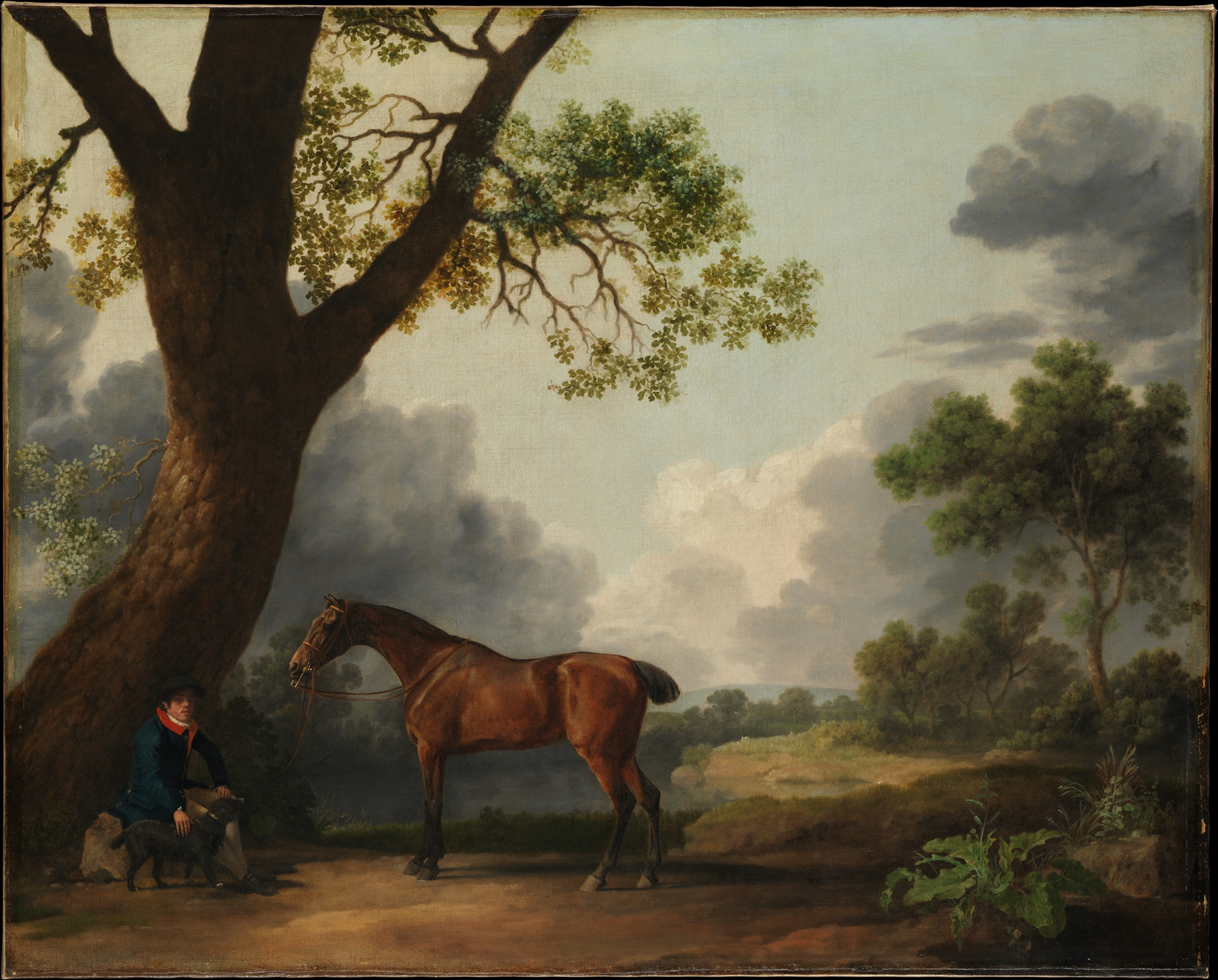
The Third Duke of Dorset's Hunter with a Groom and a Dog (1768), oil on canvas, 101.6 x 126.4 cm., Metropolitan Museum of Art

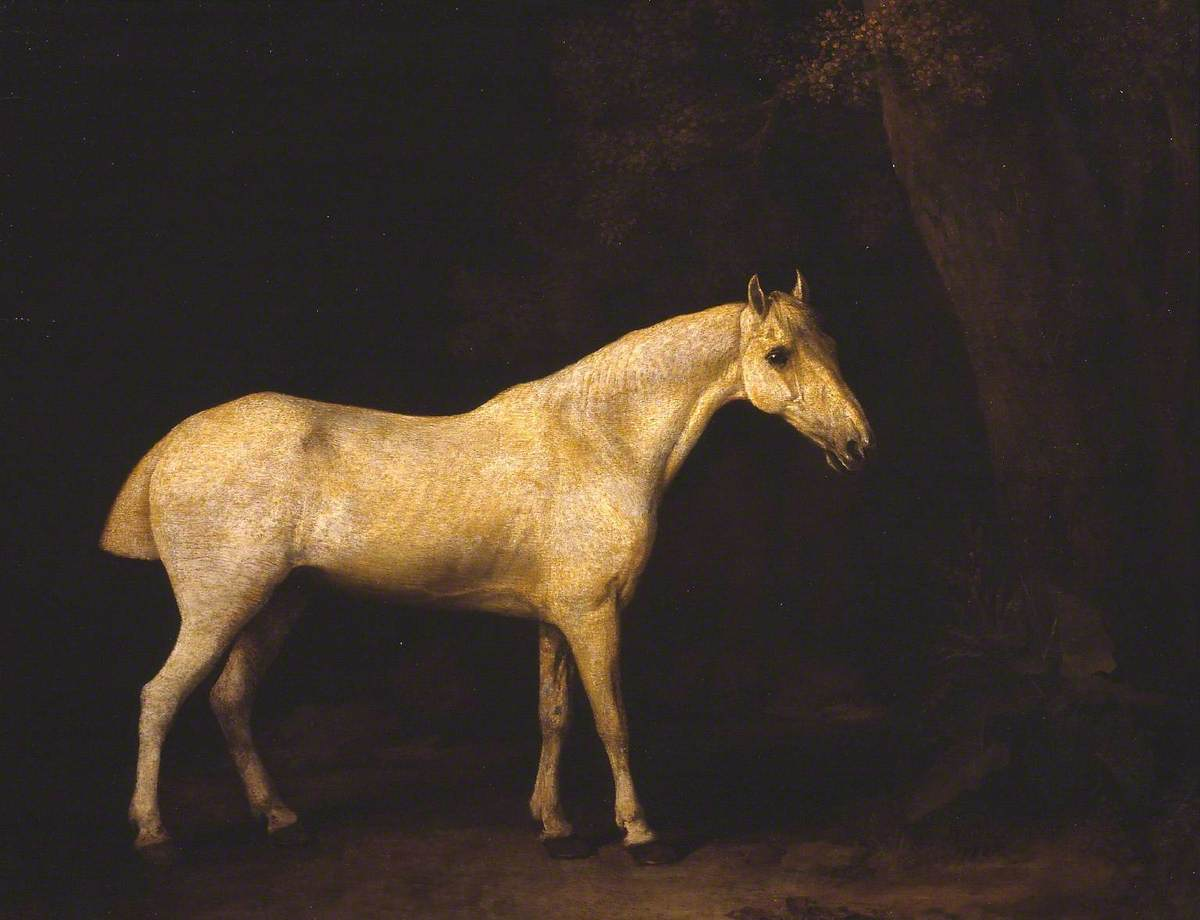
Horse in the Shade of a Wood (1780). 76.2 x 59.7 cm., Tate Britain/National Gallery

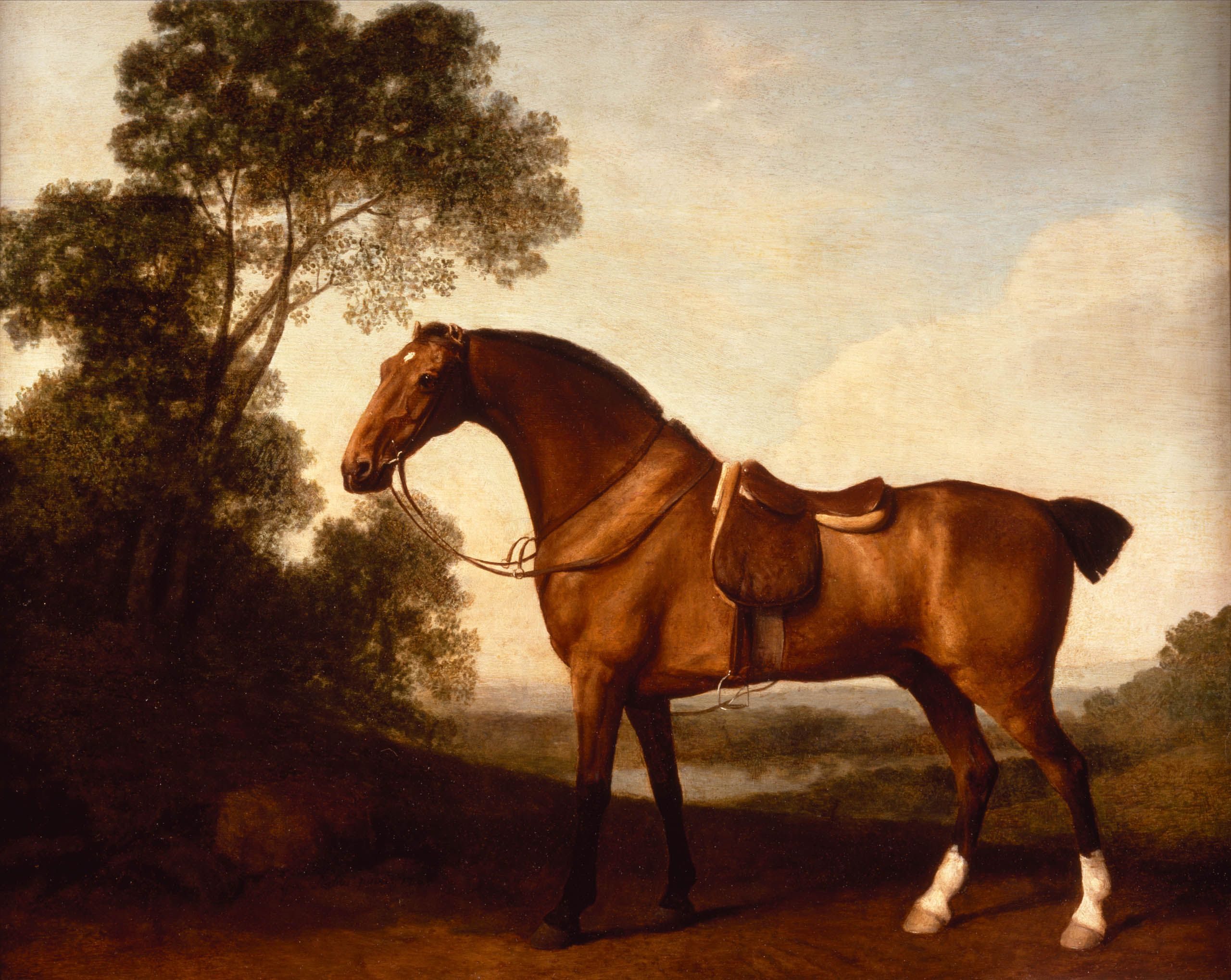
A Saddled Bay Hunter (1786), oil on panel, 48.2 x 57.7 cm., Denver Art Museum

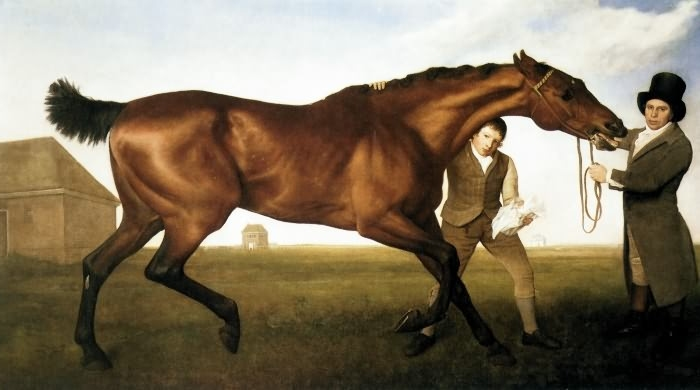
Hambletonian, Rubbing Down (1800), oil on canvas, 209 x 367.3 cm., National Trust, Mount Stewart

=== Dogs ===
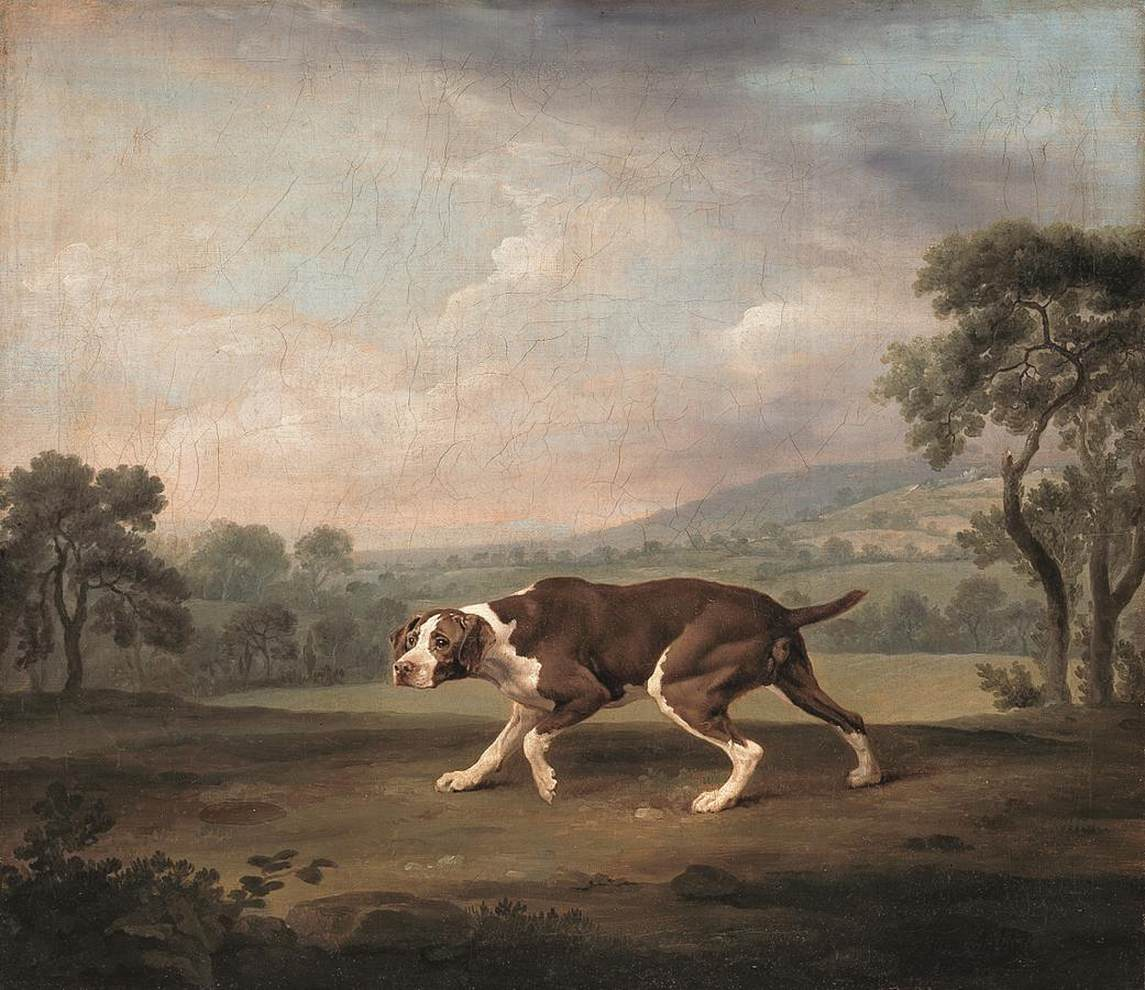
The Pointer (ca. 1766), oil on canvas, 61 x 70 cm., Neue Pinakothek

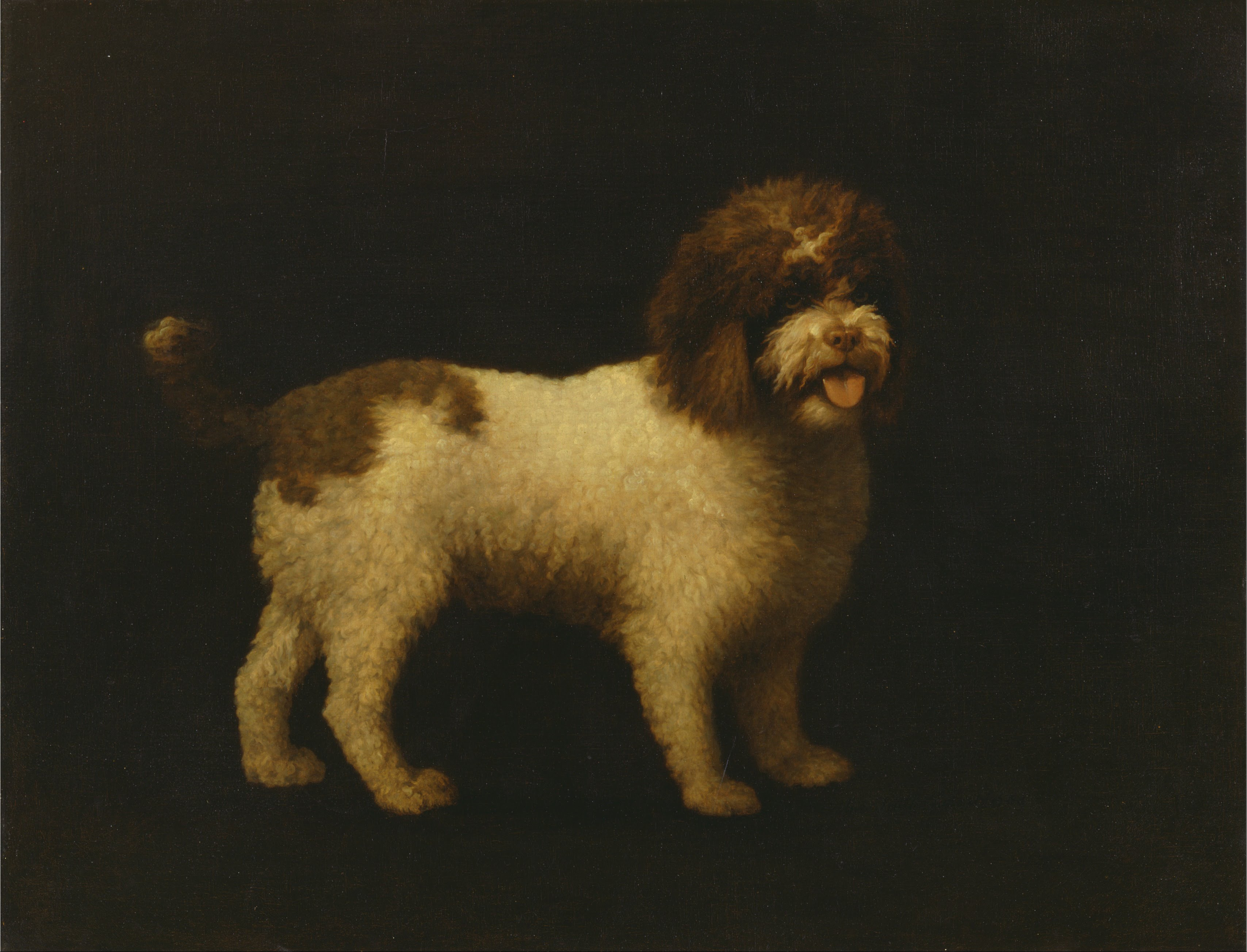
Water Spaniel (1769), oil on canvas, 90.2 x 116.8 cm., Yale Center for British Art

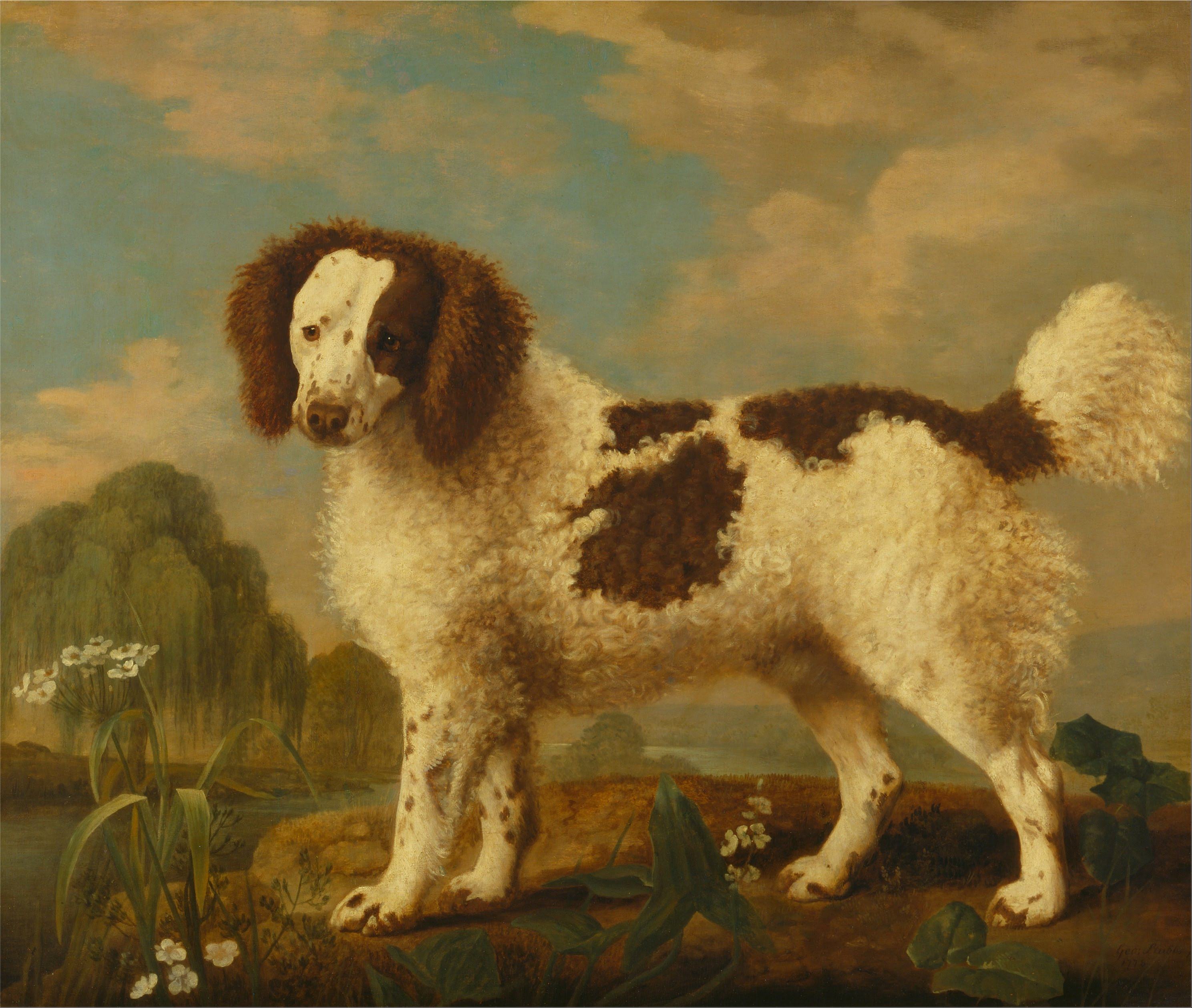
Brown and White Norfolk or Water Spaniel (1778), oil on panel, 80.6 x 97.2 cm., Yale Center for British Art

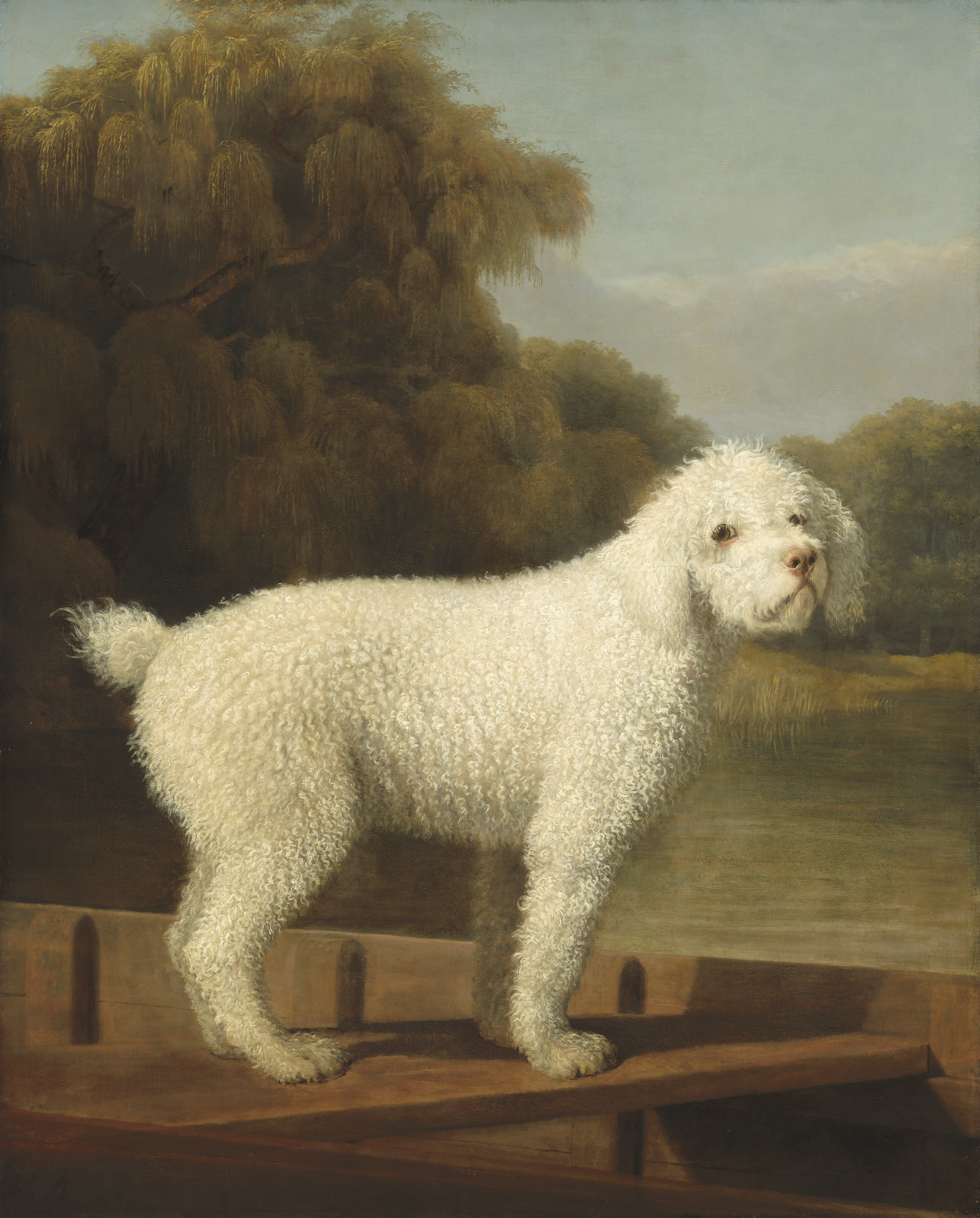
White Poodle in a Punt (ca. 1780), oil on canvas, 127 x 101.5 cm., National Gallery of Art

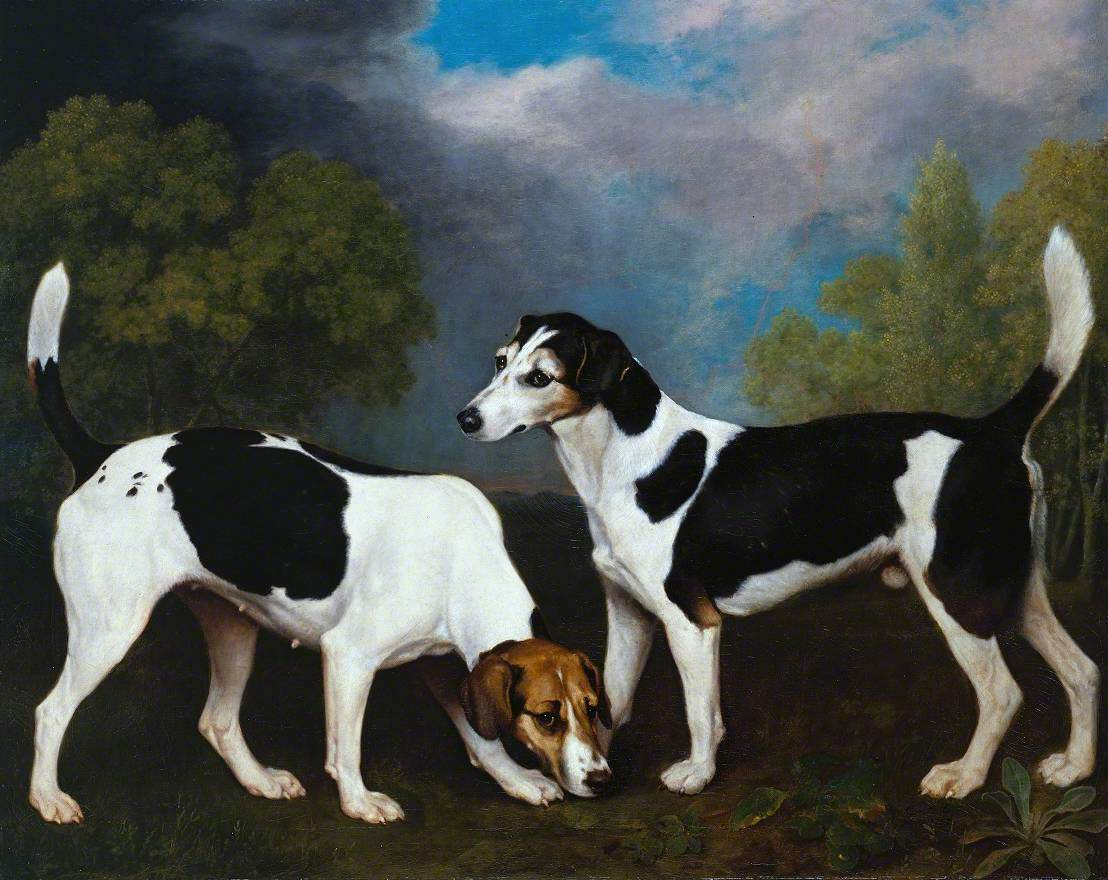
A Couple of Foxhounds (1792), oil on canvas, 127 x 101.6 cm., Tate Britain

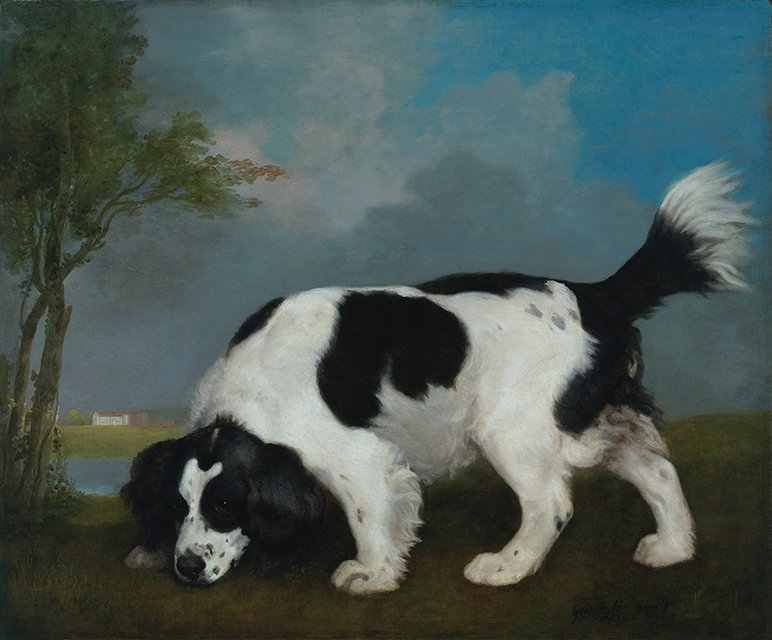
Black and White Spaniel Following a Scent (1793), oil on canvas, 25 x 30 in., Virginia Museum of Fine Arts

=== Exotic wildlife ===
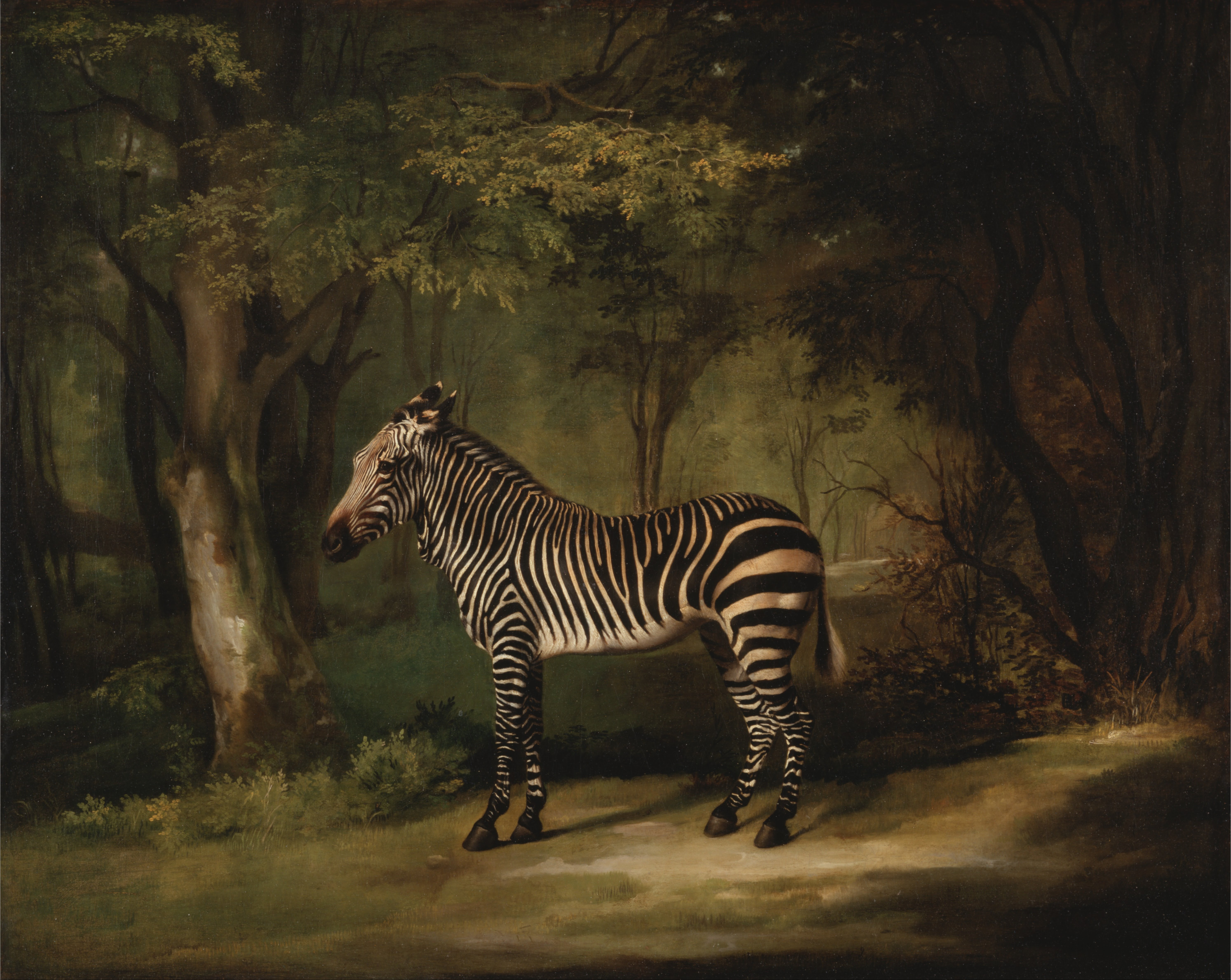
Zebra (1763), oil on canvas, 102.9 x 127.6 cm., Yale Center for British Art

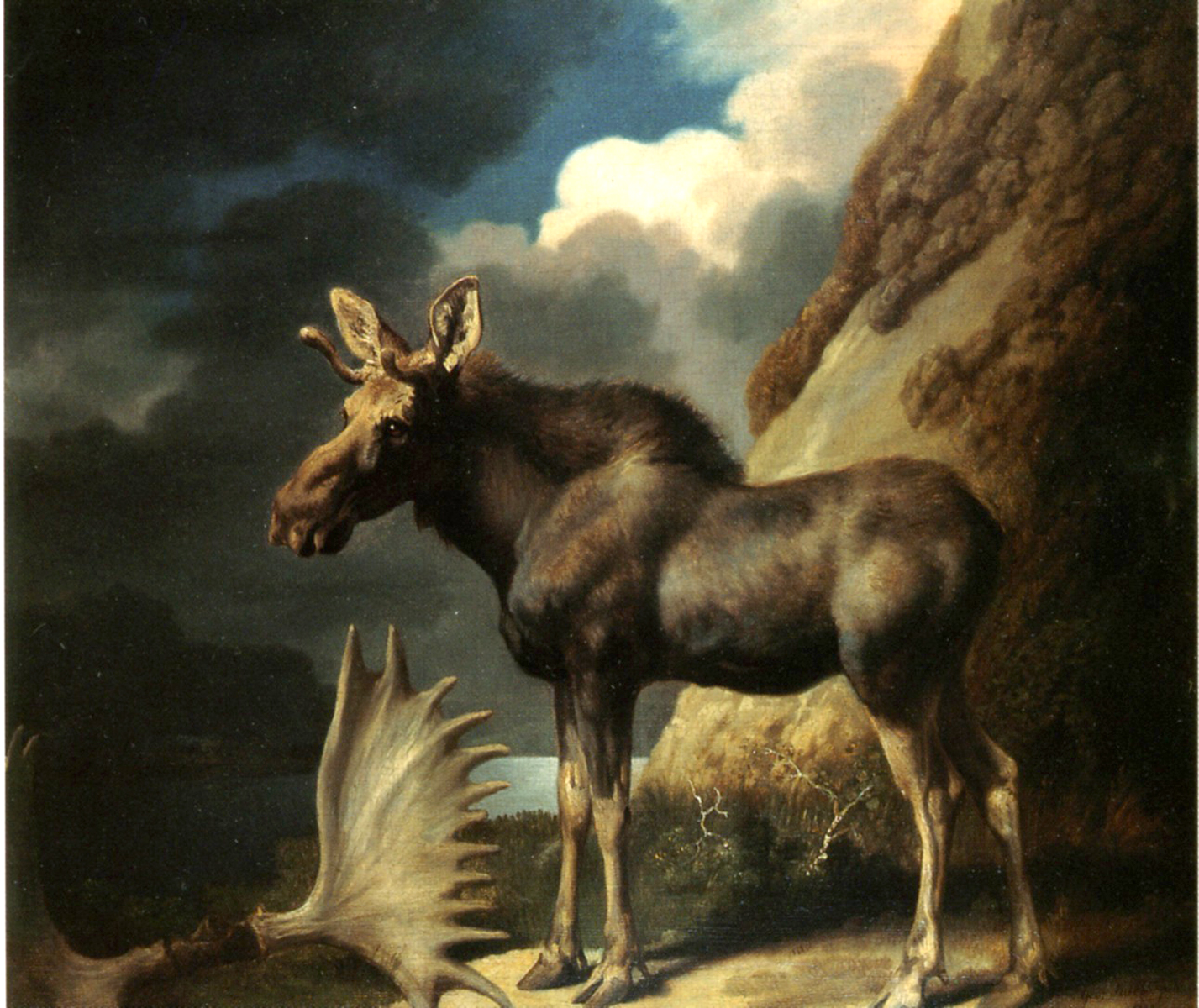
The Moose (1770), oil on canvas, 61 x 70.5 cm., Hunterian Art Gallery

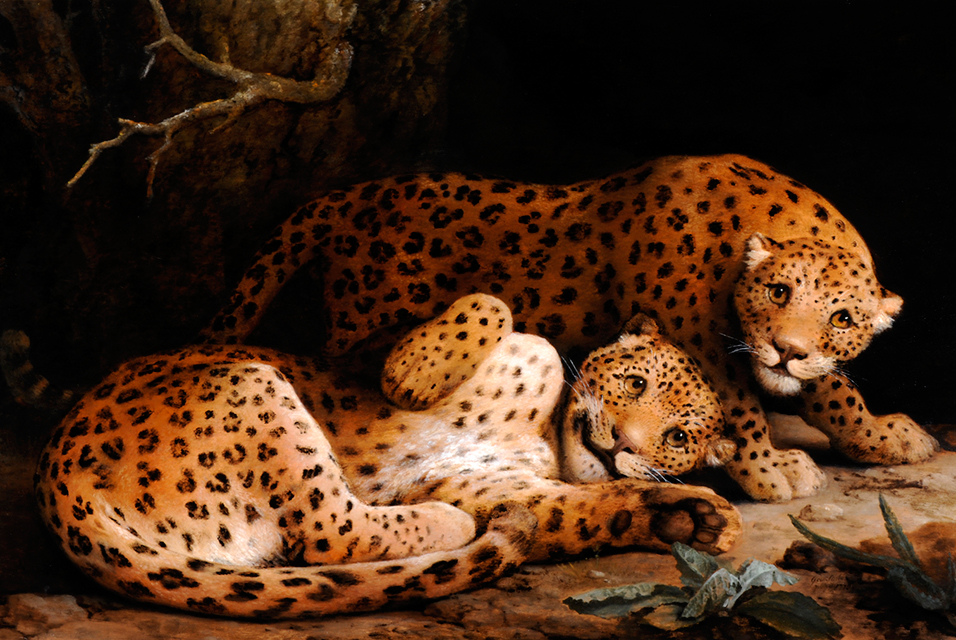
Two Leopards (c. 1776), oil on panel, 90.5 x 137.4 cm., private collection

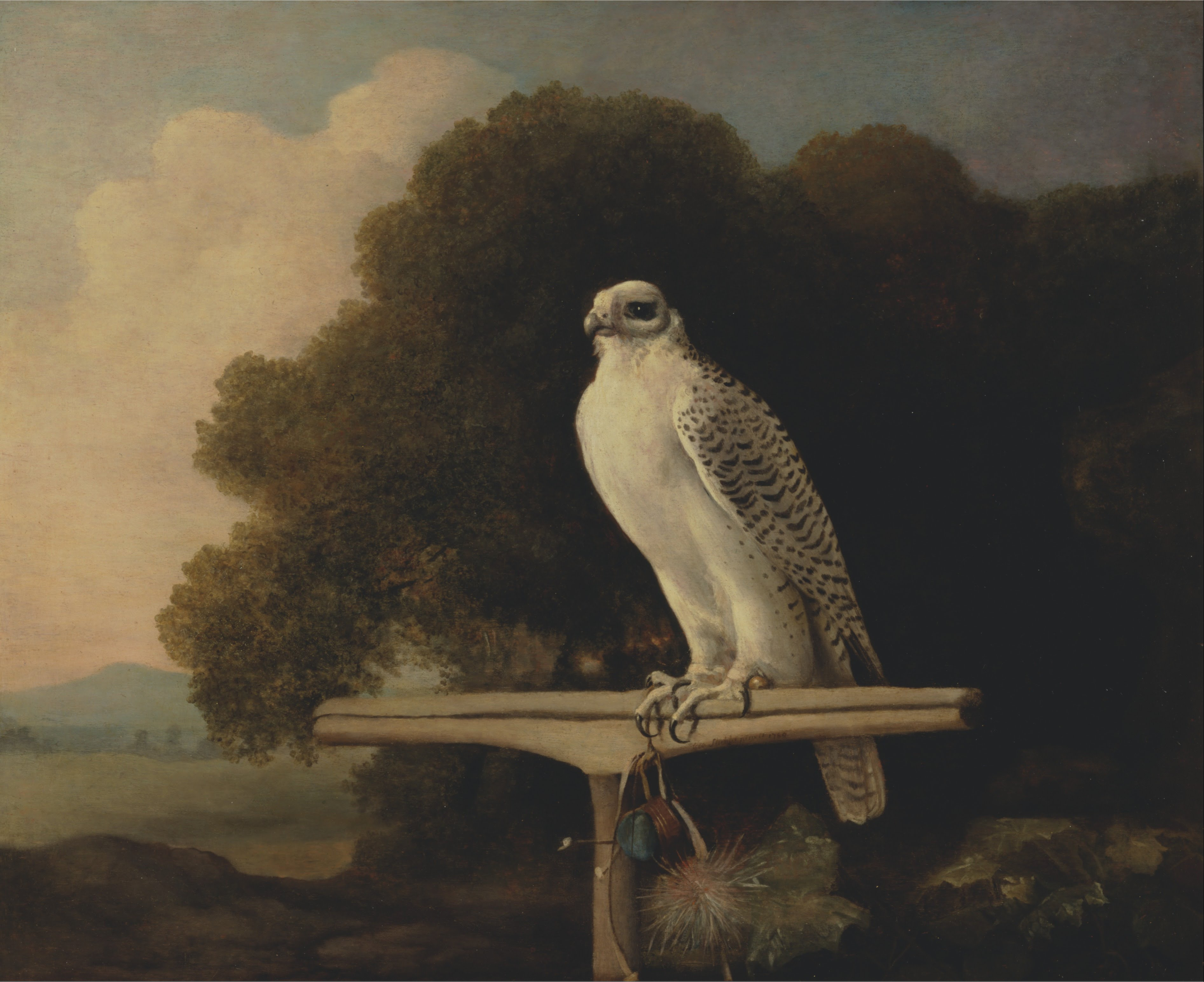
Greenland Falcon (1780), oil on panel, 81.3 x 99.1 cm., Yale Center for British Art

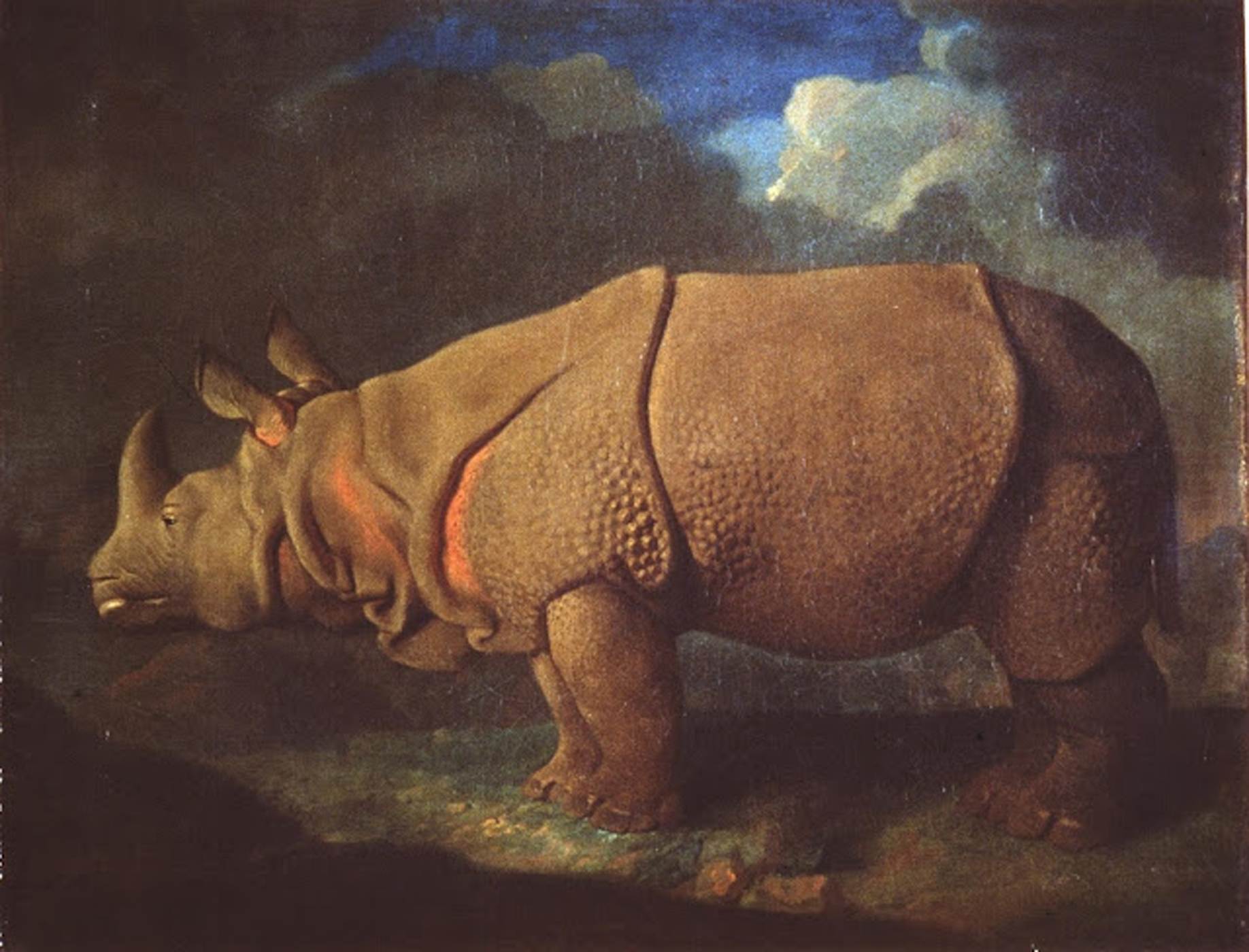
Rhinoceros (ca. 1780–91), oil on canvas, 69.9 x 92.7 cm., private collection

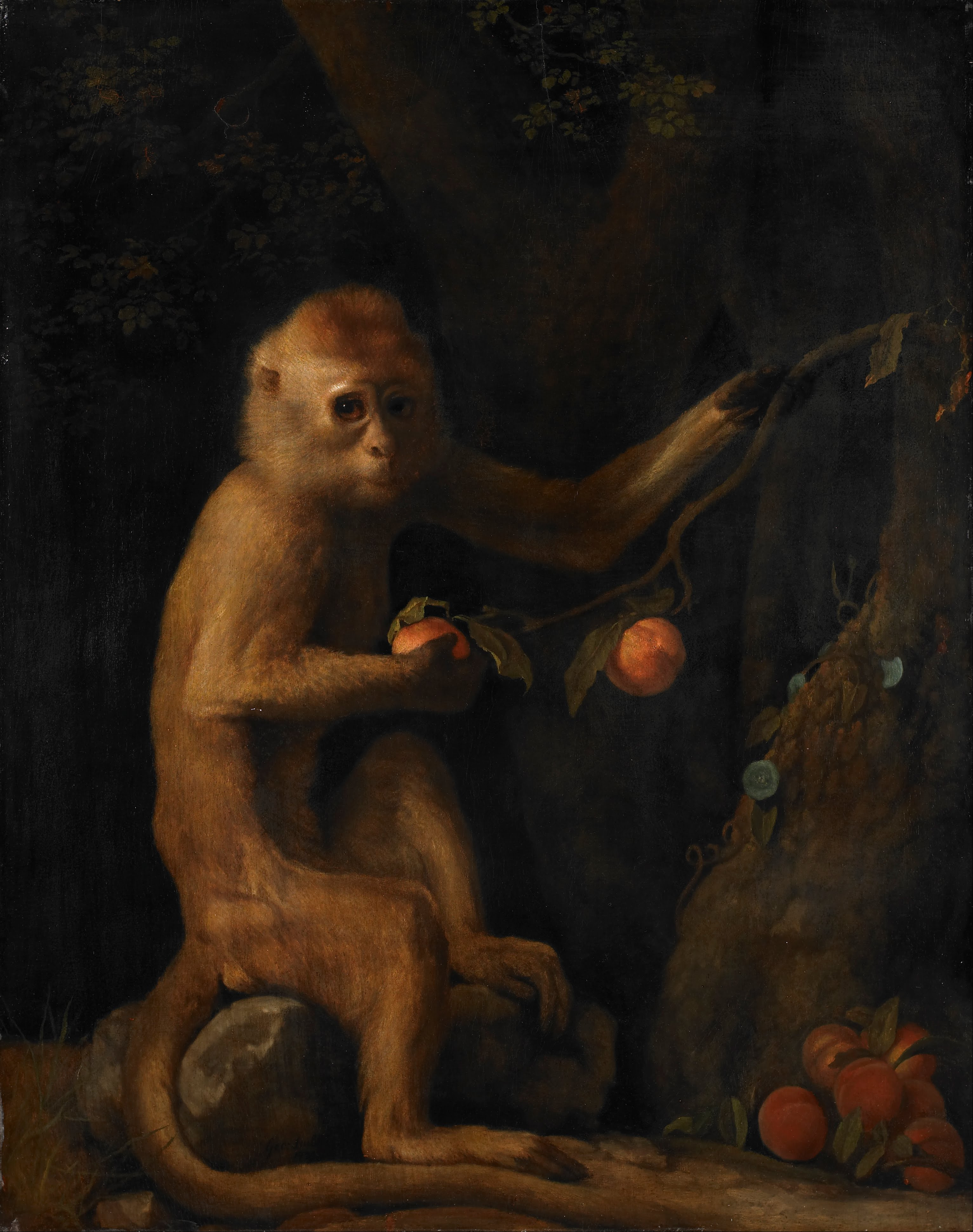
The Monkey (1799), oil on canvas, 70 x 55.9 cm., Walker Art Gallery

== List of selected artworks ==
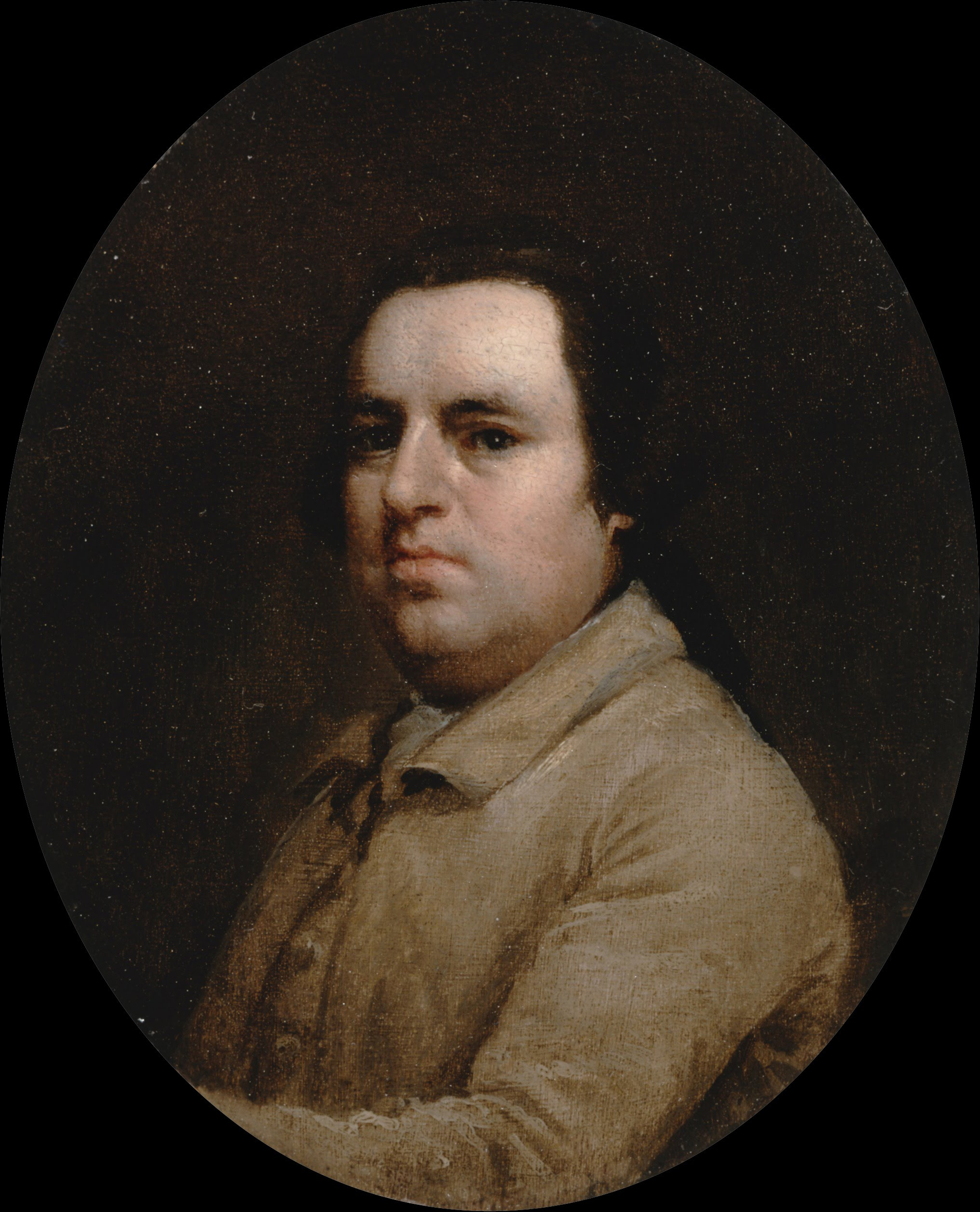
Self-Portrait (ca. 1759) oil on copper, 14 x 10.8 cm., Yale Center for British Art

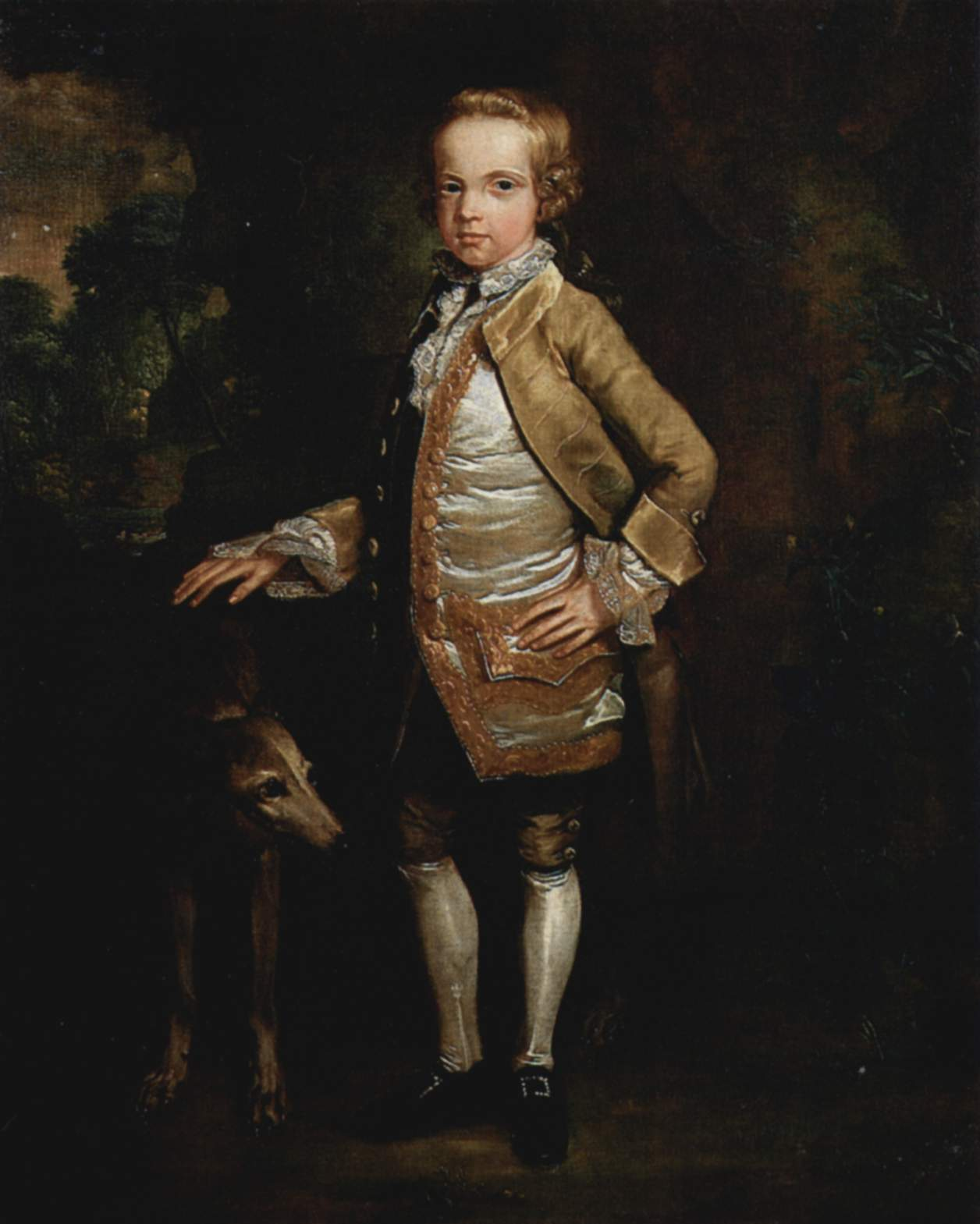
Sir John Nelthorpe, 6th Baronet (ca. 1765–75), oil on canvas, 127 x 101.5 cm. private collection

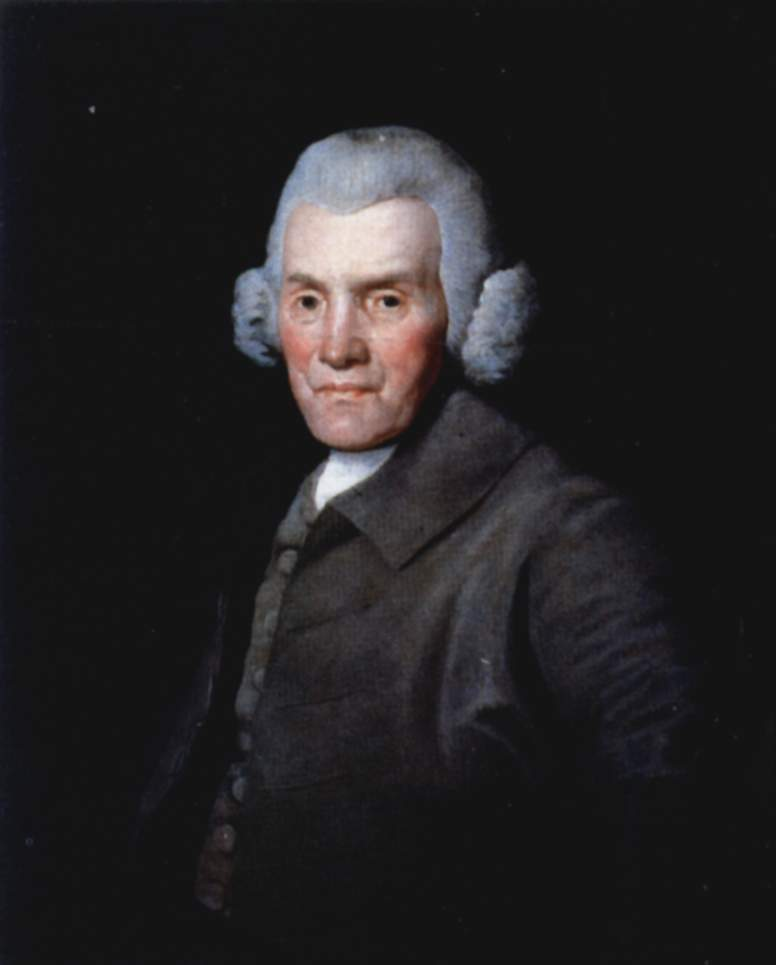
Richard Wedgewood (ca. 1765–75), oil on canvas, Wedgewood Museum

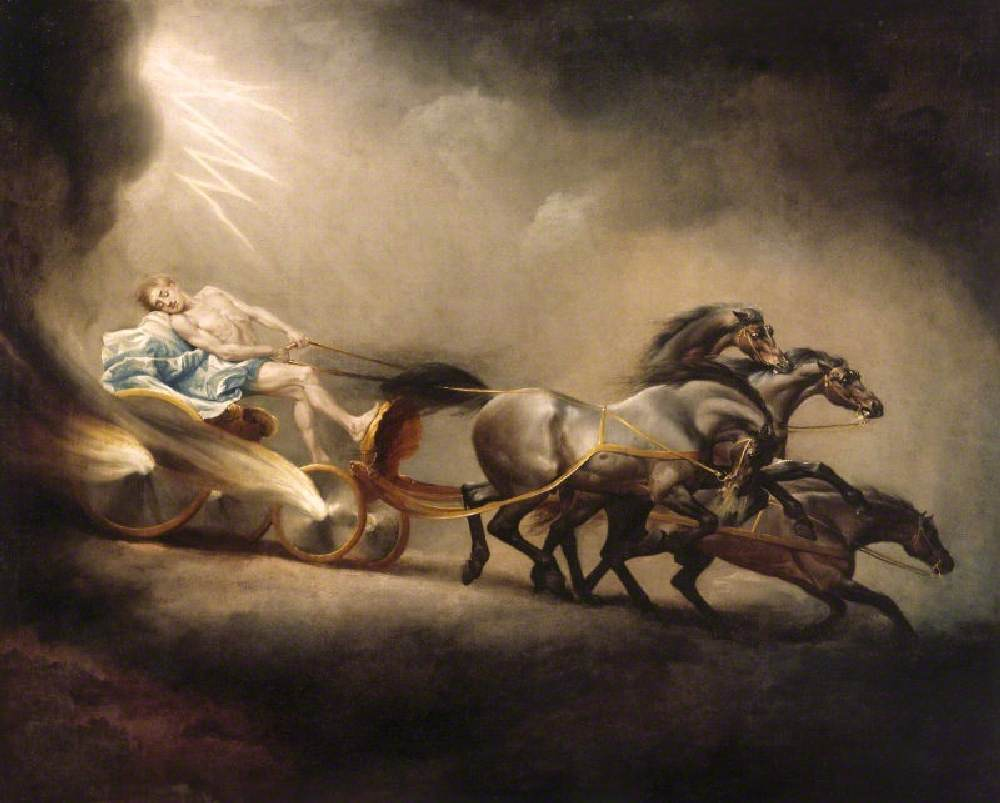
The Fall of Phaëton (1777), oil on canvas, 96.5 x 122 cm., National Trust

In the Yale Center for British Art

- Self-Portrait (1759)
- The Countess of Coningsby in the Costume of the Charlton Hunt (c. 1760)
- Lustre, held by a Groom (c. 1762)
- Newmarket Heath, with the King's stables rubbing house at the finish of the Beacon Course (c. 1765)
- Turf, with Jockey up, at Newmarket (c. 1766)
- A Lion Attacking a Horse (1762)
- Two Gentlemen Going a Shooting, with a View of Creswell Crags, Taken on the Spot (c. 1767)
- Two Gentlemen Going a Shooting (c. 1768)
- Two Gentlemen Shooting (c. 1769)
- A Repose after Shooting (1770)
- Zebra (exhibited 1763)
- Pumpkin with a Stable-lad (c. 1774)
- Sleeping Leopard (1777)
- Brown and White Norfolk or Water Spanield (c. 1778)
- Greenland Falcon (c. 1780)
- Phaeton with a Pair of Cream Ponies and a Stable-Lad (between 1780 and 1784)
- Labourers (1781)
- Bulls Fighting (c. 1786)
- The Farmer's Wife and the Raven (1786)
- Reapers (1795)
- Freeman, the Earl of Clarendon's gamekeeper, with a dying doe and hound (1800)
- A Comparative Anatomical Exposition of the Human Body with that of a Tiger and a Common Fowl (1795–1806)

In the Tate Gallery

- A Grey Hunter with Groom and a Greyhound at Creswell Crags (c.1762)
- Horse Devoured by a Lion (exhibited 1763)
- Horse Frightened by a Lion (exhibited 1763)
- Mares and Foals in a River Landscape (c.1763‑1768)
- Newmarket Heath, with a Rubbing-Down House (c.1765)
- Otho, with John Larkin up (1768)
- Horse Attacked by a Lion (1769)
- Mother and Child (1774)
- Horse in the Shade of a Wood (1780)
- Leopards at Play (1780)
- Portrait of a Young Gentleman Out Shooting (1781)
- Haymakers (1785)
- Reapers (1785)
- Bay Hunter by a Lake (1787)
- A Foxhound published (1788)
- A Foxhound Viewed from Behind published (1788)
- A Horse Attacked by a Lion (A Lion Devouring a Horse) (published 1788)
- A Lion Resting on a Rock published (1788)

In the Royal Collection

- "Pumpkin" with William South Up (c.1770)
- Sir Sidney Medows (1778)
- John Christian Santhague (1782)
- A Rough Dog (1790)
- A Bay Horse with a Groom (1791)
- John Gascoigne with a Bay Horse (1791)
- Portrait of a Gentleman (1791)
- Fino and Tiny (1791)
- Baronet with Samuel Chifney (1791)
- A Red Deer, a Buck and a Doe (1792)
- Soldiers of the 10th Light Dragoons (1793)
- William Anderson with two Saddle-Horses (1793)
- A Grey Horse (1793)
- A Grey Horse (1793)
- Laetitia, Lady Lade (1793)
- The Prince of Wales's Phaeton (1793)

In the National Museums Liverpool

- A Lion and Tiger (1779)
- A Monkey (1799)
- 'Gnawpost' and Two Other Colts (c.1793)
- Haycarting (1795)
- Haymakers (1794)
- Horse and Lioness (1775–1800)
- Horse Frightened by a Lion
- James Stanley (1755)
- 'Molly Long-Legs' with Her Jockey
- Self Portrait on a White Hunter (1782)
- The Farmer's Wife and the Raven (1782)

In the National Gallery, London

- Whistlejacket (1762)
- A Gentleman driving a Lady in a Phaeton (1787)
- The Milbanke and Melbourne Families (c.1769)

In the National Maritime Museum, Greenwich

- The Kongouro from New Holland (1772)
- Portrait of a Large Dog (1772)

Hunterian Museum and Art Gallery, University of Glasgow

- The Moose (1770)
- The Nilgai (1769)
- A Blackbuck (1770–1780)

Hunterian Museum (London)

- The Yak of Tartary (1791)
- Rhinoceros (1790–1792)
- Drill and Albino Baboon (before 1789)

British Sporting Art Trust

- A Pointer (a pair)
- A Spaniel (a pair)
- Lord Clanbrassil with Hunter Mowbrary (1769)
- Fighting Stallions (1791)

National Trust

- British racehorse "Hambletonian"

National Gallery of Art, Washington

- Captain Samuel Sharpe Pocklington with His Wife, Pleasance, and possibly His Sister, Frances (1769)
- White Poodle in a Punt (c. 1780)

Victoria and Albert Museum

- Goose with Outspread Wings
- Lions and a Lioness with a Rocky Background (1776)

Portland Collection

- The 3rd Duke of Portland on horseback at Welbeck Abbey
- William Henry Cavendish-Bentinck, 3rd Duke of Portland and his younger brother Lord Edward

== See also ==
- Animal art
- English school of painting
