= Uriel Lynn =

Israeli lawyer and politician

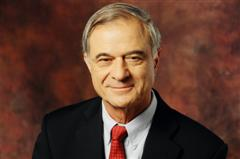

Faction represented in the Knesset
- 1984–1992: Likud

Personal details
- Born: 2 April 1935 (age 91) Jerusalem, Mandatory Palestine

Uriel Lynn (Hebrew: אוריאל לין; born 2 April 1935) is an attorney and the President of the Tel Aviv and Central Israel Chamber of Commerce, as well as the President of the Federation of Israeli Chambers of Commerce. He previously served as a member of the Knesset (the Israeli Parliament), the Director of the Israeli-North American Investment Authority, the Director of State Revenue, the Director-General of the Israeli Ministry of Energy and Infrastructure, and the Chairperson of the Executive Council of the Israel National Road Safety Authority. Lynn is also actively involved in matters related to Israeli business and public policy. Additionally, he formerly served as a board member of several public companies and as an arbitrator in various domestic and international arbitrations.

== Biography ==
Lynn was born Uriel Assoulin in the Old City of Jerusalem to Yehonatan Assoulin, who immigrated to Israel from Morocco, and Margalit Chazan, who was born in Israel. His maternal grandfather, Rabbi Ben-Zion Mordechai Chazan, was one of the founders and gabbai (sexton) of the Porat Yosef Yeshiva in Jerusalem, and officially handed over the Old City of Jerusalem. He was also the person chosen to deliver the Old City's Jewish Quarter's instrument of surrender to Transjordanian Legion Commander and Military Governor of the Old City of Jerusalem, Abdullah Tal, on 28 May 1948, during the Israeli War of Independence.

Lynn was educated at a secular institution for army children in Bnei Brak, followed by the Meir Shfeya and Ben Shemen Youth Villages. Before his mandatory military service, he also studied at the Haifa Marine School (now known as the Israel Nautical College in Akko). At the age of 17, he enlisted in the IDF, serving in the 7th Armored Brigade of the Israel Defense Forces, and was honorably discharged from mandatory service in 1954. He later participated in three wars as a member of the IDF Reserves: the Sinai War of 1956, the Six-Day War of 1967, and the Yom Kippur War of 1973.

Lynn studied law at the Hebrew University of Jerusalem from 1956 to 1958, and was awarded a Master of Laws (LL.M.) degree summa cum laude. He later continued his legal studies at the University of California, Berkeley, from 1961 to 1963, earning an additional Master of Laws degree.

Upon completing his studies at UC Berkeley, Lynn served as the Director of West Coast Operations for the Jewish National Fund's fundraising organization. After returning to Israel, he practiced law, initially specializing in road traffic accident cases. He later transitioned to the private business sector, serving as General Counsel and company secretary ATA Textiles Ltd., as well as a Director of the Jerusalem Jersey textile company.

Lynn served as a board member of several public and state-owned companies, including the Israel Electric Corporation, Israel Chemicals Ltd., Israel Petrochemical Enterprises Ltd., Gadot Biochemical Industries Ltd., and ZIM. He also served as the board chair of Naphtha Israel Petroleum Corporation Ltd.

In addition, since 1972, Lynn has been publishing articles in all major Israeli press outlets on topics related to economics, social affairs, and the law.

== Beginning of involvement in public affairs ==
Lynn joined the Israeli Liberal Party in 1973, and was elected a member of its National Executive Body two years later. Following the political upheaval of 1977, Finance Minister Simcha Erlich appointed him as the Ministry of Finance's representative and director of the Israeli-North American Investment Authority. Lynn reorganized the Authority's operations, setting its primary objective as attracting American companies—particularly high-tech firms—to the Israeli market. During his tenure, National Semiconductor, for example, decided to establish a production plant in Herzliya. Additionally, Lynn played a key role in assisting Elron Electronic Industries Ltd., an Israeli high-tech company, in securing its first significant fundraising campaign. In 1979, Lynn returned to Israel and was appointed Director of State Revenue.

== Director of State Revenue ==
As Director of State Revenue, Lynn was responsible for overseeing the Ministry of Finance's Income tax, Customs, and VAT Divisions. During his three-and-a-half-year tenure, he aimed to simplify Israel's tax system and improve its efficiency to encourage the payment of fair and accurate taxes. His initiatives led to the cancellation or reduction of 11 taxes, including:

- An exemption from land appreciation tax on the sale of residential apartments (provided no more than one such sale occurred within a four-year period).
- The cancellation of property tax for all types of structures, including residential, industrial, commercial, and service-related buildings.
- The elimination of estate tax.
- A reduction in purchase tax for durable household goods such as ovens, refrigerators, washing machines, televisions, and small vehicles.
- A reduction in purchase taxes for raw materials and consumer goods.
- A reduction in employer loan taxes.
- A reduction in service purchase tax.
- A reduction in employer tax in the industrial, tourism, and agricultural sectors.
- The cancellation of business tax.

Additionally Lynn opposed government efforts to reinstate the travel tax, which was only reintroduced after his tenure ended.

He also unified and simplified the tax law enforcement system and expanded the use of the tax deduction at source methodology.

== Activities at the Israeli Ministry of Energy and Infrastructure ==
Lynn was appointed Director-General of the Ministry of Energy and Infrastructure in 1982 and served in this role until the elections for the 11th Knesset in July 1984. Between 1982 and 1984, Israel faced significant challenges in procuring crude oil, relying solely on high-cost supplies from Egypt and Mexico. As Director-General, Lynn played a key role in shaping a policy that promoted the construction of coal-fired power plants—a policy later adopted by the Israel Electric Corporation. He also spearheaded the rapid transition of power plants from fuel-oil-based to coal-based electricity generation, a more cost-effective and readily available energy source. As a result, Israel's three 350 MW power plants were converted to coal-fired operations, and the Hadera Marine Coal Port was constructed to receive coal shipments directly from the pier without causing environmental pollution.

Additionally, the Ministry invested in the development of alternative energy sources. One notable initiative was a government grant awarded to the Bronicki family for the development of solar ponds in the Jericho region, contributing to the growth of the Ormat company and advancing solar and biomass energy projects.

Within two months of his appointment, Lynn implemented a transition to a new Load/Time-based tariff structure, also known as TAOZ, for the Israel Electric Corporation. This new system was designed to balance the national electric grid's load, encourage electricity consumption during off-peak hours, and discourage usage during peak-load periods. Lynn also worked closely with Minister of Energy and Infrastructure Yitzhak Moda'i to introduce competition among the major fuel companies, which had previously operated under a pre-determined market segmentation system and a pricing formula dictated by the Ministries of Finance and Energy.

During his tenure as Director-General, Lynn was also involved in the decision to halt the Red Sea–Dead Sea Water Conveyance project (also known as the Two-Seas Canal project) due to its marginal contribution to the national electric grid. He was also involved in discussions regarding the potential development of an Israeli nuclear-powered electricity plant.

In 1983, Lynn decided to run for Mayor of Haifa, prompting the government to consider an amendment allowing him to do so. However, after realizing that he would not secure sufficient support from his colleagues in the Liberal Party, he withdrew from the race and remained in his role as Director-General.

== Activities in the Knesset ==
Lynn was elected to the 11th Knesset as part of the Liberal wing of the Likud parliamentary group and began his tenure as a Member of Knesset in 1984. During his time in the Knesset, he served as a member of the Economic Affairs Committee and the Constitution, Law, and Justice Committee. He also held leadership roles as Chair of the Road Safety Committee and Chair of the Subcommittee on Energy.

As Deputy Chairperson of the Economic Affairs Committee, Lynn played a key role in facilitating the passage of significant economic legislation, including the Antitrust Law. He was also actively involved in the deliberations and drafting of Amendment No. 4 of the Telecommunications Law (1986)—the first law regulating cable and satellite television broadcasts in Israel. This legislation, later renamed in 2002 as the Communications Law (Telecommunications and Broadcasting), laid the foundation for Israel's modern broadcasting regulations.

As an active member of the Constitution, Law, and Justice Committee, Lynn contributed to the development of numerous laws, including the Basic Law: The State Comptroller and a reformulation of sexual offense legislation.

In 1988, he was re-elected to the 12th Knesset, serving as an MK until 1992. During this period, he was appointed Chairperson of the Constitution, Law, and Justice Committee, where he spearheaded multiple legal reforms. Under his leadership, the committee passed approximately 95 new laws, nearly half of which were private bills. Many of these laws introduced constitutional changes and reforms to Israel's political system (see detailed list below).

Among other legislative achievements, Lynn led the passage of the following key laws:

- Amendment No. 37 to the Penal Law (1992): Modified the principles of self-defense in Israeli law, allowing individuals who are unlawfully attacked and at risk of harm to their life, liberty, bodily integrity, property, or dignity to defend themselves and transfer the risk to their assailant.
- Environmental Hazard Prevention Law (1992): Established regulations to prevent environmental damage and ensure accountability for environmental hazards.
- The Hague Convention (Return of Abducted Children) Law (1991): Incorporated the Hague Convention's provisions into Israeli law, facilitating the return of abducted children to their country of habitual residence.
- Abolition of Censorship on Plays (1989): Suspended the validity of the Public Play (Criticism) Ordinance, effectively eliminating state censorship of theatrical performances.
- Bail Release Law (1989) – Amendment No. 5 to the Criminal Procedure Ordinance: Streamlined the bail process, allowing suspects to be released without requiring a court appearance. Before this amendment, all suspects had to be brought before a judge before being granted bail.
- Medical confidentiality Retention Law: Eliminated the requirement for civil servants to sign a blanket waiver of medical confidentiality, protecting their personal health information.
- Amendment No. 5 to the Civil Service (Appointments) Law (1991): Before this amendment, civil servants could vote in party institutions that determined Knesset and government representatives, allowing them to accumulate political power that could be abused in their relationships with MKs and ministers. The amendment barred civil servants from participating in such elections, preventing potential conflicts of interest.
- Amendment No. 17 to the Israel Bar Association Act (1990): Allowed the establishment of independently funded law colleges, expanding legal education opportunities.
- Amendment No. 2 to the Spouses (Property Relations) Law (1990): Expanded women's rights in marital property relations, ensuring greater financial and legal protections.

=== Changing the political method ===
Following the collapse of the national unity government in March 1990 and the ensuing public outrage over the flaws in Israel's political system, Lynn spearheaded the passage of a series of reforms aimed at strengthening governance and stability. These legislative changes included:

- Raising the electoral threshold: Increased the threshold for Knesset representation from 1% to 1.5% to reduce parliamentary fragmentation and eliminate one-person factions.
- Amendment to the Basic Law: The Government: Redefined the structure and powers of the government, clarifying its relationship with the Knesset. This amendment also introduced direct elections for the prime minister, a system later repealed after three election cycles.
- Amendment to the Political Parties Law: Required any organization fielding candidates for the Knesset to register as a political party. It also legally defined political parties as separate legal entities, mandated the submission of party statutes, the establishment of party institutions, and compliance with oversight by the State Comptroller of Israel.
- Restrictions on party-switching (Kalanterism): Prevented MKs from defecting to another parliamentary faction in exchange for personal political benefits—a practice known as Kalanterism, named after Rachamim Kalanter, a Jerusalem City Council member in the 1950s who was the first to engage in such behavior. This practice became widespread during the power struggle between Likud and Labor after the 1990 government collapse, significantly eroding public trust in Israel's electoral system.
- Election integrity and governance amendments:
  - Prohibited election results from being challenged in court.
  - Prevented voters from being subjected to unfair or undue influence.
  - Mandated that every government establish a Ministerial Committee for Security Affairs.
  - Granted the prime minister the authority to dismiss a deputy minister.
  - Imposed new restrictions on civil servants' involvement in political activities.
  - Changed the vote of no-confidence procedure, requiring an absolute majority of Knesset members to dissolve the government.

These reforms strengthened political accountability and curbed instability, leaving a lasting impact on Israel's governance framework.

=== The Constitutional Revolution ===
As Chairperson of the Constitution, Law, and Justice Committee, Lynn played a central role in passing two landmark Basic Laws:

- Basic Law: Human Dignity and Liberty
- Basic Law: Freedom of Occupation.

These laws enshrine fundamental individual rights and are considered Israel's de facto Bill of rights, both in terms of their content and constitutional significance. Their passage was largely shaped by deliberations with representatives of religious parties in the committee.

Key provisions of the Basic Laws:

- Basic Law: Human Dignity and Liberty – Protects core individual freedoms, including the right to life and safety, bodily integrity, property, dignity, privacy, and more.
- Basic Law: Freedom of Occupation – Guarantees the right of every individual or legal entity to engage in any profession or trade of their choice, provided it does not harm the public interest.

Following their enactment, the Israel Supreme Court declared these laws a "constitutional revolution", effectively granting itself the authority to conduct judicial reviews of Knesset legislation concerning fundamental rights.

The extent to which the Knesset intended to grant these laws supra-legal status—and whether it foresaw the Supreme Court's broad interpretation—is a matter of ongoing debate. Some MKs who voted for the laws later claimed they had been misled by the initiators, including Lynn. A more nuanced view suggests that the laws' constitutional implications were deliberately ambiguous, and that they might have faced greater opposition had their full impact been made clearer at the time. Lynn strongly contested these claims, particularly in his book The Birth of a Revolution. He dismissed them as a "mockery of the Knesset" and an outright "disregard of both facts and truth".

== Presidency of the Federation of Israeli Chambers of Commerce ==
At the end of 2002, Lynn was elected by secret ballot as President of the Tel Aviv and Central Israel Chamber of commerce and President of the Federation of Israeli Chambers of Commerce, Israel's largest business organization. He was re-elected to both positions four times and continues to hold them today. By virtue of his role, he also served as a member of the Advisory Committee of the Bank of Israel.

Lynn expanded the Chamber's scope of activity, transforming it from the Tel Aviv-Jaffa Chamber of Commerce into the Tel Aviv and Central Israel Chamber of Commerce. In 2009, he led the Chambers of Commerce's separation from the Coordinating Bureau of Economic Organizations as part of a struggle against policies that, in his view, harmed employers' rights. This was in response to a "package deal" signed between the Histadrut (Israel's national trade union center), the Coordinating Office, and the Prime minister, which proposed amendments to 13 labor laws that, if passed, would have disrupted the balance between employees' rights and employers' rights in Israel.

Lynn was elected six times to the executive board of Eurochambres (the organization of European Chambers of Commerce) and three times to the executive board of the International Chamber of Commerce, which represents Chambers of Commerce from 125 countries.

Lynn's leadership allowed the Federation of Israeli Chambers of Commerce to become the umbrella organization for Israel's trade and service sector and liberal-professional sector. In this capacity, Lynn has waged a constant struggle against what he perceived to be encumbrances imposed on Israel's business sector, including new labor laws, excessive consumer protections, and environmental protection laws that place the burden of protecting the environment on businesses. Lynn also led a battle against the labor courts, particularly the Labor Courts of Israel, for their denial of basic employer rights, such as restricting employers' freedom of expression regarding employee organization, including the establishment of unions, in their businesses. In addition, he has waged a long-term struggle against what he perceived to be excessive freedom granted to employees of state-owned monopolies to engage in strikes, which, in his view, harms the economy and the general public. This latter struggle led to his appointment as a public representative at the Labor Courts of Israel, where he served for two years.

Lynn also led a Chamber initiative against the use of the term "employer of labor" (ma'avid in Hebrew), which derives from the same root (avd) as "slave" (eved) and may therefore be perceived as exploitative. He advocated for its replacement with the term "employer" (ma'asik in Hebrew), which originates from the same root (esk) as "business" (esek) and is considered more positive and equitable. Furthermore, Lynn initiated the drafting of an international bill to protect employers' fundamental rights. This draft bill was later approved at the General Assembly of the World Chamber Federation during its session in Turin, Italy, in 2015. In addition, Lynn successfully secured the passage of the first Israeli law protecting the rights of Israeli agents in their relationships with foreign suppliers.

He also led a Chamber initiative that resulted in an amendment to the Mandatory Tenders Law, allowing Small to Medium Enterprises (SMEs) to participate in public sector tenders. Previously, such enterprises were effectively barred from participating due to unreasonably high and unbalanced threshold conditions.

During his tenure, Lynn focused on implementing structural changes that would have a lasting impact on Israel's business sector in several key areas:

First, he led efforts to reduce corporate taxes for all businesses, lowering the rate from 36% to 25%. He advocated for the right of every business to receive state protection during times of war or pandemic, regardless of the nature of the business. He also worked to limit the right to strike in state-owned monopolies, particularly in the seaports, and sought to reduce the regulatory control exercised by the Standards Institution of Israel over imports. Additionally, Lynn fought against the automatic increase in municipal taxes and worked to ease the regulatory burden imposed on businesses. He provided long-term support for the construction of new seaports in Israel, which helped break the monopoly of the older ports. Throughout his tenure, he also waged a persistent battle against changes that he viewed as disrupting the balance between employer and employee rights.

Lynn has published numerous articles in all major Israeli newspapers throughout his public service career and continues to do so today. His writings reflect his views on each of the seven positions he has held over the course of his career.

== Struggle against road traffic accidents ==
A significant portion of Lynn's public-sector work has been dedicated to combatting road traffic accidents, drawing from his expertise as a specialist attorney in this field. He served as Chairperson of the Knesset Subcommittee for Road Safety and as Joint Chairperson of the 1987 Parliamentary Committee of Inquiry tasked with addressing the issue. Additionally, he chaired a committee focused on improving driving standards among new drivers.

In 2010, Lynn was appointed Chairperson of the Israel National Road Safety Authority. In this capacity, he developed a comprehensive program addressing road safety concerns, particularly for vulnerable groups such as kindergarten kids and infants, pedestrians, and young drivers. His program also tackled issues related to cellphone use while driving, truck and bus safety, urban traffic disruptions, unlicensed drivers, and habitual traffic offenders. Additionally, he initiated a motion aimed at improving cyclist welfare.

One of his key recommendations—increasing the duty of care required from drivers approaching pedestrian crossings—was incorporated into transportation regulations in 2015. He is also credited with introducing the mandatory use of seatbelts on urban roads, a regulation that has saved many lives. During the 11th Knesset (1985), Lynn submitted a bill proposing that 20% of all state revenues from vehicle purchases and use be allocated to improving road infrastructure. While the bill passed its first reading, it was ultimately blocked by the Ministry of Finance. Nevertheless, it played a crucial role in raising awareness about the urgent need to increase investments in Israel's road infrastructure.

== Books ==
- Milestone: A History of Public Service in Seven Chapters (Even Derech: Shiv'ah Perakim Be'Sherut Ha'Tsibur), edited by Dan Carmely and published in Tel Aviv by Bursi Publishers in 2012: A selection of Lynn's articles as published in the Israeli press in the course of forty years of public service.
- Li'ad and the Ravens (Li'ad Ve'Ha'Orvim), edited by Vered Levi-Barzilay and published in Tel Aviv by Contento de Semrik in 2014.
- Self Defense (Haganah 'Atsmit), edited by Vered Levi-Barzilay and published in Tel Aviv by Contento de Semrik in 2015.
- Fond Memories of Shfeya (Zichronot Ahava Mi'Shefeya), edited by Eliraz Ner-Gaon and published in Tel Aviv by Steimatzk in 2015.
- The Birth of a Revolution (Leydatah Shel Mahapecha), edited by Yehudah Ye'ari and published in Tel Aviv by Yedioth Books in 2017.
- Life According to the Uncle from China (Ha'Chayim Al Pi Ha'Dod Mi'Sin), published in Tel Aviv by Steimatzky in 2018.
- How the Israeli Political System was changed 1990–2022 (Ketzad Shunta Hashita Hapolitit Be-Israel), written jointly with Shlomi Loya, published in Tel-Aviv by Teper Publishers Ltd. in 2021.

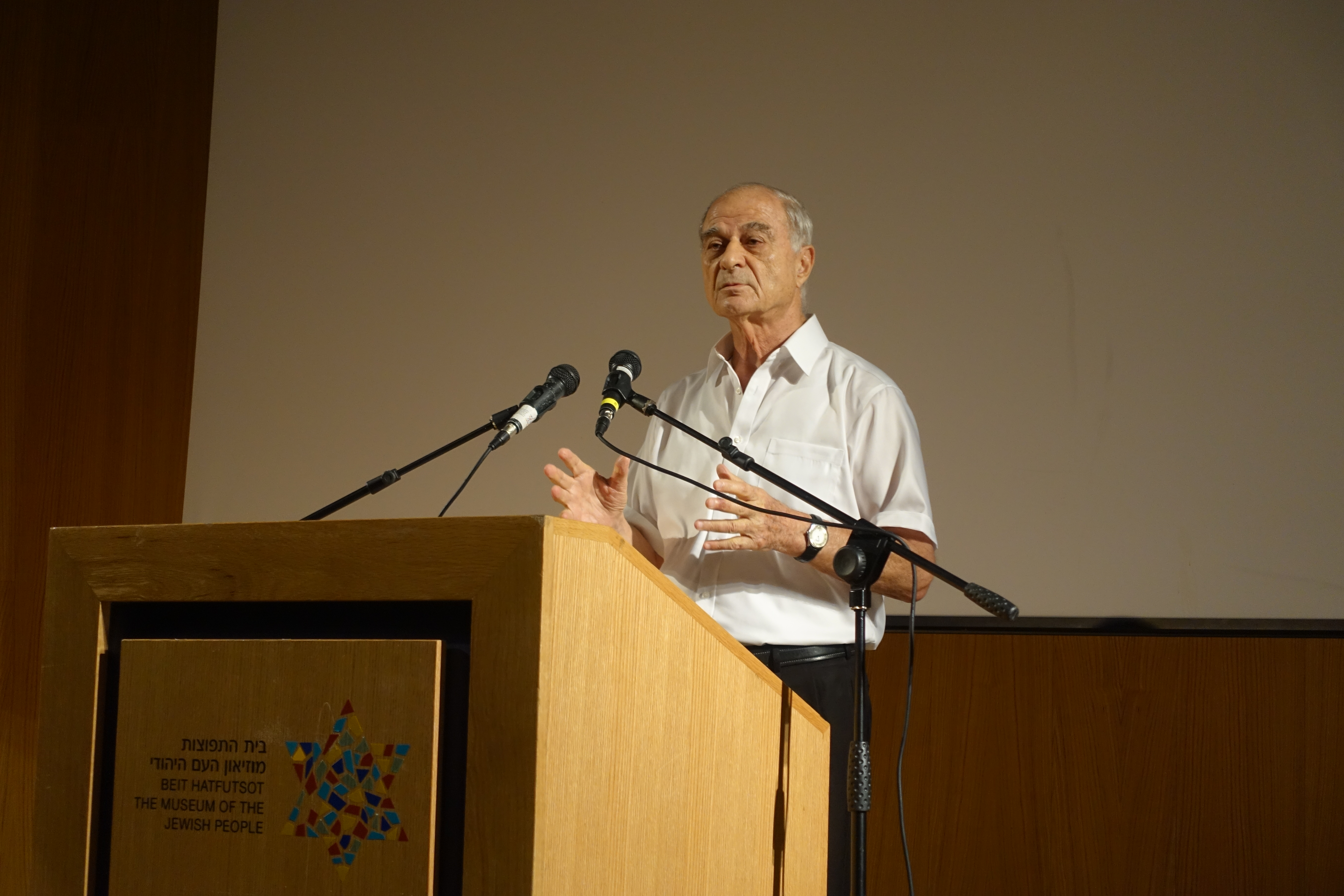
Uriel Lynn delivering a speech during a ceremony celebrating the publication of The Birth of a Revolution that was held at the Museum of the Jewish People at Beit Hatfutsot in Tel Aviv, 2017.

== Prizes and awards ==
- Knight of Quality Government, awarded to Lynn by the Movement for Quality Government in Israel in 2003.
- The Grosse Goldene (Decoration of Honor for Services to the Republic of Austria) awarded to Lynn in August 2006 by the Federal President of the Republic of Austria.
- Movement Luminary Decoration, awarded to Lynn by the Likud Movement in December 2013.
- Colledge of Education Gordon Award.
