= Privatization in Israel =

The privatization in Israel refers to the transferring or selling of a service or property owned by the Israeli government or any public organization to private ownership. The meaning of the privatization is reducing the share and level of intervening which is directly connected with the Israeli government in the Israeli economy, increasing the portion and the economic activity of a private group, on the control and ownership of the assets. The opposite process is nationalization.

== Privatization processes ==
The privatization processes in Israel intensified in 1986 following the intensified privatization in Britain in the 1980s. So far around 90 government companies and subsidiaries have been privatized in Israel, which produced for the country, between the years 1991 and 2003 – a revenue amount of 8,749 million U.S. dollars.

The privatization processes in Israel belong mainly to the following types:

- Gradual Sale: a gradual sale or dilution of the state’s holdings in the public body to the extent where the state would no longer have a significant holding of the body. A notable example for this is the gradual selling of the Israeli telecommunications provider "Bezeq" and the gradual selling of the Israeli banks, which were originally nationalized following the Israeli Bank stock crisis in 1983.
- One-time sale: A one-time sales or issuing all of the company’s shares in the stock exchange. This is the method of action which is most common amongst the smaller companies or when there is a single buyer.
- Franchises and Licenses: initiating privatization processes by means of outsourcing, transferring of franchise, privileges, etc., especially of certain services which are consumed by government bodies. Such an action is not considered privatization by the definition of the Israeli government.
- Disassembly: the disassembly of a governmental body completely due to lack of need of its existence or losses which were made due to the existence of a competitive market.

Many refer to the structural change which has happened in many of the kibbutzim in Israel "privatization of the kibbutzim", although this process does not in relate to privatization processes. The kibbutz is a private voluntary association and not a public association, and the changes which occur in it are not considered Privatization as it is described in this article.

== Public sector ==
The origin of the companies, like the rest of the components of the public sector in Israel, started in the period of the Yishuv, which evolved in parallel with the state. The structure of the Israeli public sector was designed during the pre-state period, a period in which the national institutions were established, which were designed in a large extent continued to operate and become a major part even after the establishment of the state. Through the years, reciprocal ties and cooperation was formed between the public sector and the private sector. These patterns were manifested with the establishment of joint businesses, along with various cases of transition from the private sector to the public sector and from the public sector to the private sector. The various parts of the public sectors recognized the economic importance of their activities, and it is difficult to distinguish between the political motives and considerations and economic considerations. The two were, and would continue to be interwoven with each other.

=== Components of the public sector in Israel ===
- The World Zionist Organization and the Jewish Agency for Israel
- The Histadrut
- Cabinet of Israel

After the state of Israel was founded and the cabinet was established, many dominant institutions which were formed beforehand were transferred to its possession as an "inheritance". The Israeli government like many other governments acts and intervenes in the economy of the state in order to realize major aims such as: ensuring competition, providing public goods, ensuring the existence of information and preventing restrictions on the ability of the public to choose, ensuring the stability, growth and aid in low point periods and in times of crises.

The public sector in Israel contains in it many non-governmental organizations, and the entirety of the organizations is not only a source of budgetary revenue, but also a source of expenditures. The flow of finance from various sources expands the boundaries of the public sector and adds an important dimension to the Israeli political economy.

The activities of the public sector are measured to a large extent by the public consumption. A reduction or increase in the consumption reflects the involvement extent of the state in the Israeli economy.

The extent of involvement might derive from the security expenditures made by the state and the expenditures made on immigrant absorption.

== Implications of privatization ==
The privatization in Israel consists of ideological problems. The ruling between neo-liberal perceptions or social democratic welfare state perceptions, which are both opposite economic and social perceptions.

Arguments in favor of privatization:

- Reducing government spending
- Promoting competition
- Maintaining a strong economy
- Increasing efficiency and making services cheaper.

The supporters of privatization in Israel claim that reducing the state's involvement increases the involvement of individuals. Thus, promoting competition, encouraging investment, having a strong economy and reducing the state expenses—which would lead to cheaper services.

Arguments against privatization:

- The transferring of the capital monopoly into the hands of a small group of wealthy private owners.
- It would harm the employees.
- It would harm the effectiveness.
- Losses of the government.
- It doesn't always necessarily increase efficiency
- Making the manpower cheaper and reducing it.
- It would harm the recipients of the services.

The opponents of privatization in Israel argue that companies would also be able to be effective under government ownership. Privatization affects employees and leads to the dischargment of employs, leads the workers to choose to get early pension and salary cutbacks. The Israeli economy is gradually becoming controlled by a small number of rich families. The privatization of public services affects the public and especially the poor population, which are the main consumers. One of the main goals of the state is to take care of its citizens, people’s security, people’s education, to the profitability and to the preservation of the social community. A state which disclaims those responsibilities violates its own principles.

The method which has become customary in Israel in the last decades is selling the control of the public assets into the hands of capital owners, while other countries rather choose to issue the company shares to the public and company employees.

== Examples ==
A partial list of the Israeli companies which have been completely or partially been privatized:

Agriculture:

- Agridev (אגרידב חברה לפיתוח חקלאי)
- Weed Control Company (החברה להדברת עשבי בר)

Construction and infrastructure:

- Efridar (אפרידר)
- Lod-Ramle Region Development Company (החברה לפיתוח אזור לוד-רמלה)
- Industrial buildings
- The Israeli construction center (מרכז הבנייה הישראלי)
- Housing and development company of Israel (שיכון ופיתוח לישראל)
- Labour Housing company (שיכון עובדים)
- Water works engineering of Israel (תה"ל - תכנון המים לישראל)

Transportation and aviation services:

- El Al Airlines (including Sun d'Or International Airlines)
- MAMMAN cargo handling terminals (ממן מסופי מטען וניטול)
- ZIM Navigation – the biggest cargo shipping company in Israel, and 13th largest in the world.
- Israel Shipyards – the biggest Shipyard in Israel (מספנות ישראל)

Finance, banking and funding:

- I.D.B Holdings (אי.די.בי החזקות)
- Union Bank of Israel (בנק איגוד)
- Israel Discount Bank (בנק דיסקונט לישראל) – partial privatization
- Bank Mizrahi Tfachot (בנק מזרחי טפחות)
- Bank Hapoalim (בנק הפועלים)
- General Bank (בנק כללי)
- Bank Leumi (בנק לאומי לישראל) – partial privatization
- The Israeli Credit Insurance Company (החברה הישראלית לביטוח אשראי)
- Otzar HaShilton HaMekomi (אוצר השלטון המקומי)
- Industrial Development Investment Company
- "Yozma" Venture Capital Initiative (יוזמה הון סיכון)

Natural resources:

- The National oil company (חברת הנפט הלאומית)
- Israel Chemicals (Including more than twenty subsidiaries, such as the Dead Sea Works company, etc.)
- Lapidot (and its subsidiary Metsada)
- Magen gas and crude oil resources company (מגן משאבי גז ונפט)
- Nefta (נפטא חברה ישראלית לנפט)
- Paz Oil (פז נפט)
- National Coal Supply Company
- Oil Refineries Ltd (בתי זיקוק לנפט)

Technology, Industry and telecommunication:

- Bezeq
- Koor Industries (כור תעשיות)
- MALAM Systems (מלם מערכות)
- Beit Shemesh Engines Ltd. (BESL) (מנועי בית שמש)
- Rafael Advanced Defense Systems Ltd. – partial privatization
- Shore-Van screenings (שור-ואן הקרנות)

Governmental Authorities:

- Prisons – at this stage a single privately operated prison is approved.

General:

- The Israeli Tourism School (בית הספר לתיירות בישראל)
- The governmental company for medallions and coins (החברה הממשלתית למדליות ולמטבעות)
- Tourism Development Corporation (חברה לפיתוח מפעלי תיירות) – was dismantled
- Katit (כתית)
- Weizmann Institute Press (מוסד ויצמן לפרסומים)
- Shekem Ltd. and Shekem real estate (שקם בע"מ ושקם נדל"ן)

== Privatizations planned in the near future in Israel ==
- Gapim (גפים)
- The Company for automation in the management of the local government (החברה לאוטומציה במנהל השלטון המקומי)
- Tadmor (תדמור)
- Israel's Postal Services Ltd. (חברת דואר ישראל)
- Israel's Postal Bank (בנק הדואר)
- Israel's Driving Testers organization (who are going on a strike to prevent privatization)

== See also ==
- The Shakshouka System – an Israeli documentary film from 2008 which focuses on the allegedly Crony capitalism in Israel.
