= The Shakshuka System =

The Shakshuka System שיטת השקשוקה
- Directed by: Ilan Aboody
- Written by: Ilan Abudi; Uri Weasberod
- Produced by: Sharon Carney; Gili Dickerman
- Cinematography: Ilan Aboody
- Edited by: Martha Wieseltier
- Release date: 2008
- Running time: 93 minutes
- Country: Israel
- Language: Hebrew

The Shakshuka System (Hebrew: שיטת השקשוקה) is a 2008 Israeli documentary film created by the Israeli investigative journalist Mickey Rosenthal and the Israeli director Ilan Aboody. The film focuses on the connection between private capital and government in Israel and suggests that a system exists whereby the State of Israel sells its limited resources, cheaply, to a handful of wealthy families. The film shows this by specifically focusing on the business relationship between the political leadership in Israel and one of the wealthiest families in the Israeli economy – the Ofer family.

The film won the Ophir Award for Best Documentary film in 2009.

While the film was being produced, the Ofer Brothers Group filed a lawsuit against the creators of the film and no Israeli TV channel would show it. Initially the film was screened in Cinematheques, different events, and in the Knesset. A year after the premiere, it was broadcast on Channel 1, followed by a film produced by the Ofer Brothers in response. In February 2010 the lawsuit was dismissed.

== Overview ==
The film explores the sale of state assets, such as the Dead Sea Works, ZIM and the Oil Refineries Ltd, to the Ofer Brothers Group. Government officials who carried out these transactions on behalf of the State of Israel became senior employees of the Ofer group after retiring from the public sector. The film tracks the interaction between seniors in the public sector, the media and the Ofer group, claiming the Ofer Brothers managed to avoid scrutiny due to their ties with key people in the media such as Rafi Ginat.

A central part of the film deals with a donation attempt by Sammy Ofer to the Tel Aviv Museum of Art in exchange for the renaming of the museum after him and his wife, and for provisions which would entitle him, according to the film, to ownership rights to the structure of the museum. The film presents a report of the Ministry of Environment which claims that the factories of the Ofer Brothers Group, such as the Oil Refineries, are polluting the environment and shows the negative effects which their pollution causes. In the film Mickey Rosenthal also confronted a senior in the Israeli Cancer Association after the association gave a certificate to Sammy Ofer for his contribution.

The film's name is a culinary metaphor which refers to the alleged deal made which resulted in Ofer Brothers Group acquisition of ZIM, the national shipping company, for a seemingly very low price. The metaphor made during the film by the Israeli lawyer Ram Caspi, who represented the Israel Corporation (controlled by the Ofer Brothers Group) in the negotiations over the acquisition of the government shares in ZIM. In the film Caspi claims that the Ofer Brothers Group, which were the only company to participate in the auction over Zim's shares, closed the deal after the sides agreed on a final price which was much lower than the real worth of the shipping company. According to the film, a few months after the sale, Zim was appraised at three or maybe four times the price at which the state sold its interest.

== Controversy ==
While the film was being made, a libel lawsuit was filed against Rosenthal and his wife by Ariel Shemer, the lawyer of the Ofer family. Rosenthal also received several death threats. Rosenthal was not deterred but the Yes company, which helped finance the film, later withdrew its finance backing and refused to broadcast it. According to Yes, this decision was made because of scenes relating to people suffering from Cancer as a result of pollution, which Rosenthal added to the film contrary to the agreement the company made with him. According to the filmmakers, they agreed to cut out several parts from the film so that Yes would approve the broadcasting of the film, yet it was eventually decided that the film would not be broadcast.

The banning of the film created a public uproar. Among others, a number of filmmakers unions organized and held a press conference about the censorship made due to pressure from the wealthiest people in Israel's economy. Eventually the film was approved for screening at the Cinematheque in Tel Aviv, despite cease and desist letters sent by the lawyers of the Ofer family. Later on the film was screened at the Jerusalem Cinematheque.

Channel 10 and Channel 1 expressed interest in the film, but were also pressured not to broadcast it. As a result, the Association for Civil Rights in Israel contacted the management of the Israel Broadcasting Authority claiming concern for the freedom of expression and democracy in Israel. Channel 1 announced that the film would be broadcast with a few corrections but decided to show it in full, followed by a response movie produced by the Ofer family. In July 2009, both films were shown on Channel 1 in a special broadcast hosted by Oded Shachar.

A compromise agreement was reached in September 2009 between Rosenthal and the Ofer family, in which the family agreed to pay Rosenthal NIS 40,000 for court costs.

== Reactions ==
The attempts to prevent the screening of the film led to a substantial media interest. "This is the film that nobody wants you to see. Now everyone should see it" wrote Yaron Ten-Brink, a television critic of Yediot Aharonot. "Drop everything and go see this movie. You would get a more detailed accurate explanation of how the state steals from us and transfers the gains to the Ofer brothers," wrote the Israeli journalist Guy Meroz in Maariv. Haredi journalist Koby Arieli urged readers to "Go see The Shakshouka System. Do not miss it."

== Awards ==
- Ophir Award:
  - Best Documentary Feature (won)

== See also ==
- Privatization in Israel
- Crony capitalism
