= Gadiv Petrochemical Industries =

Israeli chemical company

Gadiv Petrochemical Industries Ltd.
- Company type: Private company
- Industry: Petrochemical
- Founded: 1974
- Headquarters: Haifa, Israel
- Key people: Shlomi Basson, Chief Executive Officer; Ovadia Ali, Chairman
- Products: Aromatic hydrocarbons, aliphatic solvents, intermediates
- Number of employees: 92 (2020)
- Website: www.gadiv.com

Gadiv Petrochemical Industries Ltd. גדיב תעשיות פטרוכימיה בע"מ, is an Israeli petrochemical company, part of Bazan Group owned by Israel Corporation Ltd. Gadiv offices are located in Haifa, Israel. The company manufactures and markets over 500 thousand tons of petrochemical products each year including aromatics, aliphatic solvents and intermediates for the chemical, pharmaceutical, plastic and food industries. Gadiv is wholly owned by Oil Refineries Ltd.

== History ==
Gadiv was established in 1974 in order to serve the plastics and chemical markets in Israel and neighboring countries in the Mediterranean basin. The plant was planned to produce a nameplate capacity of 170,000 mt, started operating in 1978 in Haifa. Over the last 30 years, Gadiv's production capacity has grown due to major technological upgrades to more than 500,000 mt per year. Oil Refineries Ltd. established full ownership in 1994.

== Products ==
- Aromatics:
  - Benzene
  - Toluene
  - Solvent Xylene
  - Orthoxylene
  - Paraxylene
  - Solgad 100 - Aromatic Light
  - Solvent Naphtha
  - Solgad 150 - Aromatic Heavy
  - Solvent Naphtha
  - Solgad 200 - Aromatic Super
  - Heavy Solvent Naphtha
- Aliphatic Solvents:
  - Hexane
  - ISO Hexane
  - Heptane
  - Tailor-Made Solvents
- Intermediates:
  - Phthalic Anhydride
