= UBQ (disambiguation) =

Unbiquadium, Ubq (for '124'), is a theoretical chemical element. UBQ may also refer to:

- UBQ Materials, Israeli cleantech company
- UBQ Project, a song on compilation album Fabric 07
