= Mickey Rosenthal =

Israeli politician

- מיקי רוזנטל
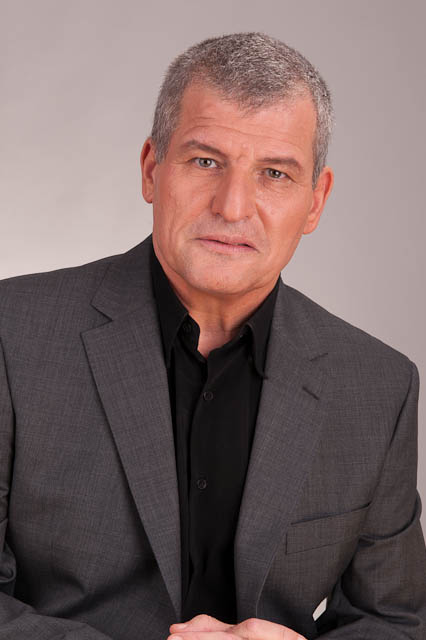

Faction represented in the Knesset
- 2013–2015: Labor Party
- 2015–2019: Zionist Union
- 2019: Labor Party

Personal details
- Born: 4 February 1955 (age 70); Tel Aviv, Israel

Moshe Michael "Mickey" Rosenthal (Hebrew: משה מיכאל "מיקי" רוזנטל; born 4 February 1955) is an Israeli investigative journalist and politician. He is a member of the Labor Party and was placed twelfth on the party's list for the 2013 Knesset elections. He served as a member of the Knesset for the Labor Party and the Zionist Union between February 2013 and April 2019.

Rosenthal together with Israeli director Ilan Abudi made the film The Shakshuka System about support for wealthy families, in particular the Ofer family, by the Israeli government.

Mickey Rosenthal studied general history and philosophy at Tel Aviv University but didn't graduate. He is married with three children and lives in Givatayim.
