= Jack (Tato) Bigio =

Israeli entrepreneur (born 1966)

Jack "Tato" Bigio
- Born: 1966 (age 59–60); Lima, Peru
- Citizenship: Israel
- Education: Hebrew University of Jerusalem
- Occupations: Entrepreneur; Business executive
- Years active: 1996 - Present
- Employer: UBQ Materials
- Known for: Environmental entrepreneurship
- Title: Co-founder and Director at: UBQ Materials
- Children: Four
- Website: Ubqmaterials.com

Jack “Tato” Bigio (born 1966) is a Peruvian-born Israeli business executive and environmental entrepreneur. He co-founded UBQ Materials in 2012, an advanced material company that converts mixed household waste into a bio-based thermoplastic. Bigio served as UBQ Materials CEO since inception till 2022. Bigio serves as UBQ’s President, Director and Chief Growth and Sustainability Officer. Earlier, he was President and CEO of Ampal-American Israel Corporation, publicly traded in NASDAQ, from 2002 to 2006. In 2006 he co-founded Merhav Renewable Energies, focusing on wind, solar and bioethanol projects. He earned a BA and MBA in Business at the Hebrew University of Jerusalem. In 2020 he was named to the Meaningful Business MB100 list of leaders combining profit with purpose.

== Early life and education ==
Jack "Tato" Bigio was born in 1966 and raised in Lima, Peru, and moved to Israel in 1984 as a young adult to pursue higher education. He attended Colegio León Pinelo in Peru. He earned his Bachelor's and Master's degrees in Business and Finance from the Hebrew University of Jerusalem, Summa Cum Laude.

== Career ==
Early in his career, Bigio spent several years at Merhav Group, a leading international project-development firm. According to Ampal's SEC filings, he held senior vice-presidential roles at Merhav from 1996 through 2002. In April 2002, Jack Bigio became President and Chief Executive Officer of Ampal-American Israel Corporation, a publicly traded investment company in Nasdaq and Tel Aviv Stock Exchange. He led Ampal through a period of restructuring, focusing on its core holdings. In September 2006 Bigio announced his resignation as Ampal’s CEO, effective October 2006, in order to return to the Merhav Group. He remained on Ampal's board of directors after stepping down.

In late 2006, Bigio co-founded Merhav Renewable Energies (MRE), a subsidiary of the Merhav Group dedicated to renewable energy projects (wind, solar, bioethanol). He led MRE for the next few years, developing large-scale energy projects worldwide. The company was purchased by a lead investor in late 2008.

In 2012, Bigio co-founded UBQ Materials along with Yehuda Pearl and Rany (Eran) Lev. UBQ Materials developed a patented process to convert mixed municipal waste (including organics) into a novel bio-based thermoplastic composite (UBQ™), that replaces conventional oil-based plastics. Bigio has served in executive leadership at UBQ ever since, initially as CEO till 2022, co-CEO until 2024 and now as President, Chief Growth and Sustainability Officer. Under his leadership, UBQ built its core technology, its R&D center and pilot industrial plant in Kibbutz Tze’elim (producing UBQ pellets since 2018) and has secured major partnerships (with companies like Mercedes-Benz and McDonald’s) and funding. In 2021 UBQ’s raised $170 million and a further $70 million in 2023 from investment grups to complete its first full-scale plant in Europe (Netherlands) and expand its activities. Under his leadership UBQ has won several international prizes and recognitions, amongst them the Times Magazine Best Inventions of 2023.

== Recognition ==
Bigio has been named as a lead manager and entrepreneur on several occasions. In 2020 he was named to Meaningful Business’s MB100 list of top leaders who combine profit with purpose. In 2022 he was awarded the Prize for Outstanding Entrepreneur by the Peres Center of Peace and Innovation.
