= SS Dolphin IV =

1956 cruise ship

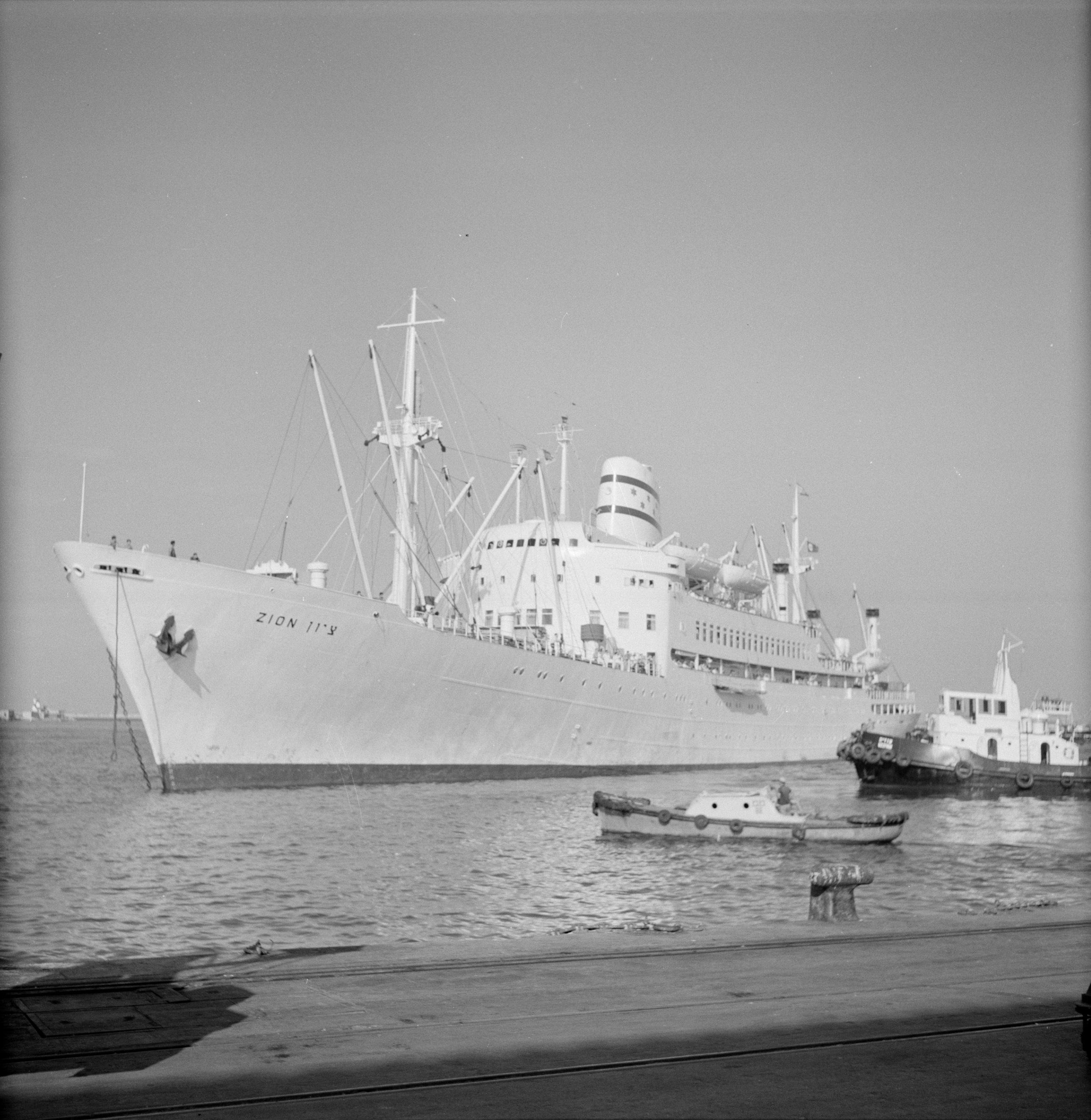
- SS Dolphin IV as SS Zion

History
- Name: Zion (1956–1966); Amelia De Melo (1966–1972); Ithaca (1972–1978); Dolphin IV (1978–2003)
- Owner: Zim Lines (1956–1966); Sociedade Geral de Commercio (1966–1972); Ulysses Line (1972–1984); Dolphin Cruise Line (1984–1995); Cape Canaveral Cruise Line (1995–2003)
- Builder: Deutsche Werft
- Launched: 15 July 1955
- Completed: 12 February 1956
- Maiden voyage: 1956
- In service: 1956
- Out of service: September 2000
- Identification: IMO number: 5398969
- Fate: Scrapped in 2003

General characteristics
- Tonnage: 9,855 GRT (1956–1967); 10,195 GRT (1967–1972); 8,977 GRT (1972–)
- Length: 501 ft (153 m)
- Beam: 65.1 ft (19.8 m)
- Draft: 27.5 ft (8.4 m)
- Installed power: Steam turbine
- Propulsion: Single screw
- Speed: 19 knots (35 km/h; 22 mph)
- Capacity: 312 passengers (1956–1967); 355 passengers (1967–1972); 780 passengers (1972–)

SS Dolphin IV (formerly Zion of Zim Lines), was built in Germany as war reparations for Israel in 1956. She subsequently sailed as Amelia De Melo and Ithaca. In 1978, the ship was renamed Dolphin IV when she sailed under sales and marketing agreement for Paquet Ulysses Cruises, which was part of Paquet French Cruises. The owners of Ulysses Cruises/Florida Nautica made the decision in 1984 to handle the sales and marketing for the ship. This is when Dolphin Cruise Lines was created. The ship has retained her name through her most recent sale to Cape Canaveral Cruise Line in 1995.

The ship remained in operation for Cape Canaveral Cruise Line until September 2000 when it was forced out of service because it needed 3.5 million dollars in required maintenance. The cruise line was unable to secure another vessel and it was unable to afford or receive funding for the needed repairs. As a result, the ship was forced to lay up at Freeport, Bahamas for three years awaiting repairs. Due to the state of disrepair of fresh water and sewage holding facilities, the ship was sold for scrap in 2003.
