= Dolphin Cruise Lines =

Defunct cruise line

Dolphin Cruise Line
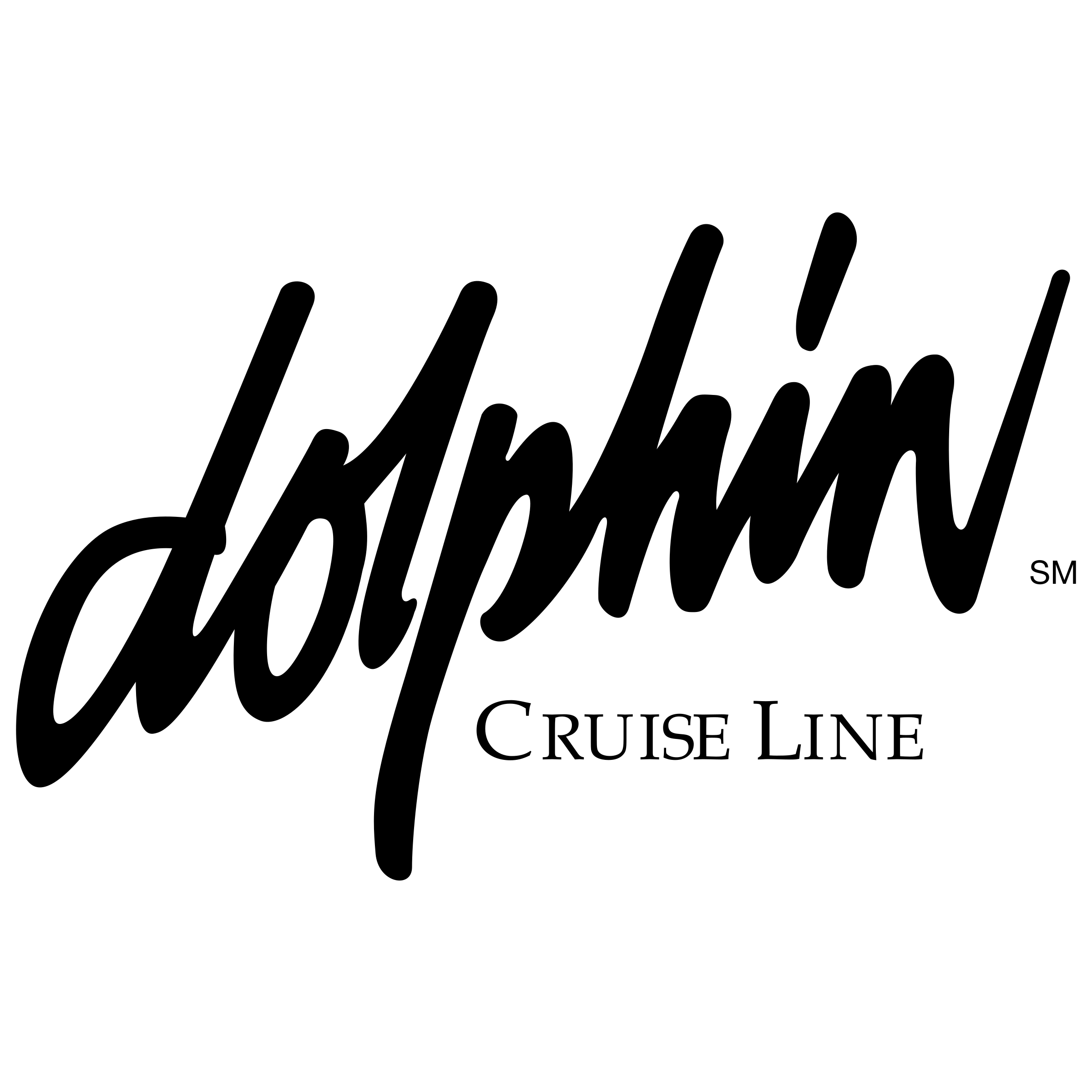
- Type: Cruise line
- Industry: Transportation
- Founded: 1984
- Defunct: 1997
- Fate: Merged into Premier Cruise Line
- Headquarters: Greece,
- Products: Cruises

Dolphin Cruise Line was a cruise line that owned a fleet of ships such as the SS Dolphin IV, SS OceanBreeze, SS SeaBreeze and SS IslandBreeze. In 1997, it was bought out by Premier Cruise Line, and the remaining 3 ships kept their names, but were painted in Premier Cruise Line's livery.

== Former fleet ==
Ship	Built	In service for Dolphin Cruise Line	Tonnage	Notes	Image
Dolphin IV	1956	1984–1995	8,977 GT	Sold to Cape Canaveral Cruise Line in 1995. Scrapped in 2003.	
OceanBreeze	1955	1992–1997	20,204 GRT	Previously Southern Cross, Calypso, and Azure Seas. Sold for scrap In 2003.	
SeaBreeze	1958	1988–1997	21,000 GT	Previously Federico C for Costa Cruises and Royale for Premier Cruise Line. Sank in 2000.	
IslandBreeze	1962	1996–1997	26,632 GRT	Also known as Transvaal Castle, S.A. Vaal, and Festivale. Sold for scrap in 2003.	
