= XT Group =

Shipping line

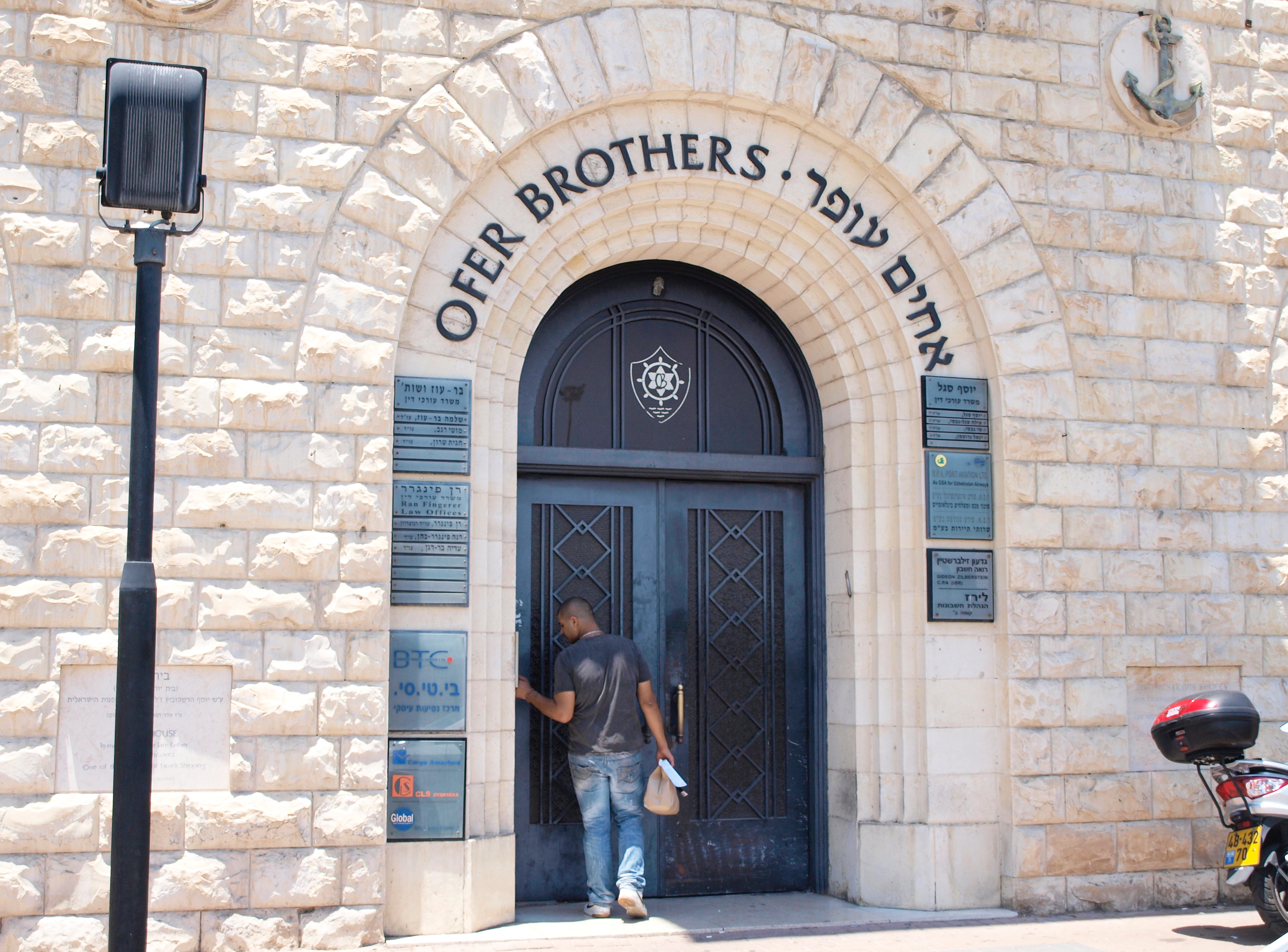
Office of Ofer Brothers in Haifa

The Ofer Brothers Group (Hebrew: קבוצת האחים עופר) is an Israeli family shipping business started by the billionaire Ofer family which is today known as XT Group.

== History ==
Sammy Ofer, KBE (22 February 1922 – 3 June 2011) born in Romania, and brother Yuli Ofer (1924 - 11 September 2011), established the Ofer Brothers shipping company in the 1950s. The Ofer Holdings Group dealt in property in Israel. The company branched out into aviation, high-tech, private equity, insurance, media and real estate. It became known as XT Group in November 2012 and is jointly owned by Idan Ofer and Udi Angel.

Shares in Israel Corporation, one of Israel's largest holding companies, were acquired by the Ofer family in 1999, with the then Ofer Holdings acquiring a stake as part of the extended group. The company's holdings include Zim, Israel Chemicals, Oil Refineries Ltd (BAZAN) in Haifa, Tower Semiconductor and more. The Ofer family is one of 20 families that control 25% of Israel's exchange-listed companies.

On May 24, 2011 the US State Department imposed sanctions on the company for violating the Iranian sanctions regime. According to the State Department, an Ofer subsidiary based in Singapore had sold a ship to Iran in 2010. Former Mossad director Meir Dagan has said that he does not believe any laws were broken by the company's business dealings in Iran, which according to company statements involved the transport of oil and petroleum products in a manner permitted under the sanctions regime. Prime Minister Benjamin Netanyahu's office denied allegations that the company's dealings in Iran had been authorized by the State of Israel. After Sammy Ofer's death in 2011, Netanyahu made a public statement commending Ofer as a "true Zionist".

On 3 June 2011, Sammy Ofer died at his Tel Aviv home at the age of 89. On 11 September 2011, Yuli Ofer died at his Herzliya home at the age of 87.

After Sammy's death, the company was divided between his sons; Eyal received the company's hotel and cruise operations and his younger brother Idan received Israel Corporation, a 9.7% stake in Mizrahi Tefahot Bank, and XT Shipping (part of XT Group, formerly Ofer Holdings). The current chairman and joint owner of XT group is Udi Angel.

== See also ==
- Science and technology in Israel
- Economy of Israel
- The Shakshuka System
