= Tze'elim =

Kibbutz in southern Israel

Tze'elim: צֶאֱלִים (Hebrew)
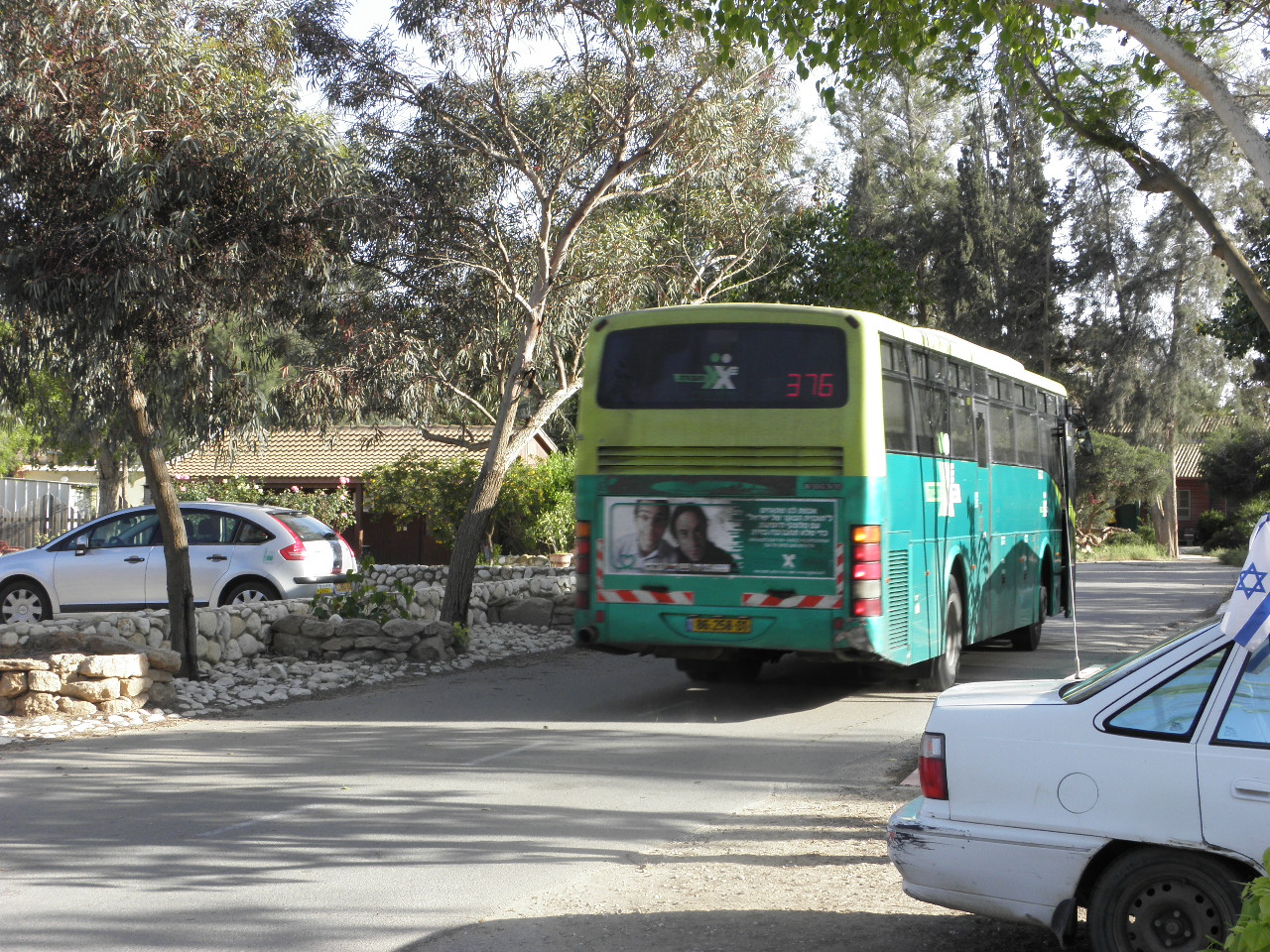
- Egged Ta'avura bus route 376 at Tze'elim

- Location within Northwest Negev region of Israel Location within Israel
- Coordinates: 31°12′13″N 34°32′6″E
- Country: Israel
- District: Southern
- Subdistrict: Beersheba
- Council: Eshkol
- Affiliation: Kibbutz Movement
- Founded: January 1947
- Founder: Eastern European and North African Jewish immigrants
- Population (2024): 493
- Website: www.zeelim.co.il

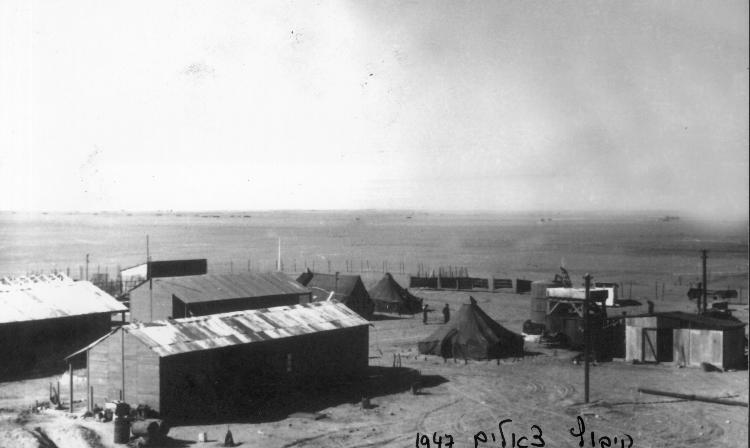
Tze’elim, November 1947

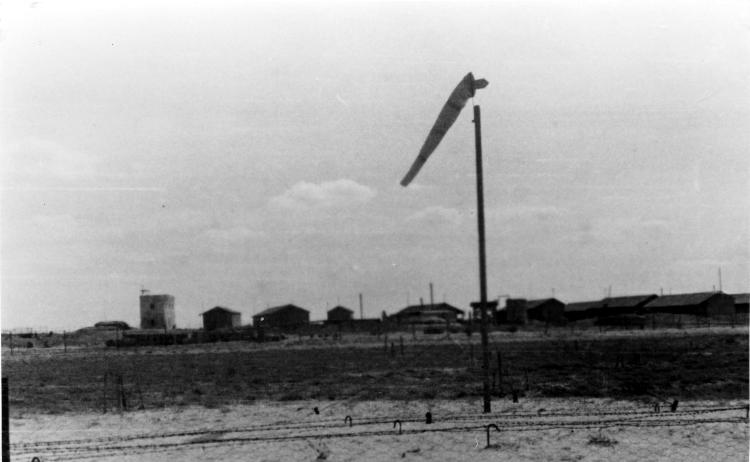
Aircraft landing site, Kibbutz Tze’elim, 1948

Tze'elim (Hebrew: צֶאֱלִים) is a kibbutz in southern Israel. Located in the Negev desert, it falls under the jurisdiction of Eshkol Regional Council. In 2024 it had a population of 493. A military training base of the ground forces of the IDF (often named "Tze'elim Base") is located nearby.

== History ==
The kibbutz was founded in January 1947 by a gar'in of Jewish youth from Eastern Europe and North Africa. It was named for the abundant acacia trees in the area, thought to be the Tze'elim trees mentioned in the Tanakh. During the 1948 Arab–Israeli War the kibbutz served as a military base. Many of the Selvino children settled in the kibbutz.

== Economy ==
Today the kibbutz markets itself as a tourist destination, with a natural hot springs spa and accommodation. Other economic activities are agriculture and farming.

A 120 MW solar power plant, Israel's largest to date, opened in the kibbutz in 2020.

The production plant for cleantech materials made out of unsorted garbage of the Israeli company UBQ Materials is located at the kibbutz.

== Transport ==
Tze'elim is linked to the regional council by bus route 14, to Tel Aviv by bus route 376, to Ofakim by bus route 30 and to Beersheba by bus route 130. All 4 bus routes are operated by Dan BaDarom. Tze'elim is situated off highway 222, in the north-western Negev.

== Urban Warfare Training Center ==
In 2005 the Israeli Defense Forces, with assistance from the United States, built the Urban Warfare Training Center at the Tze'elim Army Base, at a cost of $45 million. Nicknamed "Baladia" (Arabic for "city"), it is a 7.4 square mile training center used to instruct soldiers in urban warfare techniques, and consists of an imitation Middle Eastern style city with multiple multistorey buildings. It has been used to train various military organizations, including the US Army and UN peacekeepers. The project was developed in response to the need for greater urban warfare training amongst the IDF, following the conflict during the Second Intifada.

== External links and references ==
- Official website (in Hebrew)
- Urban Warfare Training Center – Simulating the Modern Battle-Field, IDF 2011
- Israeli MOUT Facility Model for National Guard Global Security
- Tze'elim Negev Information Centre
