= Israel Corporation =

Israeli holding company

Israel Corporation Ltd.
- Company type: Public
- Traded as: TASE: ILCO
- Industry: Oil, Shipping, Energy, Chemicals and Transportation
- Founded: 1968; 58 years ago
- Headquarters: Tel Aviv, Israel
- Key people: Idan Ofer (Chairman of the board), Yoav Doppelt (CEO)
- Revenue: ▲ ₪ 37.2 billion (2010)
- Operating income: ▲ ₪ 6.2 billion (2010)
- Net income: ▲ ₪ 3.7 billion (2010)
- Number of employees: 25
- Subsidiaries: Israel Chemicals Ltd. Oil Refineries Ltd; Tower Semiconductor; Zim Integrated Shipping Services; Qoros (50%)
- Website: IsraelCorp.com

Israel Corporation (Hebrew: החברה לישראל) (also Israel Corp) is Israel's largest holding company. It was founded in 1968 by the Government of the State of Israel.

50% of its manufacturing activities and 70% of its consolidated revenues derive from global operations. Its core holdings are fertilizers and specialty chemicals, energy, shipping and transportation. Israel Corp is a constituent of the TA-35 Index of leading shares of the Tel Aviv Stock Exchange. Two of its major holdings, Israel Chemicals and Oil Refineries Ltd are also constituents of the TA-35 Index.

== History ==
The Israel Corp was founded by the government of Israel in 1968, together with Shaul Eisenberg, who was one of the first strategic foreign investors in Israeli history, under the initiative of then Minister of Finance, Pinchas Sapir of the Israeli Labor Party, who changed the Encouragement of Capital Investments Law to attract foreign investment. The change ensured that the company's owners were exempt from taxes for 30 years and received other benefits.

In 1975, the director general of Israel Corp, Michael Tzur, was sentenced to 15 years in prison after he was convicted on 18 counts of embezzlement, theft, fraud and bribery. He was released from prison in 1981.

Shares of the company were offered to the public in 1969, 1970, 1974 and 1982, and the company was listed on the Tel Aviv Stock Exchange in 1982. After Eisenberg's death in 1998, the family sold control of the company to the Ofer family.

In 2007, 55% of the equity of the company was held by the Ofer Brothers Group, 18% by Bank Leumi and the remainder by the public.

== Major holdings ==
Israel Corp's major holdings are Israel Chemicals, Oil Refineries Ltd, Tower Semiconductor, Kenon Holdings and Zim Integrated Shipping Services.

== Criticism ==
The Israel Corporation was criticized in a documentary film examining the influence of big business on Israeli politics. The movie The Shakshuka System chronicles the history of the company, and how it had allegedly benefited from a "revolving-door" practice between the public and the private sector, from its extensive network of connections in Israel's political system and economic circles, and from a high degree of influence on local media to squelch potential criticism. Among the major allegations presented by the film was the Bazan sale incident, in which the company's stake in the country's largest oil refinery was bought out by Israel's treasury, for what many considered to be an overvalued sum, especially since Israel Corp. was bound by an agreement to return its holding of Bazan to the state without compensation. The company had allegedly blocked the film from being broadcast on any of Israel's commercial TV channels, and it was finally broadcast on Channel One.

== See also ==
- Economy of Israel
