= UBQ Materials =

Israeli cleantech company

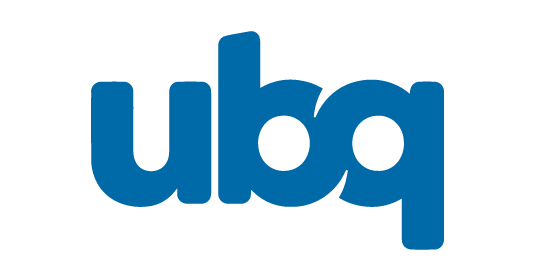
- UBQ Materials Logo
- Type: Privately held company
- Industry: Materials
- Founded: July 2012
- Headquarters: Tel Aviv, Israel
- Key people: Albert Douer, Chairman and CEO; Jack (Tato) Bigio, Co-Founder & Chief Growth and Sustainability Officer
- Products: Thermoplastic composite made from mixed household wastemade
- Website: ubqmaterials.com

UBQ Materials is a global manufacturing company created to convert mixed household waste including all organic content into a thermoplastic composite. The company's primary product, UBQ, is a bio-based thermoplastic sold in the form of tablets or masterbatch that can replace or enhance conventional plastics in the manufacturing of durable or semi-durable products. UBQ is used in several applications across many industries, specifically in building & construction, consumer durables, supply chain & logistics, automotive, and retail. In 2018, UBQ Materials Ltd. became a Certified B Corporation.

In 2023, Time magazine listed UBQ technology as life-changing.

== History ==
UBQ Materials was founded in 2012 by Yehuda Pearl (co-founder of Sabra), Jack (Tato) Bigio, and Eran Lev. The company developed and patented a process to convert mixed municipal solid waste, including organics, into a thermoplastic material known as UBQ. The proprietary and patented product and manufacturing method were developed, tested, and validated between 2012 and 2017.

In 2013, Albert Douer, an experienced executive in construction materials and packaging manufacturing, joined the company as a senior strategic investor later becoming chairman of the board and CEO. In 2024, the company opened a full-scale production facility in Bergen op Zoom, the Netherlands. The plant can process more than 104,600 tonnes of municipal solid waste annually, converting it into up to 80,000 tonnes of UBQ. The Israel facility is now being used as a Research & Development facility.

=== Funding ===
Founded in 2012, UBQ Materials raised an initial $3.5 million in seed funding from private investors. In 2013, Albert Douer joined as a senior strategic investor. Between 2013 and 2019, the company secured another $39 million from Battery Ventures, Albert Douer and other private investors. By 2019, its total disclosed funding had reached approximately $42.5 million.

In December 2021, UBQ Materials raised $170 million in funding led by TPG Rise Climate and The Rise Funds, TPG’s impact investing platform. The round also featured participation from Battery Ventures and M&G’s Catalyst strategy. As part of the deal, Steve Ellis from The Rise Funds and Ignacio Giraldo from TPG Rise joined UBQ’s board of directors, bringing strategic expertise to scale the business. The investment aligned with TPG Rise’s focus on sustainable technologies with significant environmental benefits. J.P. Morgan acted as placement agent, and Latham & Watkins advised UBQ Materials on legal matters for the round.

In September 2023, UBQ Materials closed a $70 million financing round led by Eden Global Partners. The round included returning participants: TPG Rise Climate, TPG’s Rise Fund, Battery Ventures, and M&G’s Catalyst strategy. Eden’s CEO, David Dwek, praised UBQ as a “pioneer” in sustainability and joined the UBQ’s Board of Directors as part of the investment.

Over time, UBQ Materials secured an additional $37.5 million in internal funding rounds along with two non-dilutive grants: a US$1.7M grant from the Israel Innovation Authority (formerly known as Israel Chief Scientist) and a non-dilutive €5 million grant from the EU’s Just Transition Fund in late September 2024.

== Technology ==
Household waste is received at the plant in the form of solid residual material (SRM). The mixture runs through stages of automatic refinement, removing particles of metals and minerals that are sent to recycling facilities. The organic waste, like food leftovers, dirty paper and cardboard, is used in its entirety and broken into its basic building blocks, including fibers, cellulose, lignin, collagens, and sugars. Conventional plastics are then bound to this matrix, reconstructing them into a new bio-based thermoplastic composite, UBQ.

The resulting material is a patented, homogeneous composite, available in tablet or masterbatch form. It can be used with conventional manufacturing equipment for injection molding, extrusion, compression molding, 3D printing, and rotomolding to produce products typically made with oil-based plastics with a reduced environmental footprint. UBQ thermoplastic is a highly recyclable material contributing to a circular economy.

=== Product Portfolio ===
In January 2024, UBQ Materials launched its diversified product portfolio. Since then, it has streamlined the offer to focus on high-performing products that align with customers’ needs.

UBQ Materials Product Offering:

- In May 2025, UBQ Materials introduced the UBQ Masterbatch product line, designed to simplify integration, optimize performance, and scale sustainability across a wide range of applications.
- UBQ ClimaPos, a bio-based, climate-positive sustainability additive that enables greenhouse gas removal and avoidance and assists companies in achieving or surpassing ambitious climate objectives.
- UBQ Industrial, a material replacement for common plastics, engineered for high impact, durability and reliability in operational uses, while also achieving carbon reduction.
- UBQ Nclozur, a sustainability modifier formulated for odor mitigation. UBQ Nclozur is sold only as a modifier to UBQ Materials’ primary additives and replacements. Not sold separately.
- UBQ Q Series, a one-to-one material swap that blends with most polymers. This product was discontinued in May 2025.
- UBQ Impact, was sold as an enhancer to UBQ Material’s primary additives and material replacements. This product was discontinued in May 2025.

=== Application ===
UBQ is utilized as a sustainability additive in retail products, furniture, and within the material supply chain.UBQ thermoplastic is compatible with existing processes, polymers, and equipment. It works with several standard manufacturing processes and technologies, such as injection molding, extrusion, compression molding, 3D printing, and rotomolding. UBQ ClimaPos and UBQ Industrial are compatible with PP, PE, PLA, and PVC, while UBQ Masterbatch is compatible with PP, PS, ABS, polyolefins and elastomers.

Awards

- UBQ Materials received the Zero Waste Award, 2021
- UBQ won a SEAL Business Sustainability Award, 2021
- UBQ won the SustainIL Startup Competition, 2021
- UBQ Materials and Mercedes-Benz won the Automotive Sustainability Award, 2021
- UBQ Materials won the SXSW Innovation Awards, Speculative Design Category, 2022
- UBQ Materials and Maxion won the Plug and Play Sustainability Award, 2023
- UBQ Materials was named to Time’s List of Best Inventions of 2023, 2023
- UBQ Materials, ConMet, and Polyram won the Supplier Partnership Award, 2023
- UBQ ClimaPos won the Silver Edison Award, 2025

== Environmental impact ==
The conversion process uses a closed-loop, energy-efficient process that does not require additional water. It generates no waste effluents, or toxic fumes that could harm human health, air quality, or the climate. UBQ Material’s plant in the Netherlands is highly energy efficient, fully operating on green electricity generated by solar or wind power, as certified by Guarantees of Origin (GOO) generated by solar or wind power.

A third-party verified life cycle assessment (LCA) from ERM found that every kilogram of UBQ tablets produced in Bergen op Zoom, the Netherlands, diverts 1.5 kilograms of waste from landfills and incinerators, significantly reducing greenhouse gas emissions and contributing to a circular economy.

A third-party verified life cycle assessment (LCA) from ERM found that each kilogram of UBQ tablets removes 1.17 kilograms of CO2eq of biogenic carbon (with cradle to gate boundaries) due to the conversion of organic waste into UBQ, with a production carbon footprint of only 0.15 kilograms CO2eq per kilogram UBQ tablets. This results in a net cradle-to-gate carbon footprint of -1.02 kilograms CO2eq per kilogram UBQ tablets.

UBQ is a USDA certified bio-preferred material, contains recycled materials, and is recyclable at the end of life.

== 2023 Hamas-Israel war ==
UBQ Materials was among the many Israeli companies affected by the Hamas attack on October 7, 2023. Two employees, Hadar Berdichevsky, former assistant controller and Uri Russo, maintenance and engineering manager, were murdered in their homes.To protect the safety of its staff, UBQ Materials shut down operations at its plant in Kibbutz Tze'elim for three weeks. Production resumed on October 30, 2023 and remains fully operational.

== See also ==
- Science and technology in Israel
