= ICL Group Ltd. =

Global manufacturer of mineral based products

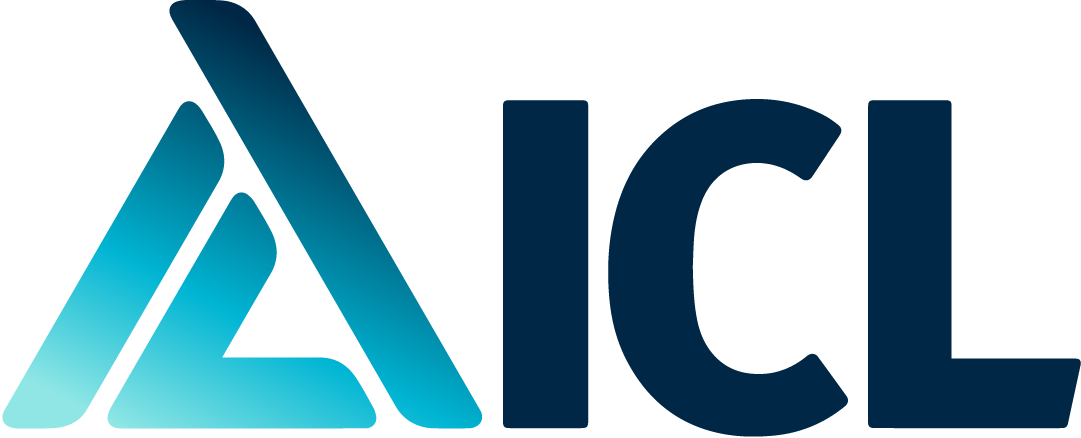
- Native name: איי.סי. אל. גרופ בע"מ
- Type: Public
- Traded as: NYSE: ICL; TASE: ICL
- Industry: Chemicals; Fertilizers; Minerals
- Founded: 1968; 58 years ago
- Headquarters: Tel Aviv, Israel
- Number of locations: 125 offices and plants (2022)
- Area served: Worldwide
- Key people: Elad Aharonson (President and CEO) Raviv Zoller (President and CEO, 2018-2025) Akiva Mozes (President and CEO, 1999-2012)
- Products: Bromine; Flame retardants; Food-grade phosphoric acid; Magnesium; Potash; Phosphate fertilizers; Water treatment solutions
- Revenue: ▲US$6.955 billion (2021)
- Operating income: ▲US$1.21 billion (2021)
- Net income: ▲US$832 million (2021)
- Owner: Institutional investors and general public (56.02%); Israel Corporation Ltd.(43.98%)
- Number of employees: 13,233 (2021)
- Divisions: Industrial products; Potash; Phosphate solutions; Growing solutions
- Website: www.icl-group.com

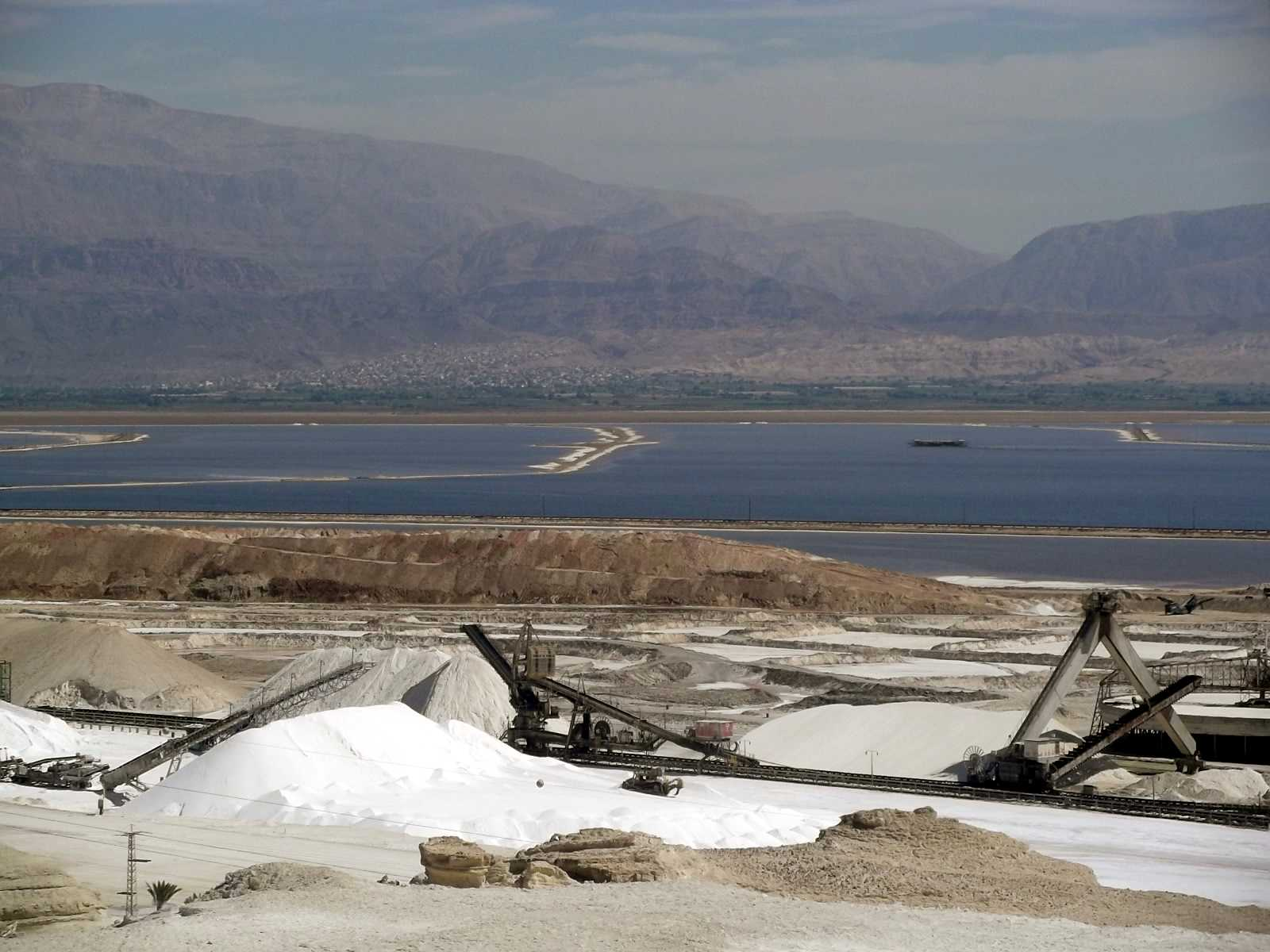
Mineral extraction in the Dead Sea

ICL Group Ltd. (Hebrew: איי.סי. אל. גרופ בע"מ) (formerly Israel Chemicals Ltd., ICL) is a multi-national manufacturing concern that develops, produces and markets fertilizers, metals and other special-purpose chemical products. ICL serves primarily three markets: agriculture, food and engineered materials. ICL produces approximately a third of the world's bromine, and is the world's sixth-largest potash producer. It is a manufacturer of specialty fertilizers and specialty phosphates, flame retardants and water treatment solutions.

ICL is majority controlled by the Israel Corporation, one of the largest Israeli conglomerates. In addition to the Dead Sea Works, Israel Chemicals mines phosphates in the Negev desert.

ICL Group serves customers in Asia.

The company's share is a dual stock traded on the Tel Aviv Stock Exchange since 1991 and on the New York Stock Exchange under the symbol ICL, and is part of the Tel Aviv 35 Index.

== Operations and business ==
90% of ICL's sales are exports. Through its subsidiaries, ICL produces 35% of world's bromine, 13% of the world's potash (excluding US-Canada cross-border trade), 9% of the western world's magnesium and 3% of the world's phosphate rock, (excluding US-Canada cross-border trade).

ICL exports fertilizers to Europe and to numerous specialty chemical market segments. In Israel, ICL is the largest supplier of fertilizers and chemicals, as well as one of Israel's largest companies.

60% of ICL's raw products (minerals) are excavated in Israel. ICL also owns and operates underground mines in Spain, United Kingdom (North Yorkshire), China, the United States and South America. Also, in Ethiopia at Danakil mine, Afar Regional State, purchased from Allana Potash Corporation.

ICL North American headquarters are in Creve Coeur, Missouri.

=== Polysulphate ===
Polysulphate is a brand name for polyhalite fertilizer products produced for farming, turf, and horticulture. The only mined source is a polyhalite seam that lies 150–170 m (490–560 ft) beneath the potash seam at Boulby Mine, England.

=== Food business ===
ICL is active in the market for plant-based meat alternatives and invested $20 million in October 2019 to expand its manufacturing capacity and R&D base.

In December 2021, ICL announced the grand opening of a 10,000 square foot alternative protein production facility in St. Louis, Missouri, previously owned by Bayer.

=== Lithium iron phosphate ===
ICL began developing a new plant in St. Louis to process lithium iron phosphate in 2023. In 2024, ICL received US federal infrastructure grant funds to build a larger plant in north St. Louis. ICL chose to cancel the project after the Trump administration cut the grant in 2025. A similar project planned in Spain was also cancelled.

=== White phosphorus ===
ICL supplies white phosphorus munition to the United States Armed Forces and commercial customers, such as Israel. The largest production facility is in Pine Bluff, Arkansas, as a collaboration with Pine Bluff Arsenal, ICL, and Bayer.

Among 2025 May Day protests was a demonstration outside ICL Iberia in Manresa on account of white phosphorus attacks on civilians in Gaza, as well as extraction of water from Manresa municipality. Protesters called for a boycott of ICL. Humanitarian organizations Amnesty International and Human Rights Watch have documented Israeli use of white phosphorus over dense civilian areas in the Gaza war, arguing that it constitutes indiscriminate attacks and prohibited by the Geneva Conventions as a war crime.

== Financials ==
In April 2009, the company was said to be considering a bond offering to raise 500 million shekels ($122 million).

ICL announced in September 2018 that it was launching a tender to buy back $800 million worth of 4.5 percent debt due in 2024 sold to bondholders in 2014. The bonds of the new offer are running for 20 to 30 years.
