= BAZAN Group =

Oil refining and petrochemicals company located in Haifa Bay, Israel

Coordinates: 32.7934°N 35.0519°E

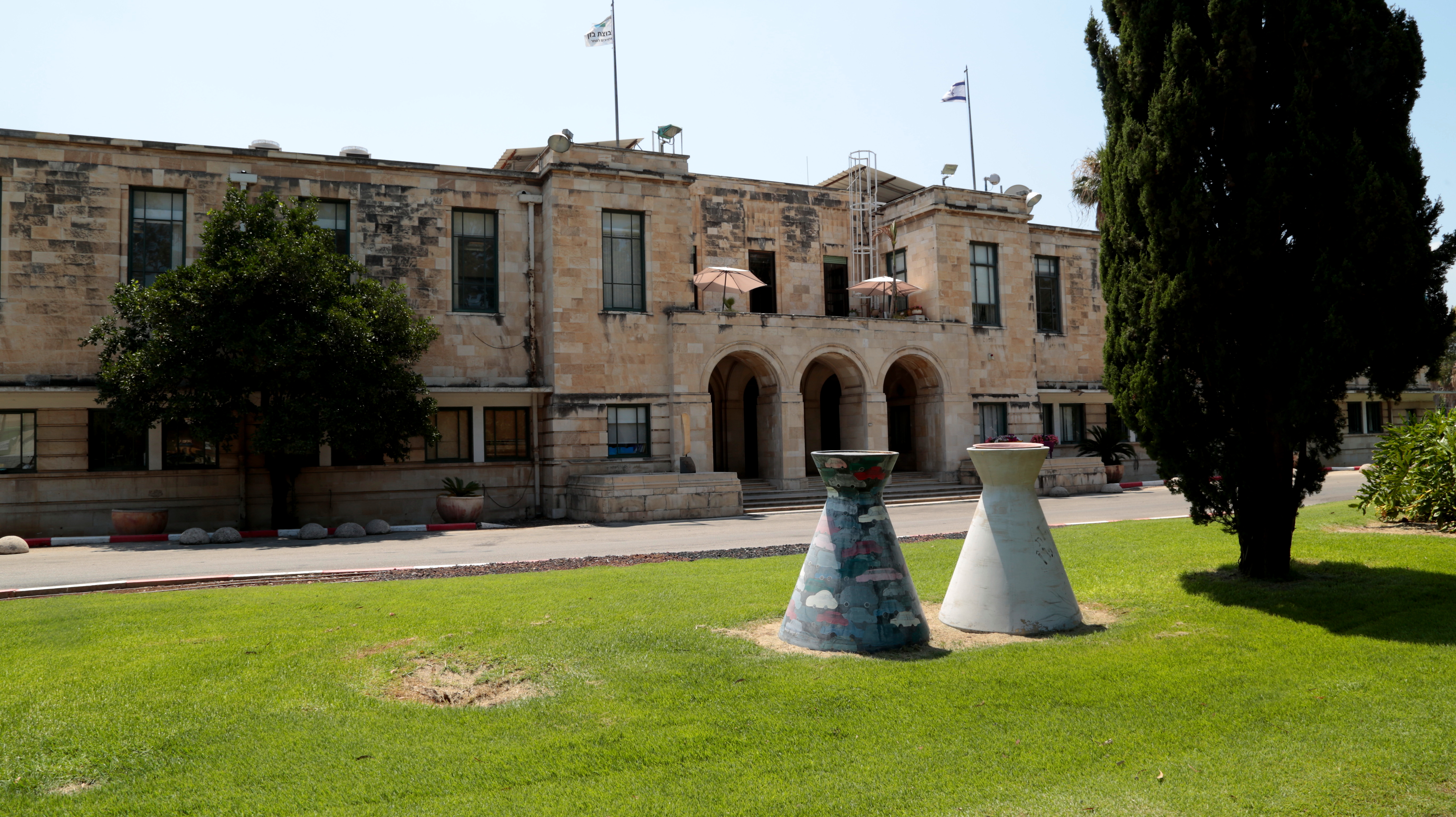
- The administration building
- Type: Public
- Traded as: TASE: ORL
- Industry: Petrochemical industry
- Founded: 1958; 68 years ago
- Headquarters: Haifa, Israel
- Area served: Middle East
- Key people: Moshe Kaplinsky (Chairman); Malachi Alper (CEO)
- Products: Petroleum products, petrochemicals, oil refining
- Revenue: ▲US$13.520 billion (2015)
- Operating income: ▼US$562.52 million (2015)
- Net income: ▼US$272.49 million (2015)
- Total assets: ▲US$4.470 billion (2015)
- Owners: Israel Corp. (33%); Israel Petrochemical Enterprises ltd (15.5%)
- Number of employees: 1,800 (2015)
- Subsidiaries: Carmel Olefins Ltd. Gadiv Petrochemical Industries Ltd.
- Website: www.bazan.co.il

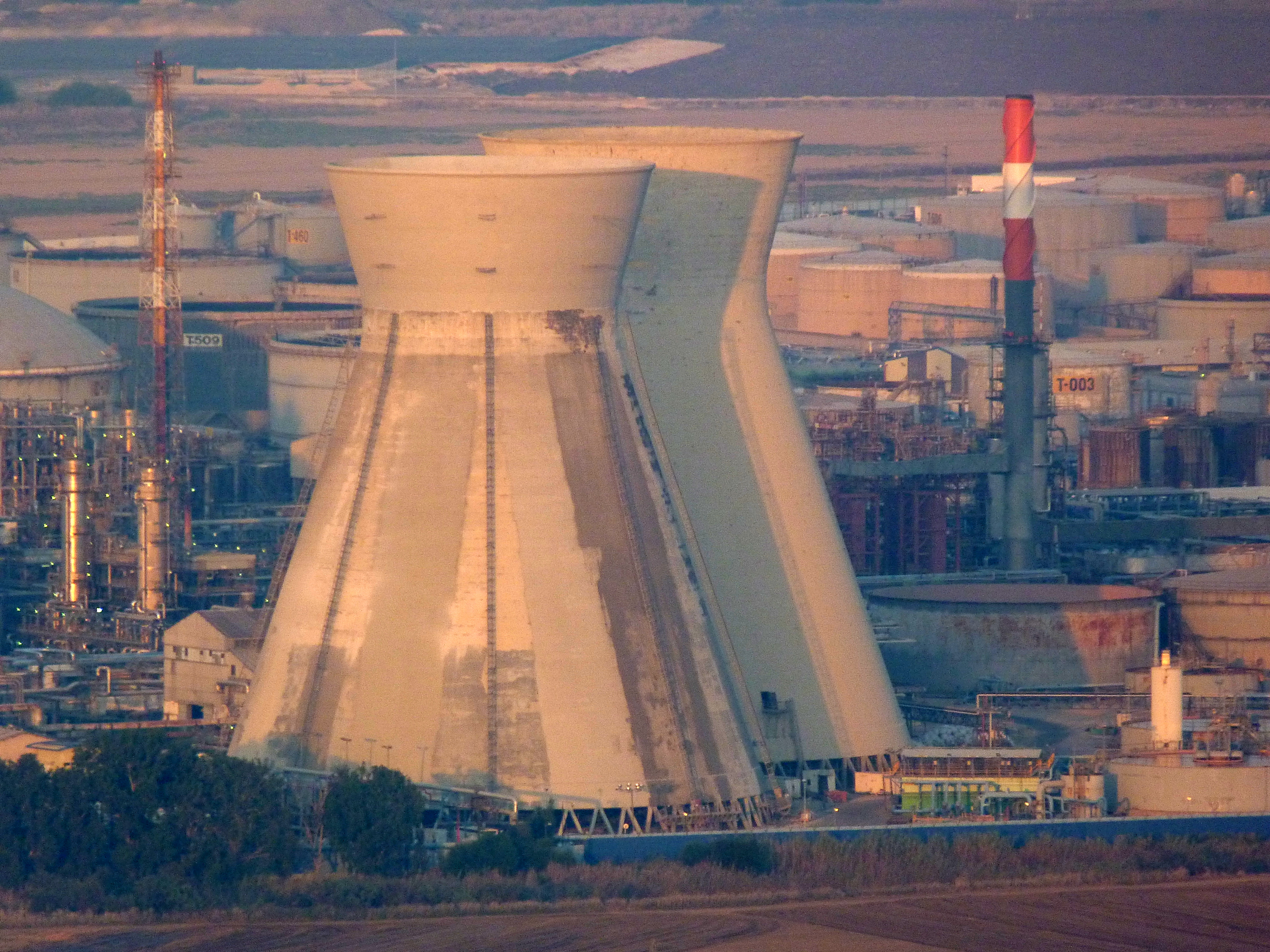
The iconic cooling towers of the Haifa oil refinery (before the collapse of one)

BAZAN Group (BAZAN, Hebrew: בז"ן – בתי זיקוק לנפט בע"מ), formerly Oil Refineries Ltd. (ORL), is an oil refining and petrochemicals company located in Haifa Bay, Israel. It operates the largest oil refinery in the country. ORL has a total oil refining capacity of approximately 9.8 million tons of crude oil per year with a Nelson complexity index of 9. ORL provides a variety of products used in industrial operations, agriculture and transportation. ORL is Israel's largest integrated refining and petrochemical facility. The company also provides storage and transportation services for oil fuel products, as well as electricity and steam to industrial customers in the region.

The company is traded in the Tel Aviv Stock Exchange under the symbol ORL. Until 2020, it was a component of the Tel Aviv 35 Index.

== History ==
The company's beginnings date back to the British Mandate for Palestine when Consolidated Refineries Limited (CRL), a joint venture of Shell and the Anglo-Iranian Oil Company (now BP), started constructing a sprawling refinery complex which sat at the end of the British-built Mosul–Haifa oil pipeline which stretched from the oil fields near Kirkuk in then British-controlled Iraq.

Construction of the first refinery unit started in 1938 and was carried out by the M. W. Kellogg Co. with assistance from Solel Boneh, with an annual capacity of two million tons of crude oil. Construction was completed in 1944, increasing the annual yield to four million tons of crude oil.

During World War II, the complex supplied refined products to British and American forces operating in the Mediterranean and Middle East theatre, and was bombed many times during the early stage of the war by Italy. Damage to the refineries was quickly repaired.

On December 30, 1947, after several weeks of attacks following the UN partition vote in which a number of Jews were killed, members of the Irgun threw two bombs from a passing car into a crowd of Arab workers outside the refinery, killing 6 and wounding 42. In the immediate aftermath, Arab workers at the refinery attacked their Jewish coworkers, killing 39 and wounding 49 in what became known as the Haifa Oil Refinery massacre.

Due to concerns about the Arab League Boycott, the British Government sold CRL to the State of Israel in 1958 which then changed its name to Oil Refineries Ltd.

Since rebranding, the complex has undergone significant expansion and upgrades. In the past, ORL also owned the Ashdod Oil Refinery in southern Israel and therefore as a company, it held a monopoly over oil refining in the country. This changed in 2006, when Israel's Government Companies Authority, headed by Eyal Gabbai started privatization processes.

On August 1, 2006, the Ashdod facilities were sold to the Paz Oil Company for 3.5 billion ILS. In February 2007, 44% of the shares were sold to institutional investors. Following this, 46% were sold to the Ofer-Federman group at 3.30 ILS per share, with the remaining shares sold in an IPO on the Tel Aviv Stock Exchange in 2007. There were more than 5,500 requests to buy shares, an unprecedented number.

The collapse of the eastern Bazan cooling tower, June 12, 2020

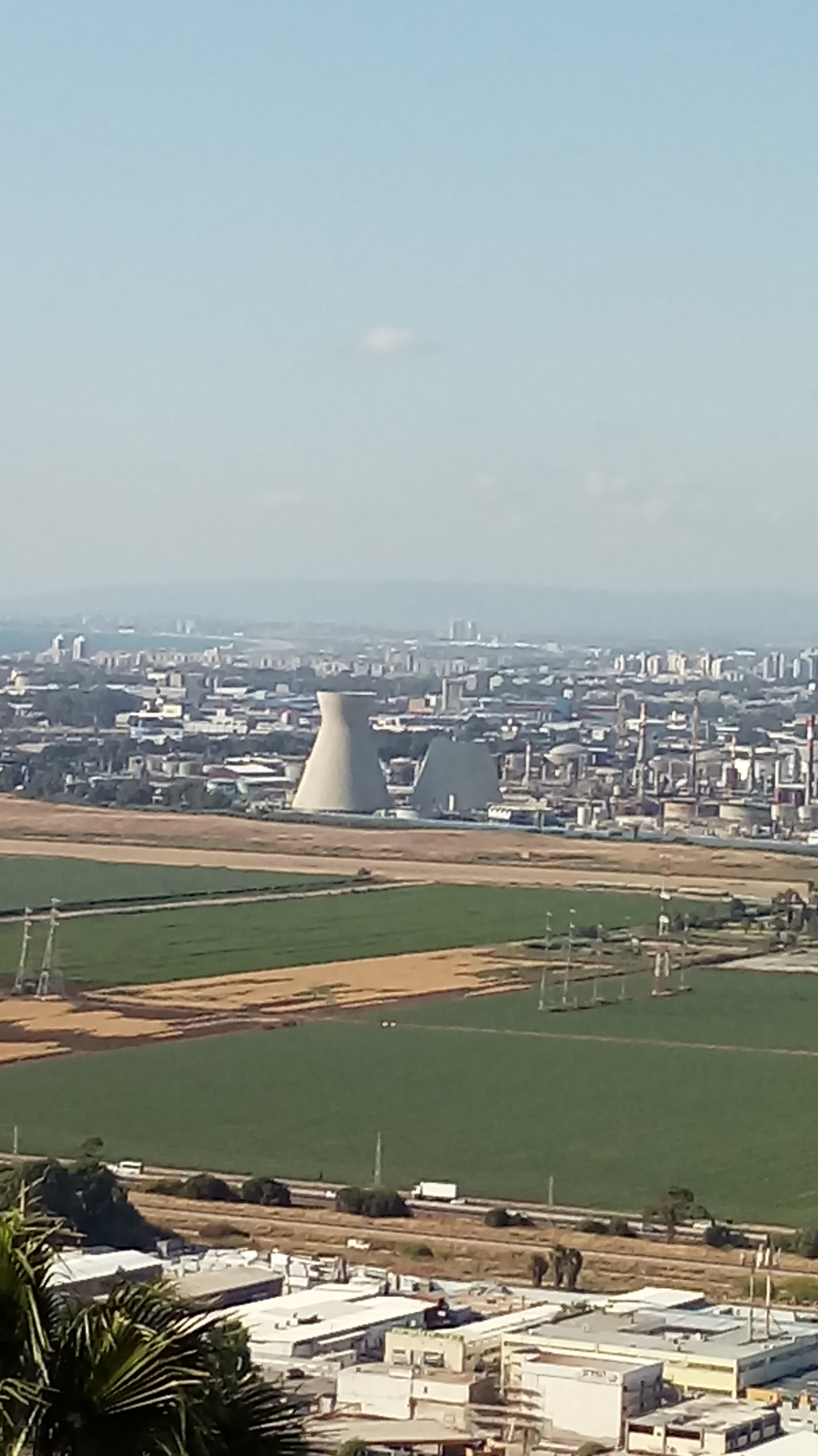
Haifa oil refinery after the collapse of the eastern cooling tower

The company's iconic and historic cooling towers were removed from service in 2008. One of the towers was converted into a visitor center, which is open to the public for free, and include multi-sensory tours. On June 12, 2020, the eastern cooling tower unexpectedly collapsed.

In 2009 the Bazan Group and Olefins companies merged and in 2010 Haifa Basic Oils was fully purchased by Bazan. In 2012 Bazan commissioned UOP's Unicracking strategies in its plants for production of liquid petroleum gas, naphtha, and kerosene.

The facility was struck by two Iranian missiles on 16 June 2025, during the Twelve-Day War. The attack caused a complete shutdown of the facility and resulted in the death of three employees. Bazan Company also reported heavy damage to the refinery's facilities and announced its temporary closure in a statement. The statement stated that the fire had not been extinguished until the day after the attack. The facility was struck by an Iranian missile on 30 March 2026, during the Iran War, causing a smaller fire with no injuries.

More than 70% of ORL's products are distributed locally (for private and public purposes) and the rest is exported. The company is a direct employer of 1,500 workers and an additional 2,000 contractors; the majority of employees are residents of Haifa and the northern region of Israel.

== Subsidiaries ==
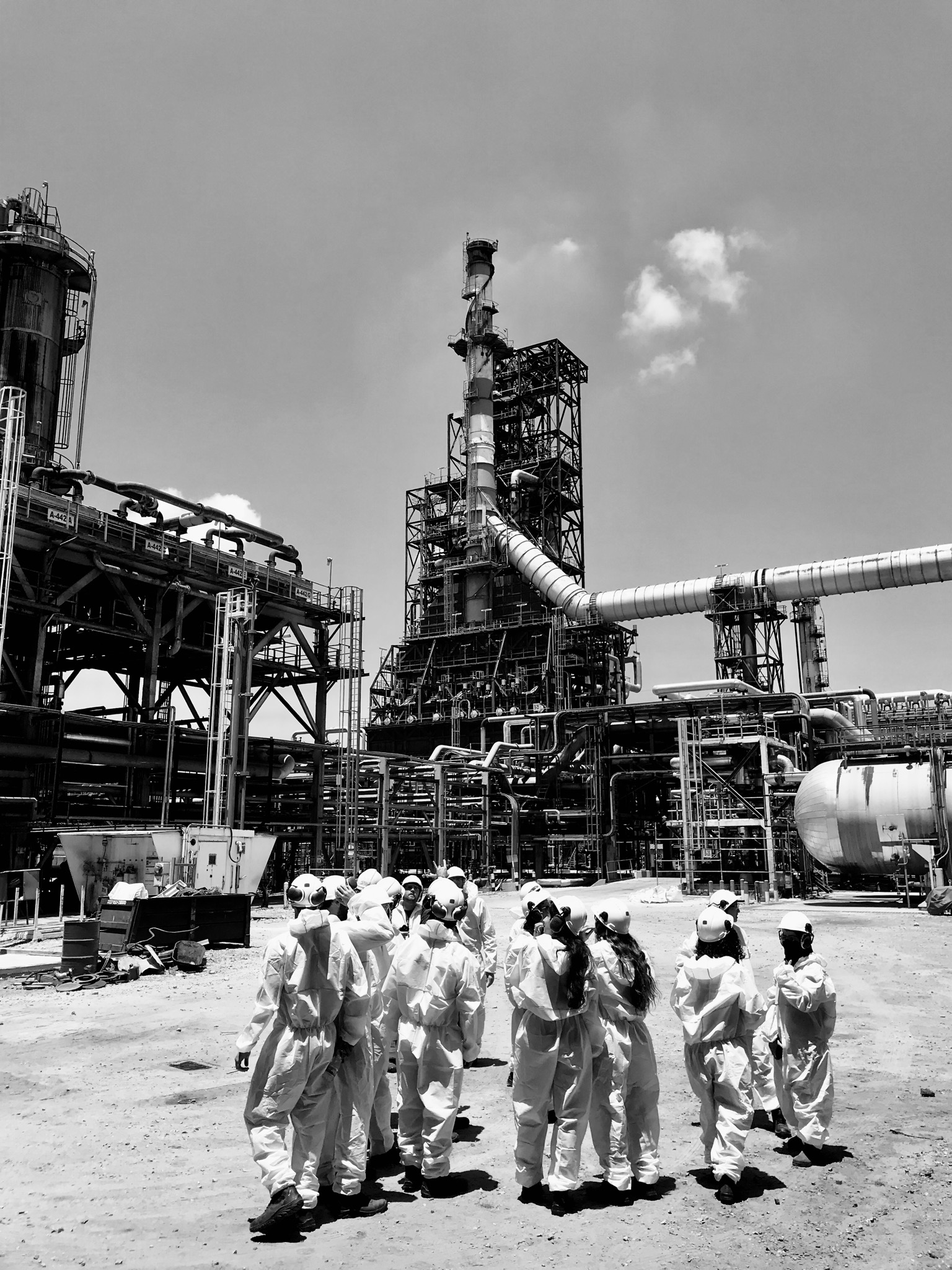
A 2019 photo of engineers at the BAZAN Group facility in Haifa

Carmel Olefins is Israel's sole manufacturer of petrochemical products that are used as raw materials for the plastics industry. Carmel manufactures standard and special grades of polypropylene (PP) as well as a broad range of low density polyethylene (LDPE) grades.

Gadiv Petrochemicals, opened in 1974, manufactures and supplies a range of petrochemicals products including aromatic hydrocarbons, aliphatic solvents and intermediates for pharmaceutical, plastic, food and chemical industries.

Haifa Basic Oils produces base oils and paraffin wax, exporting nearly 50% of its products to overseas companies.

== Partnerships and innovation ==
In 2018 Bazan launched BNNovation, an innovation initiative to grow small and larger companies in the fields of energy, renewable energy, and industry. In 2019, BNNovation was among the founders of ESIL Technologies, an international team operating a lab for cleantech innovation and environmental protection. Also in 2019, Bazan won the tender to establish an environmental innovation lab in Haifa Bay together with the Israeli branch of EDF Renewables and Johnson Matthey.

Partners of the group include Haier Group Corporation and Leumi Partners.

On November 16, 2020, Bazan signed a MOU with the Emirati energy company Mazrui International to import polymers that are not made in Israel. In November 2021, UBQ Materials signed with Bazan to provide climate-friendly thermoplastics for resin products.

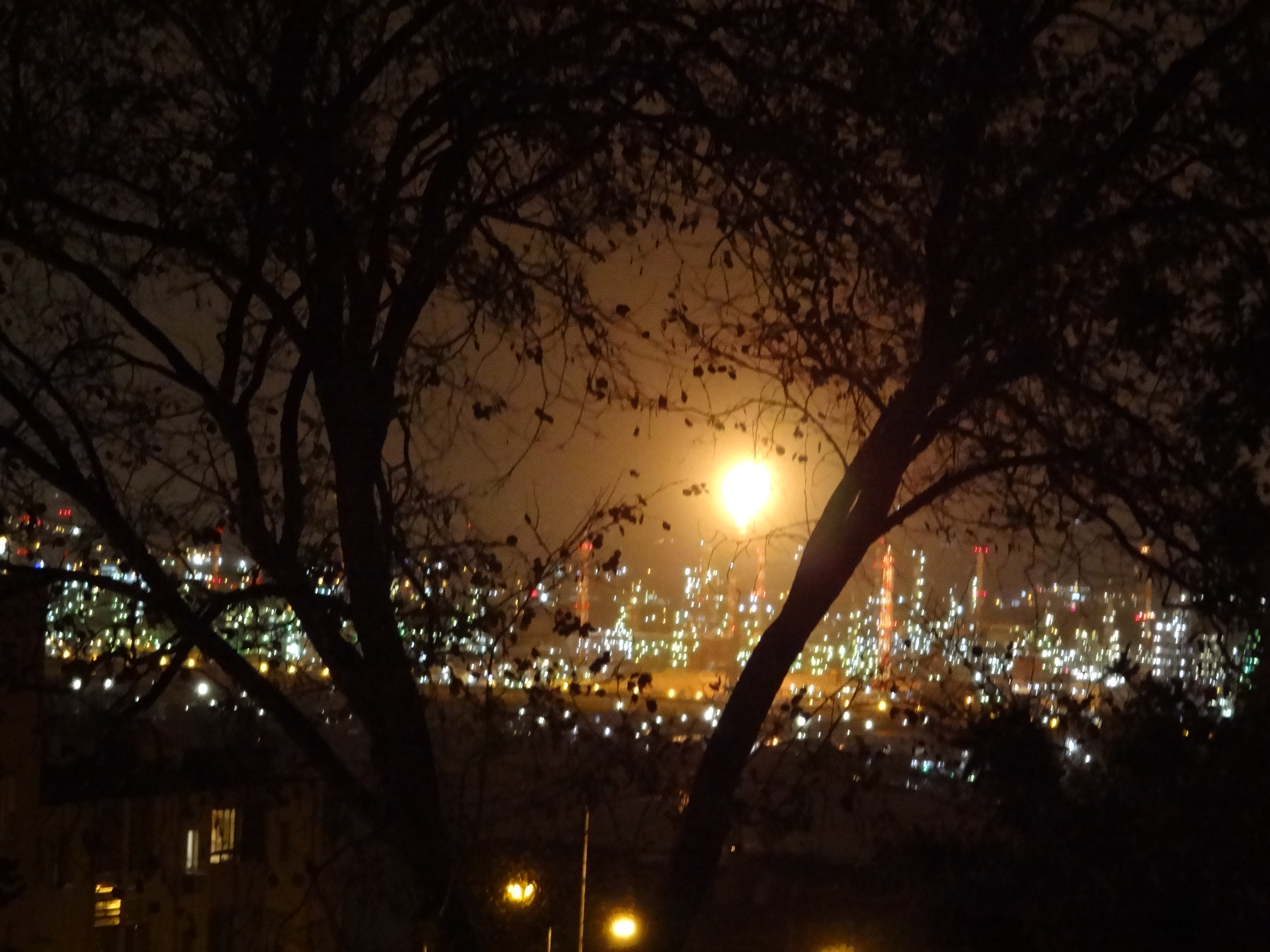
The burning torch of the oil refineries at Haifa, as seen from Givat Nesher

== Environmental impact ==
BAZAN Group's vast petrochemical plants have released significant amounts of pollution to the environment around Haifa Bay. The company has set goals to reduce air pollution, including investing over a billion dollars to develop environmentally-friendly systems.

Starting in March 2011, after being connected to the new national natural gas distribution grid, the plants switched to using natural gas (rather than mostly fuel oil) as their main power source, thus greatly reducing the amount of air pollution emanating from the complex. In 2012, the company also completed a hydrocracking unit. The switch to natural gas was expected to save the company US$200 million per year in fuel and other costs.

In 2014 ORL acquired systems for treating hazards related to smells and treating emissions of volatile organic materials.

In 2020, ORL published its first report for Corporate Responsibility since 2011, including its achievements in reducing benzene emissions and facilitating healthier environmental conditions.

In December 2020 BAZAN announced a $3.7 million project to create, compress and transport hydrogen with the ultimate goal of bringing hydrogen-fueled cars to Israel.

In April 2021, a government CEO committee assigned to resolve Haifa's decline, suggested a full closure of Bazan group's facilities within 10 years is required.

In July 2021, Bazan presented plans to become the leading Israeli supplier of renewable energy and alternative fuels at a conference in Tel Aviv. The company announced it would make $1.5 billion in capital investments by 2030, and laid out a three-pronged strategy built in accordance with international ESG standards. The company announced a set objective of 15% green polymers by 2025 and 30% by 2030.

== See also ==
- Israel Corporation
- Gadiv Petrochemical Industries
