= Liora Ofer =

Israeli businesswoman (born 1953)

- ליאורה עופר
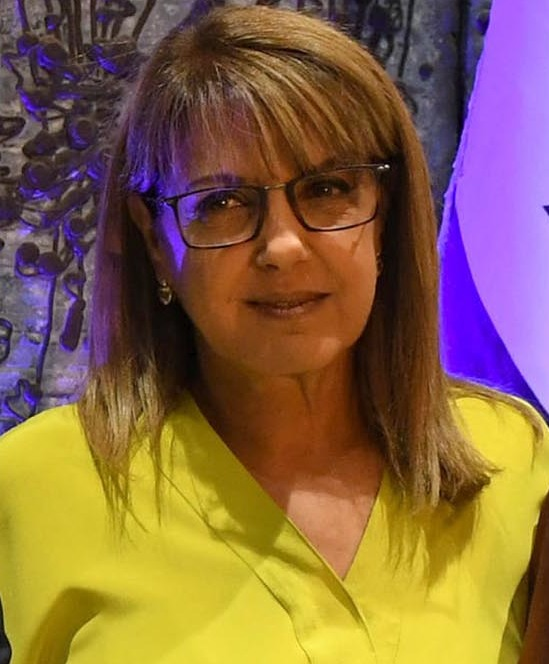
- Ofer in 2017
- Born: 22 December 1953 (age 72); Haifa, Israel
- Title: Chairperson, Ofer Investments
- Relatives: Yuli Ofer (father) Idan Ofer (cousin) Eyal Ofer (cousin}

Liora Ofer (Hebrew: ליאורה עופר; born 22 December 1953) is an Israeli real estate businesswoman who inherited the companies Ofer Investments and Melisron from her father, Yuli Ofer. She is the chairperson of these two companies.

As of January 2024, Forbes estimated Ofer's net worth at US$1.7 billion.

== Early life ==
Liora Ofer was born in Haifa, Israel, where she studied at the Hebrew Reali School. At the age of 20, she began working with her father, the late Israeli billionaire Yuli Ofer, at Ofer Investments, which he founded in 1957 together with his brother, Sammy Ofer.

== Career ==
In 1995, Ofer was appointed general manager of Coral Beach Eilat Ltd. and in 2007 as the director and vice chairperson of Melisron. In 2008, she was named chairperson of the company's board of directors. Under Ofer's leadership, Melisron became one of Israel's largest real estate companies. Its acquisitions included 25 shopping malls from British Israel Investments Ltd and Ramat Aviv mall.

In 2015, Ofer won a court battle with her brother Doron over their inheritance, which left her with a 52% controlling stake in Ofer Investments.
