= Global Holdings =

Real estate firm led by Israeli billionaire Eyal Ofer

Global Holdings Management Group SAM
- Headquarters: New York City, United States
- Key people: Eyal Ofer (Chairman); Jonathan 'JJ' Ofer (CEO)

Global Holdings Management Group (GHMG) is a New York City-based private equity firm operating as an alliance of real estate asset management, investment, and advisory companies. GHMG owns over 120 residential and commercial properties globally, including over 1,500 hotel rooms. The company oversees a 10 million square foot portfolio in, primarily, the United States, United Kingdom, and Europe.

== History ==
Global Holdings was established in 1987 by Monaco-based Israeli billionaire Eyal Ofer. Global Holdings Management Group develops, manages and advises on the real estate interests of Global Holdings Group. The company is headquartered in New York City, with Global Holdings Management Group (UK) Ltd in London, since 1990, and property interests throughout Europe. The GHMG office, hotel and luxury multifamily portfolio is comprised, since 2023, of over 10 million square feet of commercial and residential real estate.

== Investments ==
GHMG owns over 120 residential, mixed-use and commercial properties around the world, in 2025, including over 1,500 hotel rooms. The firm prioritizes luxury rental apartments over condo developments, and has developed several properties with Zeckendorf Development, architects Robert A.M. Stern and Norman Foster, and designers Lore Group.

Most active in New York City, GHMG owns several properties on Billionaires' Row in Midtown Manhattan, including 520 Park Avenue. Manhattan apartment developments include the Anagram Columbus Circle, a 123-unit luxury apartment complex across from the Mandarin Oriental hotel in Columbus Circle.

=== Manhattan, New York properties ===
- 15 Central Park West
- 520 Park Avenue
- 50 United Nations Plaza
- Anagram Columbus Circle
- Anagram NoMad, 10 East 29th Street
- Anagram Gramercy, 51 Irving Place
- 18 Gramercy Park
- The Greenwich Lane
- 180 East 88th Street
- Nomad Tower, 1250 Broadway
- 1841 Broadway
- 1845 Broadway
- 99 Park Avenue
- 120 Park Avenue
- 410 Park Avenue
- 875 Third Avenue
- 545 Eighth Avenue

=== Other properties ===
- The Novus, North Carolina
- Riggs Hotel, Washington, DC
- Washington Harbour, Washington, DC
- Hotel Pulitzer, Amsterdam
- Eden House Hotel, Grantham, Lincolnshire, England
- Sea Containers House, London
