= Novus (Durham) =

Coordinates: 35°59′51″N 78°54′16″W

The Novus
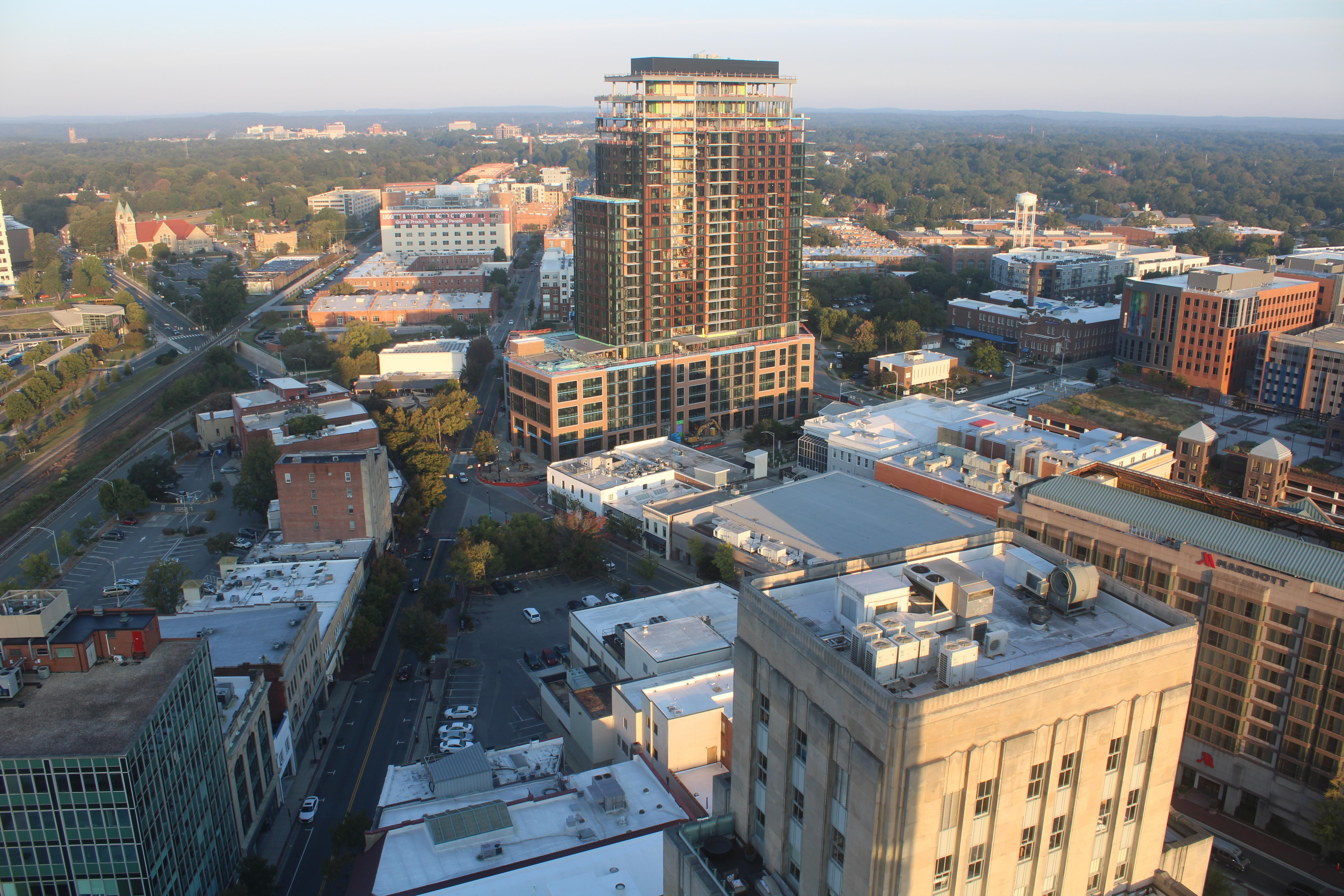

General information
- Status: Completed
- Type: Multiuse
- Location: 115 Morris Street; Durham, North Carolina, USA
- Completed: 2025

Height
- Height: 300 feet (91 m)

Technical details
- Floor count: 27

Design and construction
- Developer: Austin Lawrence Partners

The Novus is a 27-story mixed-use tower at 115 Morris Street in Downtown Durham, North Carolina. The tower is a partnership between Austin Lawrence Partners and Global Holdings, a real estate development firm led by Eyal Ofer. The building site is the former location of the South Bank building.

== History ==
The Novus topped out on January 25, 2024. The Novus opened in July 2025.
