= Sammy Ofer =

Israeli businessman (1922–2011)

- סמי עופר
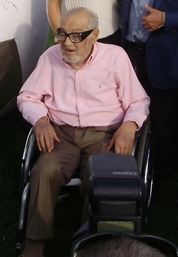
- Born: Shmuel Herskovich; 22 February 1922; Galați, Romania
- Died: 3 June 2011 (aged 89); Tel Aviv, Israel
- Spouse: Aviva Ofer
- Children: Eyal Ofer, Idan Ofer
- Relatives: Yuli Ofer (brother)

Shmuel "Sammy" Ofer (Hebrew: שמואל "סמי" עופר; born Shmuel Hershkovich; 22 February 1922 – 3 June 2011) was an Israeli shipping magnate and one of the richest men in the country.

== Early life ==
Shmuel Hershkovich was born in 1922 in Galați, Romania, to a Jewish family. In 1924, his family immigrated to the then British Mandate of Palestine. The family resided in the port city of Haifa. His father was a merchant who supplied ships, and after finishing elementary school Ofer worked in the family business. He also worked as a messenger boy for a shipping agency in the city and joined the Haganah. During World War II, Ofer enlisted in the Royal Navy and served as a petty officer on a minesweeper based in Alexandria. During the 1948 Arab-Israeli War, he served in the Israeli Navy, participating in its first officer course.

== Career ==
After finishing his military service, he became a shipping agent with the Eastern Conglomerate, and by 1950 had bought his first ship. He expanded in the shipping business.

Ofer's assets were partly in his exclusive ownership and partly owned together with his brother Yuli, consisting of one of the largest private shipping companies in the world, with a value of $3.6 billion in 2011. This includes the companies ZIM, Royal Caribbean International, Israel Corporation, Israel Chemicals, Oil Refineries Ltd, Bank Mizrahi-Tfahot, and Tower Semiconductor.

The annual Forbes magazine's list of The World's Billionaires estimated in 2011 his fortune, together with his brother Yuli's, to be $10.3 billion, ranked him in 2011 as the 79th in the wealthiest people in the world, and the wealthiest man in Israel.

== Philanthropy ==
In March 2008, Ofer donated £20 million to London's National Maritime Museum (NMM) at Greenwich, as part of a £35 million programme of expansion. Ofer donated £3.3 million to help complete the restoration of the Cutty Sark by 2010.

In 2013, a £1.5 million donation from Eyal Ofer enabled the NMM to buy two paintings by George Stubbs from 1772. The paintings depict a kangaroo and a dingo, and are the first depictions of Australian animals in Western art.

In 2007, Ofer donated $25 million to the Rambam Health Care Campus in Haifa, Israel, which included $17 million for its 2000-bed Sammy Ofer Fortified Underground Emergency Hospital.

On 10 November 2008 he was made an Honorary Knight Commander of the Order of the British Empire (KBE) in recognition of his involvement with maritime heritage in the United Kingdom.

== Personal life ==
He was married to Aviva Ofer. They had two sons: Idan Ofer and Eyal Ofer. In the late 1970s he moved to Monaco. He later moved to London before returning to Israel in 2009.

== Death ==
On 3 June 2011, Ofer died in his house in Tel Aviv, Israel, at the age of 89.

== Legacy ==
In 2013, Idan Ofer donated £25 million to London Business School in honor of his father, Sammy. A new educational facility at Marylebone Town Hall was established as the Sammy Ofer Centre. The gift was the largest in the school's history. There is also a well-known Israeli soccer stadium named after him that he also partially funded, Sammy Ofer Stadium in the city Haifa, Israel.
