= Batia Ofer =

Israeli-Canadian patron (born 1974)

- בתיה עופר
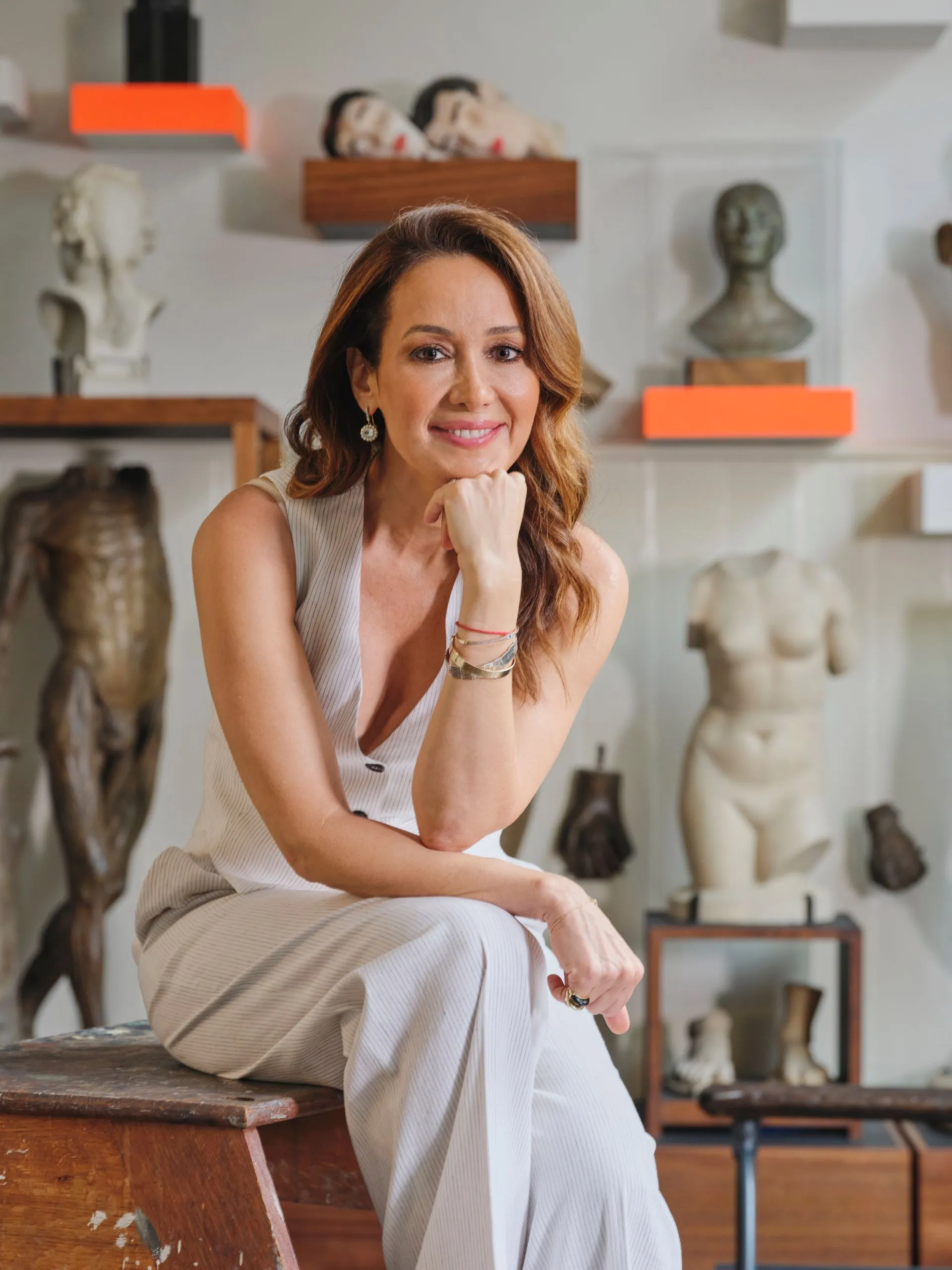
- Born: 1974 (age 51–52); Kfar Saba, Israel
- Education: University of Toronto
- Occupations: Chair of the Royal Academy Trust,Art collector, patron and philanthropist
- Spouse: Idan Ofer

Batia Ofer (Hebrew: בתיה עופר; born 1974) is the Chair of the Royal Academy Trust, an art collector, patron, and philanthropist.

She is the founder of Art of Wishes and the co-founder of the Idan & Batia Ofer Family Foundation.

Ofer is also known for her work for Make-A-Wish Foundation in Israel and the UK.

== Early life ==
Ofer was born in 1974 in Kfar Saba, Israel. On the paternal side, her ancestors are Holocaust survivors from Ukraine.

At the age of 12, Ofer relocated to South Africa due to her father's professional commitment. Ofer has said she was bullied in the school because of her Israeli origins. After finishing high school in South Africa, she returned to Israel to complete her two years of national service. She later moved to Toronto, where she earned a degree in business administration from the University of Toronto. She got married and has a daughter named Daniel. Following a separation, Ofer returned to Israel.

While working as an assistant to the CEO at SAP, Ofer met senior executive Shay Agassi and later joined his electric car venture, Better Place, where she worked as an international relations manager. In this context, she met investor Idan Ofer. They married in 2009. The couple had a son Sammy in 2011.

To develop her interest in the arts, Ofer completed a one-year course at Christie's and received private lessons from an art historian.

Ofer lives in the UK with her husband, Idan, and their children.

== Career ==
During her career, Ofer worked as an assistant to the CEO at SAP and later worked for Shay Agassi's electric car venture, Better Place.

Ofer is a board member of the Peres Center for Peace and the Dean's Executive Board at Harvard Kennedy School. She and Idan Ofer established the HKS Sammy Ofer Graduate Fellowship Fund for Israeli and Palestinian students at the Harvard Kennedy School. She also holds advisory level positions at the Victoria & Albert Museum and Sotheby's.

In mid-October 2023, Batia and Idan Ofer resigned from the Dean's executive board of Harvard Kennedy school, in response to the University’s leader response to Hamas' terror attacks on Israel. Batia Ofer told in her statement that her “faith in the University's leadership has been broken” and that she “cannot in good faith continue to support Harvard and its committees".

In March 2024, Batia Ofer was among the awardees of the Peres Center for Peace Medal of Distinction for Israeli women distinguished in the fields peace and innovation.

In 2025 she received Yakir Bezalel Award from Bezalel Academy of Arts and Design in recognition of her contribution to the advancement of the fields of art, culture, and education in Israel and abroad

== Philanthropy ==
Ofer and her husband, Idan Ofer, manage their charitable activities through the Idan & Batia Ofer Family Foundation, which supports projects in health, education, welfare, and arts and culture in the United Kingdom, the United States, Israel and the Middle East.

=== Make-A-Wish and Art of Wishes ===
Ofer became involved with Friends of Make-A-Wish Israel after the death of her sister, and a few years later became the organization's honorary president. During her time with the Israeli organization she raised about $4.5 million. In 2012 she and gallery owner Alon Segev held an auction of donated works by artists at her home in Arsuf, with the proceeds going to Make-A-Wish Israel.

After moving to the United Kingdom in 2013, she became involved with Make-A-Wish UK.[2] In 2017 she founded Art of Wishes, which raises money for the charity through auctions of donated artworks; according to ARTnews, it had raised more than £15 million by 2026.

=== Shared Society ===
Ofer has expressed support for a two-state solution to the Israeli–Palestinian conflict.

- Harvard Kennedy School: The couple established the Idan and Batia Ofer Graduate Fellowship for Leaders from Israel and Palestine, awarded on merit and financial need to students who have shown a commitment to peaceful relations in the region.
- Salman Habaka Leadership Program: The foundation Partnerships established a leadership fellowship, providing academic scholarships and leadership training for members of the Arab community, with a focus on female empowerment.
- Peres Center for Peace and Innovation: In 2025 the foundation and the Peres Center launched "New Generation", a social entrepreneurship and leadership program for Jewish and Arab high school students.
- Bezalel Academy of Arts and Design: The foundation funded the Idan & Batia Ofer Arts Wing, which houses the academy's departments of fine art, visual communication, photography, and screen-based arts.

Education, Culture, and Arts

- London Business School: In 2013, Ofer donated £25 million ($42 million) to establish the Sammy Ofer Centre, the largest single gift in the school's history.
- Royal Academy of Arts: In 2023 the couple funded the academy's "25 & Under" scheme, which offers half-price tickets to its temporary exhibitions for visitors aged 16 to 25.[19] The scheme was announced in September 2022 and was celebrated at an event held in her honour at the academy in March 2023.
- National Library of Israel: In 2021 the foundation gave $15 million for a public park with an open-air amphitheatre beside the library's new building in Jerusalem.

In 2026 Ofer received the International Patronage Award of the Fundación Callia, presented by the King of Spain.

=== Healthcare and Emergency Relief ===
- Health and welfare in Israel: The foundation has supported hospitals, Holocaust survivors, homeless teenagers, and science education for children in Israel.
- Validation of Interventions Targeting Aging and Longevity (BIO-VITAL): The program harnesses the expertise of aging research capabilities at Albert Einstein College of Medicine to support transformative discoveries in the field of geroscience. Ofer is also on the board of trustees of Einsterin College of Medicine.
- Ukrainian refugees: After the Russian invasion of Ukraine in 2022, the foundation relocated about 600 Ukrainian refugees to Varna, Bulgaria, and provided them with housing, education, and support.

== Art collection ==
Ofer is recognized in London's art community. In December 2023, Ofer was appointed as the chair of the Royal Academy Trust. She is a trustee of the International Council for Sotheby's and has contributed to the V&A Museum.

Ofer has an interest in post-war and contemporary art, especially German art. Over the years, she has collected art works from various artists, including Thomas Struth, Rudolf Stingel, Sigmar Polke, and Mandy El-Sayegh. She has also collaborated with other art collectors such as Larry Gagosian and Damian Hirst.

In 2018, Ofer accused the artist Banksy of creating antisemitic artwork.

In 2024 and 2025, the couple was listed by ARTnews magazine among the Top 200 art collectors in the world. In 2022, Ofer and her husband acquired Philip Guston's "Remorse (1969)" for $7.8 million.
