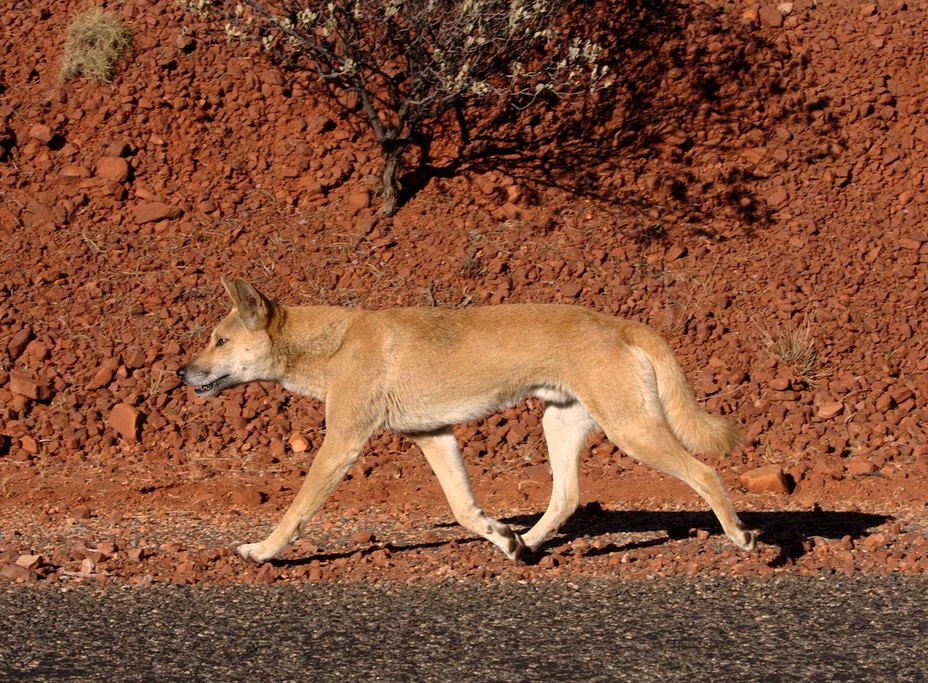
- Australian dingo
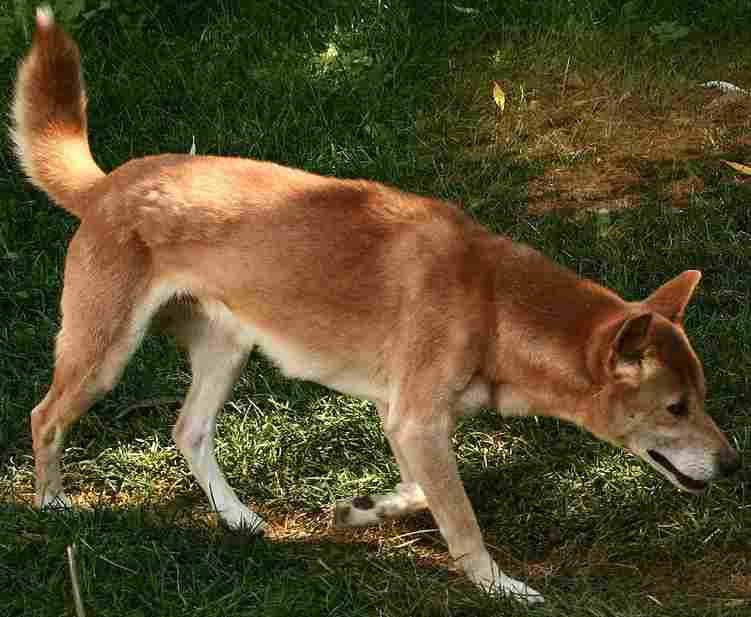
- A New Guinea singing dog

Conservation status
- Domesticated

Scientific classification
- Kingdom: Animalia
- Phylum: Chordata
- Class: Mammalia
- Order: Carnivora
- Family: Canidae
- Genus: Canis
- Species: C. familiaris
- Subspecies: C. f. dingo

Trinomial name
- Canis familiaris dingo Meyer, 1793
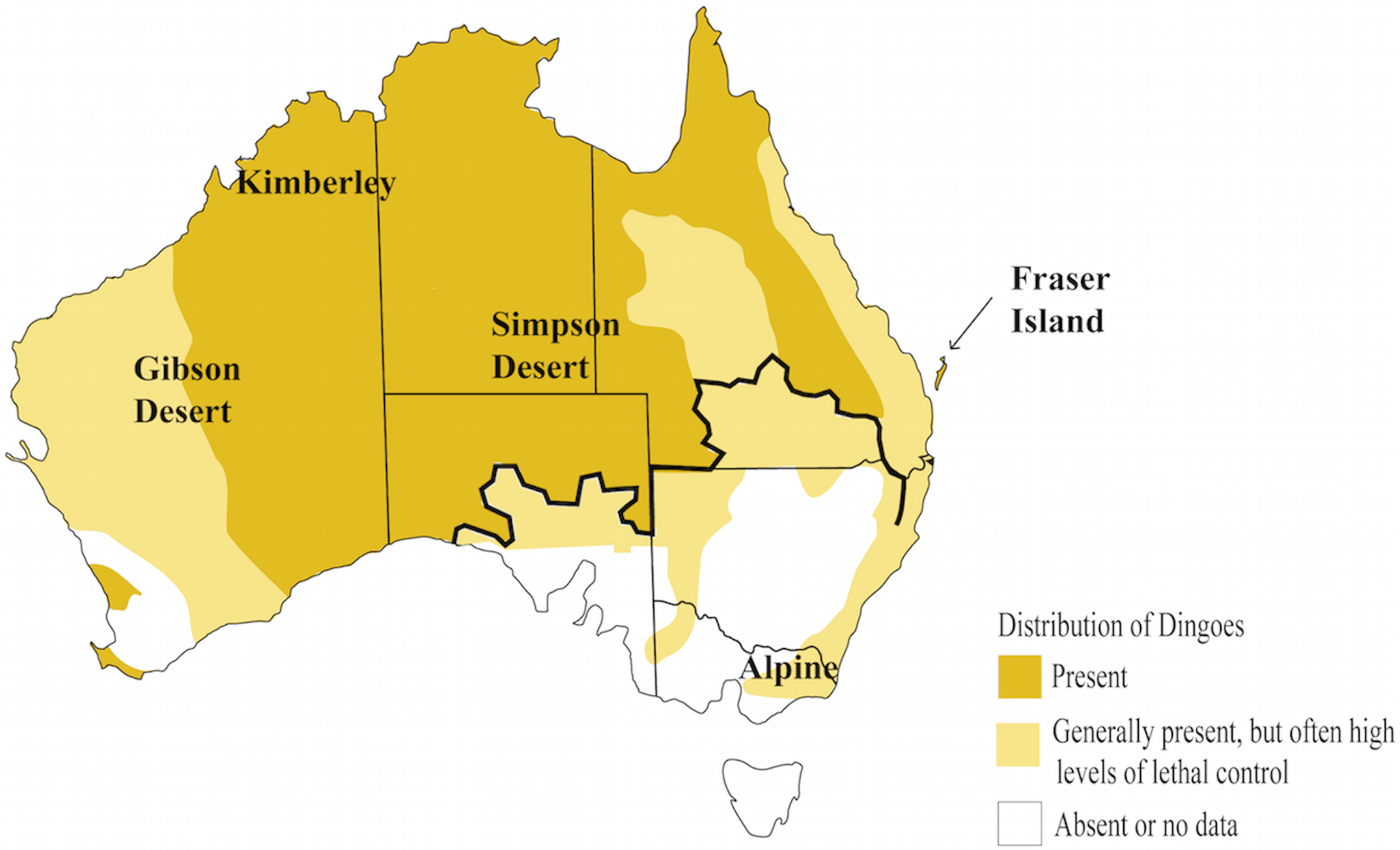
- Distribution of dingoes and hybrids. Distribution in New Guinea unknown

Synonyms
- Canis antarticus Kerr, 1792 [suppressed ICZN]; Canis familiaris Linnaeus, 1758; Canis familiaris australasiae Desmarest, 1820; Canis familiaris dingo Meyer, 1793; Canis lupus dingo; Canis australiae Gray, 1826; Canis dingo Meyer, 1793; Canis dingoides Matschie, 1915; Canis macdonnellensis Matschie, 1915; Canis familiaris novaehollandiae Voigt, 1831; Canis papuensis Ramsay, 1879; Canis tenggerana Kohlbrugge, 1896; Canis hallstromi Troughton, 1957; Canis harappensis Prashad, 1936

= Canis lupus dingo =

Canis lupus dingo Temporal range: Holocene (3,450 years BP – Recent)

Subspecies of canine

Canis lupus dingo is a taxonomic rank that includes both the dingo that is native to Australia and the New Guinea singing dog that is native to the New Guinea Highlands. It also includes some extinct dogs that were once found in coastal Papua New Guinea and the island of Java in the Indonesian Archipelago.

It is included in the taxonomic treatment presented in the third edition of Mammal Species of the World (2005). In this treatment, it is a subspecies of Canis lupus (the wolf), with the domestic dog treated as a different wolf subspecies. However, other treatments consider the dog as a full species, with the dingo and its relatives either as a subspecies of the dog (as Canis familiaris dingo), a species in its own right (Canis dingo), or simply as an unnamed variant or genetic clade within the larger population of dogs (thus, Canis familiaris, not further differentiated).

The genetic evidence indicates that the dingo clade originated from East Asian domestic dogs and was introduced through the Malay Archipelago into Australia, with a common ancestry between the Australian dingo and the New Guinea singing dog. The New Guinea singing dog is genetically closer to those dingoes that live in southeastern Australia than to those that live in the northwest.

== Taxonomic debate – the domestic dog, dingo, and New Guinea singing dog ==
=== Nomenclature ===
Zoological nomenclature is a system of naming animals. In 1758, the Swedish botanist and zoologist Carl Linnaeus published in his Systema Naturae the two-word naming of species (binomial nomenclature). Canis is the Latin word meaning "dog", and under this genus he listed the domestic dog, grey wolf and the golden jackal. He classified the domestic dog as Canis familiaris, and on the next page he classified the grey wolf as Canis lupus. Linnaeus considered the dog to be a separate species from the wolf because of its upturning tail (cauda recurvata), which is not found in any other canid.

The International Commission on Zoological Nomenclature (ICZN) advises on the "correct use of the scientific names of animals". The ICZN has entered into its official list: Genus Canis in 1926, Canis familiaris as the type species for genus Canis in 1955, and Canis dingo in 1957. These names (such as Canis familiaris and Canis dingo) are then available for use as the correct names for the taxa in question by taxonomists who treat the entities concerned as distinct taxonomic units at species level, rather than as (for example) subtaxa of other species. According to the Principle of Coordination, the same epithets can also be applied at subspecies level, i.e. as the third name in a trinomial name, should the taxonomic treatment being followed prefer such an arrangement.

=== Taxonomy ===
Taxonomy classifies organisms together which possess common characteristics. Nomenclature does not determine the rank to be accorded to any assemblage of animals but only whether or not a particular name is "available" for use, once a particular taxonomic decision has been made. Therefore, zoologists are free to propose which group of animals with similar characteristics that a taxon might belong to. In 1978, a review to reduce the number species listed under genus Canis proposed that "Canis dingo is now generally regarded as a distinctive feral domestic dog. Canis familiaris is used for domestic dogs, although taxonomically it should probably be synonymous with Canis lupus." In 1982, the first edition of Mammal Species of the World included a note under Canis lupus with the comment: "Probably ancestor of and conspecific with the domestic dog, familiaris. Canis familiaris has page priority over Canis lupus" [in fact this is irrelevant: page priority is not a concept that exists any more in zoological nomenclature] "but both were published simultaneously in Linnaeus (1758), and Canis lupus has been universally used for this species".

In 1999, a study of the maternal lineage through the use of mitochondrial DNA (mtDNA) as a genetic marker indicated that the domestic dog may have originated from the grey wolf, with the dingo and New Guinea singing dog breeds having developed at a time when human populations were more isolated from each other. In 2003, the ICZN ruled in its Opinion 2027 that the "name of a wild species ... is not invalid by virtue of being predated by the name based on a domestic form". Additionally, the ICZN placed the taxon lupus as a conserved name on the official list under this opinion, meaning that both this epithet and familiaris are available names (one does not override the other) in the event that a taxonomist wishes to differentiate between the two taxa at species level.

In the third edition of Mammal Species of the World published in 2005, the mammalogist W. Christopher Wozencraft listed under the wolf Canis lupus its wild subspecies, and proposed two additional subspecies: "familiaris Linnaeus, 1758 [domestic dog]" and "dingo Meyer, 1793 [domestic dog]", with the comment "Includes the domestic dog as a subspecies, with the dingo provisionally separate – artificial variants created by domestication and selective breeding. Although this may stretch the subspecies concept, it retains the correct allocation of synonyms." Wozencraft included hallstromi – the New Guinea singing dog – as a taxonomic synonym for the dingo. Wozencraft referred to the mtDNA study as one of the guides in forming his decision. Mammalogists have noted the inclusion of familiaris and dingo together under the "domestic dog" clade, and they debate this classification.

=== Taxonomic debate ===
This classification by Wozencraft is debated among zoologists. Mathew Crowther, Stephen Jackson, and Colin Groves disagree with Wozencraft and argue that based on ICZN Opinion 2027, a domestic animal cannot be a subspecies. Crowther, Juliet Clutton-Brock and others argue that because the dingo differs from wolves by behaviour, morphology, and because the dingo and dog do not fall genetically within the extant wolf clade, that the dingo should be considered the distinct taxon Canis dingo Meyer 1793. Janice Koler-Matznick and others believe that the New Guinea singing dog Canis hallstromi Troughton 1957 should not be classified under Canis lupus dingo on the grounds that it has behavioural, morphological and molecular characteristics that are distinct from the wolf. Jackson and Groves do not regard the dog Canis familiaris as a taxonomic synonym for (or subspecies of) the wolf Canis lupus, but instead rank them both equally, as distinct species. They also disagree with Crowther, based on the overlap between dogs and dingoes in their morphology, in their ability to easily hybridise with each other, and that they show the signs of domestication by both having a cranium of smaller capacity than their progenitor, the wolf. Given that Canis familiaris Linnaeus 1758 has date priority over Canis dingo Meyer 1793, they regard the dingo as a junior taxonomic synonym for the dog Canis familiaris (i.e. being included within the circumscription of the latter species). Further, the dingo is regarded as a feral dog because it descended from domesticated ancestors. Gheorghe Benga and others support the dingo as a subspecies of the dog as Canis familiaris dingo Meyer 1793, with the domestic dog being the subspecies Canis familiaris familiaris.

In 2008, the palaeontologists Xiaoming Wang and Richard H. Tedford propose that the dog could be taxonomically classified as Canis lupus familiaris under the Biological Species Concept because the dog can interbreed with the grey wolf Canis lupus, and classified as Canis familiaris under the Evolutionary Species Concept because the dog has commenced down a separate evolutionary pathway to the grey wolf.

In 2015, the Taxonomy of Australian Mammals classed the dingo as Canis familiaris. In 2017, a review of the latest scientific information proposes that the dingo and New Guinea singing dog are both types of the domestic dog Canis familiaris. The Australian Government's Australian Faunal Directory lists the dingo under Canis familiaris. In 2018, the taxonomic reference Walker's Mammals of the World recognised the dingo as Canis familiaris dingo. The Australian National Kennel Council recognises a dingo breed standard within its Hounds group.

In 2019, a workshop hosted by the IUCN/SSC Canid Specialist Group considered the New Guinea singing dog and the dingo to be feral dogs Canis familiaris, and therefore should not be assessed for the IUCN Red List.

In 2020, the American Society of Mammalogists considered the dingo a synonym of the domestic dog.

=== Genomic evidence ===
The sequencing of ancient dog genomes indicates that dogs share a common ancestry and descended from an ancient, now-extinct wolf population – or closely related wolf populations – which was distinct from the modern wolf lineage. By the close of the last ice age 11,700 years ago, five ancestral lineages had diversified from each other and were expressed in ancient dog samples found in Karelia (10,900 YBP), Lake Baikal (7,000 YBP), the Levant (7,000 YBP), ancient America (4,000 YBP), and in the New Guinea singing dog (present day). The dingo is a basal member of the domestic dog clade. "The term basal taxon refers to a lineage that diverges early in the history of the group and lies on a branch that originates near the common ancestor of the group." Mitochondrial genome sequences indicates that the dingo falls within the domestic dog clade, and that the New Guinea singing dog is genetically closer to those dingoes that live in southeastern Australia than to those that live in the northwest.

== Taxonomic synonyms ==
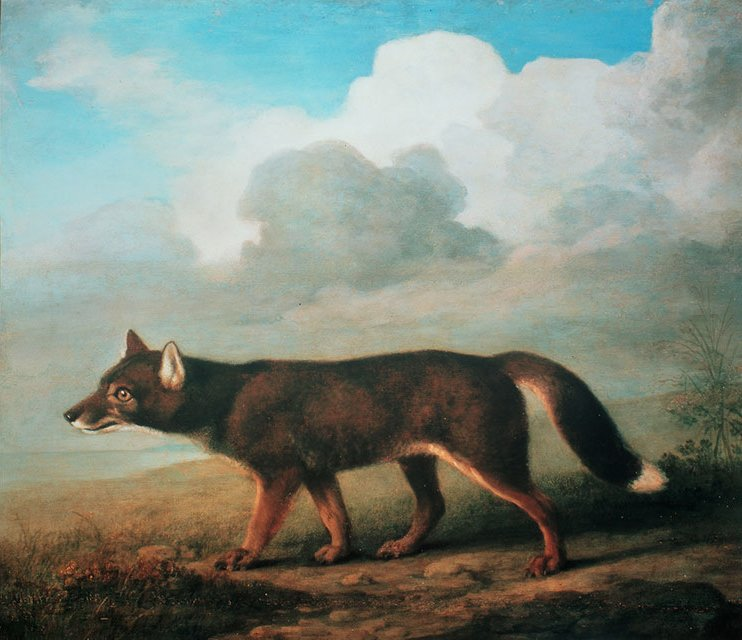
"Portrait of a Large Dog from New Holland" by George Stubbs, 1772

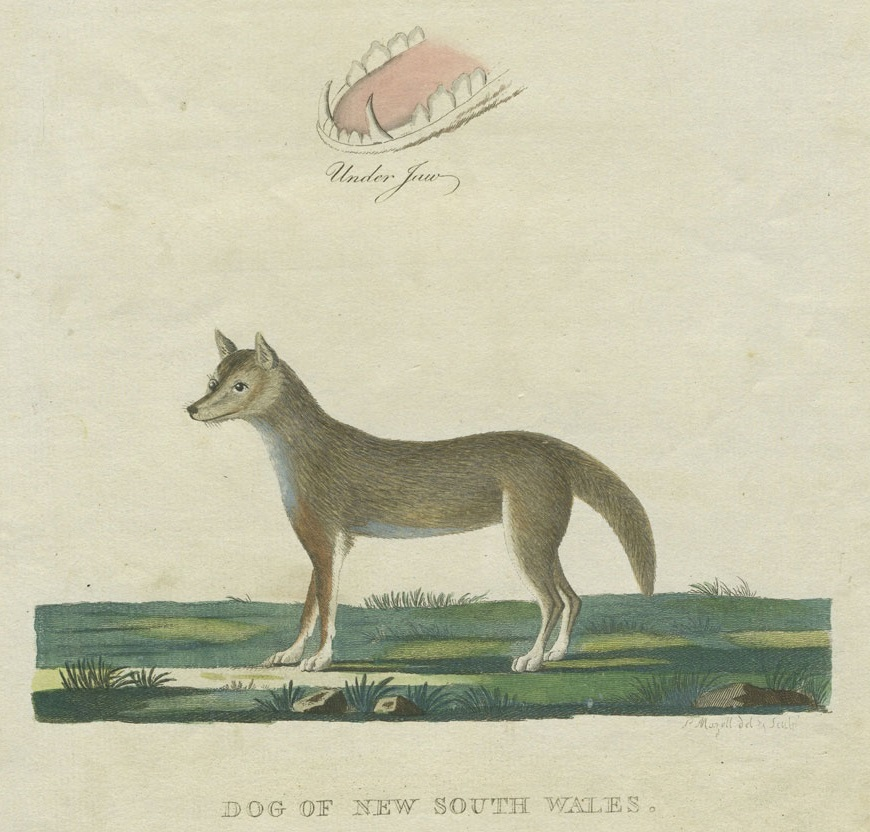
"Dog of New South Wales" illustrated in The Voyage of Governor Phillip to Botany Bay in 1788.

A taxonomic synonym is a name that applies to a taxon that now goes by a different name. In 2005, W. Christopher Wozencraft in the third edition of Mammal Species of the World listed under the wolf Canis lupus the subspecies dingo along with its proposed taxonomic synonyms:

dingo Meyer, 1793 [domestic dog]; antarticus Kerr, 1792 [suppressed, ICZN, O.451]; australasiae Desmarest, 1820; australiae Gray, 1826; dingoides Matschie, 1915; macdonnellensis Matschie, 1915; novaehollandiae Voigt, 1831; papuensis Ramsay, 1879; tenggerana Kohlbrugge, 1896; hallstromi Troughton, 1957; harappensis Prashad, 1936.

These are all equivalent to (or included within) the subspecies Canis lupus dingo according to this treatment. Of the 10 available (not suppressed) proposed names, the majority refer to the Australian dingo, one to the New Guinea singing dog, and three refer to extinct dogs that were once found in the Indonesian archipelago and Southern Asia.

=== Canis dingo, Australian dingo ===
For the taxon Canis dingo (or Canis lupus dingo, or Canis familiaris dingo, or simply included within Canis familiaris without further differentiation, according to different authorities), the following taxa are regarded as its taxonomic synonyms located in Australia: antarticus [suppressed], Canis familiaris australasiae, Canis australiae, Canis dingoides, Canis macdonnellensis, Canis familiaris novaehollandiae.

In 1768, James Cook took command of a scientific voyage of discovery from Britain to New Holland, which was the name for Australia at that time. In 1770, his ship HMS Endeavour arrived in Botany Bay, which is now part of Sydney. The mission made notes and collected specimens for taking back to Britain. On return to Britain, Joseph Banks commissioned George Stubbs to produce paintings based on his observations, one of which was the "Portrait of a Large Dog from New Holland" completed in 1772.

In 1788, the First Fleet arrived in Botany Bay under the command of Australia's first colonial governor, Arthur Phillip, who took ownership of a dingo and in his journal made a brief description with an illustration of the "Dog of New South Wales". In 1793, based on Phillip's brief description and illustration, the "Dog of New South Wales" was classified by Friedrich Meyer as Canis dingo. Johann Friedrich Blumenbach gathered together a collection from the Cook voyage and in 1797 he also classified the "New Holland dog" as Canis familiaris dingo.

In 1947, it was discovered that Meyer's taxon Canis dingo had been named already, as the "New Holland dog" Canis antarticus [sic] Kerr, 1792 in a little-known work, which therefore had priority over Meyer's name (both Kerr and Meyer had based their names on Phillip's brief description and illustration of the "Dog of New South Wales"). In 1957, the ICZN was asked to suppress the epithet antarticus on the grounds that dingo was more in keeping with the common name that had been used for over 150 years. The ICZN found in favour of dingo Meyer 1793 and suppressed the use of the name antarticus Kerr, 1792 in this context, that is, whenever dingo is considered a distinct taxon (at either subspecies or species level) from familiaris and/or lupus.

=== Canis hallstromi, New Guinea singing dog ===
The New Guinea singing dog or New Guinea Highland dog was originally described as a separate species, Canis hallstromi Troughton, 1957. The Australian mammalogist Ellis Troughton classified this rare dog that is native to the New Guinea Highlands on the island of New Guinea.

=== Canis papuensis, Papua New Guinea ===
The "Papuan dog" was originally described as Canis familiaris var. papuensis by Ramsay, 1879 (this name later stated to be a nomen nudum), and then Canis papuensis by Miklouho-Maclay in 1881. The Russian biologist Nicholas De Miklouho-Maclay compared the dingo with a Papuan dog specimen from Bonga Village, 25 km north of Finschhafen, on the Maclay Coast in Papua New Guinea. He noted that compared to the dingo, this dog was smaller, did not have the bushy tail, had some parts of the brain that were comparatively smaller, and was very timid and howled rather than barked. These dogs are sometimes fed by their owners, but at other times can found on reefs at low tide hunting for crabs and small fish. At night, along with the pigs, they clean up any refuse left in the village. Rarely do they go hunting with their owners. Jackson and Groves propose that Canis papuensis may refer to feral dogs.

=== Canis tenggerana, Java ===
The "Tengger dog" was originally described as Canis tenggerana Kohlbrugge, 1896. The Dutch physician and anthropologist Jacob Kohlbrügge noted this canid while working in the Tennger Mountains in eastern Java. The status of the Tengger dog as being wild or domesticated is not clear. It has been described as a bush-dwelling dog, although its morphology shows no wild adaptation and it has also been described as easy to domesticate. A similar dog existed in the Dieng highlands, and it is assumed that pure populations of these two dogs no longer exist due to crossbreeding with European breeds of the domestic dog. Another view is that these dogs were rare at the time of discovery, could not survive on the hot lowlands and therefore could not be bred with local dogs, and shared a similar unique leg structure with the dingo. Jackson and Groves disagree with Wozencraft, and believe that this taxon does not closely resemble the dingo.

=== Canis harappensis, Southern Asia ===
The "Harappa dog" was originally described as Canis harappensis Prashad, 1936. The Indian zoologist Baini Prashad noted the remains of a dog that was discovered during excavations at Harappa, in modern Pakistan. The researchers collected a wide variety of ancient domestic animal remains which had been buried for 5,000 years. Also found was a dog skull; however, its location and depth was not recorded and its age is not known. It is described as being moderately large in size and with an elongated and pointed snout. It showed a close affinity with the Indian pariah dog; however, a comparison of skull morphology showed that the pariah dog skull was closer to the Indian jackal, but the Harappa dog was closer to the Indian wolf. It is described as being morphologically similar to Canis tenggerana from Java, and it had earlier been proposed that a population of early dogs had been more widespread across the region. Jackson and Groves disagree with Wozencraft, and believe that this taxon does not closely resemble the dingo.

== Archaeological evidence ==
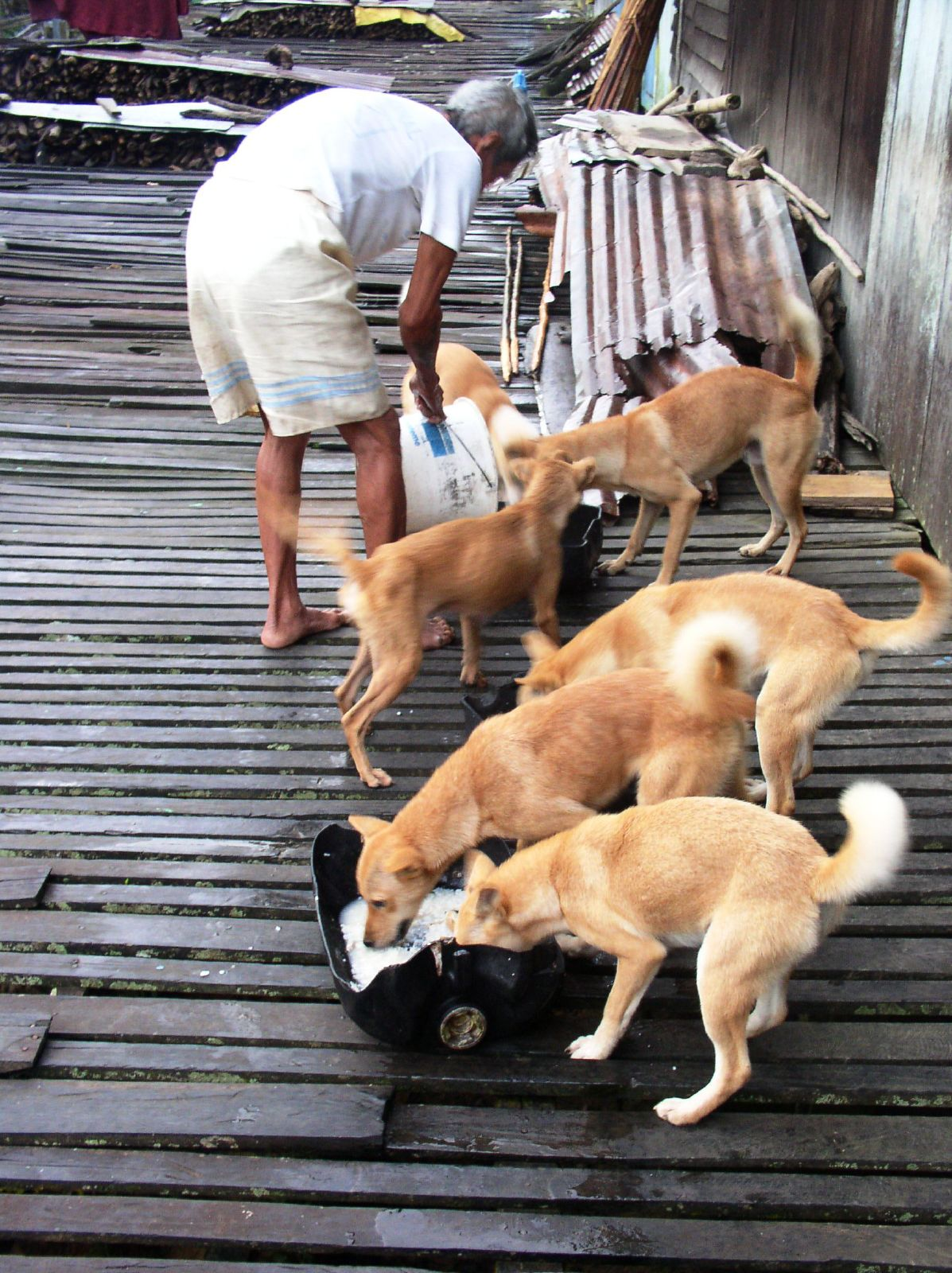
Kalimantan island dogs, Indonesia

In 2020, an mtDNA study of ancient dog fossils from the Yellow River and Yangtze River basins of southern China showed that most of the ancient dogs fell within haplogroup A1b, as do the Australian dingoes and the pre-colonial dogs of the Pacific, but in low frequency in China today. The specimen from the Tianluoshan archaeological site, Zhejiang province dates to 7,000 YBP and is basal to the entire haplogroup A1b lineage. The dogs belonging to this haplogroup were once widely distributed in southern China, then dispersed through Southeast Asia into New Guinea and Oceania, but were replaced in China 2,000 YBP by dogs of other lineages. Analysis of dog coprolites from the early rice agricultural site of Tianluoshan 7,000 years ago indicates that their diet was largely plant-based, implying that these dogs associated with early human settlements.

The oldest date for dog remains found in mainland Southeast Asia are from Vietnam dated 4,000 years before present (YBP), and in island southeast Asia from Timor-Leste at 3,075–2,921 YBP. The oldest dog remains from New Guinea are from Caution Bay near Port Moresby dated 2,702-2,573 YBP and the oldest from New Ireland are from Kamgot dated 3,300–3,000. The earliest dingo remains in the Torres Straits date to 2,100 YBP. In New Guinea, no ancient New Guinea singing dog remains have been found.

The earliest dingo skeletal remains in Australia are estimated at 3,450 YBP from the Madura Caves on the Nullarbor Plain, in southeastern Western Australia; 3,320 YBP from Woombah Midden near Woombah, New South Wales; and 3,170 YBP from Fromme's Landing on the Murray River near Mannum, South Australia. Dingo bone fragments were found in a rock shelter located at Mount Burr, South Australia in a layer that was originally dated 7,000-8,500 YBP. Excavations later indicated that the levels had been disturbed, and the dingo remains "probably moved to an earlier level." The dating of these early Australian dingo fossils led to the widely held belief that dingoes first arrived in Australia 4,000 YBP and then took 500 years to disperse around the continent. However, the timing of these skeletal remains were based on the dating of the sediments in which they were discovered, and not the specimens themselves.

In 2018, the oldest skeletal bones from the Madura Caves were directly carbon dated between 3,348–3,081 YBP, providing firm evidence of the earliest dingo and that dingoes arrived later than had previously been proposed. The next most reliable timing is based on desiccated flesh dated 2,200 YBP from Thylacine Hole, 110 km west of Eucla on the Nullarbor Plain, in southeastern Western Australia. When dingoes first arrived, they would have been taken up by Indigenous Australians, who then provided a network for their swift transfer around the continent. Based on the recorded distribution time for dogs across Tasmania and cats across Australia once Indigenous Australians had acquired them, the dispersal of dingoes from their point of landing until they occupied continental Australia is proposed to have taken only 70 years. The red fox is estimated to have dispersed across the continent in only 60–80 years.

Based on a comparison with these early fossils, dingo morphology has not changed over thousands of years. This suggests that there has been no artificial selection over this period and that the dingo represents an early form of dog. They have lived, bred, and undergone natural selection in the wild, isolated from other canines until the arrival of European settlers, resulting in a unique canid.

== Lineage ==
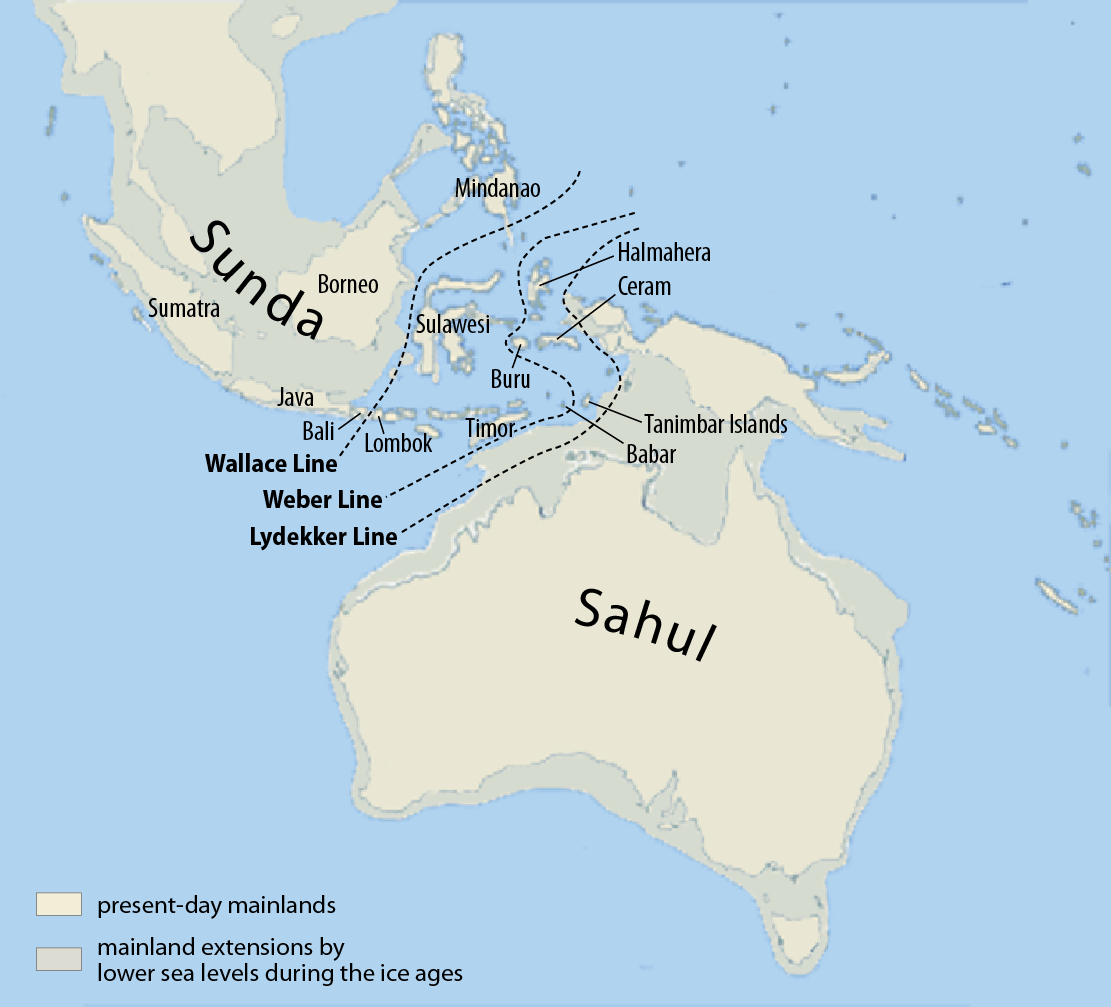
The Sahul Shelf and the Sunda Shelf during the past 12,000 years. Tasmania separated from the mainland 12,000 YBP, New Guinea separated from the mainland 8,500–6,500 YBP.

At the end of the Last Glacial Maximum and the associated rise in sea levels, Tasmania became separated from the Australian mainland 12,000 YBP, and New Guinea 6,500–8,500 YBP by the inundation of the Sahul Shelf. Fossil remains in Australia date to approximately 3,500 YBP and no dingo remains have been uncovered in Tasmania, therefore the dingo is estimated to have arrived in Australia at a time between 12,000 and 3,500 YBP. To reach Australia through the Malay Archipelago even at the lowest sea level of the Last Glacial Maximum, a journey of at least 50 km over open sea between ancient Sunda and Sahul was necessary, indicating that the dingo arrived by boat.

Studies of mtDNA indicate that dingoes are descended from a small founding population through a single founding event or no more than a few founding events either 5,400–4,600 YBP or 10,800–4,600 YBP, or 18,300–4,640 YBP, depending on the mutation rate assumptions used. They remained isolated from other dogs until the arrival of Europeans. However, whole genome sequencing indicates that there was ancient inbreeding in the founding population that first arrived in Australia less than 4,000 YBP.

=== Ancestors ===
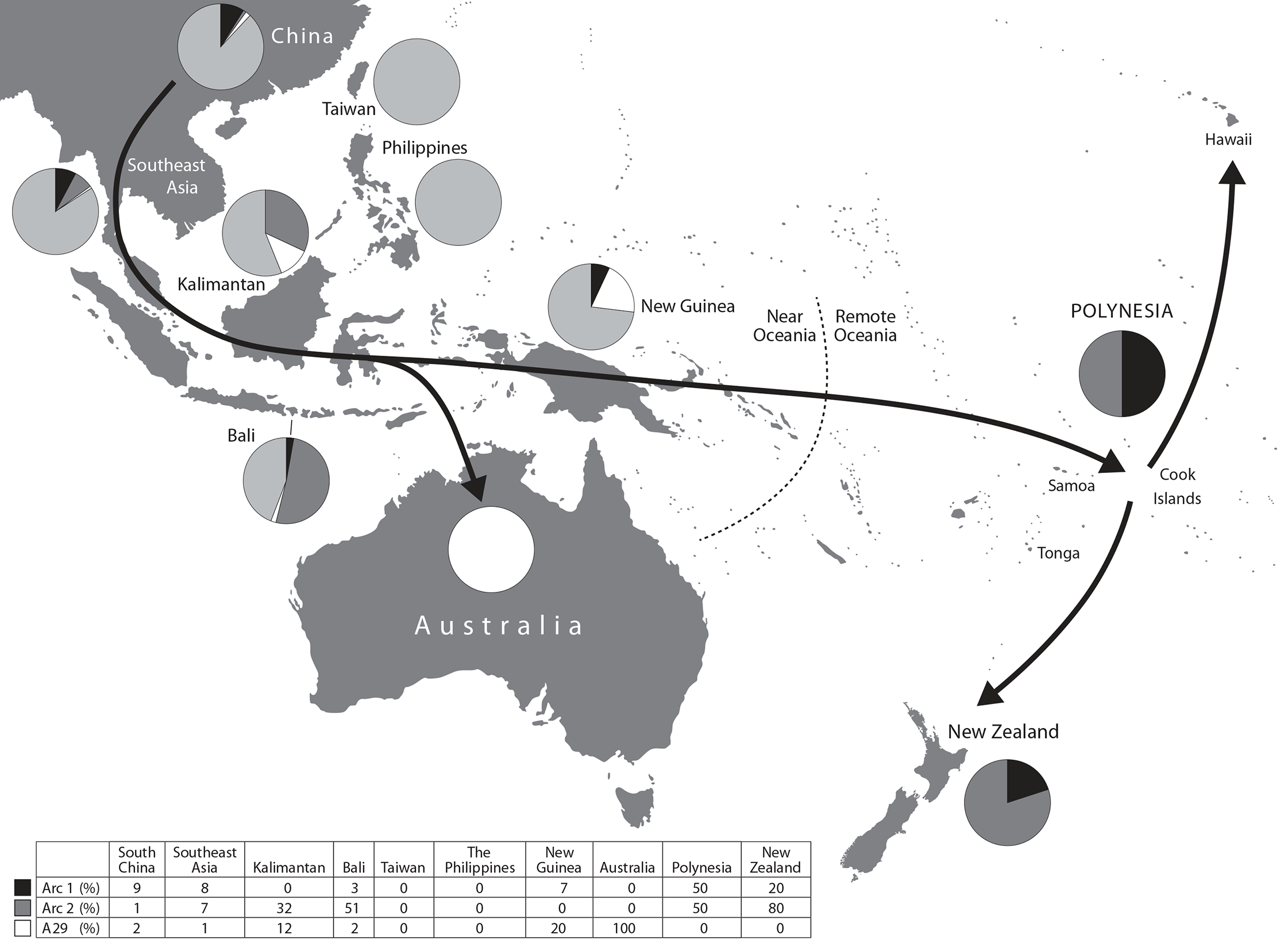
Proposed route for the migration of dogs based on mtDNA. Haplotype A29 relates most to the Australian dingo, the New Guinea singing dog, and some dogs on Kalimantan in Indonesia; the ancient Polynesian Dog haplotype Arc2 to modern Polynesian, Indonesian and ancient New Zealand dogs; and the ancient Polynesian Arc1 is indistinguishable from a number of widespread modern haplotypes.

In 1995, a researcher compared the skull morphology of the dingo to those of other dogs and wolves and concluded that the dingo was a primitive dog that may have evolved from either the Indian wolf (C. l. pallipes) or the Arabian wolf (C. l. arabs). Based on phenotype, the same researcher proposes that in the past, dingoes were widespread across the planet, but had declined due to admixture with domestic dogs. Dingoes were thought to exist in Australia as wild dogs, rare in New Guinea, but common in Sulawesi and in northern and central Thailand. Relic populations were thought to occur in Cambodia, China, India, Indonesia, Laos, Malaysia, Myanmar, Papua New Guinea, the Philippines and Vietnam. However, morphological comparisons (based on skull measurements) had not been undertaken on specimens to provide a better understanding. Later DNA studies indicate this proposed wide distribution to be incorrect.

A haplotype is a group of genes in an organism that are inherited together from a single parent. Early DNA studies indicated that the dingo was more closely related to the domestic dog than it was to the wolf or the coyote. In 2004, a study compared the DNA sequences of maternal mtDNA taken from Australian dingoes. All dingo sequences in the study fell under the mtDNA haplotype named A29 or were a single mutation from it. All female dingo sequences since studied exhibit haplotype A29, which falls within the Clade A haplogroup that represents 70% of domestic dogs. Haplotype A29 is found in both Australian dingoes and in domestic dogs exclusively in the East Asian region: East Siberia, Arctic America, Japan, Indonesia, New Guinea and in South China, Kalimantan, and Bali. It is associated with the Alaskan Malamute, Alaskan husky, Siberian Husky, and prehistoric dog remains from sites in the Americas. The evidence suggests that the haplotype was introduced from East Asia or southeast Asia through the islands of the Malay Archipelago and into Australia. Haplotype A29 was one of several domestic dog mtDNA haplotypes brought into the Malay Archipelago but of these only A29 reached mainland Australia.

In 2018, a DNA study found evidence that the southeastern dingoes share ancestry with South East Asian dogs, represented by specimens from Borneo and Vietnam, which indicates that southeastern dingoes originated in South East Asia. The northeastern dingoes share ancestry with European dogs, represented by the Australian Cattle Dog and Portuguese village dogs. The Australian Cattle Dog is believed to possess dingo ancestry, which would explain this result. The northwestern dingo showing a relationship with European dogs when compared with Asian dogs indicates a shared ancestry with dogs from another region, such as India or Java. The two different ancestry-sharing patterns found between the southeastern and northwestern dingo populations provides evidence that these two lineages diverged outside of Australia and had different origins in Asia.

In 2020, the first whole genome analysis of the dingo and the New Guinea singing dog was undertaken. The study indicates that the ancestors of dingo/New Guinea singing dog clade arose in southern East Asia, migrated through Island Southeast Asia 9,900 YBP, and reached Australia 8,300 YBP brought by an unknown human population.

=== Sisters ===
In 2011, a study compared the mtDNA of the Australian dingo with that of the New Guinea singing dog. The mtDNA haplotype A29, or a mutation one step away, was found in all of the Australian dingoes and New Guinea singing dogs studied, indicating a common female ancestry.

In 2012, a study looked at the dingo male lineage using Y chromosome DNA (yDNA) as a genetic marker and found 2 yDNA haplotypes. A haplotype named H3 could be found in domestic dogs in East Asia and Northern Europe. Haplotype H60 had not been previously reported; however, it was one mutation away from haplotype H5 that could be found in East Asian domestic dogs. Only the New Guinea singing dog and dingoes from northeastern Australia showed haplotype H60, which implies a genetic relationship and that the dingo reached Australia from New Guinea. Haplotype H60 and H3 could be found among the southern Australian dingoes with H3 dominant, but haplotype H3 could only be found in the west of the continent and may represent a separate entry from the northwest.

The existence of a genetic subdivision within the dingo population has been proposed for over two decades but has not been investigated. In 2016, a study compared the entire mtDNA genome, and 13 loci of the cell nucleus, from dingoes and New Guinea singing dogs. Their mtDNA provided evidence that they all carried the same mutation inherited from a single female ancestor in the past, and so form a single clade. Dogs from China, Bali and Kalimantan did not fall within this clade. There are two distinct populations of dingoes in Australia based on both mtDNA and nuclear evidence. The dingoes found today in the northwestern part of the Australian continent are estimated to have diverged 8,300 YBP followed by a divergence of the New Guinea singing dog 7,800 YBP from the dingoes found today in the southeastern part of the Australian continent. As the New Guinea singing dog is more closely related to the southeastern dingoes, these divergences are thought to have occurred somewhere in Sahul (a landmass which once included Australia, New Guinea and some surrounding islands). The New Guinea singing dog then became a distinct, but closely related, lineage. The Fraser Island dingoes are unique because they cluster with the southeastern dingoes, but exhibit many alleles (gene expressions) similar to the New Guinea singing dog, in addition to showing signs of admixture with the northwestern dingoes.

These dates suggest that dingoes spread from Papua New Guinea to Australia over the land bridge at least twice. The lack of fossil evidence from northern Australia and Papua New Guinea can be explained by their tropical climate and acidic soil, as there are generally few fossils found in these regions. In 2017, a study of dingoes across a wider area found that the New Guinea singing dog female lineage is more closely related to the southeastern dingoes, and its male lineage is more closely related to dingoes found across the rest of the continent, indicating that the dingo lineage has a complex history.

The dates are well before the human Neolithic Expansion through the Malay Peninsula around 5,500 YBP, and therefore Neolithic humans were not responsible for bringing the dingo to Australia. The Neolithic included gene flow and the expansion of agriculture, chickens, pigs and domestic dogs – none of which reached Australia. There is no evidence of gene flow between Indigenous Australian and early East Asian populations. The AMY2B gene produces an enzyme that helps to digest amylase (starch). Similar to the wolf and the husky, the dingo possesses only two copies of this gene, which provides evidence that they arose before the expansion of agriculture. Y chromosome DNA indicates that the dingo male lineage is older than Malay Peninsula dogs. This provides evidence that the dingo arrived in Australia before the Neolithic expansion.

In 2020, the first whole genome analysis of the dingo and the New Guinea singing dog indicated that they cluster together separate from other dogs, the New Guinea singing dog was separate to other dingoes, and the dingo formed three sub-populations of Northeast, Southeast, and West/Central Australia.

=== Cousins ===
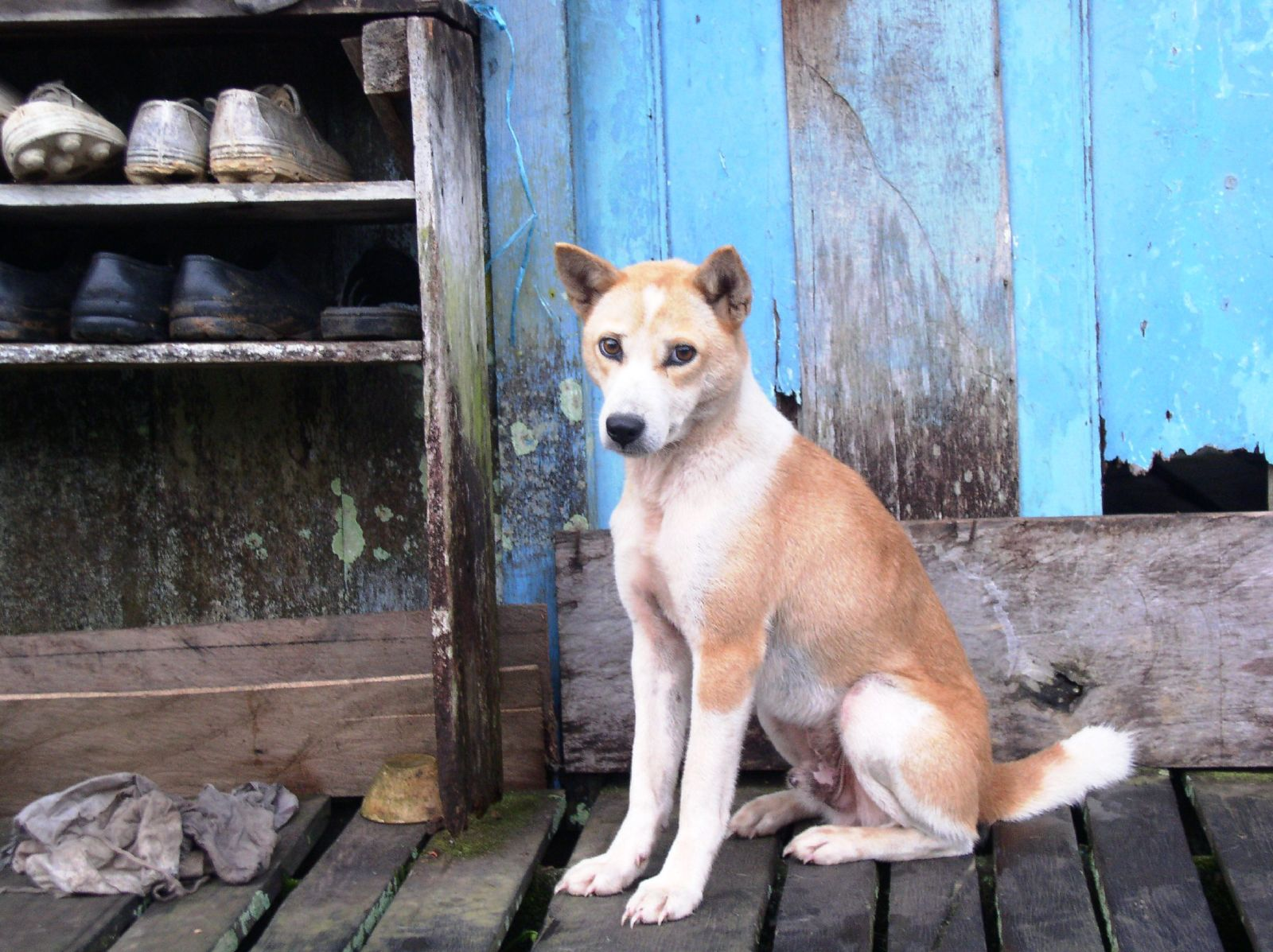
Iban hunting dog, Kalimantan, Indonesia

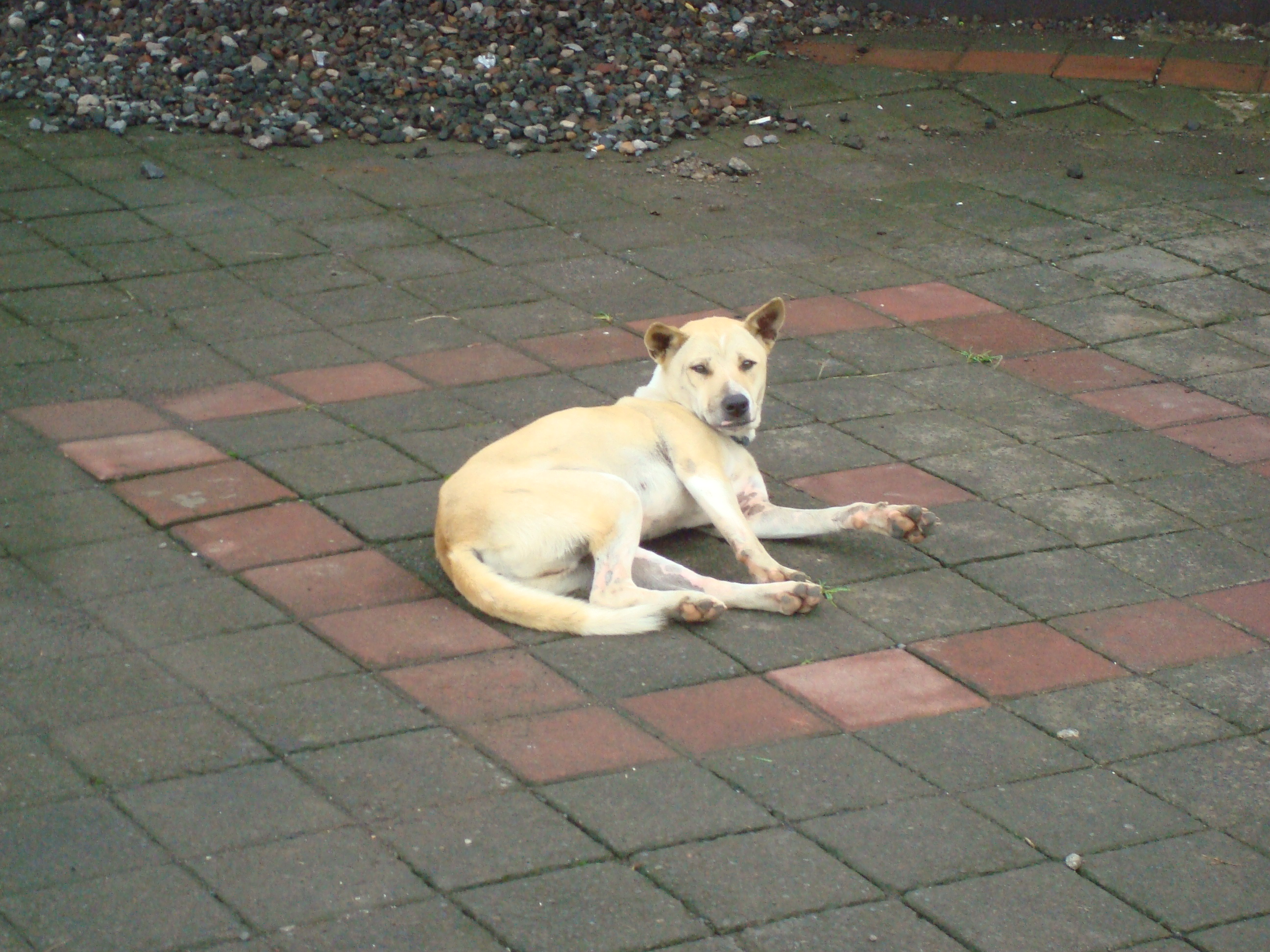
Dog at Gunung Batukaru, Bali, Indonesia

Earlier studies using other genetic markers had found the indigenous Bali dog more closely aligned with the Australian dingo than to European and Asian breeds, which indicates that the Bali dog was genetically diverse with a diverse history; however, only 1 per cent exhibited the maternal A29 mtDNA haplotype. In 2011, the mtDNA of dogs from the Malay Peninsula found that the two most common dog haplotypes of the Indonesian region, in particular Bali and Kalimantan, was mtDNA haplotype A75 (40%) and "the dingo founder haplotype" A29 (8%). However, in 2016 a study using the mitochondrial genome that provided much longer mtDNA sequences showed that for the A29 haplotype, the dogs from China, Bali and Kalimantan did not fall within the same clade as the dingo and New Guinea singing dog.

In 2013, yDNA was used to compare Australian dingoes, New Guinea singing dogs, and village dogs from Island Southeast Asia. The Bali dogs support the arrival of their ancestors with the Austronesian expansion and the arrival of other domesticates 4,500–3,000 YBP. The data confirms that dingoes carry the unique yDNA haplogroup (H60) and it has been derived from yDNA haplogroup H5. Haplogroup H5 was not found in the village dogs from Island Southeast Asia, but it is common in Taiwan. One H5 specimen from Taiwan clustered with one H60 from Australia with the indication of a common ancestor 5,000–4000 YBP and coincides with the expansion of the Daic peoples of southern China. The conclusion is that there were two expansions of two types of dogs. Southern China produced the first ancient regional breeds 8,000 years ago, from which they expanded. These were then dominated and replaced by a later explosive expansion of genetically diverse dogs that had been bred in Southeast Asia. If so, the dingo and the New Guinea singing dog, which pre-dates the dogs of Island Southeast Asia, would reflect the last vestiges of the earlier ancient breeds.

=== Wolf admixture ===
Some dog breeds, including the dingo and the Basenji, are almost as genetically divergent from other dogs as the dog is from the wolf; however, this distinctiveness could be reflecting geographic isolation from the admixture that later occurred in other dogs in their regions. Their ancestral lineages diverged from other dogs 8,500 years ago (or 23,000 years ago using another method of timing estimate). Gene flow from the genetically divergent Tibetan wolf forms 2% of the dingo's genome, which likely represents ancient admixture in eastern Eurasia.

== Bibliography ==
- Fleming, P.; Corbett, L.; Harden, R.; Thomson, P. (2001). Managing the impacts of dingoes and other wild dogs. Bureau of Rural Sciences, Canberra. ISBN 978-0-642-70494-8.
- Smith, Bradley (2015). The Dingo Debate: Origins, Behaviour and Conservation. Csiro Publishing. ISBN 978-1-4863-0031-0.
