= Yuli Ofer =

Israeli businessman (1924–2011)

Yuli Ofer יולי עופר
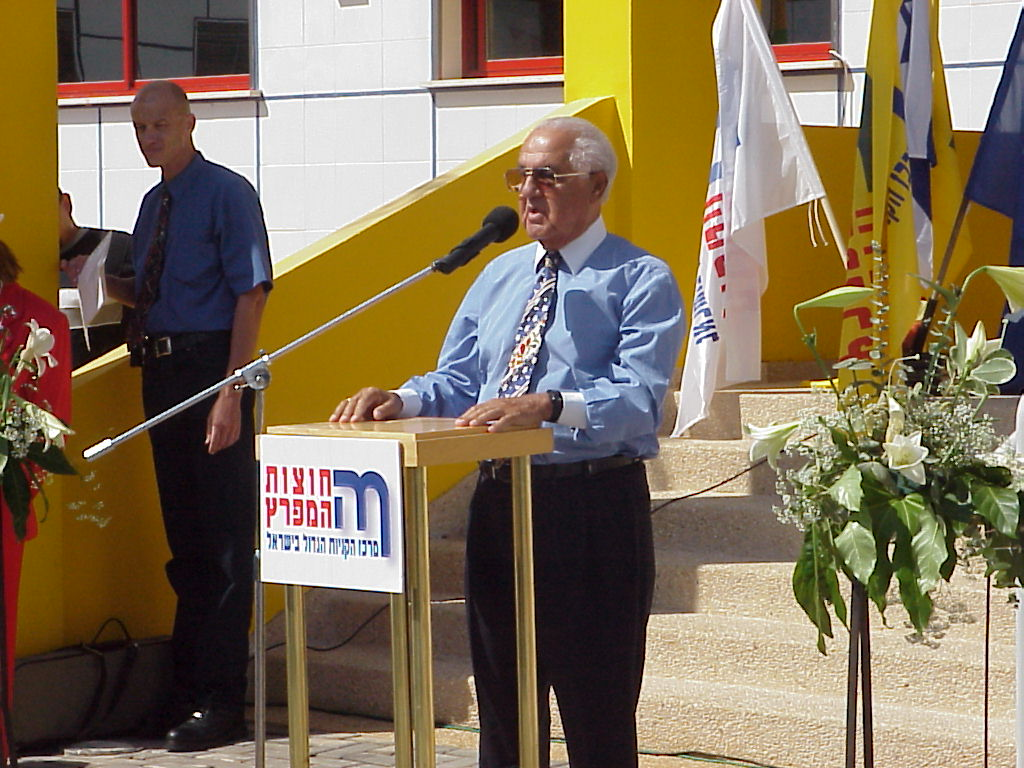
- Born: 1924; Galați, Romania
- Died: 11 September 2011 (aged 86–87); Herzliya, Israel
- Occupations: Businessman and shipping tycoon
- Children: Doron Ofer, Liora Ofer
- Relatives: Sammy Ofer (brother); Idan and Eyal Ofer (nephews)

Judah "Yuli" Ofer (Hebrew: יולי עופר; 1924 – September 11, 2011) was an Israeli businessman in real estate and industry, and one of the wealthiest people in Israel. A member of the Ofer family, the annual Forbes magazine's list of The World's Billionaires estimated in 2011 his fortune, together with that of his elder brother Sammy, to be $10.3 billion, ranked him in 2011 as the 79th in wealthiest people in the world, and the wealthiest man in Israel.

== Life and career ==
Yuli Ofer was born in 1924 in Romania. The Ofer family immigrated to Mandate Palestine while Yuli was six months old. The family lived in Haifa. Yuli Ofer served in the Israel Defense Forces in infantry and ended his relatively long military career at the rank of major. Afterwards he began his business career in Haifa, where he supplied equipment for ships and along with his brother Sammy they both established the Ofer Brothers Group. In 1956 he and Sammy established the shipping company "Mediterranean routes".

During the 1960s and 1970s the Ofer Brothers Group became an international shipping company as Yuli Ofer became in charge of conducting the company's operations in Israel and Sammy Ofer became in charge of conducting the company's international operations. In the 1980s the Ofer Brothers Group began getting into the tanker industry in Hong Kong and Singapore. With time they also established a subsidiary company which focused on cruise ships named "Royal Caribbean". In 1994 the Ofer Brothers were among the purchasers of the controlling interest in the Mizrahi Bank, and in 1999 the family purchased the Israel's largest holding company Israel Corporation and in addition acquired several properties from the Israeli government among them the Oil Refineries in Haifa, Israel Chemicals and Zim Integrated Shipping Services.

Yuli Ofer founded the "Meliseron" company which specializes in real estate and owned several shopping malls in Israel: Ramat Aviv Mall, Renanim Mall, Kiryon Mall and 20 other shopping centers.

In 2002, the Ofer brothers separated their assets: Sammy Ofer's assets in real estate and in the Mizrahi bank was transferred to his brother Yuli, and in exchange Yuli's assets in the Israel Corporation holding company were transferred to Sammy.

== Death ==
Yuli Ofer died on 11 September 2011, aged 87 at his home in Herzliya; his brother Sammy Ofer had died a few months prior. Ofer's death sparked an inheritance dispute between his children Liora and Doron Ofer. In 2008 Yuli Ofer had changed his will to leave most of his assets to his daughter Liora.

== See also ==
- Ofer Brothers Group
