= Eyal Ofer =

Israeli real estate and shipping magnate (born 1950)

- אייל עופר
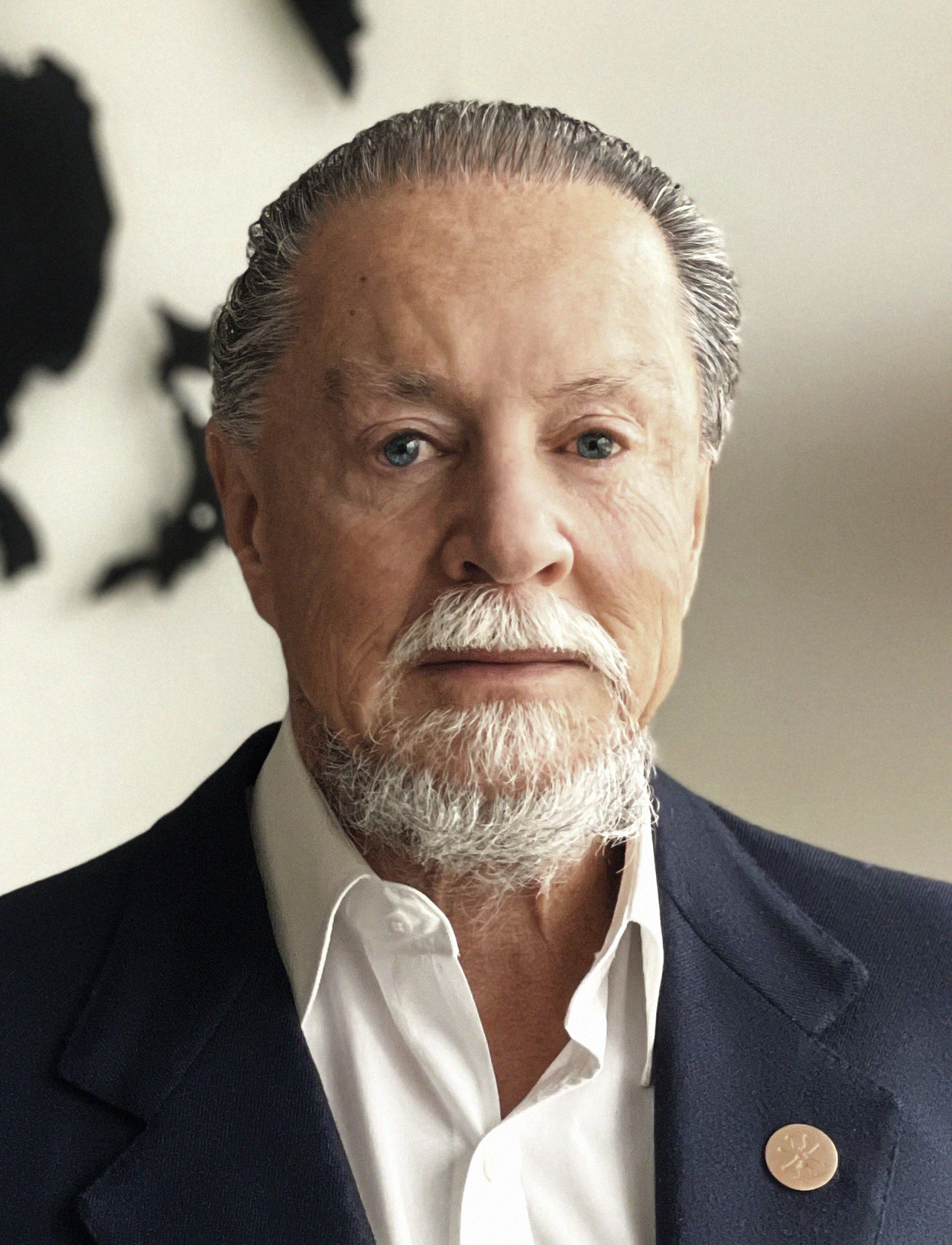
- Ofer in April 2021
- Born: 2 June 1950 (age 76); Haifa, Israel
- Occupations: Chairman, Ofer Global; Chairman, Zodiac Group; Chairman, Global Holdings; Chairman, Eyal & Marilyn Ofer Family Foundation
- Spouse: Marilyn Ofer
- Children: 4
- Parent(s): Sammy Ofer; Aviva Ofer
- Relatives: Yuli Ofer (uncle); Idan Ofer (brother) Liora Ofer (cousin)

Eyal Ofer (Hebrew: אייל עופר; born 2 June 1950) is an Israeli billionaire, philanthropist and art collector, based in Monaco. Born in Israel, he is involved in real estate, energy, technology and shipping. Ofer is the chairman of Ofer Global, Zodiac Group and Global Holdings. As of March 2026, his net worth is estimated by Forbes at US$33.6 billion.

== Early life ==
Ofer was born in 1950 in Haifa, Israel. His father, Sammy Ofer, was a Romanian-born Israeli shipping magnate and once Israel's richest man. Ofer graduated from Atlantic College, an international boarding school affiliated with the United World Colleges, based in St Donat's Castle, Wales. In his teenage years, he spent summers working on one of his family's ships, loading cargo, scraping the boats' sides and repainting them, as well as traveling to international ports.

He served as an intelligence officer in the Israeli Air Force from 1967 to 1973. He then studied Maritime Law at the University of London.

== Career ==
Ofer's business interests are separate from those of his brother, Idan Ofer, operating independently, and are concentrated in shipping, cruise lines and global real estate within the Ofer Global group, a Monaco-based private company focused on shipping, real estate, oil and gas, banking and investments in Europe, North America, the Near East and Asia.

In 2014, he received an honorary lifetime membership of the Baltic Exchange in London in recognition of his contribution to shipping in the UK and global maritime trade. Other recipients of this award have included the Duke of Edinburgh, Winston Churchill, and Maersk Mc-Kinney.

He is "one of the most influential shipowners in the industry”, according to Lloyd’s List, ranking among its 100 most influential people, since 2013, including as tenth in 2016, and seventh in 2014, 2021, and 2022.

He has spoken at industry events, including at the Milken Institute Global Conference in 2012, 2013 and 2015. Ofer also regularly attends the World Economic Forum’s annual meeting in Davos.

In 2018, Ofer joined the Advisory Board of the Bloomberg New Economy Forum.

In November 2024, Bloomberg Billionaires Index reported his net worth to be US$26.5 billion.

=== Real estate ===
Ofer first moved to New York City in 1980 to start the family real estate business, and invested in properties on Park Avenue South, which he rented to law firms and public relations firms through his real estate company, Global Holdings. Over the years, he assembled a real estate empire, having acquired a deep knowledge of ships which had made him comfortable with managing similarly tangible assets.

Ofer is the chairman of Global Holdings, a private real estate holding company specializing in large-scale commercial real estate and high-end residential developments. Its holdings include prime commercial properties in Manhattan, and a controlling stake in Miller Global Properties, a large real estate investment fund focusing on key markets in North America and Europe. He is Miller Global's co-chairman. Global Holdings' commercial projects include, among others, and 120 Park Avenue – the former headquarters of the Altria Group.

Its residential projects include 15 Central Park West, which was described as “the most powerful apartment building in the world” and “the most lucrative”, with quoted apartment sales of approximately $2 billion. It was the subject of a book published in March 2014 by Michael Gross entitled House of Outrageous Fortune: Fifteen Central Park West, the World's Most Powerful Address.

They also include the development at The Greenwich Lane (in partnership with the Rudin family - formerly the site of Saint Vincent's Catholic Medical Center), together with the redevelopment of 18 Gramercy Park South, 520 Park Avenue and 50 United Nations Plaza (all in partnership with Zeckendorf Development). 18 Gramercy Park South (ranked the most expensive Manhattan development in 2013) and 15 Central Park West were designed by architect Robert A. M. Stern. 50 UN Plaza is a 44-story tower designed by London-based architects Foster and Partners. Ofer’s portfolio includes more than 120 properties and over 1,500 hotel rooms.

=== Shipping ===
Ofer started his career in international maritime transportation in all the major shipping segments in the 1980s.

He is the chairman of Zodiac Group, a privately held London-based ship owning and chartering (i.e. leasing) company with a fleet of more than 180 vessels. It is the largest operator of vessels under the Red Ensign by tonnage. Ofer has been a director of Royal Caribbean Cruises, the second largest cruise company in the world, since May 1995 and holds a significant stake in the company.

In 2022, Ofer was ranked 7th in the Lloyd’s List Top 100 Most Influential People in the Shipping Industry. According to Lloyd’s List, "the consensus view from those who know Eyal Ofer best is that he is a man who understands the markets with forensic detail". He controls one of the largest private shipping fleets in the world, and is the third-largest non-operating owner of containerships in the world.

=== Energy ===
Through O.G. Energy, he is involved in energy production, including renewable energy, and the production of green hydrogen. In 2022, he invested in Belgium-based green hydrogen energy startup Tree Energy Solutions (TES), through O.G. Energy. Through O.G. Oil & Gas, the oil and gas arm of Ofer Global's O.G. Energy division, he has exploration and production interests in South East Asia and in Australasia, including a 70% majority stake in New Zealand Oil & Gas (NZOG), acquired in 2017.

In October 2018, O.G. Energy agreed to acquire a 40 per cent stake in Beach Energy’s Otway Basin assets off the south east coast of Australia. In 1990, he also founded OMNI Offshore Terminals, the largest provider of floating production storage and offloading (FSO and FPSO) assets to the offshore oil and gas industry, with headquarters in Singapore.

=== Technology ===
Ofer has interests in technology companies, including Arbe Robotics, through single LP VC fund O.G. Venture Partners, the tech investment arm of Ofer Global. Its $150 million Fund I launched in 2017 to invest in early growth start-ups with disruptive technologies, including SuperPlay, a mobile gaming company acquired by Playtika in 2024 for $700 million plus a contingent amount of up to $1.25 billion, depending on performance over three years.

In 2022, Ofer stated that "Technology has become the global economy’s central nervous system" at the launch of O.G. Venture Partners $400 million Fund II, continuing his focus on early growth stage investments in software tech start-ups.

== Arts ==
Ofer is listed among the top 200 collectors in the world of contemporary, modern, Impressionist and Post-Impressionist art by ARTnews. He inherited half of an extensive collection from his father, including masterpieces by Vincent van Gogh and Pablo Picasso, and continues to expand a significant collection. He is associated with several Arts institutions and is a founding member of the Circle of Friends of Fondation Giacometti in Paris. He is a trustee and on the permanent acquisitions committee for the Museum of Modern Art (MoMA) in New York.

Through his family Foundation, in 2013, he donated £10 million to expand the Tate Modern museum in London. As a result, the exhibition gallery on the third floor bears his name. He gave £1.5 million to the National Maritime Museum to allow it to keep two 18th-century George Stubbs paintings (Portrait of a Large Dog and The Kongouro from New Holland) in the UK after a public appeal by Sir David Attenborough. The Foundation also made a donation of $5 million to the Tel Aviv Museum of Art in 2019 to renovate the Helena Rubinstein Pavilion for Contemporary Art, which reopened as the Eyal Ofer Pavilion in May 2023 with the first retrospective of Swiss sculptor Alberto Giacometti to be shown in Israel.

== Philanthropy ==
Ofer is a supporter of artistic, educational and cultural institutions – including the Tate Modern and the National Maritime Museum in the UK and the Tel Aviv Museum of Art – through the Eyal & Marilyn Ofer Family Foundation, which continues his family's philanthropic tradition. Ofer is chairman of the Foundation.

Ofer was one of the donors to the Gloriana during the Diamond Jubilee of Elizabeth II in 2012.

In 2020, the Eyal Ofer Heart Hospital opened with financial support from Ofer for the Rambam Health Care Campus, which built the new cardiology hospital.

== Personal life ==
He is married to Marilyn Ofer, and they have four children. They reside in Monte Carlo, Monaco. In 2008, they resided in west London and had a home in Herzliya Pituah near Tel Aviv. He also owns an apartment at 15 Central Park West, a building he developed located on the Upper West Side of Manhattan in New York City.
