= Arbe Robotics =

Israeli technology company

Arbe Robotics Ltd.
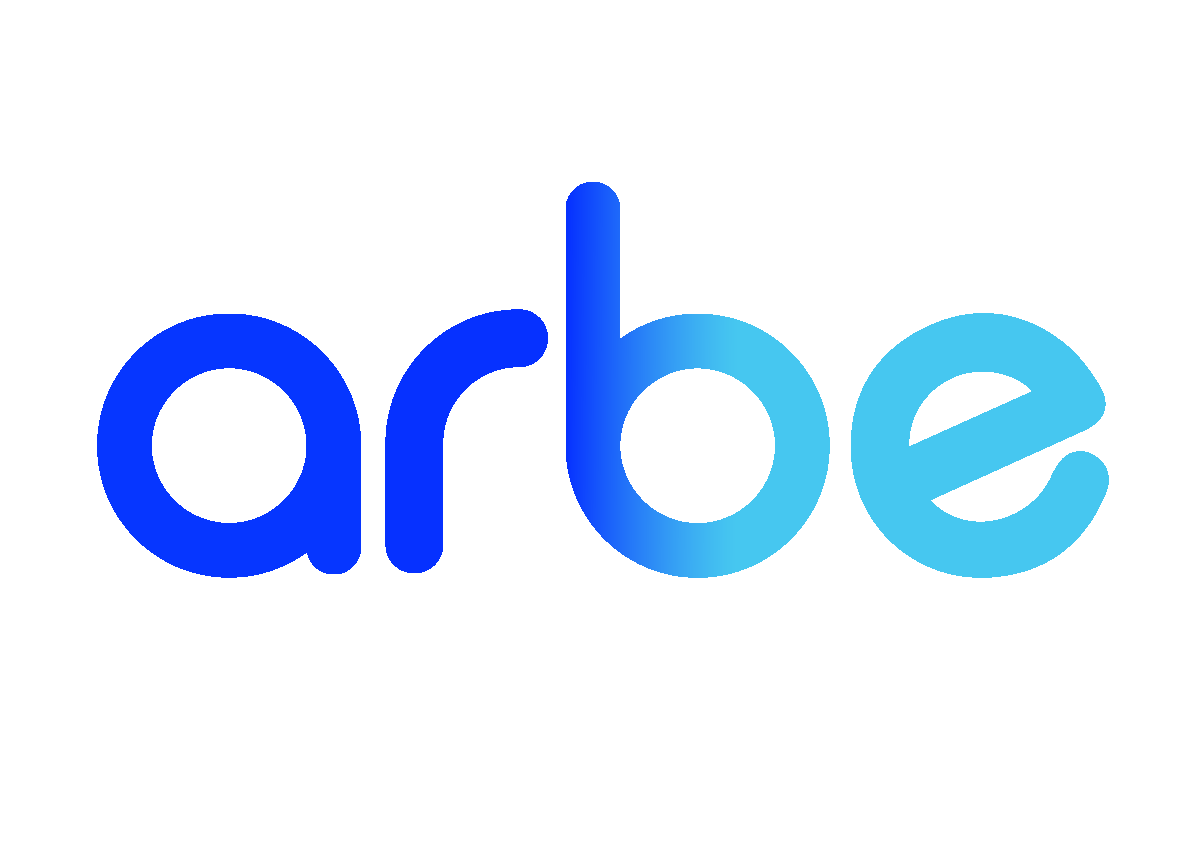
- Type: Public
- Traded as: Nasdaq: ARBE; TASE: ARBE
- Industry: Radar technology
- Founded: November 4, 2015; 10 years ago
- Founders: Kobi Marenko, Noam Arkind, Oz Fixman
- Headquarters: Tel Aviv, Israel
- Number of locations: Israel, United States, China, Germany
- Key people: Ram Machness (CEO), Kobi Marenko (President)
- Number of employees: 144 (2024)
- Website: arberobotics.com

Arbe Robotics Ltd. is an Israeli technology company that develops 4D imaging radar chipsets, systems, and related perception solutions for eyes off driving, autonomous vehicles, robotaxies, defense applications, homeland security, and off road autonomy. Founded in 2015 and headquartered in Tel Aviv, the company is listed on the Nasdaq Stock Market and the Tel Aviv Stock Exchange under the ticker symbol ARBE. Ram Machness has been chief executive officer since April 2026, while co-founder and former CEO Kobi Marenko is president.

== History ==
Arbe was founded on 4 November 2015 in Tel Aviv by Kobi Marenko (Chief Executive Officer), Noam Arkind (Chief Technology Officer), and Oz Fixman (former Chief Operations Officer). The company initially developed radar-based collision-avoidance technology for drones before shifting its focus to high-resolution radar systems for autonomous vehicles.

By 2017, Arbe had developed its first 4D imaging radar prototypes based on a proprietary radar-on-chip design capable of high resolution, wide field of view, and interference mitigation. The company began collaborations with automotive manufacturers (OEMs) and Tier-1 suppliers to integrate its radar into driver-assist and autonomous-driving systems.

In 2017 and 2018, Arbe raised US$9 million and US$10 million, respectively in venture funding rounds led by O.G. Tech, OurCrowd, and other investors. In December 2019, the company secured a US$32 million Series B round. As a private company, Arbe has raised about US$70 million in total from equity investments.

On 7 October 2021, Arbe completed its merger with Industrial Technology Acquisitions, Inc., a special-purpose acquisition company (SPAC). Its shares began trading on Nasdaq on 8 October 2021 under the ticker symbol ARBE. The merger raised approximately US$118 million in gross proceeds.

In June 2023, Arbe raised $23 million through a sale of ordinary shares. Special Situations Funds was the principal investor, purchasing $15 million in shares.

In July 2024, Arbe began dual trading on the Tel Aviv Stock Exchange.

In January 2025, following a rise in its share price after the announcement of a collaboration with Nvidia, Arbe launched a $29 million stock offering.

In April 2026, Ram Machness succeeded Marenko as chief executive officer, while Marenko became president. At the time, Techtime reported that the company was seeking to expand its focus beyond traditional automotive manufacturers to applications including robotaxis, trucks, heavy machinery and defense.

== Technology ==
Arbe develops frequency-modulated continuous-wave radar (FMCW) chipsets for 4D imaging radar. The chipset architecture includes transmitter, receiver and processing components and supports configurations with 48 transmitting and 48 receiving channels. The company also develops the Phoenix 4D Imaging Radar, a high-resolution radar system using 2,304 virtual channels and providing 0.7° azimuth resolution, 0.9° elevation resolution, and a detection range of more than 300 metres. The radar provides data for functions including object detection and tracking, free-space mapping, simultaneous localization and mapping (SLAM), and measurement of range and relative velocity.

In 2025, Arbe received an Innovation Award in the Perception Systems category at the Just Auto Excellence Awards. It was also named Sensor Technology Solution of the Year at the AutoTech Breakthrough Awards.

At CES 2026, Arbe demonstrated radar processing using Nvidia accelerated computing. The demonstration included an AI-based occupancy grid developed with Perciv AI and integration with Nvidia's automotive computing platform.

In September 2026, Arbe introduced Alerion, a 4D imaging radar designed for counter-unmanned aircraft systems (C-UAS). The system is intended to detect and track small drones, including first-person view (FPV), autonomous and fiber-optic-controlled aircraft.

== Partnerships and applications ==
In 2022, Chinese automotive supplier HiRain Technologies used Arbe's radar technology in autonomous-driving and advanced driver-assistance system (ADAS) applications installed on FAW trucks in a pilot project at the Port of Rizhao in China.

In July 2024, an unnamed major automaker selected Arbe's radar chipset for the development of radar systems intended for production vehicles. Later that month, an unnamed European truck manufacturer selected Arbe's technology for a next-generation radar sensor system intended for Level 4 autonomous-driving applications.

In January 2024, Zenseact and Sensrad announced a joint exploration of 4D high-resolution imaging radar technology based on Arbe's chipset to enhance safety in automated driving. At the Beijing International Automotive Exhibition in April 2024, Horizon Robotics and Weifu presented an integration of Weifu's 4D imaging radar, powered by Arbe's chipset, with Horizon's Journey 6 Automotive AI processor. In mid-2024, HiRain Technologies accelerated the development of an advanced driver-assistance system for a Chinese OEM, aiming to replace LiDAR sensors with Arbe's radar technology.

In September 2024, Sensrad signed a framework agreement to supply imaging radar systems based on Arbe's chipset to Tianyi Transportation Technology for a smart-transportation infrastructure project.

In January 2025, Nvidia collaborated with Arbe to integrate its high-resolution radar into the NVIDIA DRIVE AGX in-vehicle computing platform for radar-based free-space mapping and AI-driven perception, presented at the 2025 CES.

In April 2025, HiRain introduced the LRR615 long-range radar based on Arbe's chipset and began providing the system to Chinese automakers for evaluation. In December 2025, a state-owned Chinese automaker selected HiRain's Arbe-based LRR610 radar for a Level 4 autonomous-vehicle program, with series production planned to begin in December 2026.

In 2026, Arbe continued work with Nvidia on radar-based artificial-intelligence perception, including integration of its imaging-radar technology with Nvidia's accelerated computing platform. In August 2026, TechTime reported that Sensrad was working with VirtuRail to integrate imaging radar based on Arbe chipsets into automated vehicles used in tunnel construction.

== Overview ==
Arbe develops semiconductor 4D Imaging Radar chipsets and 4D imaging radar systems for automotive perception. Its proprietary 4D imaging radar technology generates an ultra-high-resolution image of the vehicle's surroundings in range, velocity, azimuth, and elevation.
