= The Kongouro from New Holland =

1772 painting by George Stubbs

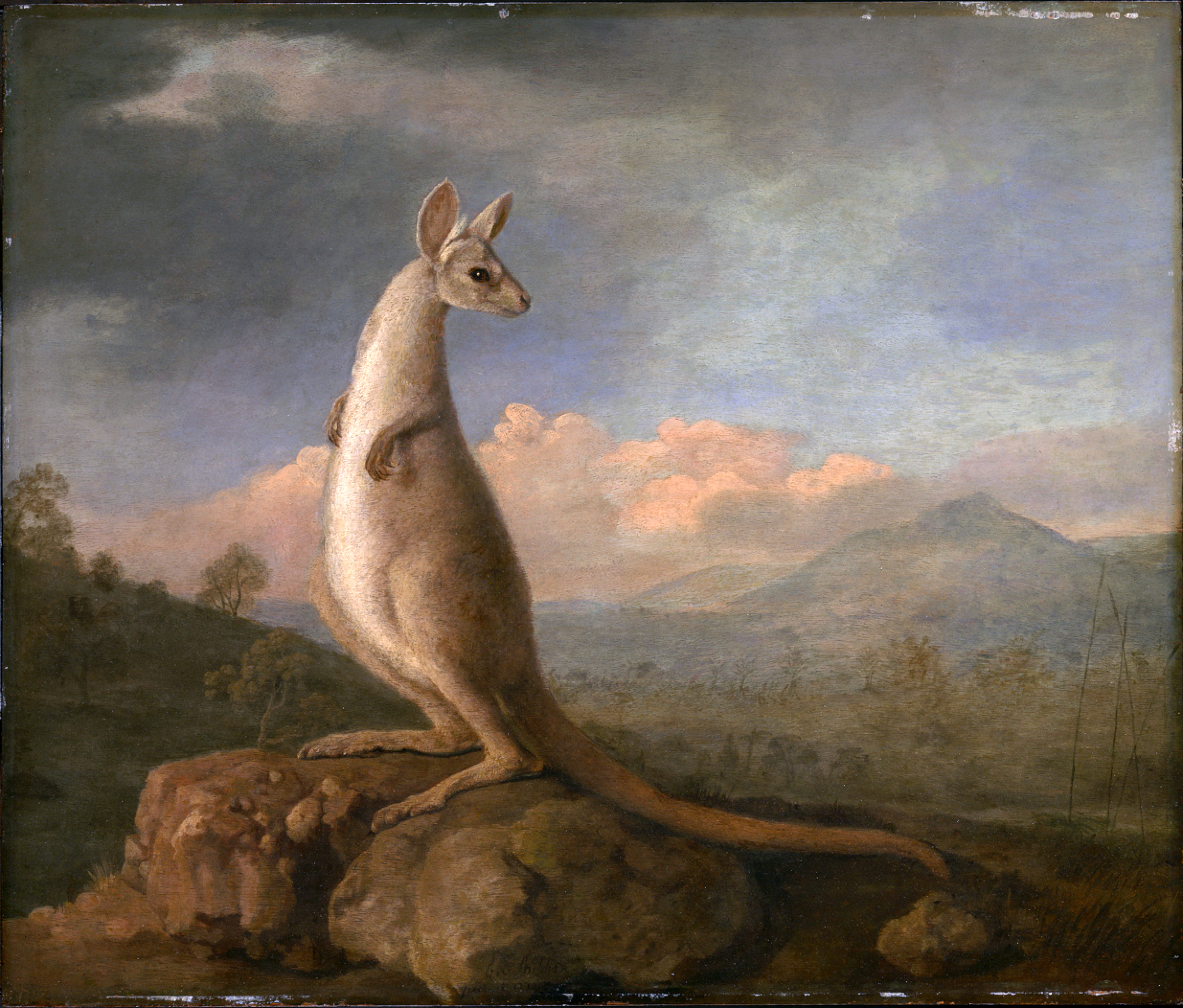
- Artist: George Stubbs
- Year: 1772
- Type: Oil painting
- Dimensions: 60.5 cm × 71.5 cm (23.8 in × 28.1 in)
- Location: National Maritime Museum, Greenwich

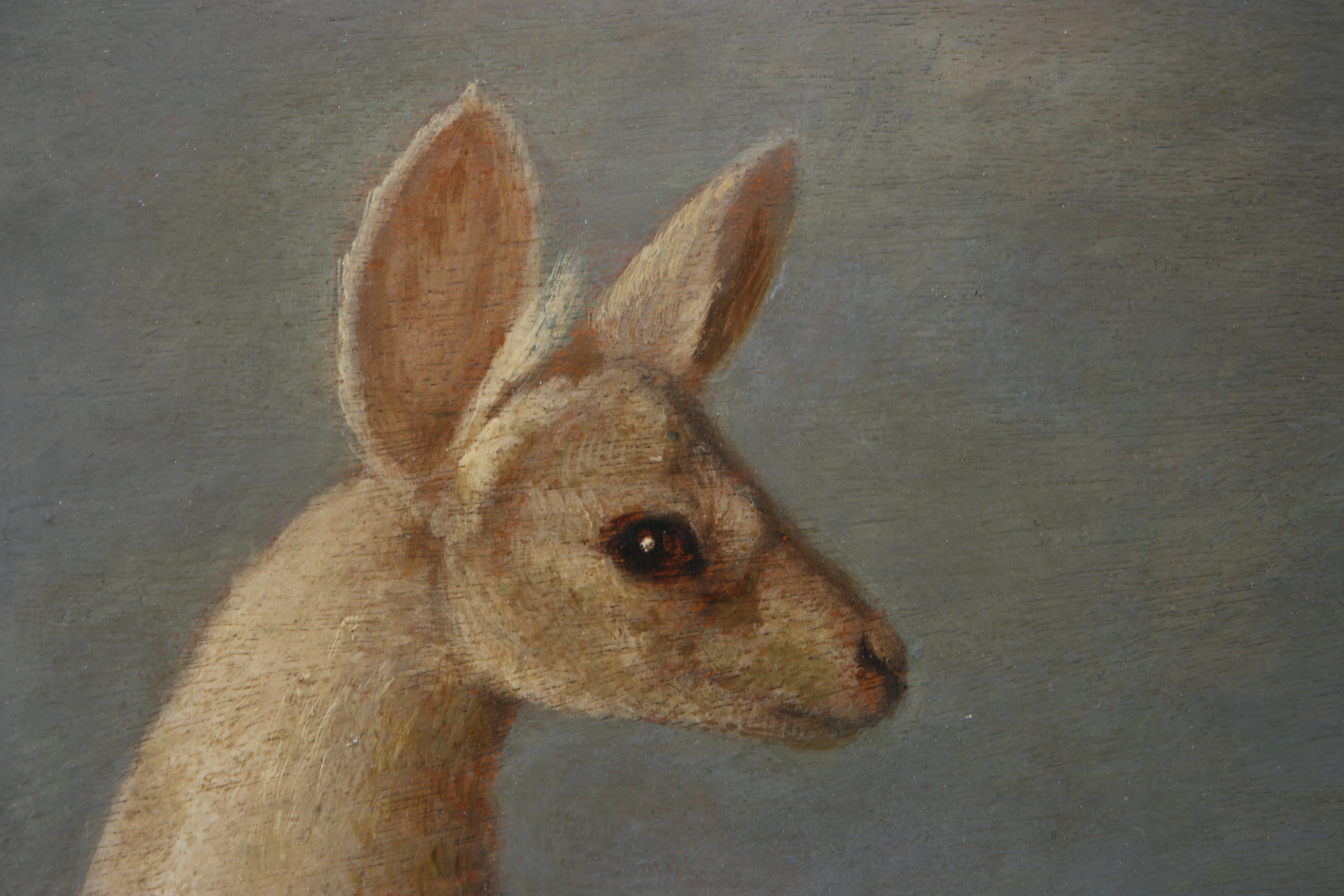
Detail of Kangaroo head.

The Kongouro from New Holland is an oil painting by George Stubbs. Depicting a kangaroo, it is the first painting of an Australian animal in Western art, along with a painting of a dingo—Portrait of a Large Dog—also by George Stubbs. It is part of the collection of the National Maritime Museum in Greenwich, London. The work was commissioned by Joseph Banks and based on the inflated skin of an animal he had collected from the east coast of Australia in 1770 during Lieutenant James Cook's first voyage of discovery. It also seems to be based on Sydney Parkinson's drawing of a kangaroo or common wallaroo; Parkinson was Joseph Banks's botanical illustrator on the first voyage of James Cook. It depicts the animal sitting on a rock and looking over its shoulder with a backdrop of trees and mountains. The two were the only two paintings that Stubbs did not draw from a live subject.

It was first exhibited by the Society of Artists in London in 1773 together with his painting of the dingo, Portrait of a Large Dog. Subsequent exhibitions were held at the Walker Art Gallery in Liverpool in 1951 and the Whitechapel Art Gallery in 1957. The painting has also been on view in recent years at Parham House in Sussex during public openings.

In 2012, The Kongouro from New Holland and Portrait of a Large Dog were purchased together at auction for 9.3 million Australian dollars by an undisclosed buyer. An application to take them to Australia was refused by the Department of Culture on the grounds of their national importance. Sir David Attenborough, who had led a campaign to keep both portraits in Britain, remarked that it was "exciting news that these two pictures, so important in the history of zoological discovery, are to remain where they were commissioned and painted". The National Gallery of Australia had expressed a strong desire to purchase the portraits. In November 2013 it was announced that a £1.5million donation from the Eyal Ofer Family Foundation will enable the National Maritime Museum in Greenwich, London to acquire the two paintings.
