= Portrait of a Large Dog =

1772 painting by George Stubbs

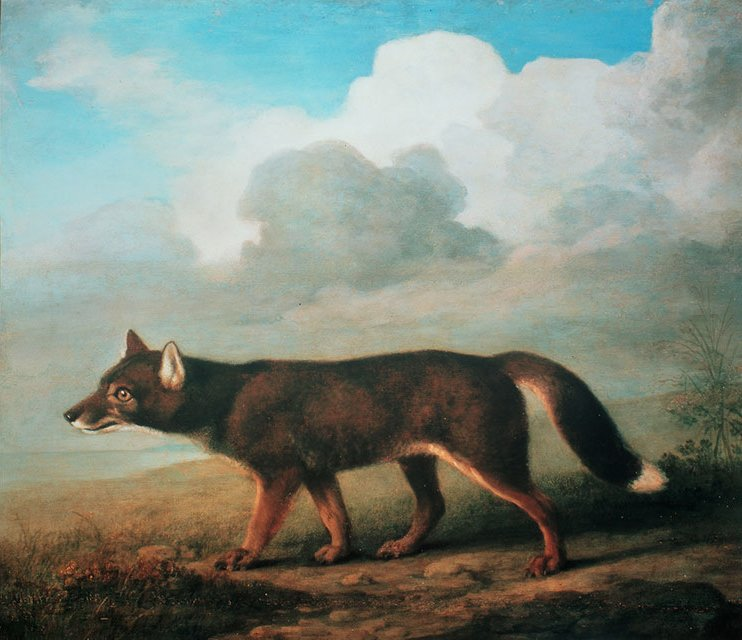
- Artist: George Stubbs
- Year: 1772
- Type: Oil painting
- Dimensions: 61 cm × 71 cm (24 in × 28 in)
- Location: National Maritime Museum, Greenwich

Portrait of a Large Dog is an oil painting depicting a dingo (Canis lupus dingo) by George Stubbs. It is part of the collection of the National Maritime Museum in Greenwich, London. The painting and The Kongouro from New Holland were the first Western paintings of Australian mammals and, in fact, the first time most Europeans had ever seen images of these animals.

The oil painting was commissioned by Joseph Banks based on his observations of dingoes on the east coast of Australia in 1770 during Lieutenant James Cook's first voyage of discovery. No specimen was collected for use as a subject, unlike its companion painting The Kongouro from New Holland, and it is seen as a fairly general depiction of a dingo, soon superseded by more accurate depictions in 1789. The two works were the only paintings that Stubbs, highly regarded in the genre, did not draw from a live subject, although it is one of the few oil paintings to present a scientific specimen.

It was first exhibited by the Society of Artists in London in 1773 together with his painting of a kangaroo, The Kongouro from New Holland. The painting had been on view in recent years at Parham House in West Sussex during public openings.

In 2012, Portrait of a Large Dog and The Kongouro from New Holland were purchased together at auction for 9.3 million Australian dollars by an undisclosed buyer. An application to take them to Australia was refused by the Department for Culture, Media and Sport on the grounds of their national importance. Sir David Attenborough, who had led a campaign to keep both portraits in Britain remarked that it was "exciting news that these two pictures, so important in the history of zoological discovery, are to remain where they were commissioned and painted". The National Gallery of Australia had expressed a strong desire to purchase the portraits. In November 2013 it was announced that a £1.5 million donation from the Eyal Ofer Family Foundation will enable the National Maritime Museum in Greenwich, London to acquire the two paintings.
