= Eden House Hotel, Grantham =

Building of historical significance in Grantham, England

Coordinates: 52.9193°N 0.6466°W

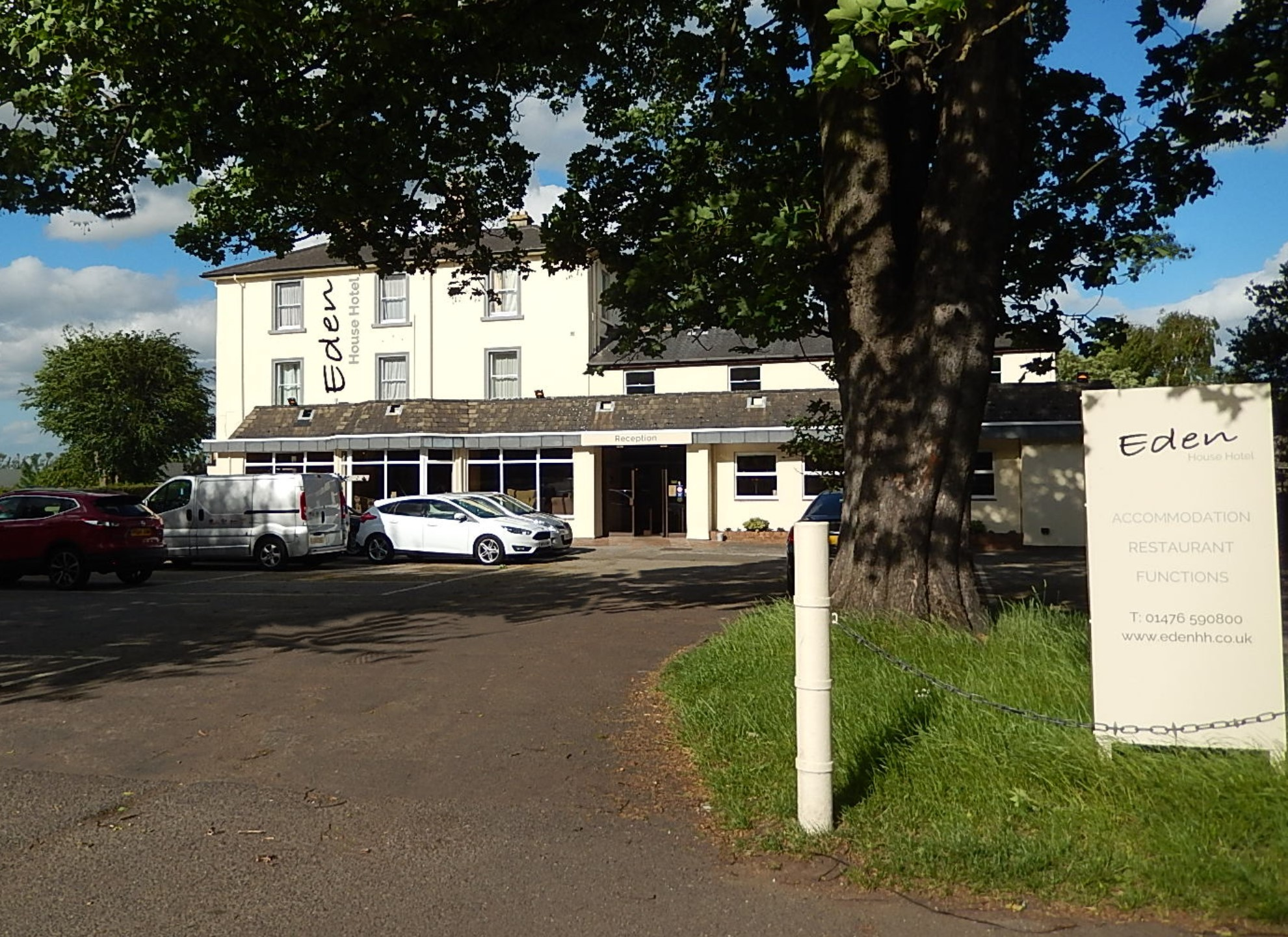
Eden House Hotel

The Eden House Hotel is a building of historical significance in Grantham, Lincolnshire, England. It was built as a mansion in about 1850 and for many years was called Little Gonerby House and after that Diana Lodge. It was the home of several notable people over the next century. Today it is a hotel.

== Early residents ==
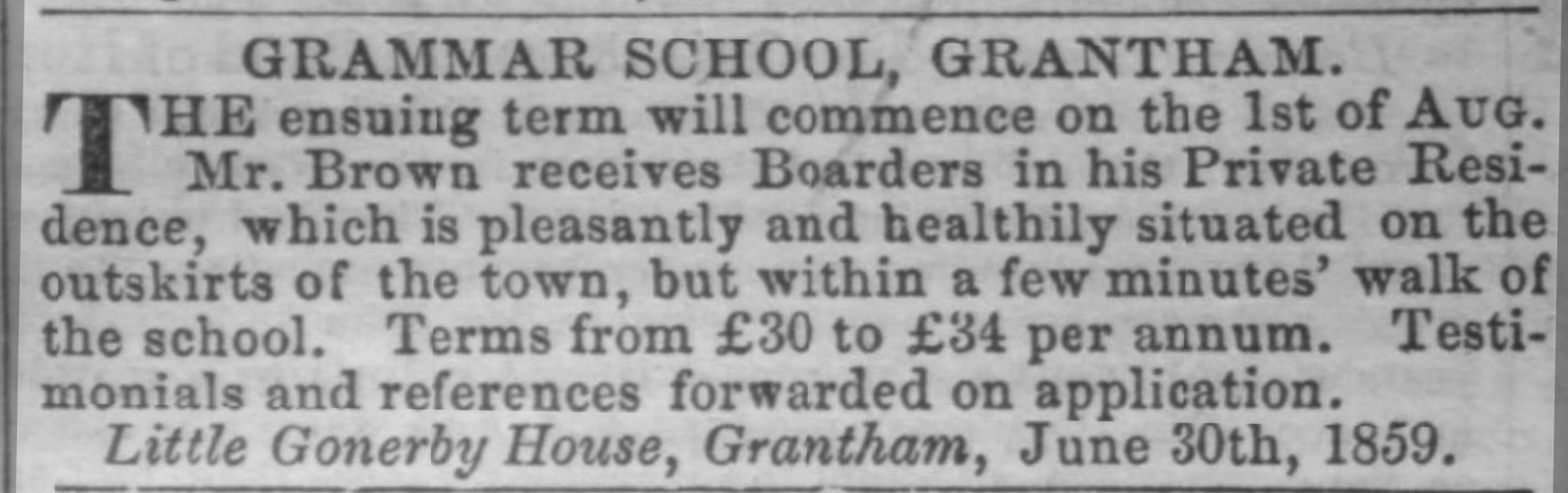
Advertisement in 1859 for boarders in Little Gonerby House (now Eden House Hotel)

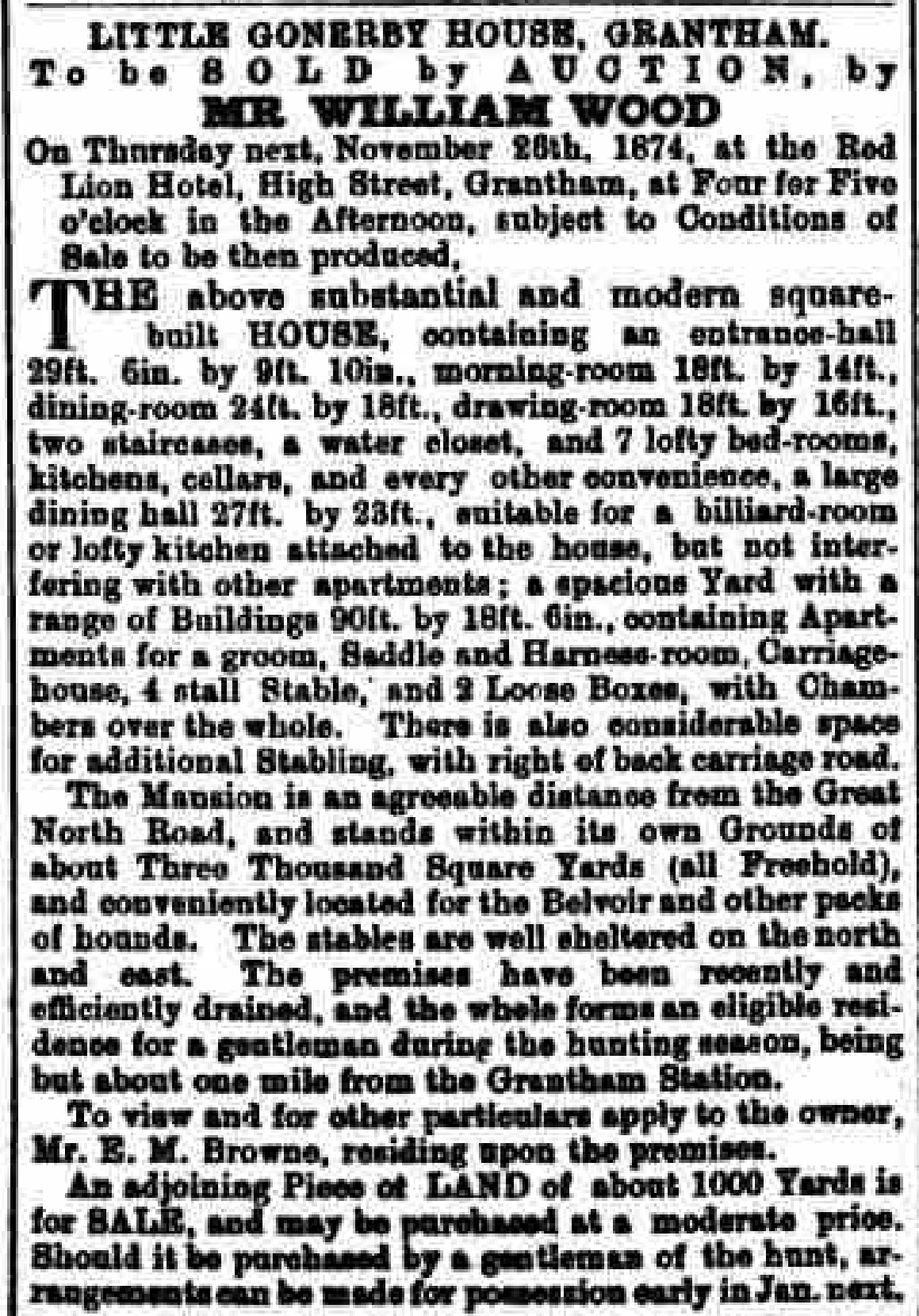
Advertisement for the sale of Little Gonerby House in 1874

The first recorded resident was Edward Montague Browne. He was a teacher at the Grantham Grammar School (now The Kings School). He was born in 1824 in Froxfield in Wiltshire. After working at the Rossell School in Lancashire he came in 1854 to Grantham to teach. He married in 1857 Mary Walkington who was the daughter of the very wealthy banker and landowner William Walkington of Grantham. Shortly after this he moved into Little Gonerby House now Eden House Hotel). As the house was so large he took boarders from the Grammar School in which he was teaching. An advertisement in 1859 for this service is shown. The family received boarders until 1874 when the house was sold. The advertisement describing the property is shown.

The next residents were Madame and Monsieur Couturie who renamed the property Diana Lodge. Henri Joseph Couturie lived in France and came to Grantham with his wife Marie to hunt. In 1865 he inherited a large fortune and the Chateau de Mesnil in Savigné-l'Évêque a very large stud farm which the Couturie family still own today. He was a member of the Belvoir Hunt and is mentioned in a book about their history. It said he is remembered as being a fine horseman who was also known as a gentleman rider on the French turf.

Henri sold the house in 1901. The Hon Maurice Raymond Gifford became the next owner. He was the son of Robert Gifford, 2nd Baron Gifford and became a British Military Officer. He fought in several South African wars and in 1896 lost his right arm when he was hit by a bullet. In 1897 he married Margeurite Thorold (1876-1958) who was the daughter of Cecil Thorold who owned Boothby Hall. She was his sole heir and when her father died in 1895 she inherited the property. The couple lived at both Boothby Hall and Diana Lodge. He died in 1910 and Diana Lodge was sold to Hubert Snowden.

Herbert Guy Snowden was a barrister. He was the son of John Hampden Snowden who was the prebendary of St Paul's Cathedral. In 1897 he married Florence Mary Hankey who was the daughter of Sydney Alers-Hankey of Heathlands House, Wokingham. He died in 1918. The house was sold to Harvey William Warren.

== Later residents ==
Harvey William Warren was a draper. He lived there with his wife Mabel until 1927 when he opened it as a hotel. He called it the Hotel Diana. There was a newspaper article at the time of its opening which described the newly refurbished house. It said:

"The whole place has been renovated and decorated. There a twenty double bedrooms, all of large dimensions being airy and well-lighted. Internally everything has been done to meet modern requirements and accommodation can be provided for at least fifty persons. Special attention has been devoted the residents' dining-room, which will accommodate thirty persons, while another room, with one bay window overlooking the sports field and another facing the road, has been set aside as the commercial room. At the rear of the premises there are at present the dormitories, which Mr. Warren intends converting into a billiard room. with two full-sized tables, while in the yard itself he hopes to make such improvements as to provide garage accommodation for a large number of cars. The lawns and shrubbery in the front of the building are to remain almost they are except that perhaps tennis court will be made. The hotel is ideal from every aspect."

Today the property is a hotel.
