= Idan Ofer =

Israeli business magnate and philanthropist

- עידן עופר
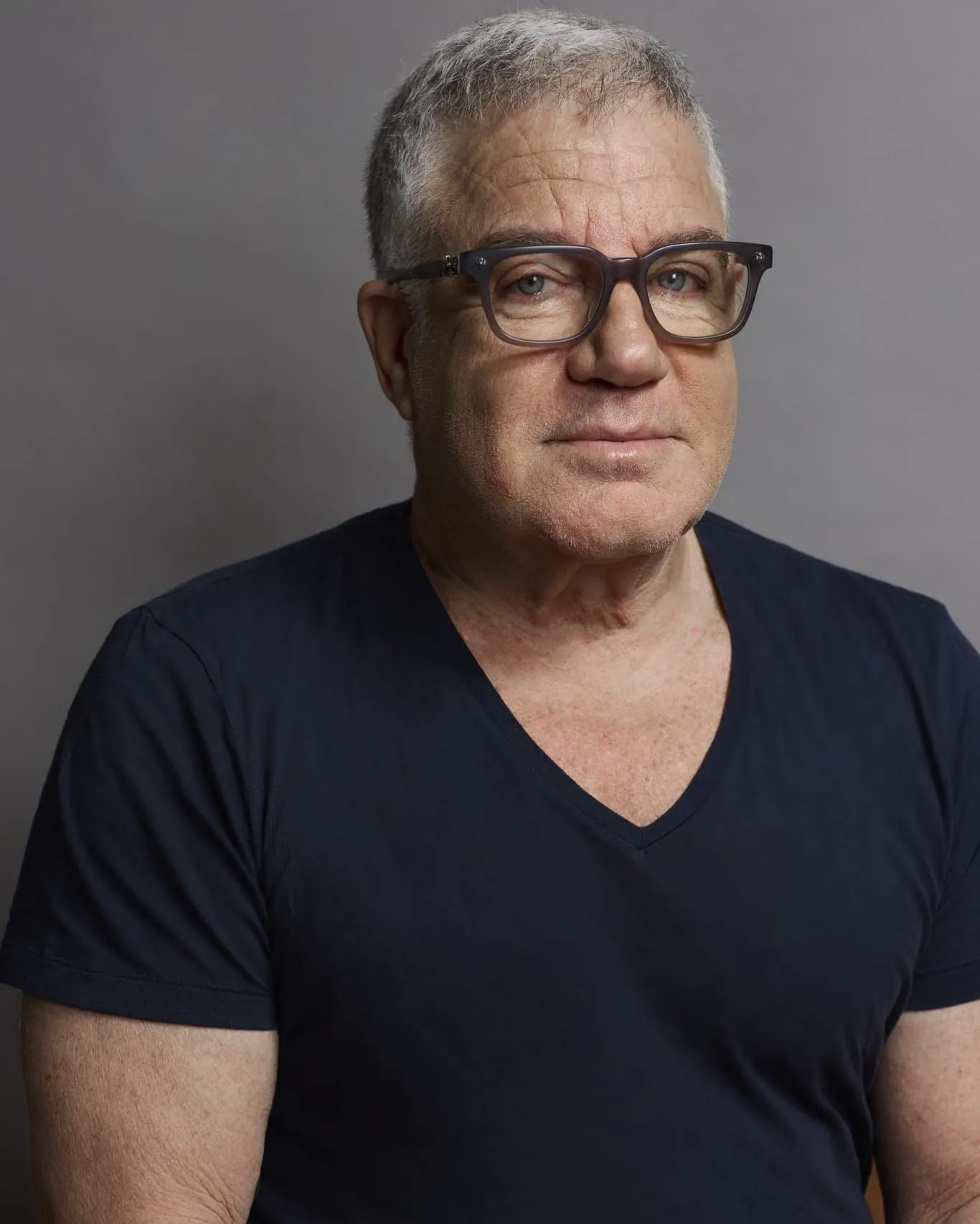
- Born: 2 October 1955 (age 70); Haifa, Israel
- Education: University of Haifa; London Business School
- Occupation: Businessman
- Known for: Shareholder of Quantum Pacific Group, Israel Corporation, Kenon Holdings, Atlético Madrid & Famalicão
- Spouse: Batia Ofer(m ,2009)
- Children: 6
- Parent(s): Sammy Ofer; Aviva Ofer
- Relatives: Yuli Ofer (uncle); Eyal Ofer (brother)
- Net Worth: US$31,100,000,000

Idan Ofer (Hebrew: עידן עופר; born 2 October 1955) is an Israeli billionaire businessman and philanthropist, with interests in shipping, energy, mining and sports. He is the founder and the principal of the Quantum Pacific Group, a holding company. He is majority shareholder of the Israel Corporation, listed on the Tel Aviv Stock Exchange, as well as Kenon Holdings, listed on the Tel Aviv and New York Stock Exchange. He is also the owner of the Israeli holding company Lynav Holdings and the Dutch-based Ansonia Holdings.

Ofer owns a 33% stake in Spain's La Liga association football club Atlético Madrid, and an 85% stake in Portugal's Primeira Liga association football club Famalicão.

== Early life ==
Idan Ofer is the son of the Israeli billionaire Sammy Ofer (originally Shmuel Herskovich) and Aviva Ofer. His father was an Israeli shipping magnate who immigrated to Israel from Romania. His older brother is Israeli businessman Eyal Ofer. His uncle is Yuli Ofer.

Ofer grew up in Haifa, Israel, to a family of Ashkenazi Jewish (Romanian-Jewish) descent. He was enlisted as to mandatory military service in the Israeli Navy, serving as deputy commander of a patrol boat. He graduated from the University of Haifa, Israel, with a Bachelor of Science in Economics and Shipping. He then received a Master's in Business Administration from the London Business School in the 1980s. He has been married four times. His fourth wife is Batia Ofer, an art collector and charity fundraiser. He has five children. They resided in Arsuf, Israel (near Tel Aviv) until 2013. His daughter Leigh Ofer resides in New York City; his other children reside in London.

== Business career ==
He started his career by expanding the family shipping business in Hong Kong in the 1980s. He then worked in Singapore and the United States.

He is the principal of the Quantum Pacific Group, a Guernsey-based holding corporation, and the Israel Corporation, one of the largest public holding listed on the Tel Aviv Stock Exchange. He served as the Chairman of the Israel Corporation from 1999 to 2010, and as a member of its board of directors from 1999 to 2013. He has served on the Advisory Boards of Synergy Ventures and Aspect Enterprise Solutions. He was an investor in Better Place, an electric car company which went bankrupt in May 2013.

In 2014, he established Kenon Holdings as a spin off from the Israel Ships Corporation. It is a holding company primarily focused on growth-orientated businesses in the automotive and energy industries. It inherited some of the investments previously held by the Israel Corporation, such as Qoros, a joint project created in partnership with Chery Automobile that manufactures automobiles aimed towards a 'young, internationally minded' market in China. Other investments include Zim Integrated Shipping Services and IC Power. It also includes Inkia Energy, a Peruvian energy company and subsidiary of the IC Power.

He served on the advisory board of the Council on Foreign Relations and the Dean's Council of the John F. Kennedy School of Government at Harvard University. With Richard Branson and others, he is a co-founder of the Carbon War Room, a think tank on climate change based in Washington, D.C. According to The Financial Times, he is "a Tel Aviv liberal in the mould of the old Israeli Labour party."

After his father's death in 2011, he inherited half his father's fortune and collection of modern art. As a result, by 2013, he was the richest man in Israel.

In March 2022, Israel Corp controlled by Idan Ofer sold 20.17 million shares at $10.90 per share for an overall $220 million.

By February 2023, the Israel Corporation sold all its shares in Oil Refineries to David Federmann, as part of the company's efforts to reduce its carbon footprint. Meanwhile, the Israel Corporation retains investments in Israel Chemicals.

In October 2023, Idan Ofer resigned from Dean's executive board of Harvard Kennedy School, in response to the university's leader response to Hamas’ terror attacks on Israel. Idan Ofer and his wife Batia told in their statement that their “faith in the University’s leadership has been broken” and that they “cannot in good faith continue to support Harvard and its committees".

== Sports ==
In 2018, Ofer purchased a 51% stake via Quantum Pacific Group in Portuguese second league football club Famalicão, which he subsequently increased to 85% in 2019. In 2019, Famalicão was promoted to the top-tier football league in Portugal, the Primeira Liga.

Ofer also owns a 33% stake in Spain's La Liga football club Atlético Madrid.

Since April 2026, Quantum Pacific Group has also owned Spanish SailGP team Los Gallos.

In April 2025, Ofer expanded his sports portfolio into professional cycling by acquiring a 43% stake in Abarca Sports, the parent company of the Spanish Movistar Team, through his Quantum Pacific Management firm.

== Philanthropy ==
Ofer and his wife, Batia Ofer, manage their charitable activities through the Idan & Batia Ofer Family Foundation.

=== Shared Society ===
- Harvard Kennedy School: The foundation established the Sammy Ofer Graduate Fellowship Fund, providing full scholarships for Israeli Jewish, Arab, and Palestinian students.
- Salman Habaka Leadership Program: Launched in 2024, this program provides academic scholarships and leadership training for members of the Arab community, with a focus on female empowerment.
- Peres Center for Peace and Innovation:The foundation funds the "New Generation" program, which trains Jewish and Arab youth from peripheral regions in social entrepreneurship.
- Bezalel Academy of Arts and Design: Funding was provided for the Art Wing and the International Hub at the academy's Jerusalem campus to facilitate cross-cultural research and dialogue.

=== Education, Culture, and Arts ===
- Royal Academy of Arts: In 2023, the couple launched the "25 & Under" scheme, subsidizing half-price exhibition tickets for visitors aged 16–25 to improve accessibility for young people. They also support the academy's policy of free entrance for visitors under the age of 16 and sponsor the Young Friends Membership program.
- London Business School: In 2013, Ofer donated £25 million ($42 million) to establish the Sammy Ofer Centre, the largest single gift in the school's history.
- National Library of Israel: In 2021, the foundation donated $15 million to fund a 1.5-dunam public park and amphitheater at the library's Jerusalem headquarters. These spaces are open to the public with free entrance.
- Singapore Maritime Scholarship: In 2021, Ofer launched a scholarship program in Singapore awarding up to ten full-term scholarships annually to students entering the maritime industry.
- Jewish Museum London: In 2017, the couple made charitable contributions to support the museum's operations.

=== Healthcare and Emergency Relief ===
- Medical Infrastructure: Funding has been provided for the Sammy Ofer Heart Building at Ichilov Hospital (Tel Aviv Medical Center) and the underground emergency facility at Rambam Medical Center in Haifa.
- Community Rehabilitation: In 2022, Ofer financed the evacuation and housing of 600 Ukrainian families to Bulgaria.

== Controversies ==
Ofer was criticized in Israel for pollution from his chemical factories, and for his lavish lifestyle.

In 2014, an Israeli TV show raised questions about the possible engagement of services from an intelligence firm in one of Ofer's companies. However, the show could not conclusively prove these claims.

In 2023, the Ministry of Environmental Protection published its 2021 report on organizations considered as high risk. After Ofer sold his Oil Refineries shares, he is now associated with one company featured on the list.

== See also ==
- List of Jews in sports (non-players)
- List of Israelis
- Ashkenazi Jews
