= R58 =

R58 may refer to:

- R58 (South Africa), a road
- Mini Coupé, a car
- R58: May cause long-term adverse effects in the environment, a risk phrase
