= Gert Hildebrand =

German car designer

- Born: Gert Volker Hildebramd; August 22, 1953 (age 72); Lörrach, Germany
- Occupation: Car designer
- Children: 2

Gert Volker Hildebrand (born 22 August 1953 in Lörrach) is a German car designer and 2011 to 2022 was Head of Design at Qoros.

After studying mechanical engineering at TH Karlsruhe, Hildebrand then studied industrial design at the Braunschweig University of Art from 1975 to 1979, he studied transportation design at Royal College of Art in London in 1980.

== Career ==
Hildebrand began his career with Opel in 1980, where he worked on the 1983 Kadett E. In 1986 he joined Volkswagen as Head of Concept Design, overseeing the development of the Golf III.

In 1989 he joined 3M as a design leader and in 1995 returned to the Volkswagen Group to become Alternate Head of Exterior Design at Volkswagen from 1994 to 1998, and in addition Head of Design at the SEAT Centro Tecnico in Martorell, Spain, from 1995 to 1996.

Hildebrand was appointed Chief Designer at Mitsubishi Design Europe in 1997 where he worked for three years. In 2001 he became General Manager of Mini Design, leading the Mini Countryman, Clubman and Coupé models.

In 2011, Hildebrand joined the new Chinese Israeli joint venture Chery Quantum Automotive Corporation, now called Qoros, as Head of Design.

== Notable designs ==
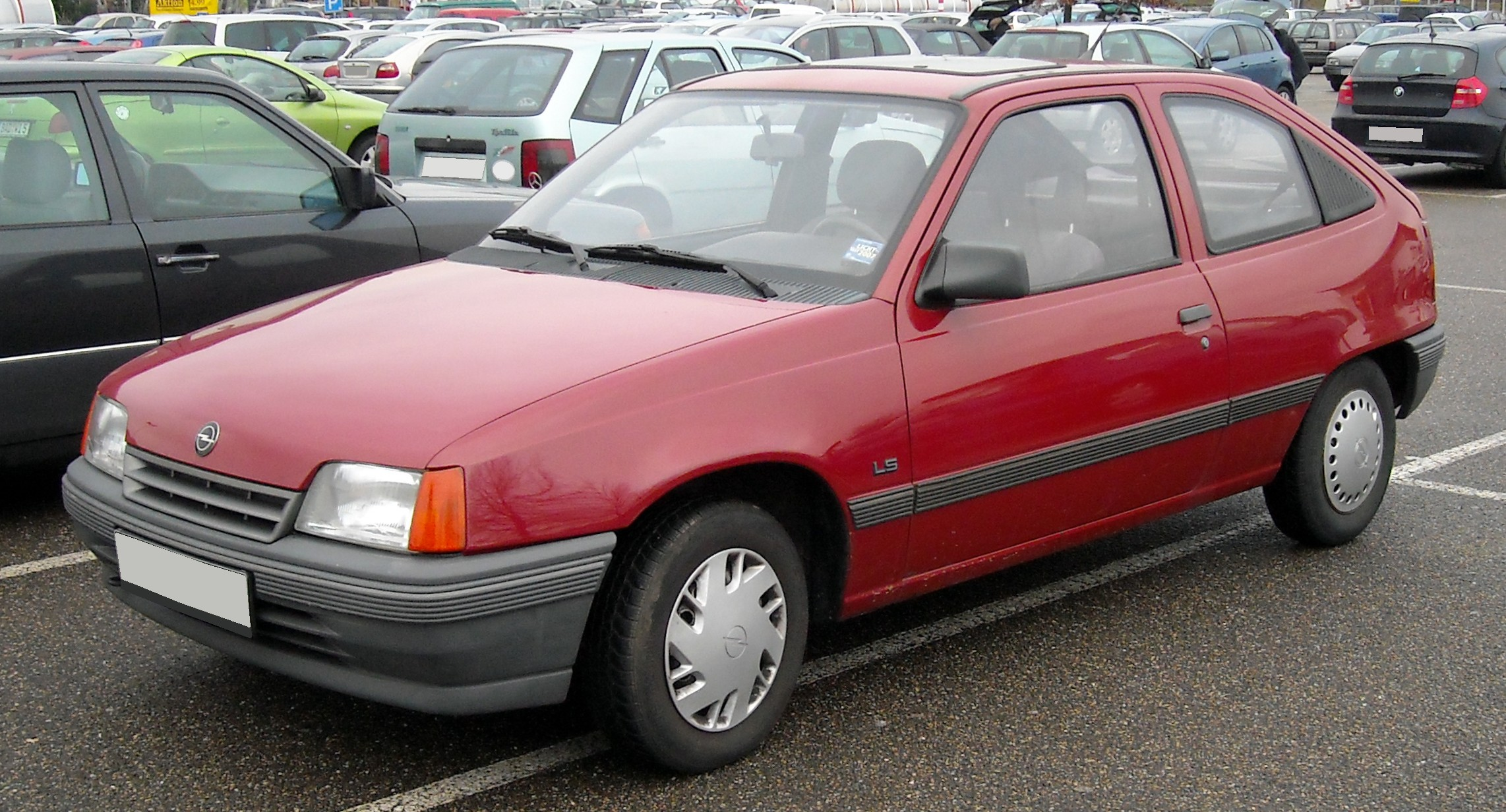
Opel Kadett E

- Opel Kadett E
- Volkswagen Golf Mk3
- SEAT Leon
- Mini Countryman
- Mini Clubman
- Mini Coupé
- Qoros 3
- Qoros 5
