= Qoros 7 =

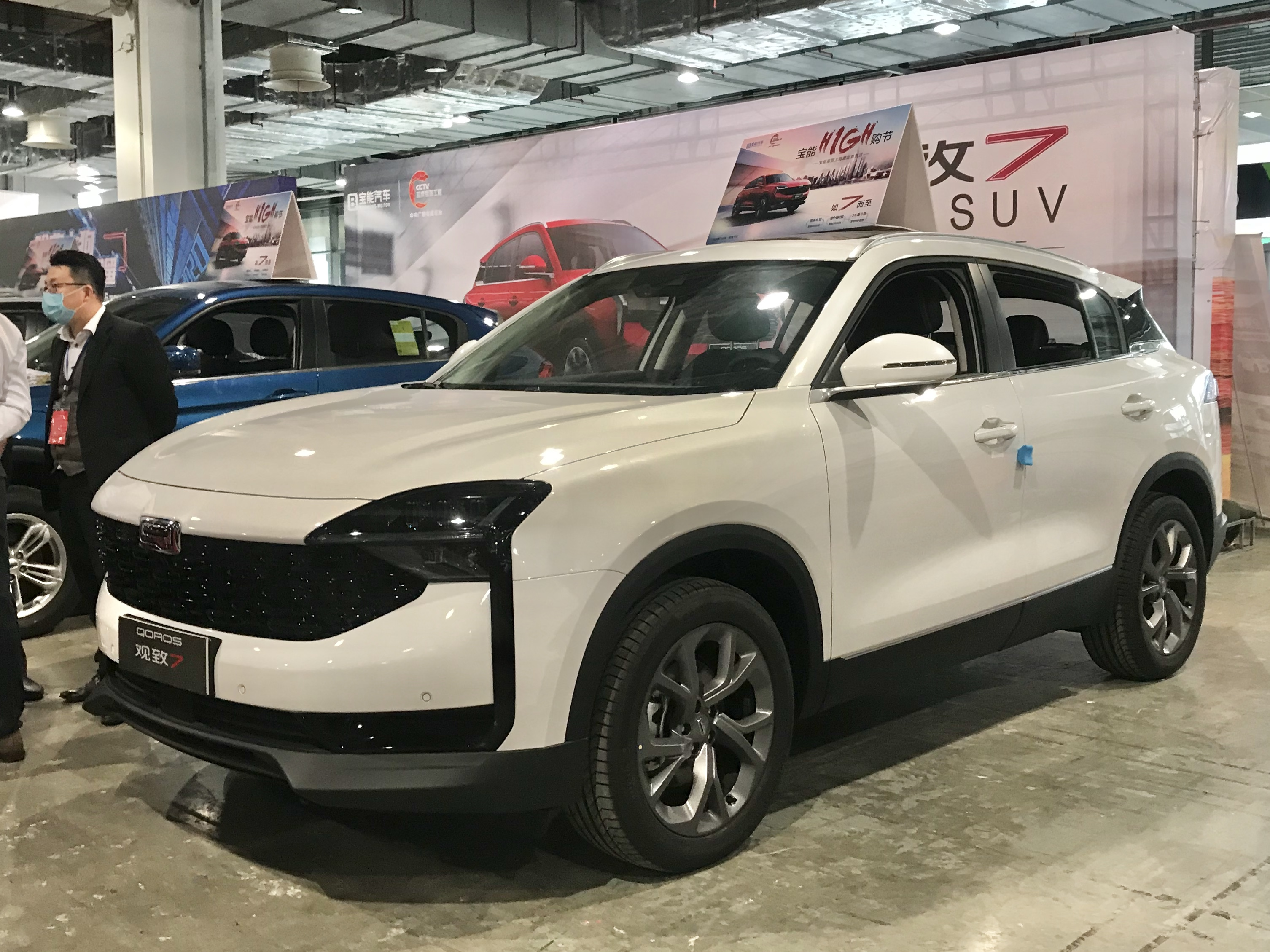
- Qoros 7

Overview
- Manufacturer: Qoros Auto
- Production: 2020–2022
- Assembly: Changshu, China
- Designer: Yang Cai (Head of Design, 2019); Zixuan Zhang

Body and chassis
- Class: Mid-size crossover SUV
- Body style: 5-door SUV
- Layout: Front-engine, front-wheel-drive

Powertrain
- Engine: 1.6 L CE16 I4 (turbo petrol); 1.8 L CE18 I4 (turbo petrol)
- Transmission: 7-speed automatic

Dimensions
- Wheelbase: 2,720 mm (107.1 in)
- Length: 4,679 mm (184.2 in)
- Width: 1,897 mm (74.7 in)
- Height: 1,679 mm (66.1 in)

The Qoros 7 is a mid-size crossover SUV produced by the Chinese automobile manufacturer Qoros.

== Overview ==
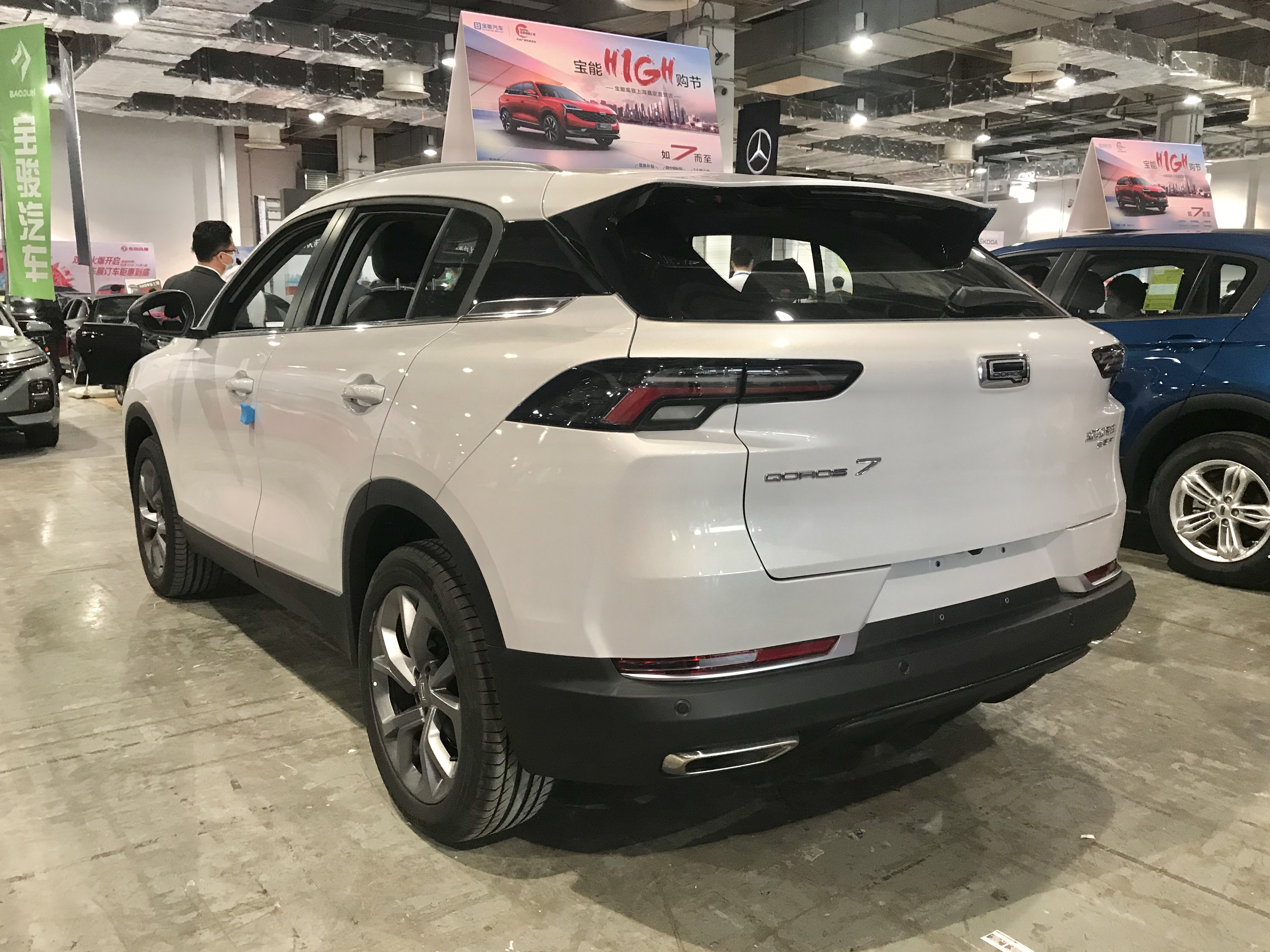
Qoros 7 rear

The Qoros 7 was launched in September 2020 as the first model of Qoros under Baoneng Investment Group's control. The model is also the flagship model of Qoros, as it is the largest model offered by Qoros up to date.

The five-door SUV was launched at the 2020 Beijing Auto Show in November 2020, featuring a front face that inherits the design language of Qoros MILE II concept car revealed during the Shanghai Auto Show in 2019.

== Specification ==
Based on expanded platform from the compact Qoros 5, the Qoros 7 comes with an option of two turbocharged petrol engines, a 1.6-litre inline-4 engine with 150 kW (201 hp; 204 PS) and 280 N⋅m (207 lb⋅ft; 29 kg⋅m) or a 1.8-litre inline-4 engine with 170 kW (228 hp; 231 PS) and 300 N⋅m (221 lb⋅ft; 31 kg⋅m) which adopts Valvetronic continuously variable valve lift technology and turbocharging intercooling direct injection technology. A wet dual-clutch seven-speed automatic gearbox is the only transmission option offered for the Qoros 7. Suspension for the Qoros 7 is MacPherson front struts with a multi-link independent rear setup, and electric power steering is developed by Bosch.
