= Qoros 5 =

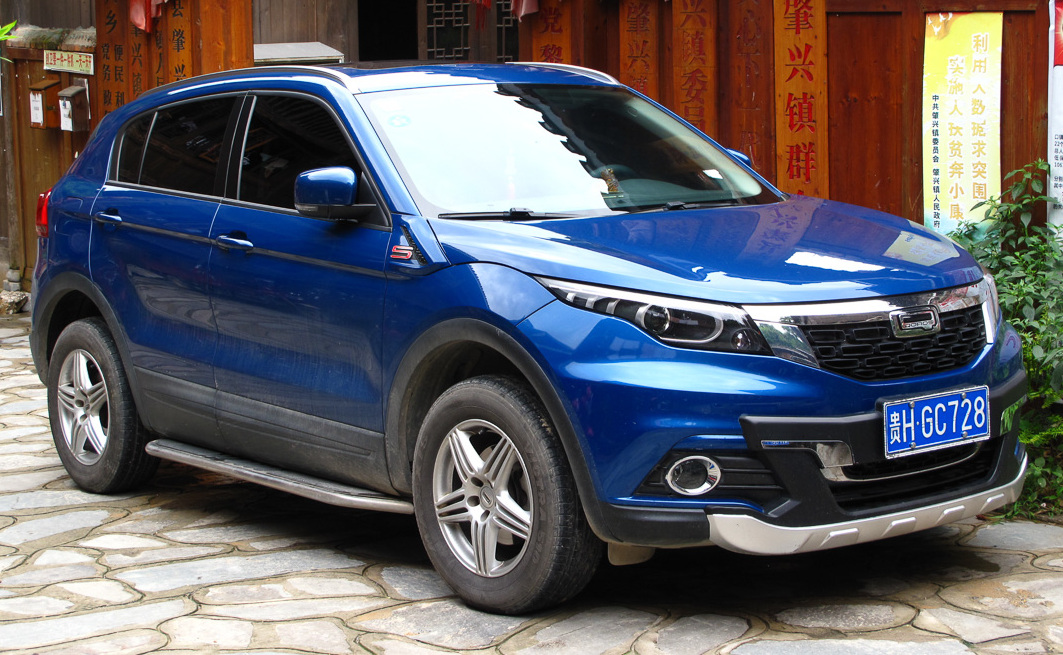

Overview
- Manufacturer: Qoros Auto
- Production: 2016–2020
- Assembly: Changshu, China
- Designer: Gert Hildebrand

Body and chassis
- Class: Compact crossover SUV
- Body style: 5-door SUV
- Layout: Front-engine, front-wheel-drive

Powertrain
- Engine: 1.6 L SQRF4J16 I4 (petrol)
- Transmission: 6-speed manual 6-speed automatic

Dimensions
- Wheelbase: 2,697 mm (106.2 in)
- Length: 4,587 mm (180.6 in)
- Width: 1,869 mm (73.6 in)
- Height: 1,676 mm (66.0 in)
- Kerb weight: 1,540 kg (3,400 lb)

The Qoros 5 is a compact crossover SUV produced by the Chinese automobile manufacturer Qoros.

== Overview ==
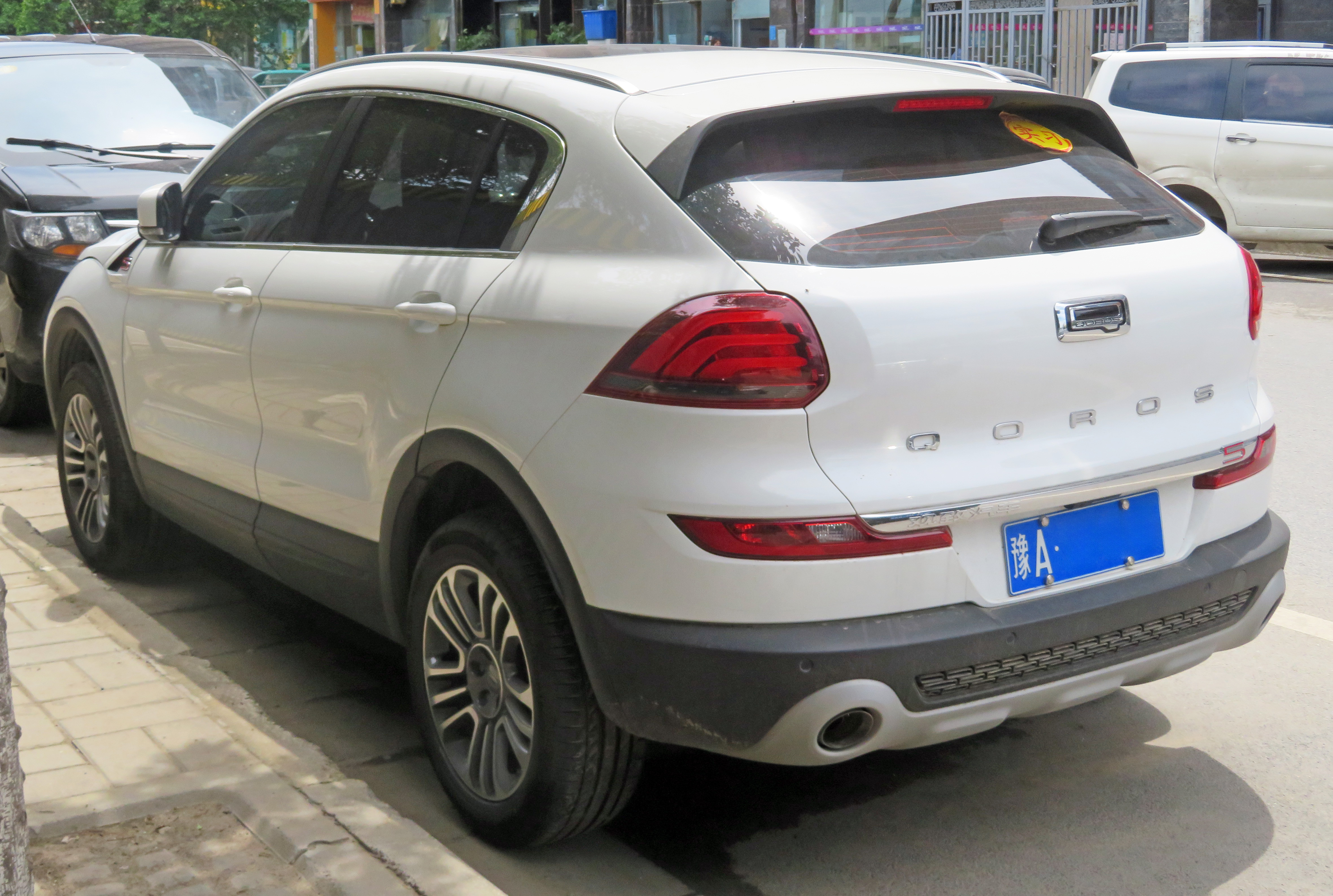
Qoros 5 rear

The Qoros 5 is the second model of automobile from the Chinese manufacturer Qoros Auto, jointly (50%–50%) owned by Kenon Holdings and China's Chery Automobile Company.

The five-door SUV was launched at the Guangzhou Motor Show in November 2015. Sales commenced in China early March 2016.

== Specifications ==
The 5 was launched with a four-cylinder 1.6-litre (1598 cc) turbocharged petrol engine shared with the Qoros 3 producing 156 bhp (116 kW; 158 PS).

== Sales ==
In its first year of sales, the 5 accounted for 45 percent of the company's models sold, with nearly 11,000 sold during 2016.
