= Baoneng Group =

Chinese property and financial services conglomerate

Shenzhen Baoneng Investment Group Co., Ltd.
- Type: Conglomerate
- Industry: Various
- Founded: 1992
- Founder: Yao Zhenhua
- Headquarters: Shenzhen, China
- Key people: Yao Zhenhua (Chairman)

Chinese name
- Simplified Chinese: 深圳市宝能投资集团有限公司
- Traditional Chinese: 深圳市寶能投資集團有限公司
Transcriptions
Standard Mandarin
- Hanyu Pinyin: Shēnzhèn-shì Bǎonéng Tóuzī Jítuán Yǒuxiàn Gōngsī

Baoneng Group
- Simplified Chinese: 宝能集团
- Traditional Chinese: 寶能集團
Transcriptions
Standard Mandarin
- Hanyu Pinyin: Bǎonéng Jítuán
- Website: www.baoneng.com

The Baoneng Group (legal name Baoneng Investment Group Co., Ltd.) is a Chinese property and financial services conglomerate controlled by Chinese billionaire Yao Zhenhua, China's 52nd-wealthiest person as of August 2020.

== History ==
The first predecessor of Baoneng was established in 1992 when Yao Zhenhua, taking advantage of the Shopping Basket Programme, set up a vegetable supplying and selling operation in Shenzhen which became one of the largest Shenzhen providers. In 1997, the operation was incorporated as Shenzhen Xinbaokang Vegetable Industries Co., Ltd., later renamed as Shenzhen Xinbaokang Industrial Development Co., Ltd. before adopting its current name in 2000. In 2003, Baoneng took a majority stake in the state owned enterprise (SOE) Shum Yip Logistics, which led to Baoneng taking control of land and other properties, allowing it to gain an advantage on the expanding Chinese property market. In 2005, the company built Shenzhen Baoneng All City, a mix of residential and commercial facilities which became a success. By 2009 the company launched similar ventures throughout China, achieving a growth of about 30% annually for several years. In 2012, Baoneng Group set up Qian Hai Life Insurance Co., Ltd., entering into the finance business.

=== Failed Vanke takeover ===
In 2015, Baoneng, through its subsidiaries Shenzhen Jushenghua Corporation and Qian Hai Life Insurance, attempted an hostile takeover of public (although de facto state-controlled) rival Vanke. In July 2015, Baoneng acquired an initial 5% of Vanke, raising it to 15.25% by November, surpassing SOE China Resources as the largest shareholder. On 11 December 2015, Baoneng had a 22.45% stake. Vanke chairman Wang Shi openly opposed the takeover, and in that month Vanke temporarily left the stock exchange to block Baoneng's continued stock acquisition, accusing it of obtaining funds through allegedly illicit methods. The CSRC actioned against Baoneng, finally leading to the suspension of its insurance business, while Vanke retook its shares.

The dispute ended in 2017 when Shenzhen Metro Group became the largest shareholder of Vanke. Baoneng Group also became the largest shareholder of Gree Electric Appliances, but was criticized by Dong Mingzhu, who called it a "destroyer of Made in China". Under pressure from all sides, Baoneng gradually withdrew from Gree Electric Appliances at the end of 2016.

In October 2017, Baoneng Group signed a project cooperation framework agreement with the Fuyang District Government of Hangzhou, reaching an intention to settle a new energy vehicle project with an annual output of 300,000 vehicles, marking Baoneng's entry into the automotive industry. In December of the same year, Baoneng Group acquired 51% of the shares of Qoros Auto for 6.63 billion yuan and became its controlling shareholder. In the early days of Baoneng's takeover of Qoros, sales showed an upward trend. In the same month, Baoneng Group's 30 billion new energy vehicle industrial park in Guangzhou started construction. In 2019, Baoneng Group once again acquired 12% of Qoros Auto's shares for 1.56 billion yuan, increasing its shareholding ratio to 63%. However, from 2019 to 2021, Qoros Auto's annual sales fell from 22,700 vehicles to 5,200 vehicles.

In April 2017, Baoneng Department Store Retail Co., Ltd. was established to enter the retail field, and plans to launch three formats: Wanmai convenience stores, "Youbaoli" selected supermarkets, and "Dongshi Xishi" warehouse-style membership stores. In 2020, the community fresh food chain "Baoneng Fresh" was established. As of the end of 2020, there were more than 1,000 stores, with central warehouses in more than 100 cities across the country. On October 31, 2020, it set an industry record of 403 community stores opened on the same day. However, Baoneng Fresh's operation and management problems have also attracted criticism.

=== Operational crisis ===
Baoneng Group encountered a crisis in the first half of 2020. According to Great Wall Assets, in the first half of 2020, Qianhai Ruizhi, a subsidiary of its client Baoneng Automobile, encountered temporary liquidity problems during the implementation of industrial mergers and acquisitions, resulting in a loan of 1.6 billion yuan being overdue. Since then, Great Wall Assets has invested in the acquisition of the non-performing assets, Baoneng's liquidity pressure has been temporarily relieved.

At the beginning of 2021, news of layoffs, wage arrears, suspension of social security payments, and arrears of payments to suppliers began to spread from Baoneng Group, mainly concentrated in the Baoneng Fresh and Baoneng Automobile sectors, which expanded rapidly but failed to make a profit. The outside world believes that there are risks in the operation of Baoneng Group. The problem of wage arrears later spread to other business sectors, and the group's employees were also reduced by 20%. Since 2021, the Luohu District Human Resources Bureau of Shenzhen has issued several penalty decisions to Baoneng Group. The reason is that Baoneng Group failed to pay employees' arrears in a timely and full manner in accordance with the law, and failed to correct the situation after being ordered by the labor and social security department. Earlier in 2019, Yao Zhenhua, chairman of the Baoneng Group, asked the Baoneng Group to "transform itself" and put forward the strategy of "Manufacturing Baoneng, Technology Baoneng, and People's Livelihood Baoneng", but the progress was not smooth. On June 30, 2021, Dagong International adjusted the rating outlook of Jushenghua, an investment holding platform under Baoneng, from "stable" to "included in the credit watch list" in its follow-up rating report on Jushenghua and related bonds. Under the pressure of debt, Baoneng Group has already defaulted on its debts. On August 20, Ju Shenghua, a subsidiary of Baoneng, announced that Baoneng Group had reached a preliminary agreement with investors and Minsheng Trust on the deferred repayment plan. In the future, it will implement debt repayment funds through the disposal of some assets, strategic focus on reducing expenses and other plans. It is expected that all repayments of related wealth management products and trust plans will be completed before the end of 2021. Entering October, the debt situation of Baoneng Group companies further deteriorated. According to the announcement of its subsidiary Zhongju High-Tech, Baoneng Group announced a plan to resolve the liquidity crisis. The first is to accelerate the sale of six projects in Foshan, Guangdong, Shaoxing, Zhejiang, etc., with an estimated return of 4.792 billion yuan in the fourth quarter; in addition, Yao Zhenhua has publicly sold eight assets including Shenzhen Baoneng Center, logistics park assets, Qianhai project, etc., involving land, old town renovation, equity of financial enterprises and commercial complexes. It is expected that within 3 to 4 months, the return of about 20 billion yuan will be completed.

On March 17, 2022, the Guangzhou Intermediate People's Court announced in a notice that it had accepted a case involving a financial loan contract dispute between the Guangzhou Bank Co., Ltd. Development Zone Branch (the plaintiff) and the defendants Yao Zhenhua, Guangzhou Baoshi Logistics Co., Ltd., Baoneng Group, and Jushenghua. The notice stated that Yao Zhenhua's "whereabouts are unknown" and that a copy of the civil complaint, evidence materials, and a response notice were served to Yao Zhenhua. On March 22, Baoneng Group responded that the news was untrue and disclosed that Yao Zhenhua had inspected the Baoneng Automobile Shenzhen factory on March 21; the court's official website also deleted the notice. And Qoros Auto under the Baoneng Group has also seen rights protection. In May 2022, the Shandong Automobile Circulation Association issued a document stating that due to the closure of the Qoros Auto direct store in Jinan, the factory service phone number has been cancelled. The association has included the Baoneng Qoros Auto brand in the consumer blacklist and issued a consumer warning. On May 11, Baoneng responded that its headquarters had moved from Shenzhen Industrial Logistics Building to Shenzhen Baoneng Center, emphasizing that the "empty building" was a misunderstanding. Qoros 4S stores in other places are basically selling off vehicles or shutting down. A large number of dealers have withdrawn, and a few are planning to withdraw from the network. In addition, in April 2022, the government removed the investment registration information of two investment projects established by Baoneng Automobile in Kunming because they had not started construction for two years. At the end of the same year, the Changshu competent authorities also issued a warning to Qoros Auto.

Since 2023, some of Baoneng's assets have been auctioned, including dozens of properties in Shenzhen Baoneng City Garden and some of its shares in Zhongju High-Tech. In April of the same year, Baoneng Automobile continued to suffer from problems such as arrears of rent, payment for goods, deposit for the second network, arrears of wages, social security, and housing provident fund payment, resulting in only 7 directly operated stores in the country (all of which are self-owned properties); at the same time, the announcement of its Qoros 7 by the Ministry of Industry and Information Technology had expired, and a large number of purchased vehicles were detained and could not be registered, causing Baoneng Automobile's overall business to stagnate, with only 126 people in office. The local planning department required the Baoneng Automobile Xi'an base to return the real estate certificate, and later declared it cancelled for not returning it within the prescribed time limit. As of July 18, 2023, the total amount of execution of Baoneng Group exceeded 41.7 billion yuan, Yao Zhenhua was restricted from high consumption. On July 31, Yao Zhenhua was attacked by an employee who was owed wages in the park and was knocked to the ground. Baoneng Group responded that all its colleagues strongly condemned the violent attack, and had taken corresponding legal actions and necessary measures to ensure the personal safety of all cadres and employees and the normal operation of the company. On August 15, Yao Zhenhua's 300 million yuan equity in Baoneng Group was frozen by the court.

== Operations ==
=== Financial services and property business ===
The Baoneng Group comprises about 40 companies in real estate, logistics, microfinance, education, healthcare.

Baoneng has over 40 shopping malls in China.

=== Automotive business ===
In 2017, the Baoneng Group acquired a 63% controlling stake in the automobile maker Qoros. Chery took a 25% and Kenon Holdings the remaining 12%. That same year, the Baoneng Group set up the subsidiary Baoneng Motor to manage its automotive business. Baoneng launched projects to build new energy vehicle plants in Kunshan, Xixian, Kunming, Hangzhou, Xi'an, and Guangzhou.

In January 2020, the Baoneng Group agreed to acquire the assets of Changan PSA from stockholders Changan Auto and Groupe PSA through its wholly owned subsidiary Shenzhen Qianhai Ruizhi Investment. In May 2020, after the transaction was completed, Changan PSA was dissolved and its facilities renamed as Shenzhen Baoneng Motor Co., Ltd. The vice president of the Baoneng Group, Sun Li, became the legal representative of the new company.
