= R59 =

R59 may refer to:

- R59 (London Underground car)
- R59 (South Africa), a road
- HMS Wakeful (R59), a destroyer of the Royal Navy
- Mini Roadster, a car
- R59: Dangerous for the ozone layer, a risk phrase
