= Qoros 3 =

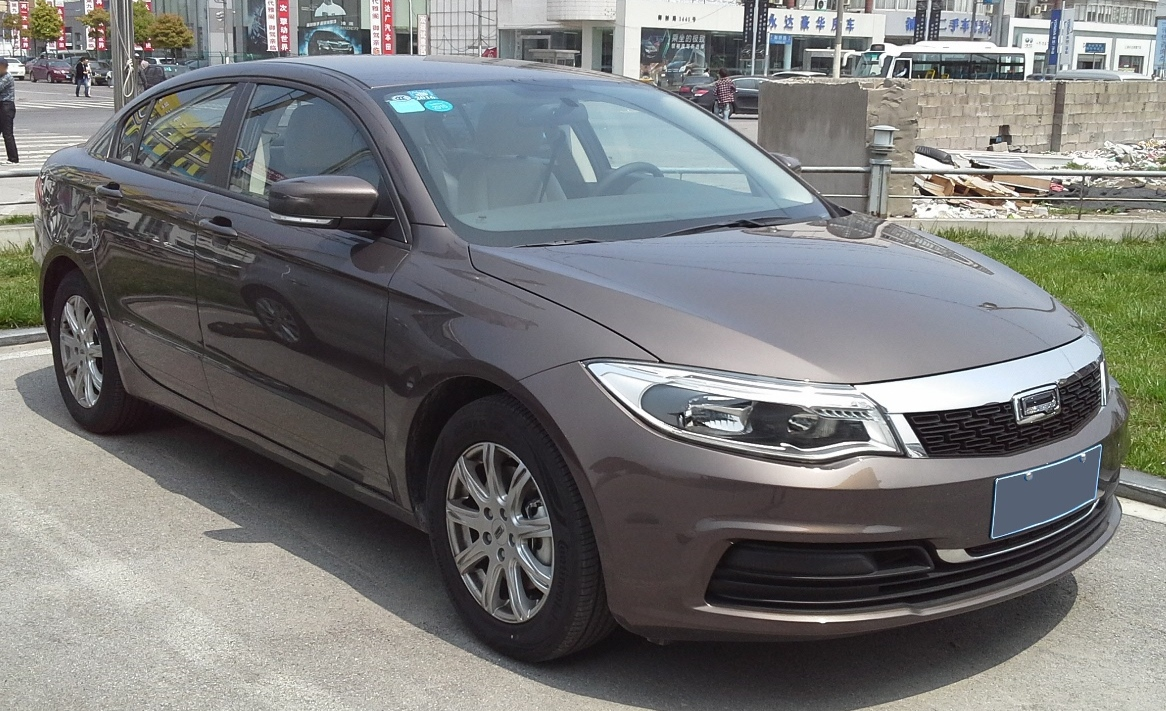

Overview
- Manufacturer: Qoros Auto
- Production: 2013–2020
- Assembly: Changshu, China (Qoros Automotive Co. Ltd.)
- Designer: Gert Hildebrand

Body and chassis
- Class: compact car
- Body style: 4-door sedan 5-door hatchback
- Layout: Front-engine, front-wheel-drive

Powertrain
- Engine: 1.5 L SQRE4T15C I4 (turbo petrol) (2021 model year); 1.6 L SQRE4G16 I4 (petrol); 1.6 L SQRE4T16 I4 (turbo petrol)
- Transmission: 6-speed manual 6-speed QorosTroniq automatic CVT (2021)

Dimensions
- Wheelbase: 2,702 mm (106.4 in)
- Length: 4,615–4,627 mm (181.7–182.2 in) (sedan); 4,438 mm (174.7 in) (hatchback); 4,452 mm (175.3 in) (City SUV)
- Width: 1,839 mm (72.4 in); 1,854 mm (73.0 in) (City SUV)
- Height: 1,445 mm (56.9 in); 1,504 mm (59.2 in) (City SUV)
- Kerb weight: 1,320 kg (2,910 lb) to 1,430 kg (3,150 lb)

The Qoros 3 is the first automobile from the Chinese manufacturer Qoros Auto, jointly (50%–50%) owned by Kenon Holdings and China's Chery Automobile Company. The four-door sedan was formally announced at the Geneva Motor Show in March 2013. The Qoros 3 commenced sales in China and Slovakia in November and December 2013 respectively. Deliveries started in China in January 2014. A hatchback version made its debut at the Geneva Motor Show in March 2014. A third derivative, the 3 City SUV, was launched in November 2014.

The 3 was designed by ex-Mini designer Gert Hildebrand, and was developed for left-hand-drive markets.

== Specification ==
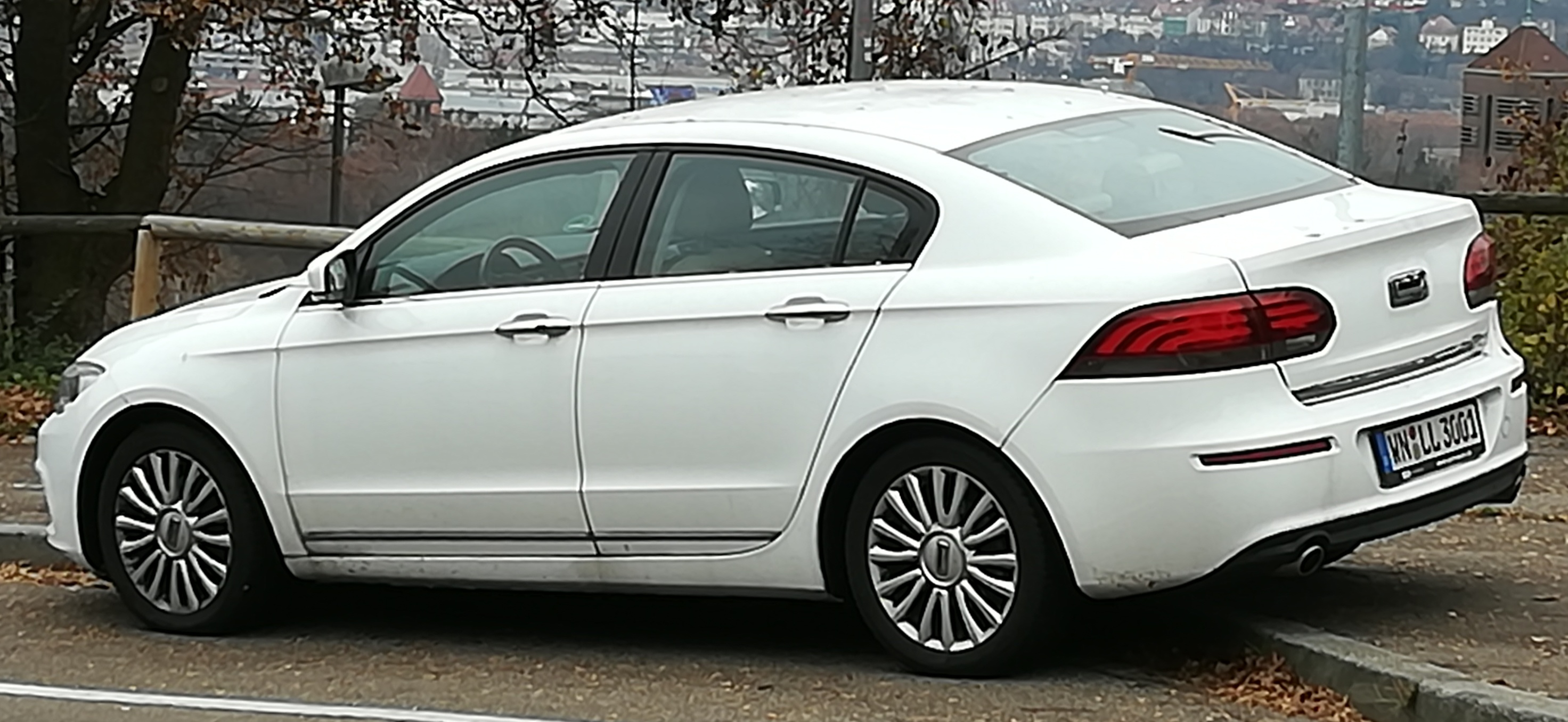
Qoros 3 sedan rear

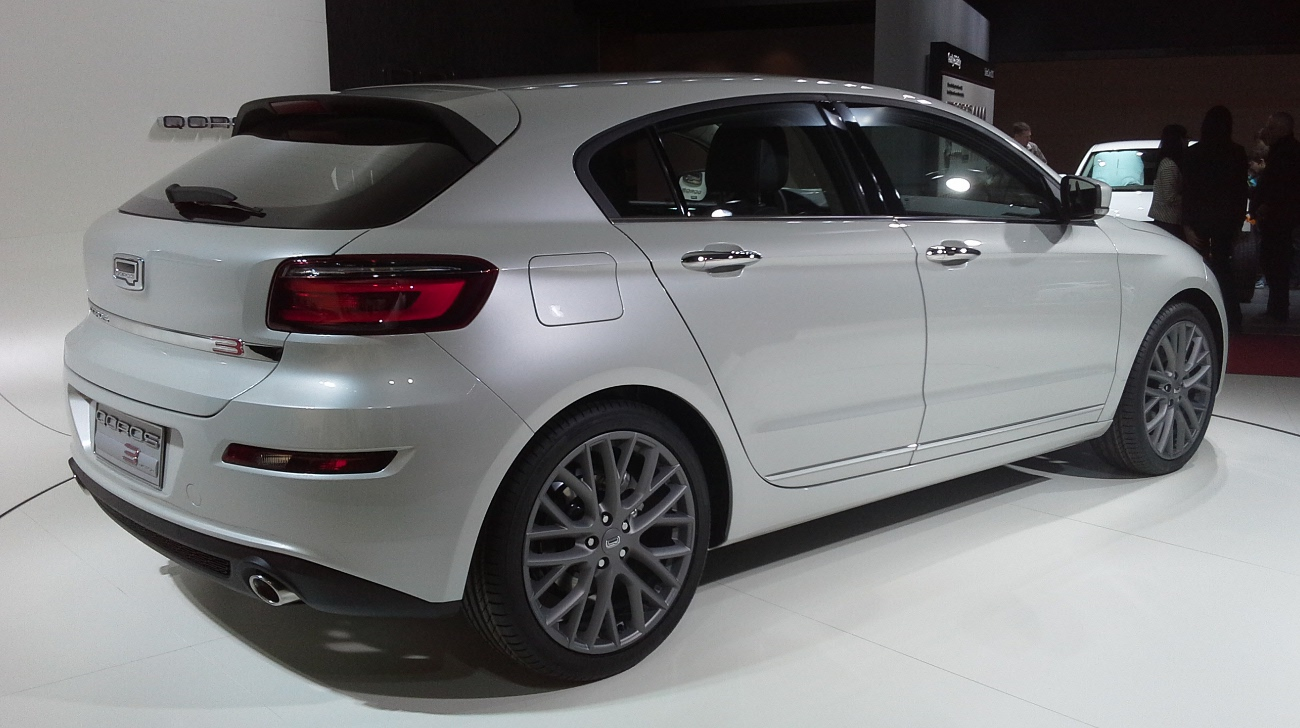
Qoros 3 Hatchback

The 3 is scheduled to be launched with a four-cylinder 1.6-litre (1598 cc) petrol engine in two states of tune; a naturally-aspirated unit producing 126 bhp (94 kW; 128 PS) and 155 N⋅m (114 lb⋅ft) torque, and a turbocharged version with 156 bhp (116 kW; 158 PS) and 210 N⋅m (155 lb⋅ft) torque. Both versions are mated to a six-speed manual transmission as standard, with a six-speed dual clutch transmission optional.

A 1.5 litre turbocharged variant was added in 2021 alongside a CVT transmission option.

Qoros is developing with AVL a three-cylinder 1.2-litre turbocharged engine and a new four-cylinder 1.6-litre turbocharged engine, both featuring direct injection, for future models.

The saloon car is 4,615–4,627 mm (181.7–182.2 in) long, sitting on a 2,702 mm (106.4 in) wheelbase. The hatchback is slightly shorter; 4,438 mm (174.7 in)

== Qoros 3 GT ==
A crossover sedan variant of the Qoros 3 was known as the Qoros 3 GT equipped with the 1.6 litre turbocharged engine featuring plastic cladding crossover cues and a higher ground clearance and ride height.

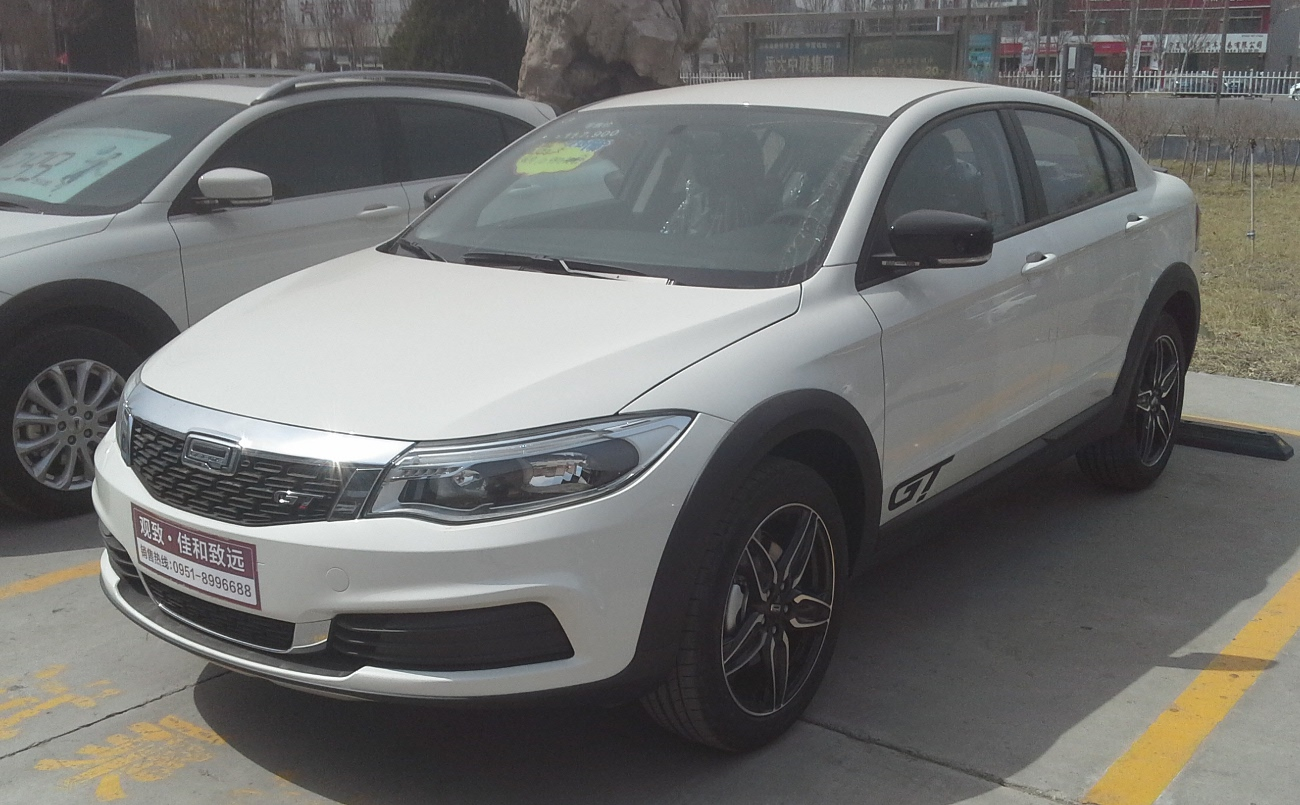
Qoros 3 GT front

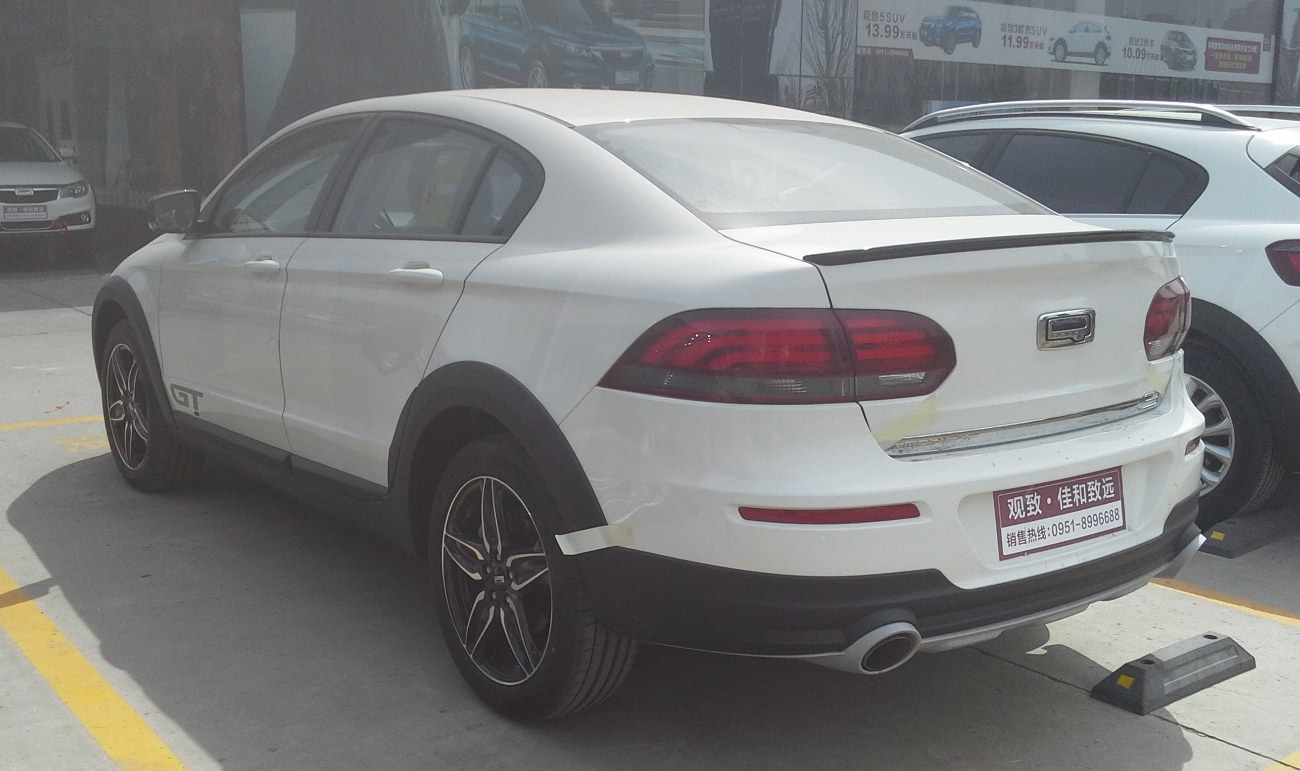
Qoros 3 GT rear

== Qoros 3 City SUV ==
The Qoros 3 City SUV is a compact CUV based on the Qoros 3 hatchback. The Qoros 3 City SUV debuted in November on the 2014 Guangzhou Auto Show. Prices for the City SUV ranges from 139,900 yuan to 179,900 yuan ($22,470 – 28,900).

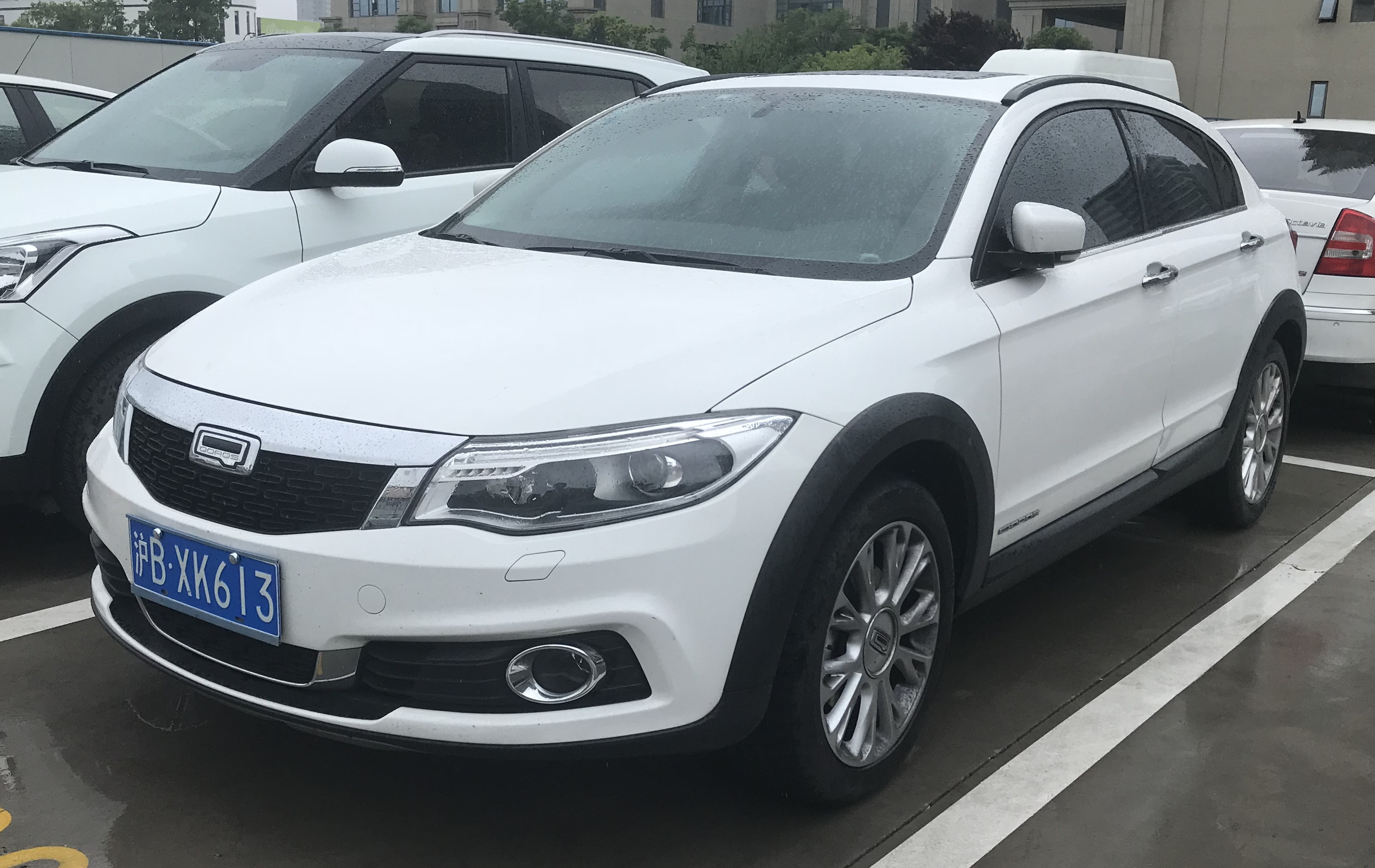
Qoros 3 City SUV front

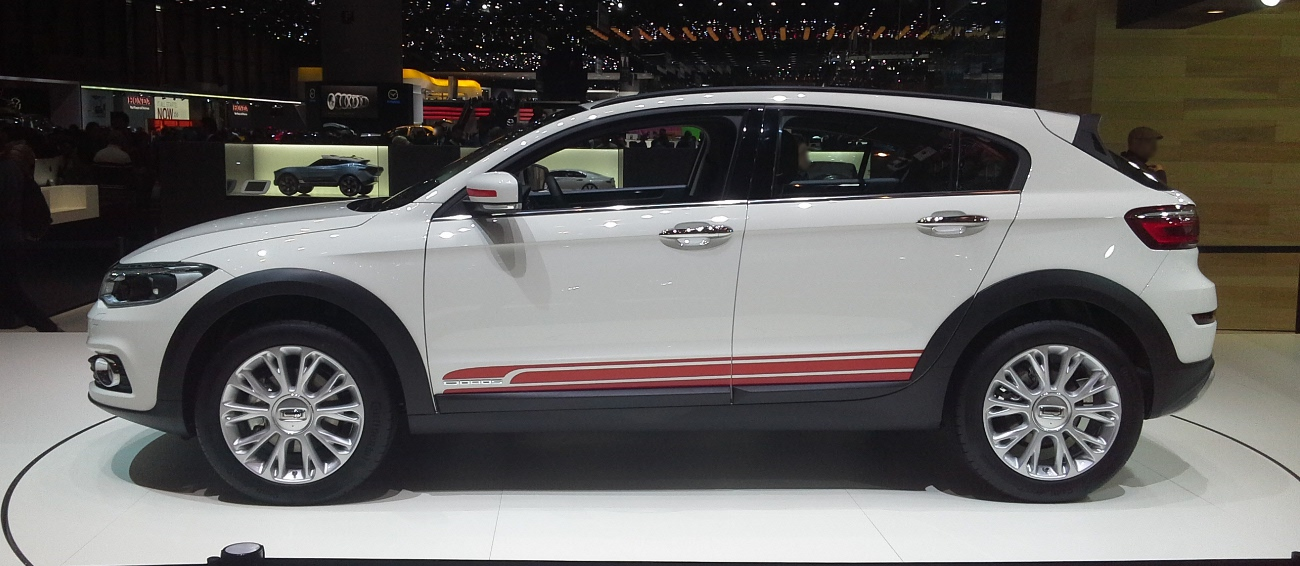
Qoros 3 City SUV side

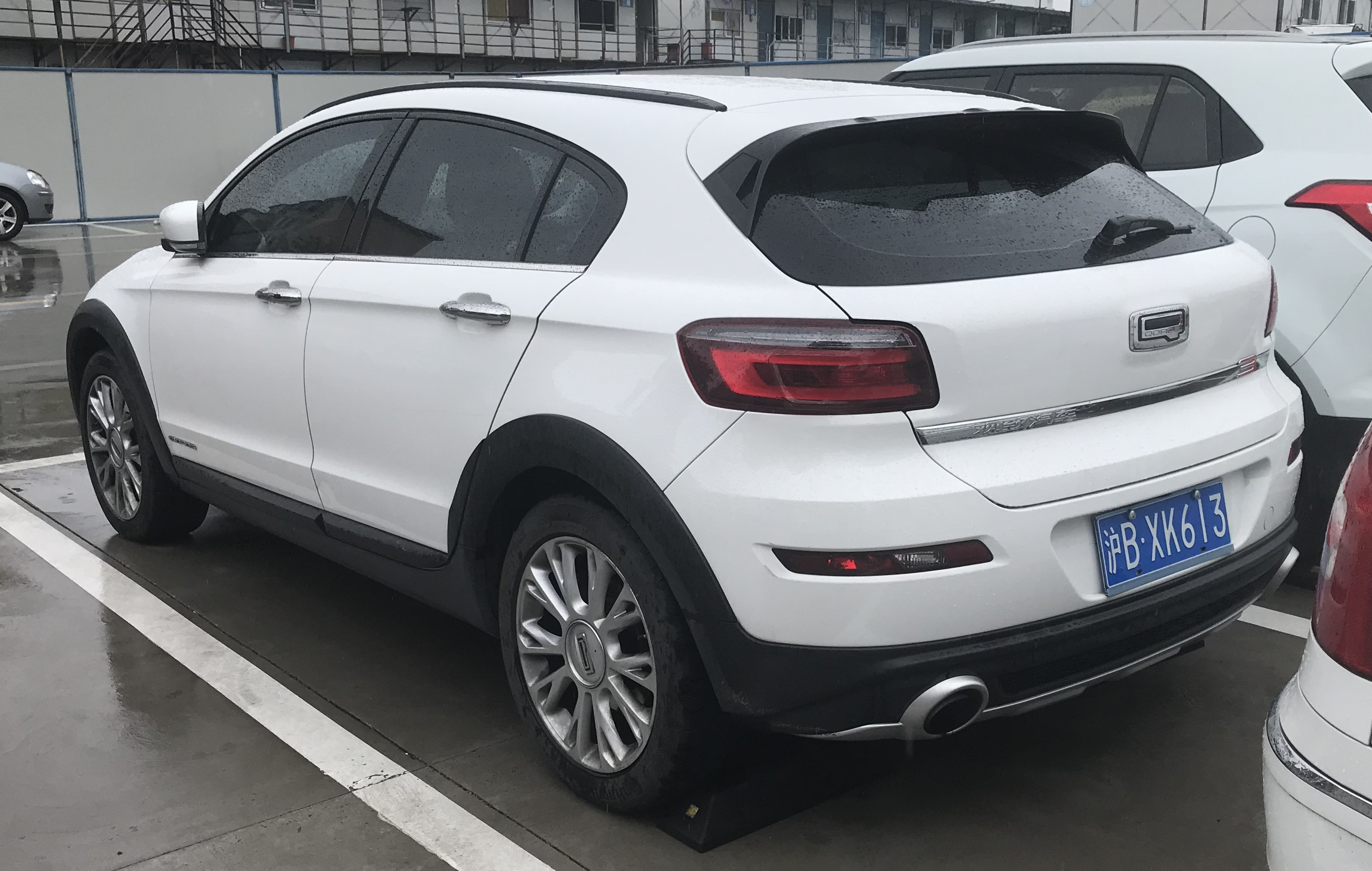
Qoros 3 City SUV rear

== Concept models ==
At the 2013 Geneva Motor Show, Qoros displayed concept models of future derivatives; the Qoros 3 Cross Hybrid Concept and the Qoros 3 Estate Concept.

In 2016 at the Guangzhou auto show, Qoros unveiled a prototype of the 3 with a camless engine, dubbed "Qamfree". The camless engine concept has been developed in partnership with FreeValve, a Koenigsegg subsidiary.

== Safety ==
Euro NCAP test results Qoros 3 Sedan (2013)
Test	Points	%
Overall:	5 /5 stars	
Adult occupant:	34	95%
Child occupant:	43	87%
Pedestrian:	28	77%
Safety assist:	7	81%

In September 2013, the Qoros 3 became the first car originated in China to achieve a five-star rating on the Euro NCAP crash tests. The car scored a 95% on adult occupant protection and an 87% on child occupant protection.

Euro NCAP awarded the Qoros 3 "Small Family Car" Best in Class for 2013, and was recognised as the best of all 33 cars tested in 2013.

== International markets ==
The first foreign sales of the Qoros 3 started in December 2013, with the opening of a dealership in Bratislava, Slovakia.
