= Yao Zhenhua =

Chinese billionaire businessman

- Born: 1969 or 1970 (age 55–56)
- Occupation: Businessman
- Title: Chairman, Baoneng Group

Yao Zhenhua (born 1969/1970) is a Chinese billionaire businessman, and the chairman of Baoneng Group.

== Career ==
In 1992, Yao founded Baoneng Group, which now has over 40 shopping malls in China.

In February 2017, Yao was banned from China's insurance industry for ten years after a failed takeover bid for Vanke by a Baoneng company, Foresea Life Insurance.

== Personal life ==
Yao lives in Shenzhen, China.
