= Qoros =

Chinese automotive manufacturing company

Qoros Auto Co., Ltd.
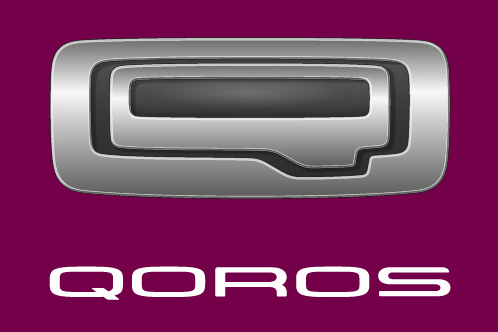
- Type: Joint venture
- Industry: Automotive
- Founded: 2007; 19 years ago
- Defunct: 2026
- Headquarters: Shanghai, China
- Area served: China; Slovakia
- Key people: Kazuo Yajima (President)
- Products: Automobiles
- Owner: Baoneng Group (63%); Chery Automobile (25%); Kenon Holdings (12%)
- Website: www.qoros.com/global/

Qoros
- Simplified Chinese: 观致汽车
- Traditional Chinese: 觀致汽車
- Literal meaning: Qoros Auto Co., Ltd.
Transcriptions
Standard Mandarin
- Hanyu Pinyin: Guānzhì qìchē

Qoros Auto Co., Ltd. was a Chinese automotive manufacturing company headquartered in Shanghai, China. Its principal activity was the design, development, production and sale of passenger cars sold under the Qoros marque.

It was founded as a joint venture between Chery and Israel Corporation in December 2007 under the name Chery Quantum Automotive Corporation (CQAC). The name was changed to Qoros Auto Co., Ltd. in November 2011. In December 2017 Baoneng Group, secured a 51 percent stake in Qoros for 6.6 billion RMB.

The first production model, the Qoros 3, made its first public appearance at the Geneva Motor Show in March 2013 and went on sale in China in November 2013.

In January 2026, Qoros applied for bankruptcy.

== Name ==
Qoros is an invented word. The Q is intended to represent quality, and the whole name to echo the Greek chorus, a collective voice in plays and music, reflecting the multinational nature of the company.

== History ==
It was founded as a joint venture between Chery and Israel Corporation in December 2007 under the name Chery Quantum Automotive Corporation (CQAC); the name was changed to Qoros Auto Co., Ltd. in November 2011. The establishment of the company took place during a peak time in the development of China's automotive industry, following the country's joining the World Trade Organization and amid a phase of rapid growth in vehicle production and sales.

Qoros was established as a 50-50 joint venture between Chery and Kenon's subsidiary Quantum. Kenon later took over Quantum's stake, making the current partners Chery and Kenon Holdings, which controls Israel Corp's investment.

In September 2008, Qoros opened an office in Shanghai.

In October 2009, Qoros signed a cooperation agreement with Magna Steyr.

In June 2010, Qoros relocated its production plant to Changshu Economic & Technological Development Zone following an in-depth appraisal.

In October 2011, construction of the first prototype was completed. A formal unveiling ceremony was held at Changshu, Jiangsu Province, China.

In 2013, Qoros unveiled a sedan atop a brand-new platform at the 2013 Shanghai Auto Show called the Qoros 3. The car marked the brand's entry into the market with modern features and Euro NCAP safety certification.

In 2017, Qoros announced a hiatus to retail Qoros vehicles throughout Europe. However, they are looking into South America as a promising market.

As of early 2018, private Chinese conglomerate Baoneng Investment Group had acquired a 51 percent stake in Qoros, leaving Singaporean investment company Kenon Holdings with a 24 percent stake and Chery with a 25 percent stake. Later in January 2019, Kenon Holdings transferred the 12 percent stake of its 24 percent stake in Qoros to Baoneng Investment Group for RMB 1.56 billion yuan ($230 million). Baoneng owns 63 percent of Qoros, Kenon Holdings owns 12 percent of Qoros, and Chery Automobile continues to own 25 percent after the deal.

By September 2020, Qoros 7, the first model of Qoros under Baoneng Investment Group's control was launched. The model was also the flagship model of Qoros.

In January 2021, Baoneng Group took over 63% of the shares in Qoros, leaving Chery with 25% and Kenon Holdings with just 12%. As the parent company Baoneng Group began to report financial problems in 2021, Qoros Automobile was also announced by the Anhui Province Wuhu Economic and Technological Development Zone People's Court to auction production line equipment at the end of 2022, and was found to have Many vehicles in various provinces and cities have been seized and even listed as dishonest executors. At the same time, netizens have also noticed that its car sharing brand "Linked Cloud" has begun to take back its strongholds, and they suspect that Qoros Group is in financial crisis.

In March 2022, it was dissolved due to declining vehicle sales and the rapid growth of quality of other brands, which made it uncompetitive. Although the company was dissolved, the site still exists and supports after-sales service of vehicles.

In May 2022, the Shandong Automobile Circulation Association issued a statement saying that due to the closure of the Qoros direct-sale store in Jinan and the cancellation of the factory service phone number, the association included the Baoneng Qoros Auto brand in the consumer blacklist and issued a consumer warning. On May 11, Baoneng responded that its headquarters had moved from Shenzhen Industrial Logistics Building to Shenzhen Baoneng Center.

In January 2026, the Suzhou Municipal Court in Jiangsu Province announced that the bankruptcy application of Qoros had been accepted. With over 35 billion yuan (RMB) worth of frozen shares involved, the company has entered bankruptcy proceedings.

=== Sales ===
==== 2014 ====
Sales in China commenced in December 2013, and by the first four months of 2014 the company had sold 1,490 Qoros 3 cars. The sedan is to be joined by a hatchback version in July 2014. By August 2014, Qoros had sold 2,540 cars. Qoros is not expected to make a profit in the early years, "as is usual for beginning companies."

The total sales for 2014, the company's first year of operation, was under 7,000 cars, far below its planned capacity for 150,000 cars. This led to a change in senior management, including the chairman Guo Qian replaced by Chery deputy president and Jaguar Land Rover board chairman Chen Anning. In February 2015, the company announced a new CEO, former General Motors' executive Phil Murtaugh. Murtaugh left the company after less than a year.

==== 2015 ====
In 2015, Qoros sold 14,000 cars.

==== 2016 ====
In 2016, sales of Qoros cars increased by 70 percent, totalling 24,188 for the year.

The company had planned to sell models in Europe, and piloted sales in Slovakia, but in April 2017 it formally announced that it had no plans to sell cars in Europe for the foreseeable future.

== Leadership ==
- Guo Qian (2007–2014)
- Chen Anning (2014–2015)
- Phil Murtaugh (2015–2016)
- Li Feng (2016–2019)
- Kazuo Yajima (2019–2022)

== Models ==
=== Qoros 3 ===
In December 2011, the company released an image of its first prototype, which made its first public appearance at the Geneva Motor Show in March 2013 with the Qoros 3 sedan pre-production model, together with the Qoros 3 Estate Concept and Qoros 3 Cross Hybrid Concept.

In September 2013, the Qoros 3 achieved a five-star rating in the Euro NCAP crash tests, making it the first ever Chinese car to achieve such a rating. It also received the highest score for safety of any car reviewed by Euro NCAP during 2013.

In November 2015, the Qoros 5 was launched at the Guangzhou motor show in China, with sales commencing in March 2016.

=== Qoros 5 ===
The Qoros 5 is the second model of automobile from the Chinese manufacturer Qoros Auto, jointly (50%–50%) owned by Kenon Holdings and China's Chery Automobile Company at the time.

The five-door CUV was launched at the Guangzhou Motor Show in November 2015. Sales commenced in China early March 2016.

=== Qoros Young ===
The Qoros Young is a compact crossover from the Chinese manufacturer Qoros Auto, after the holdings of Qoros was jointly (50%–50%) owned by Kenon Holdings and China's Chery Automobile Company, the Qoros Young was revealed as a rebadged version of the Chery Tiggo 7.

=== Qoros 7 ===
The Qoros 7 is the third original model of automobile from the Chinese manufacturer Qoros Auto, under the control of Baoneng Investment Group at the time.

=== Product Gallery ===
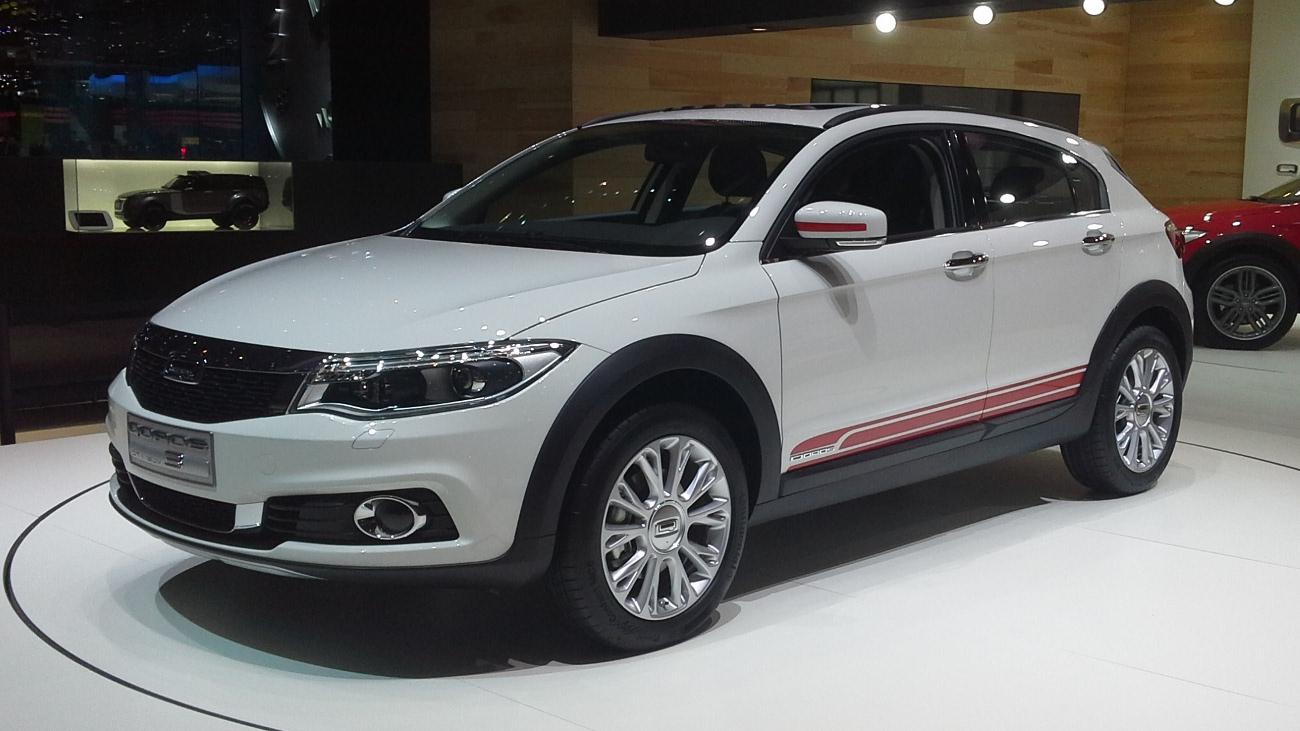
Qoros 3 City SUV

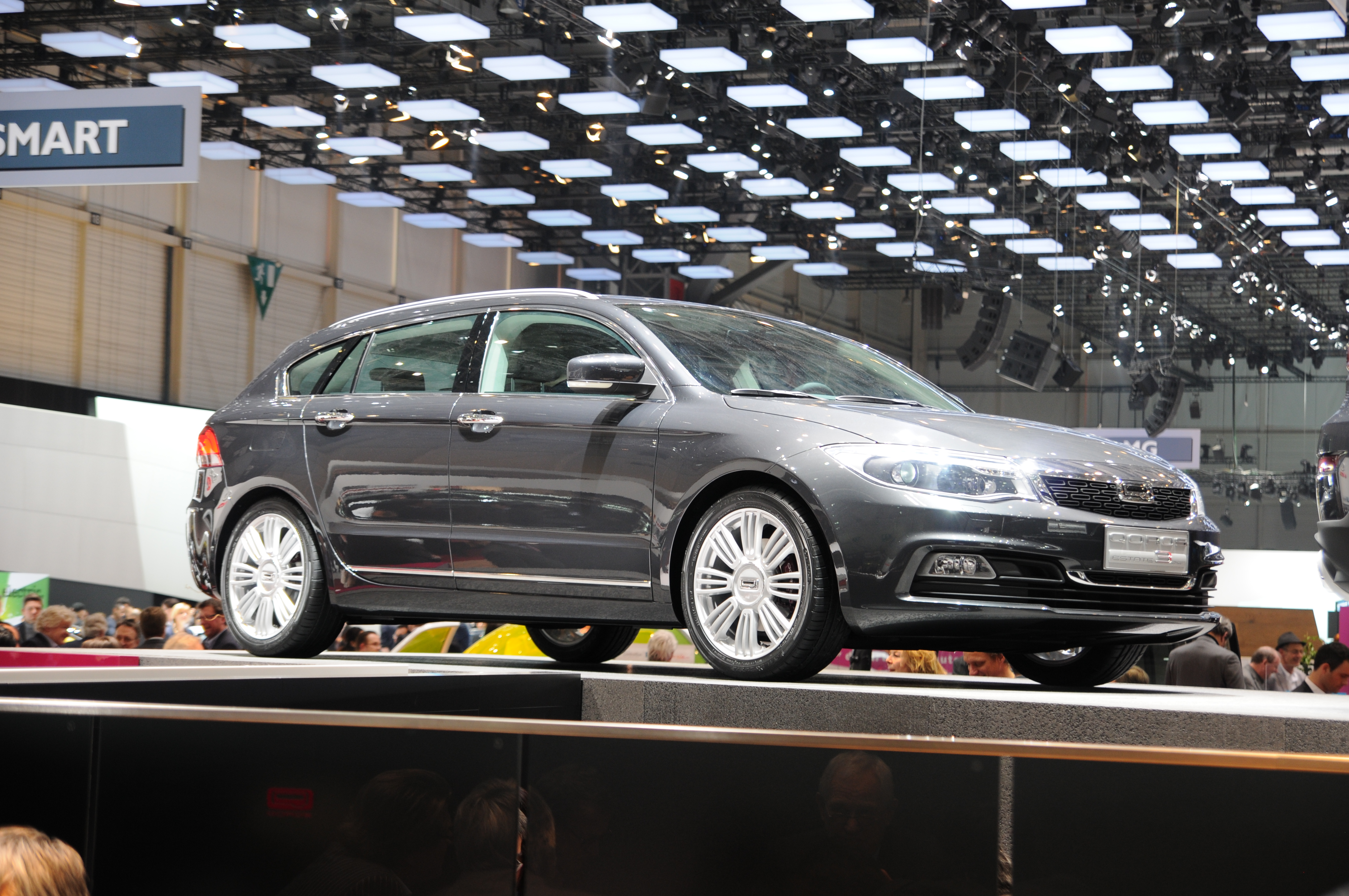
Qoros 3 Estate

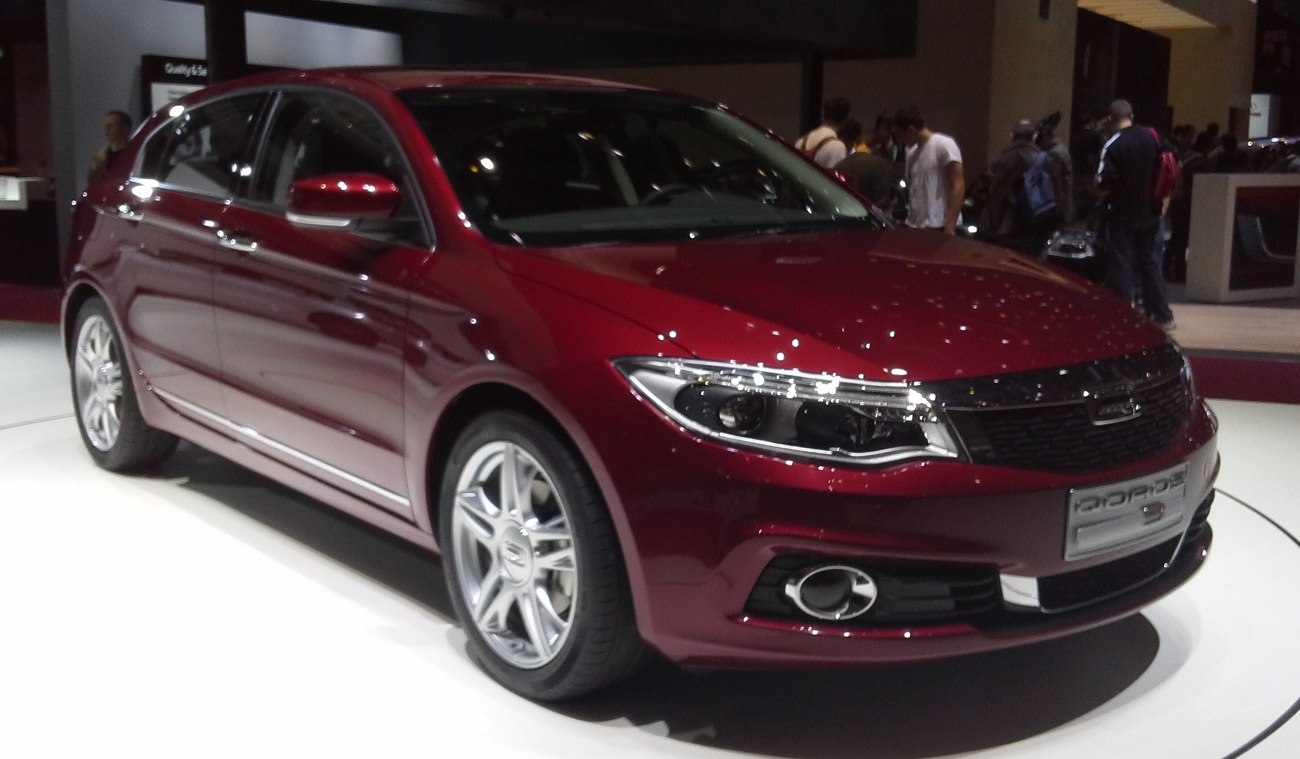
Qoros 3 Hatchback

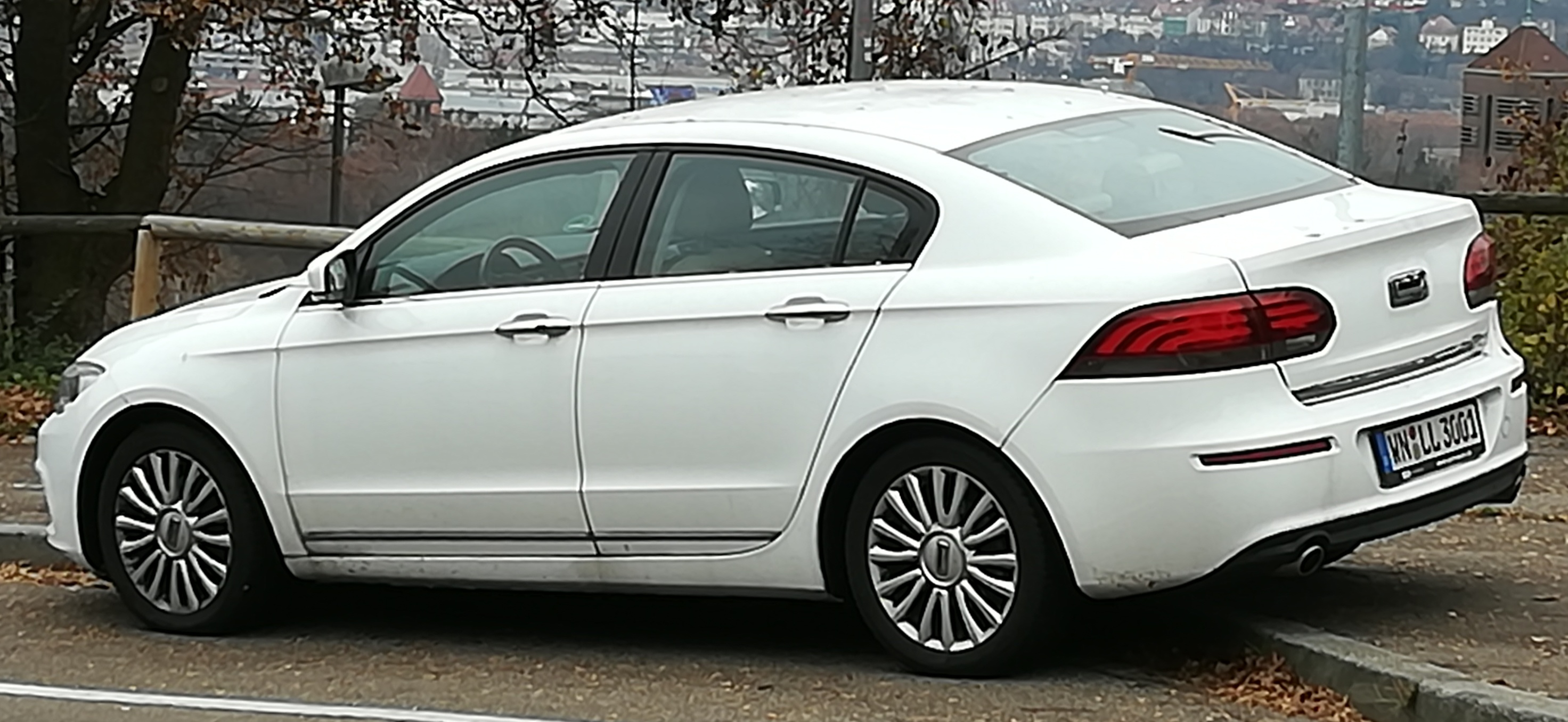
Qoros 3 Sedan

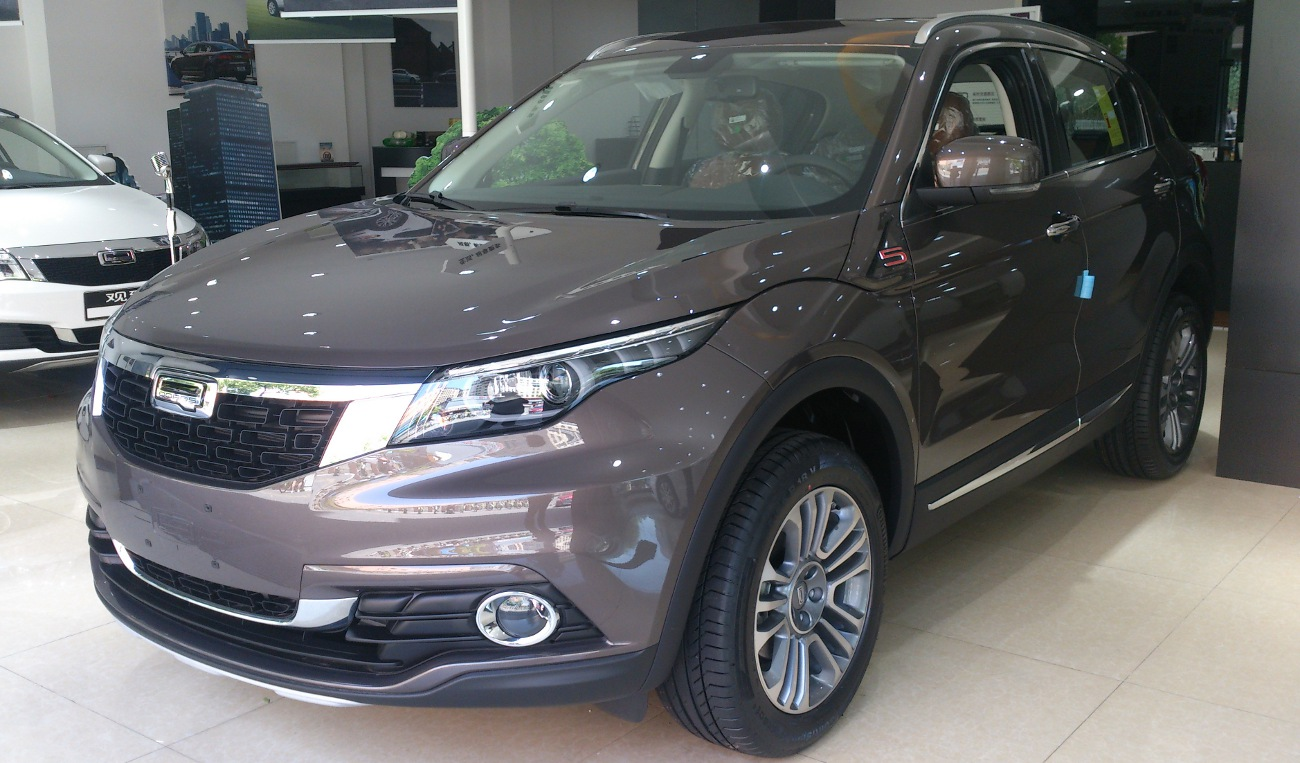
Qoros 5

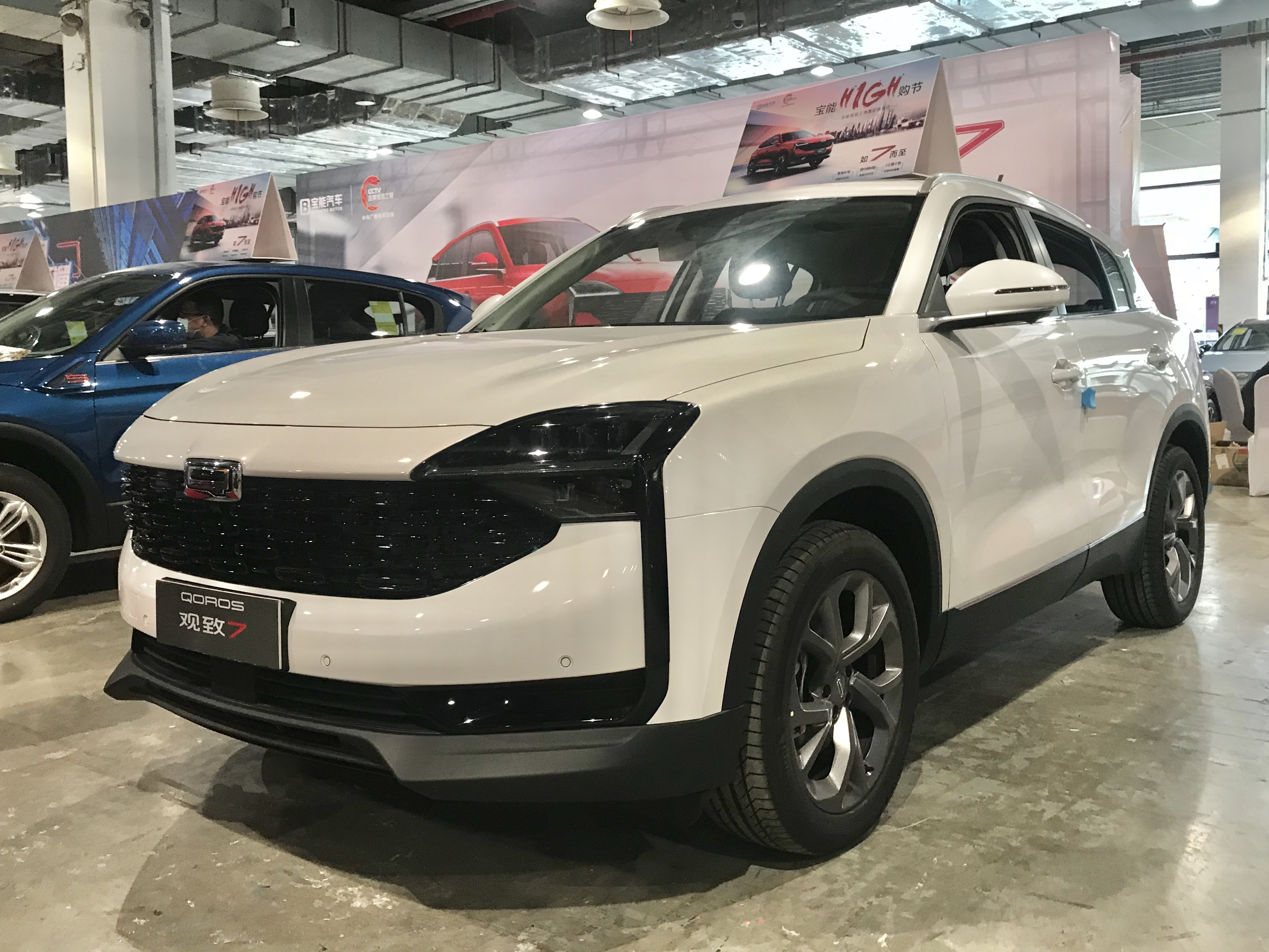
Qoros 7

== Concept models ==
=== eBIQE ===
At the 2014 Geneva Motor Show, Qoros displayed a concept electric bicycle called the eBIQE.

=== Qoros 2 Concept ===
The Qoros 2 was first displayed at the 2015 Geneva Motor Show as a concept plug-in hybrid SUV.

=== Qoros Mile 1 Concept ===
At the 2018 Beijing Auto Show, Qoros displayed a concept GT called the Qoros Mile 1 Concept.

=== Qoros Mile II Concept ===
At the 2019 Shanghai Auto Show, Qoros displayed a concept shootingbrake called the Qoros Mile II Concept.

=== Qoros Milestone Concept ===
At the 2020 Beijing Auto Show, Qoros displayed a concept sedan called the Qoros Milestone Concept.

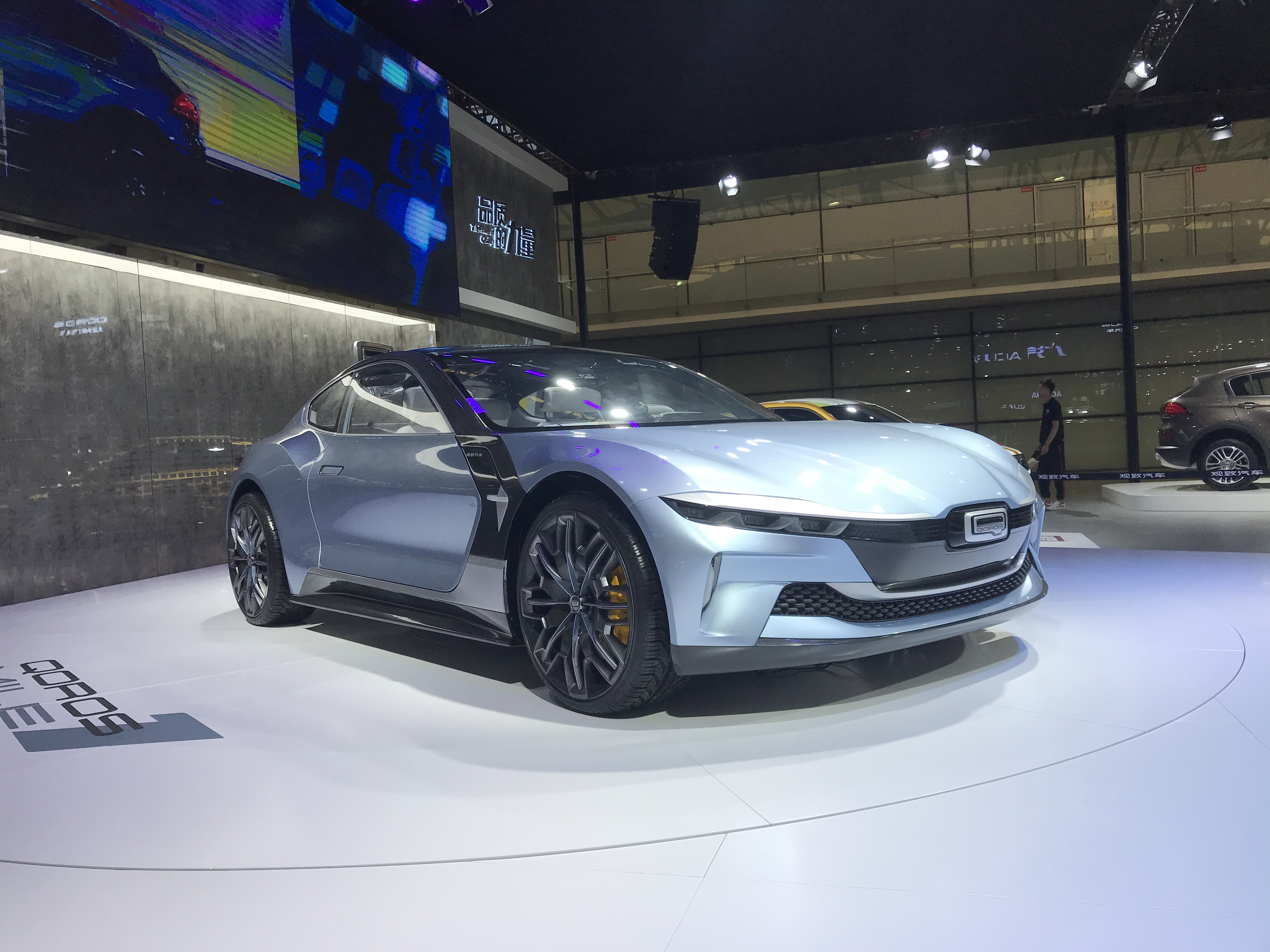
Qoros Mile 1

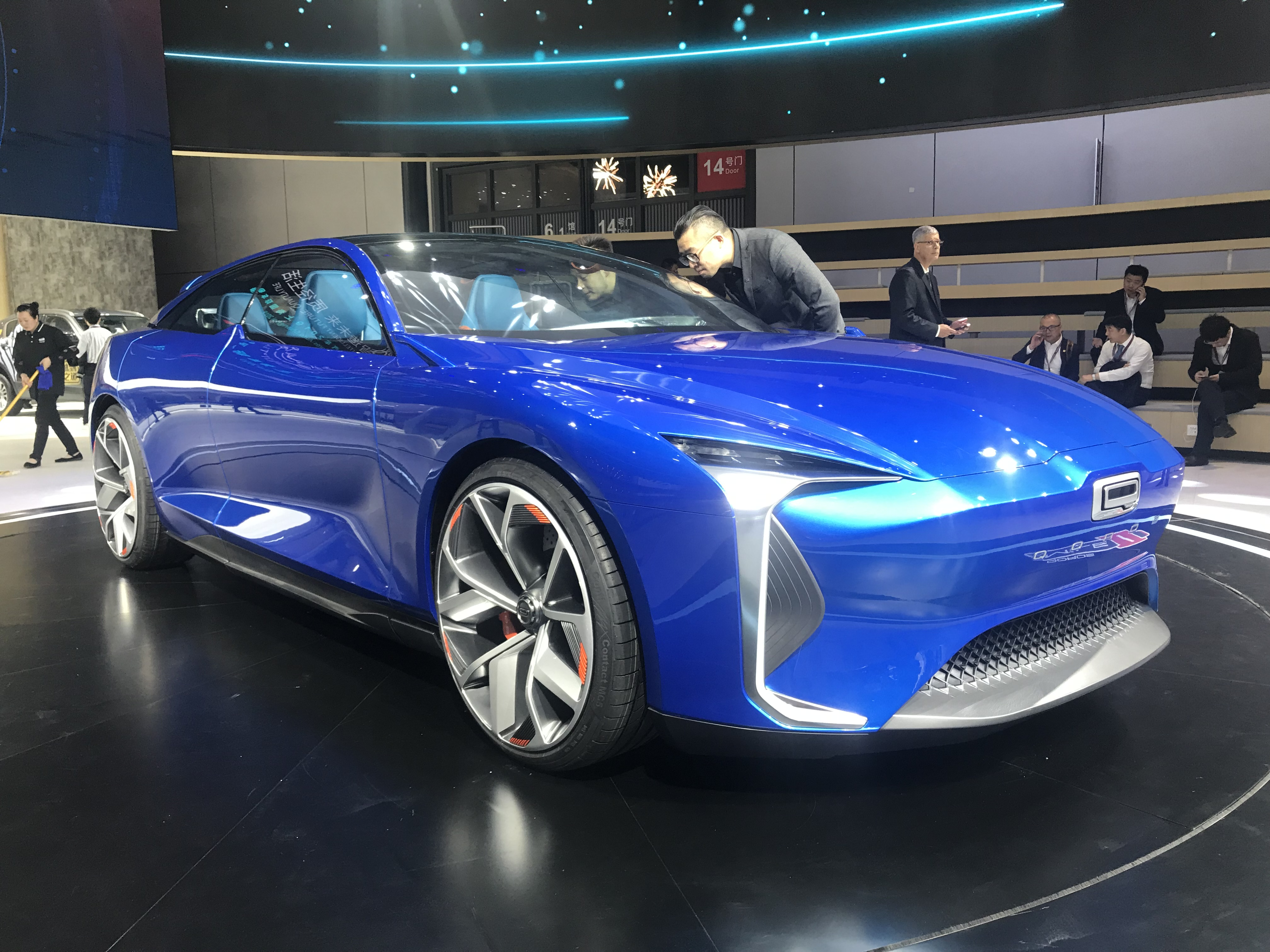
Qoros Mile II

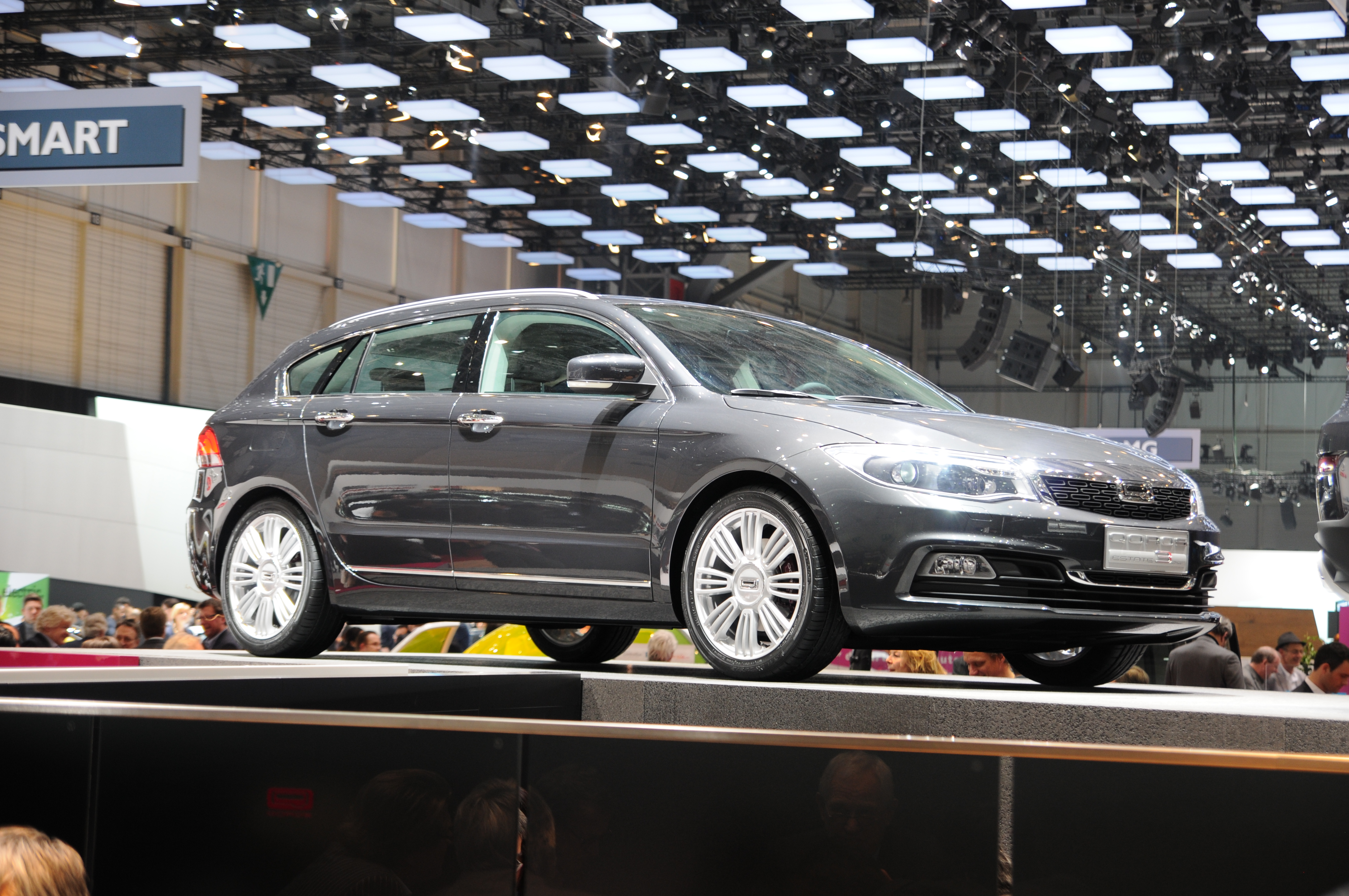
Qoros 3 Estate Concept
