= Mini Coupé and Roadster =

Mini Coupé Mini Roadster
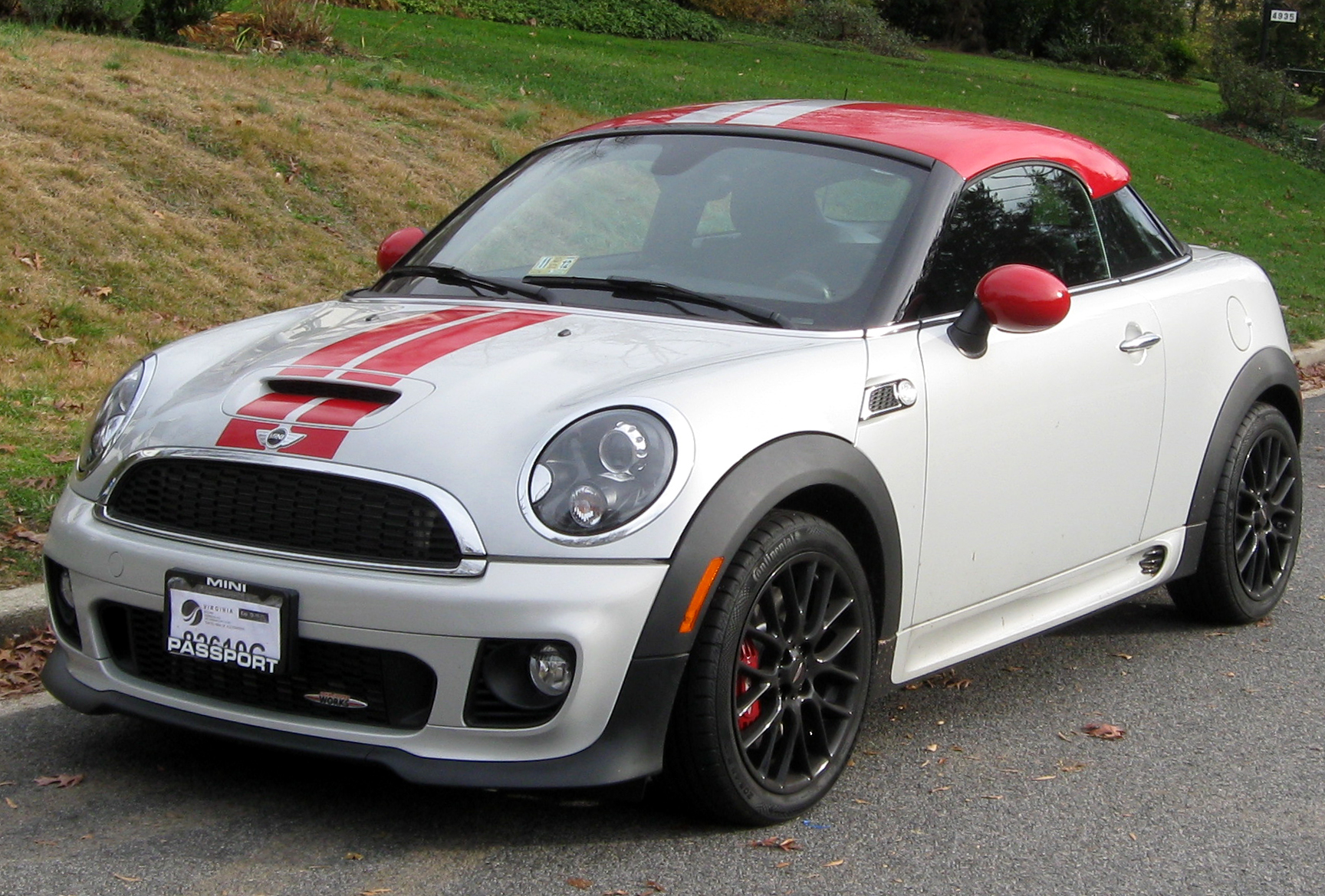

Overview
- Manufacturer: BMW (Mini)
- Production: 2011–2015 (Coupé); 2012–2015 (Roadster)
- Model years: 2012–2015
- Assembly: United Kingdom: Cowley, Oxfordshire (Plant Oxford)
- Designer: Gert Hildebrand

Body and chassis
- Class: Sports car (S)
- Body style: 2-door coupé 2-door roadster
- Layout: Front-engine, front-wheel-drive
- Related: Mini Hatch

Powertrain
- Engine: 1.6 L BMW/PSA I4 Prince N18 (turbocharged petrol); 2.0 L BMW I4 N47 D20 (Turbo diesel)
- Transmission: 6-speed manual 6-speed Steptronic automatic

Dimensions
- Wheelbase: 97.1 in (2,466 mm)
- Length: 146.8 in (3,729 mm); Roadster S: 147.0 in (3,734 mm); JCW: 148.0 in (3,759 mm)
- Width: 66.3 in (1,684 mm)
- Height: 54.5 in (1,384 mm); JCW Convertible: 54.8 in (1,392 mm); Roadster S: 54.7 in (1,389 mm); Base Coupé: 54.6 in (1,387 mm)

Chronology
- Successor: Mini Hatch F55/56/57

The Mini Coupé and Mini Roadster are two-seater sports cars that were engineered and manufactured by German automaker BMW under the Mini marque between 2011 and 2015.

The hardtop Coupé was unveiled in June 2011 and formally launched at the Frankfurt Motor Show in September 2011. Production was shown in the 2011 documentary Megafactories. It is the first two-seater Mini. It was joined by a convertible version called Mini Roadster in 2012, following its showing as a concept car in 2009. The Coupé is known by the internal code R58 and the Roadster by code R59.

In February 2015, Mini announced the end of production for both models.

== Coupé ==
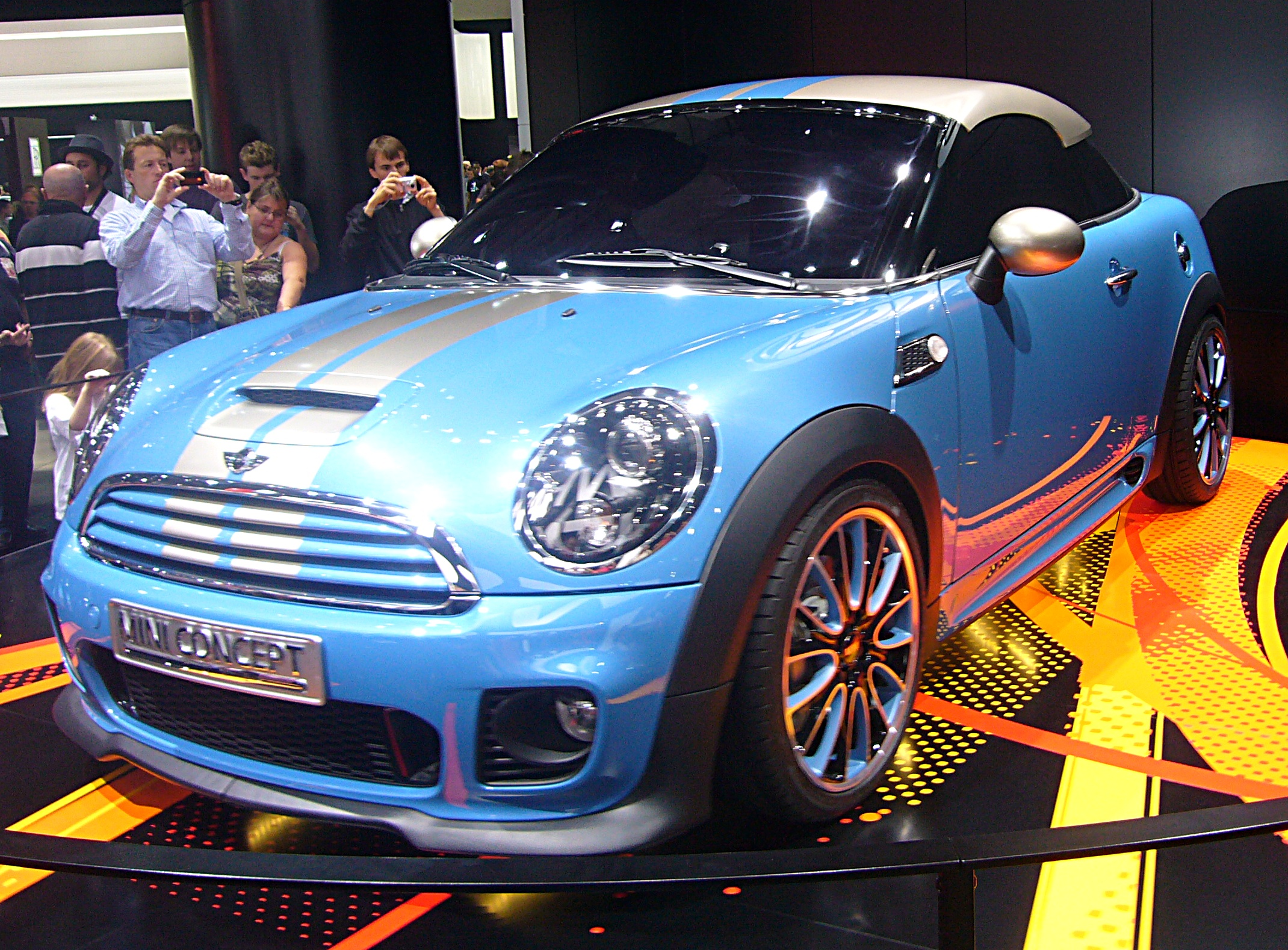
In 2009, 50 years after the Mini's 26 August 1959 'birthday', a celebratory Mini coupé concept was shown

The Coupé, which went on sale in the UK from 1 October 2011, is based on the Mini Cabriolet, but with only two seats allowing a bigger boot of 280 litres (9.9 cubic feet). The Coupé's windscreen is angled rearwards by 13 degrees more than in the cabrio's and the roof is 29 mm (1.1 inches) lower than standard Mini Hatch. The rear spoiler rises automatically at speeds above 50 mph (80 km/h). or with the use of a toggle switch above the rear view mirror.

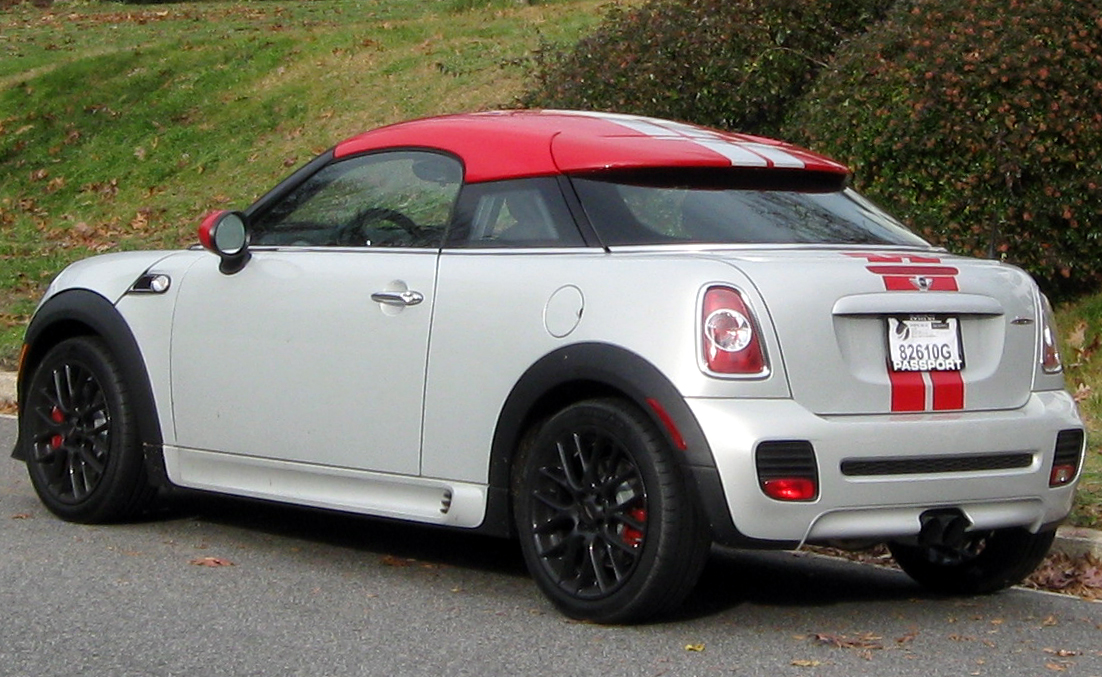
Rear view of Coupé JCW

The range of the Coupé follows a similar pattern to other Mini models; featuring Cooper, Cooper S, Cooper SD and the range-topping John Cooper Works (JCW). The JCW version accelerates from 0 to 62 mph (0 to 100 km/h) in 6.4 seconds and a top speed of 149 mph (240 km/h) thanks to a turbocharged 208 bhp (155 kW; 211 PS) 1,598 cc four-cylinder. The Cooper SD is a 2.0 L turbo diesel producing 141 bhp (105 kW; 143 PS) available in some markets. All are equipped with a six-speed manual gearbox with the option of six-speed Steptronic automatic.

== Roadster ==
The Mini Roadster is the convertible version of the Coupé and was first shown at the Frankfurt Motor Show in September 2009 as a concept, and formally launched at the Detroit North American International Auto Show in January 2012.

The range of models and engines mirrors the Mini Coupé with a range of 1.6 L petrol engines in various levels of power and a 2.0 L diesel engine offered in some markets.

Depending on the market, the soft top is either manually or electrically operated. The electrically operated top required the driver to unlock it and then could be opened using a toggle switch above the rear view mirror. Once fully open the top would sit flat behind the driver, a significant change from the R57 Convertible, which stowed the convertible top within view above the "boot." The convertible top included a rear window but did not include a window behind the driver's door. The soft top was only available in black.

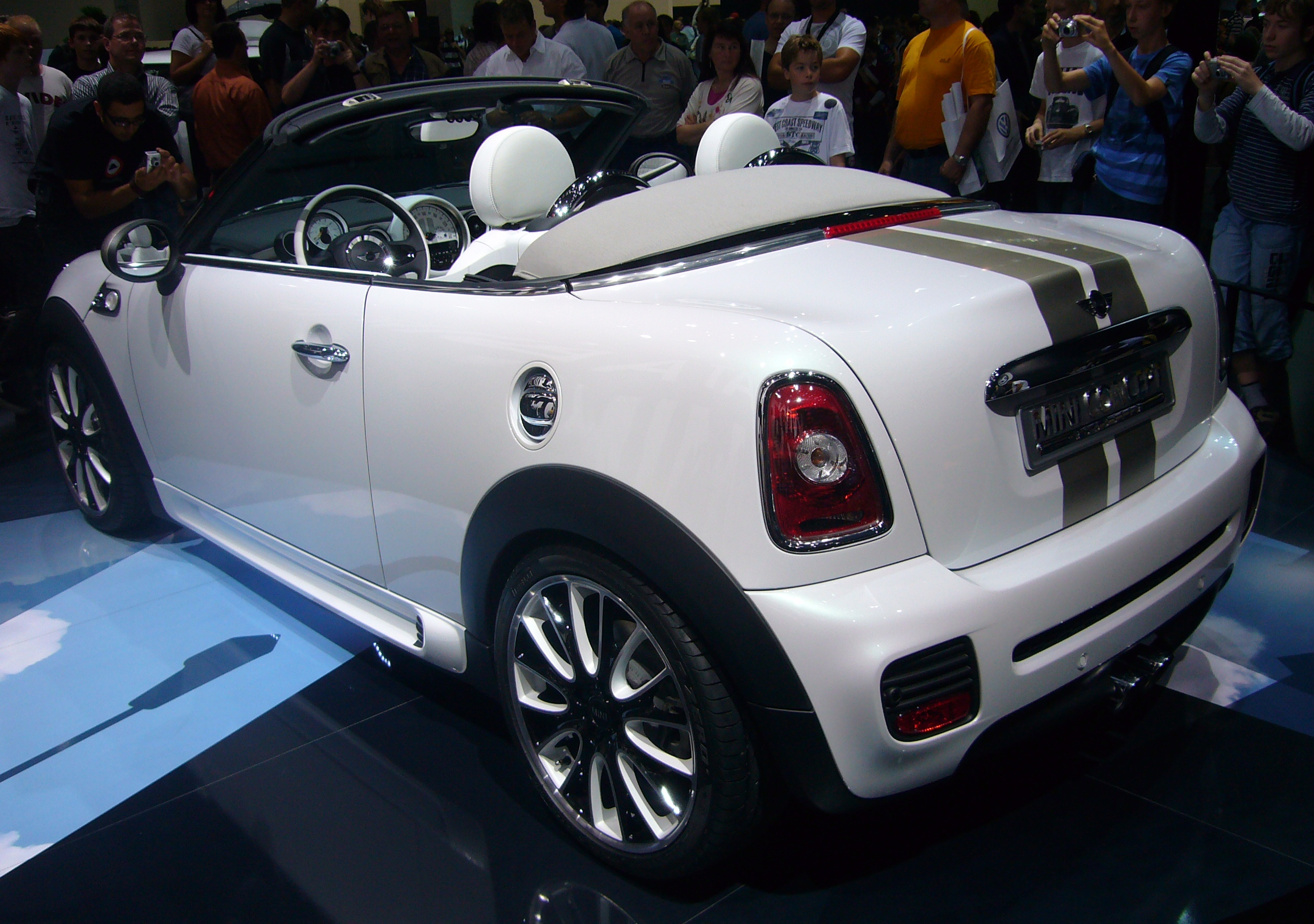
A 2012 Mini Cooper Roadster

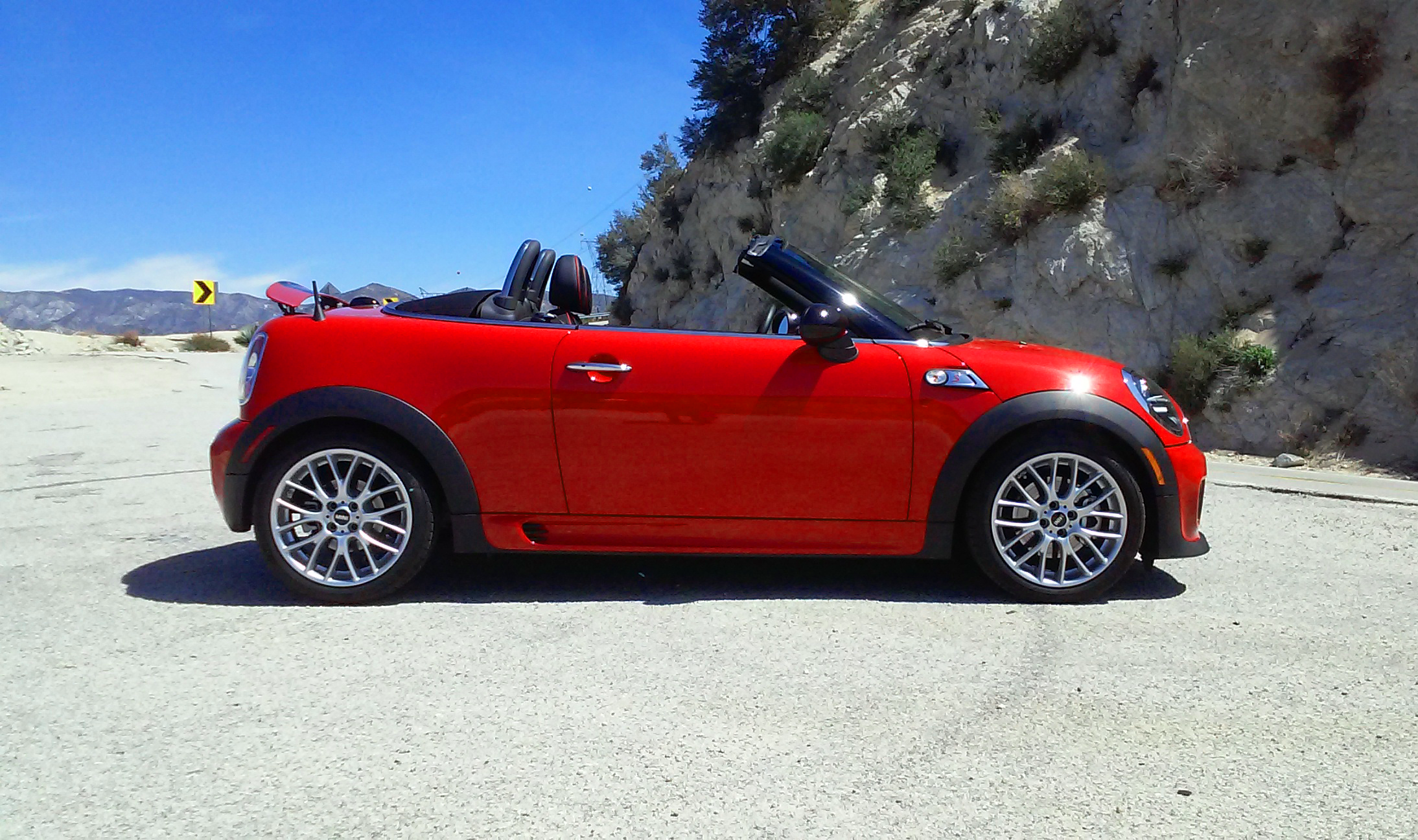
2014 MINI Cooper Roadster S

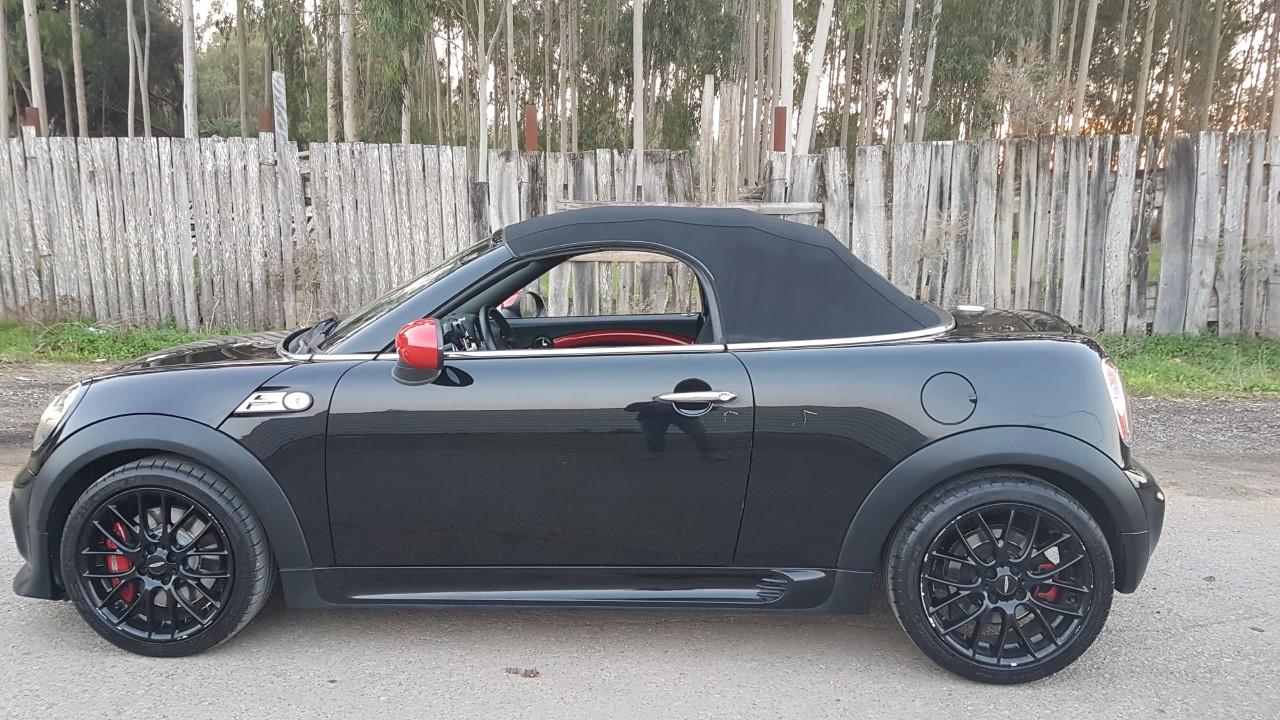
2014, John Cooper Works
