= Kenon Holdings =

Public corporation owned by Idan Ofer

- Type: Public
- Traded as: NYSE: KEN
- Founded: 2014; 12 years ago
- Headquarters: Singapore
- Key people: Idan Ofer (owner); Robert L. Rosen (CEO); Deepa Joseph (CFO)
- Revenue: ▲US$872 million (2025)
- Net income: ▼US$66.3 million (2025)
- Owner: Idan Ofer (58%)
- Website: kenon-holdings.com

Kenon Holdings is a public corporation, which is a spin off from Israel Corporation, traded on the New York Stock Exchange and the Tel Aviv Stock Exchange. Owned by Israeli businessman Idan Ofer, it controls Israel Corp's investment in companies such as Qoros.

== Overview ==
The company was founded in 2014 as a spin off from the Israel Corporation. In 2017, it announced plans to build Kiryat Gat power station in Israel.

Headquartered at the Millenia Tower in Singapore, it employs 5,766 and is traded both on the New York Stock Exchange and the Tel Aviv Stock Exchange as KEN.

The holding includes investments in Zim Integrated Shipping Services, and OPC Energy Ltd.

== See also ==
- List of companies of Singapore
