= Isramco =

American Israeli publicly traded master limited partnership

Isramco Negev 2 LP
- Type: Public
- Traded as: Nasdaq: ISRL; TASE: ISRA.L
- Industry: Oil and gas industry
- Founded: 1989; 37 years ago
- Founder: Joe Elmaliach, Armand Hammer
- Headquarters: Petah Tikva,, Israel, Houston, United States
- Key people: Haim Tsuff (chairman)
- Products: Natural gas
- Revenue: ▲₪ 1,539 million (2015)
- Net income: ▲₪ 1,043 million (2015)
- Total assets: ▲₪ 5,905 million (2015)
- Total equity: ▲₪ 3,140 million (2015)
- Number of employees: 25

Isramco Negev 2 LP (Hebrew: ישראמקו)(TASE: ISRA.L) is an American Israeli publicly traded master limited partnership that holds interests in oil and gas properties in Israel. The partnership shares are traded on the Tel Aviv Stock Exchange and have been a constituent of the TA-35 Index since January 2010. The partnership was founded by Isramco Inc. (Nasdaq: ISRL) and other parties in 1989.

== History ==
=== Early years ===
In 1982, Jerusalem-born businessman Joseph Elmaleh founded Jerusalem Oil Exploration, Ltd. (J.O.E.L.), a company engaged in exploration of oil and gas in Israel. The same year, Elmaleh formed a joint venture company with veteran oil tycoon Armand Hammer, named Isramco Inc., in which J.O.E.L. held 35%.

From 1982 to 1985, Isramco Inc. drilled four wells onshore in Israel, but only approximately 9,000 Barrels were produced in total and none of the wells sustained commercial production. In 1985 Isramco and other parties formed the Negev 1 Limited Partnership to continue oil and gas exploration activities in Israel. These parties included J.O.E.L., Delek - The Israel Fuel Corporation Ltd., Naphtha Israel Petroleum Corporation Ltd. amongst others.

The Negev 1 Partnership spent approximately $19.2 million for oil and gas exploration activities, including seismic exploration, and drilled two wells, both of which were dry holes. The Negev 1 Partnership had no revenues from its activities and its operations were terminated in 1988.

=== Founding Isramco Negev 2 Partnership ===
Following the disbandment of the Negev 1 partnership in 1988, the Isramco Negev 2 Partnership was formed by the same participants one year later, in 1989. The partnership initially held two exploration licenses - Negev Nirim and Negev Ashkelon in which two offshore wells (Yam 1 and Yam 2) were drilled and seismic and geological studies, both onshore and offshore, were conducted at a cost of $44.55 million. The financing for the exploration came from the sale of the limited partnership's units on the Tel Aviv Stock Exchange, which were mainly bought by small investors hoping for quick profit from the impending oil discoveries. Isramco created two additional companies: Isramco Oil and Gas Ltd., to act as the general partner for the limited partnership, and Isramco Management (1988) Ltd., to act as the nominee holder of the limited partnership units held by public investors in Israel. During 1992 and 1993 the sale of Isramco Negev 2 Limited Partnership units to the public in Israel raised approximately $123 million.

In 1993, the Isramco Negev 2 partnership participants were granted five new offshore exploration licenses in the Mediterranean Sea: Med Tel Aviv License, Med Yavne License, Med Ashdod License, Med Hadera License, and Med Hasharon License, covering additional vast areas from the initial licenses. The same year gas flares could clearly be seen from the Yam 2 well, off the Israeli coast, and the price of partnership's units shot up by thousands of percent. But in February 1994, the partnership announced that the discovery was not economically viable and its share price crashed. Isramco was blamed for misleading investors and enthusiasm for investing in oil exploration in Israel faded away for many years.

=== Change of ownership ===
In August 1995, Joe Elmaliach sold his controlling stake in J.O.E.L. - Jerusalem Oil Exploration Ltd. and its subsidiaries, which in addition to Isramco Inc., included two former state-owned companies - Naphtha Israel Petroleum Corporation and Israel Oil Exploration Ltd. for $17 million to Pass-port Ltd, a company controlled at the time by Yuval Ran. During the subsequent months, control of Pass-port, J.O.E.L., Naptha, and other Isramco-related companies was taken over by businessmen Haim Tsuff and Jackob (Koby) Maimon.

=== Subsequent activities ===
In 1997 Isramco Inc.'s activities were expanded to the United States through the acquisition of several interests in oil and gas properties there. (In later years Isramco Inc. activities focused exclusively on the USA, while Isramco Negev 2 partnership continued exploring for oil and gas in Israel).

In 1998, Isramco drilled the Gevim 1 well located onshore approximately 2 kilometers south of the city of Sderot to a depth of 15,157 feet. The well was declared a dry hole. The total cost of the well was approximately $6.6 million.

During the next 10 years Isramco Negev 2 partnership continued its offshore exploration activities in the eastern Mediterranean, with partners Delek Group and the British BG Group. In 2001, BG conducted 3D seismic studies that indicated the significant potential of the Tamar and Dalit gas fields. However, exploratory drilling of these fields was delayed by the withdrawal of BG from the partnership in 2005 and was only begun after Noble Energy joined the partnership in 2007.

In 2009, exploratory drilling of the Tamar gas field verified the earlier expectations. The gas field is located roughly 50 miles (80 km) west of Haifa in waters 5,500 feet (1,700 m) deep. The first well, Tamar 1, was drilled to a depth of 16,076 feet (4,900 m). The deposits contained 8.3 trillion cubic feet (240 billion cubic metres) of natural gas. Production is expected to begin in 2012 and gas delivered to Israel via a sub-sea pipeline.

At the time of discovery, Tamar gas field was the largest organic find ever discovered in the under-explored area of the Mediterranean Sea and the largest discovery in the history of Noble Energy. Noble Energy operates Tamar with a 36% working interest; Isramco Negev 2 LP holds 28.75%; Delek Drilling holds 15.63%; Avner Oil Exploration holds 15.63%; and Dor Gas Exploration holds the remaining 4%.

== Oil and gas properties ==
- Tamar gas field 28.75%
- Orr gas field 50%

== Controversies ==
In Aug 16, 2004, Isramco, Inc. restated its financial results for three quarters in 2003 to reflect its adoption of the Statement of Financial Accounting Standards No.143 "Accounting for Asset Retirement Obligations". The restatements decreased net income for each quarter.

== See also ==
- List of oil exploration and production companies
