= NewMed Energy =

Israeli oil and gas company

NewMed Energy LP
- Type: Limited Partnership
- Traded as: TASE: NWMD
- Industry: Oil and gas industry
- Founded: 1993; 33 years ago
- Headquarters: Herzliya, Israel
- Key people: Yossi Abu, CEO
- Products: Natural gas
- Revenue: ₪ 1.006 billion(2018)
- Net income: ₪ 819.34 million(2018)
- Total assets: ₪ 12.832 billion(2018)
- Total equity: ₪ 3.06 billion(2018)
- Website: https://newmedenergy.com/

NewMed Energy (Hebrew: ניו מד אנרג'י)(TASE: NWMD), formerly Delek Drilling, is an Israeli energy oil & gas partnership in the exploration, development, and production of natural gas and oil. Delek group owned by Yitzhak Tshuva, is the controlling shareholder of the partnership. The partnership is traded on the Tel Aviv Stock Exchange and is part of the TA 35 Index.

== History ==
NewMed Energy (formerly "Delek Drilling") was founded by Avinoam Finkelman and served as the search department of the Delek group, then controlled by the IDB group. The partnership was founded with an agreement signed on July 1, 1993, between Delek Drilling Management (1993) Ltd as a general partner and Delek Drilling Trusts Ltd as a limited partner. The partnership's holdings include Yam Tethys Ltd, Delek Drilling (Leviathan Finance) Ltd, Delek Drilling (Yam Tethys Finance) Ltd, Delek and Avner Yam Tethys Ltd and Delek Drilling (Tamar Finance) Ltd.

In 1998, Yitzhak Tshuva, a self-made multi-billionaire, purchased control of Delek group, from the Recanati family.

In December 2016 the general meeting of Delek Drilling and Avner gas and oil search (both units of conglomerate Delek Group) decided on the merge of the two. In May 2017 the Merging process was completed when Avner was immersed into Delek Drilling. This established the position of Delek Drilling as the leading search body in Israel.

The participating units of the partnership are traded on the Tel Aviv Stock Exchange, and it is considered one of the ten largest bodies of trade in the Tel Aviv Stock exchange market.

In October 2017, Delek Drilling and the Russian Gazprom signed a memorandum of understanding to jointly examine the possibilities of using natural gas as a fuel for vehicles and special equipment in Israel.

In February 2022, as part of a rebranding process, the company changed its name from Delek Drilling to NewMed Energy. At the same time, New Med Energy updated its strategy, which includes, in addition to the exploration and production of natural gas in the Mediterranean, the establishment of an activity of alternative energies, the deepening of regional ties and more.

In January 2026, it was announced that NewMed Energy had agreed to sell a 5 per cent participating interest in the Han Asparuh offshore exploration block in the Bulgarian Black Sea to Bulgarian Energy Holding EAD. The agreement followed a directive from the Bulgarian parliament and remained conditional on government approval and revisions to the project’s joint operating agreement.

=== The Gas Framework ===
In December 2015, the Israeli Government approved the Natural Gas Framework, which constitutes a comprehensive regulation. Main principles of the Framework was that Delek must sell all their rights in the small fields Tanin and Karish within a specified 14 month timeframe. Delek Group must sell all of its rights in the Tamar field and Noble Energy must sell at least 11% of its rights by December 2021.

In 2016, Karish and Tanin Gas reserves were sold to Energean Energean Oil & Gas. The deal followed the natural gas framework requiring Delek Drilling and Noble Energy to sell these two reservoirs, which contain 60 BCM of gas, for $148 million.

In 2017, sale of 9.25% of the holdings of Delek Drilling in the Tamar reservoir to the Tamar Petroleum partnership was completed for $980 million.

In February 2018, a deal worth over 15 billion dollars, was signed with the Egyptian company Dolphinos which includes the sale of gas for 10 years and a total amount of 64 BCM.

New Med Energy's compliance with the Gas Framework was finally completed in 2021, with the signing of an agreement to sell its holdings in the Tamar gas reservoir (22%) to the Abu Dhabi-based Mubadala Petroleum Company for approximately one billion dollars.

== Discoveries ==
In 2009, Delek Drilling and Avner, played a leading role in discovering the Tamar gas reservoir alongside its partners Noble Energy, Isramco and Dor. The discovered reservoir, 4.5 kilometers deep in a 1,700 meters deep waters, was the biggest deep waters discovery in 2009 worldwide. In 2010 the Leviathan gas field, twice the size of the Tamar gas field, was discovered by a partnership which included Delek Drilling, Avner, Ratio and Noble Energy.

=== Discoveries by chronological order ===
- 1999 – Noa reservoir, discovered in cooperation with the American drilling company Noble Energy.
- 2000 – Mary-B reservoir which together with the Noa reservoir combines the Yam Tethys project.
- 2009 – Dalit and Tamar reservoirs, discovered by Delek Drilling in cooperation with Avner, Noble Energy, Isramco and Dor, containing 306 BCM.
- 2010 – Leviathan reservoir, discovered by Delek Drilling in cooperation with Noble Energy, Avner, Ratio, containing 608 BCM.
- 2012 – Tanin reservoir, discovered by Delek Drilling in cooperation with Avner and Noble Energy containing 35 BCM.

Energean bought Karish and Tanin reservoirs from Delek Drilling and plans to invest about $1.8 billion in developing them.

== Exporting Gas ==
Jordanian firms Arab Potash and Jordan Bromine signed a deal in 2014 to import 2 billion cubic metres of gas from Israel's Tamar field over 15 years. the gas is technically being sold to the Jordanians by the American company, Noble Energy (on behalf of the Israeli partners), and not directly by the Tamar partners which include Delek Drilling, Noble energy and Isramco. The flow of natural gas began in January 2017, marking the country's first ever exports of natural gas.

After developing the different reservoirs, an agreement signed in September 2016 finalized the export of natural gas to the Jordanian electricity company NEPCO from the Leviathan gas field for a time period of 15 years and at a total amount of approximately 45 BCM.

A large scale agreement worth over $15 billion was signed in February 2018 and included gas transactions for 10 years for the amount of 64 BCM with the Egyptian company Dolphinos. The Egyptian president, Abdel Fatah al-Sissi, addressed the deal: "It Has a lot of advantages for us (Egyptians), and I want people to be reassured."

In September 2018, Delek Drilling and Noble Energy announced that together with Egyptian company EastMed, they were acquiring a 39% stake in the EMG Egypt-Israel gas pipeline in order to fulfil their deal with Egypt's Dolphinus.

== See also ==
- Energy in Israel
- Natural gas in Israel
- Energy Triangle
- Leviathan gas field
