= Yossi Abu =

Israeli executive

- יוסי אבו
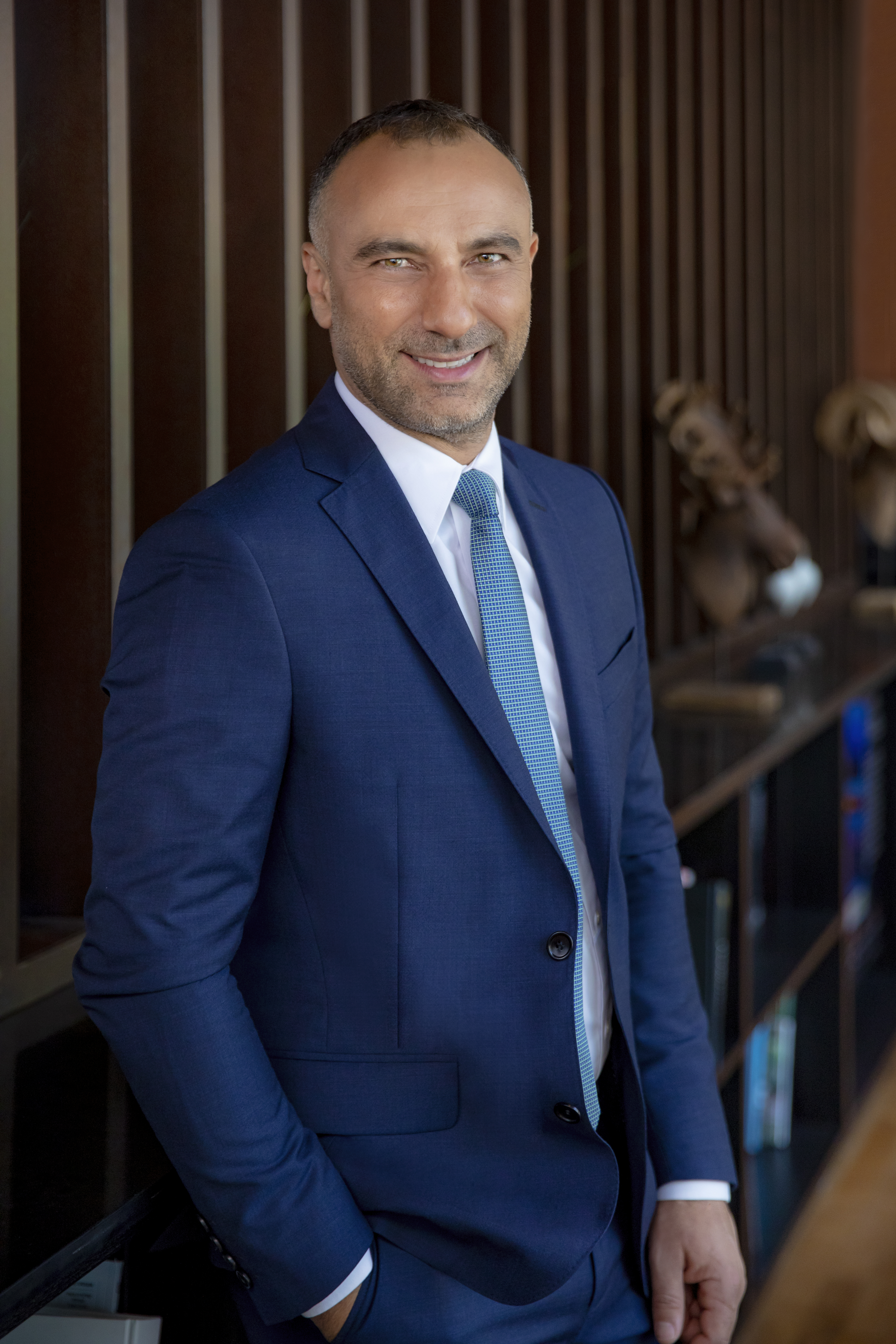
- Yossi Abu, 2020
- Born: July 9, 1977 (age 49)
- Education: Hebrew University of Jerusalem
- Occupations: CEO of NewMed Energy (Delek Drilling); Chair of Tamar Petruleum; Former CEO of Avner Oil & Gas

Yossi Abu (Hebrew: יוסי אבו; born December 7, 1977) is an Israeli businessman. He is chief executive officer of NewMed Energy (formerly Delek Drilling) of the Delek corporation. He was an adviser of Minister of Finance, Roni Bar-On.

== Biography ==
Yossi Abu was born in the Jerusalem District. Abu has a bachelor's degree in law from the Hebrew University of Jerusalem, which he graduated with honors, and he completed an internship in law at the lawyer's office Yigal Arnon in Tel Aviv.

== Public service and business career ==
In 2007–2009 Abu was an adviser to the Israeli Minister of Finance, Roni Bar-On (of the 17th Knesset of Israel). In March 2009 he was appointed to Commerce and Regulations manager at Delek Energy.

In 2011 he was promoted to the position of NewMed Energy (Delek Drilling) CEO.

Abu led the development of the Tamar gas field, which was the first major off-shore natural gas finding in Israel, and today generates more than 60% of Israel's electricity. In 2010, he led the exploratory project that led to the discovery of the Leviathan Natural Gas reservoir – one of the world's largest offshore gas findings in recent years.

He led the financing of the Leviathan Project in the amount of $1.75 billion (The total investment in the first stage of the project was $3.75 billion), and the negotiations with Jordan and Egypt on signing regional export agreements of natural gas from Tamar and Leviathan Reservoirs with an estimated worth of $15 billion.

In 2016–2017, he was also CEO of Avner Oil and Gas until its merger with NewMed Energy (Delek Drilling) was signalized <-. From 2017 Abu is chair of Tamar petroleum (resigned during the year 2019) and as of 2018 he is also CEO of Delek Energy.

In September 2021, he signed the sale of Newmed Energy's holdings (22%) in the Tamar gas field to the Emirati's Mubadala Petroleum. The total value of the transaction is estimated at 1.1 billion dollars, and it is considered the largest commercial agreement signed between the United Arab Emirates and Israel since the signing of the Abraham Agreement in September 2020. With the sale of the holdings, NewMed Energy fully fulfilled its obligation in the gas plan, which was approved by the government.

In August 2022, Abu signed a memorandum of understanding with Enlight on a joint venture to establish green energy projects in Egypt, the United Arab Emirates, Morocco and more. Abu also leads the partnership for trading on the London Stock Exchange.
