= Aziza Mariam Albachir =

Chadian politician

- Born: December 1978 (age 47)
- Citizenship: Chadian
- Occupation: Politician

Aziza Mariam Albachir (born December 1978) is a Chadian politician. She was briefly minister of petroleum in January 2019.

== Education ==
She holds a master's degree in business administration from Rice University in Houston and a master's degree in finance from the Paris School of Management and Finance.

== Career ==
She began her career as an accounting supervisor at Exxon Mobil in Houston, USA, before landing several jobs at oil sites in Algeria, Equatorial Guinea and Malaysia.

From 1998 to 2019, she held various positions in the oil and energy sector, in several countries - Chad, Equatorial Guinea, Gabon, South Sudan, Algeria, Libya, Malaysia, United States - on behalf of multinational oil companies - ExxonMobil Production, HESS Corporation, Noble Energy, Glencore, Chevron, Petronas etc.

Between July 2011 and February 2015, she served as Chief Financial Officer of Glencore in Chad.

From 2019 to 2024 in Niger, she held the position of Senior Technical Advisor for UNDP, responsible for the formulation and implementation of the Stabilization, Conflict Prevention and Peacebuilding Programme, in close collaboration with various partners.

She has participated in major negotiations of oil and gas contracts and joint venture agreements, coordinated/planned and advised on the development and implementation of national policies in the fields of energy and natural resources. She has monitored and advised states and oil companies on issues of regulatory compliance, financing, taxation and oil cost recovery.

She was minister of petroleum of Chad between 21 and 31 January 2019.
