= NFTA (disambiguation) =

The Niagara Frontier Transportation Authority is responsible for public transportation oversight of Erie and Niagara counties in the American state of New York.

NFTA may also refer to:

- Naphtha Explorations Limited Partnership, ticker symbol in the TA-100 Israeli stockmarket index
- Nondeterministic finite tree automaton, investigated in theoretical computer science and formal language theory, see Tree automaton#Definitions
- Nuova ferrovia transalpina, Italian name of Switzerland's north–south rail tunnel project NRLA
