= Energy Triangle =

Natural gas extraction plan between Cyprus, Israel, and Greece

The Energy Triangle is a natural gas extraction plan between the three allied countries Cyprus, Israel, and Greece. The three countries agreed to use the gas fields Tamar, Leviathan, and Aphrodite; found in 2009, 2010, and 2011 respectively. About 40 trillion cubic feet (tcf) of natural gas were found between Cyprus and Israel, giving both countries an upper hand in the trading business within the region. Europe requires 19 tcf of natural gas a year and the Cypriot government believes that its Exclusive Economic Zone (EEZ) holds 60 tcf; Cyprus pursued this financially beneficial option for the Energy Triangle to provide energy for the European Union.

== Term ==
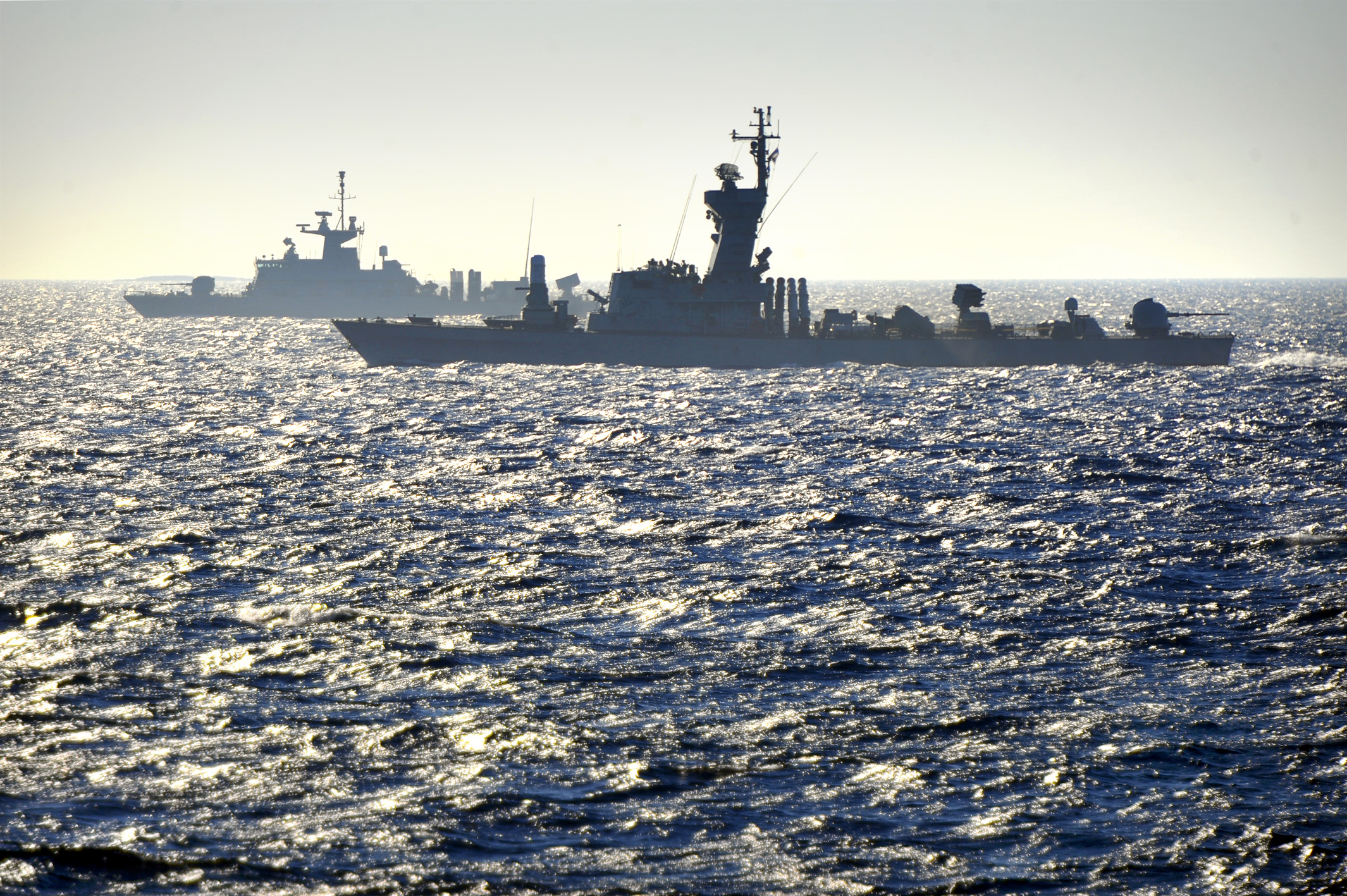
Greek and Israeli naval forces in a joint drill conducted in the area

The term "Energy Triangle," was first issued at the Cyprus-Israel Business Association in Nicosia, Cyprus in 2010. Due to the joint establishment of the Exclusive Economic Zone between Cyprus and Israel, this marked the beginning of increased collaboration between the two Mediterranean neighbors. Both countries agreed to a joint extraction of natural gas by the American company Noble Energy in order to reduce the financial burden of extraction by both countries. Greece joined Israel and Cyprus in the plan to export natural gas to Europe by 2015 through a power plant close to Limassol in 2011.

Natural gas evidence was mounting for the existence of oil in the Levantine Basin. Meanwhile, Noble Energy, which has been working with the Leviathan site since its discovery in 2010, in early 2017 began drilling. Several factors point to oil and gas reserves, such as the discovery of thermogenic natural gas, working hydrocarbon systems, and the identification of at least 14 hydrocarbon plays in the Cyprus EEZ alone. According to Dr. Constantinos Hadjistassou, academic at the University of Nicosia, oil could be extracted within a shorter frame than natural gas, in Cyprus.

== Volume of gas fields ==
The gas reserve is estimated to have around 122 trillion cubic feet of undiscovered resources in the Levant Basin. After drilling no wells and locating no target drilling areas, Total relinquished Cyprus's Block 10 with no reserves found and, in March 2015, signed for continuing its exploration of Cyprus's Block 11 until February 2016. Noble Energy and Delek Group are the most competitive companies bidding for offshore exploration licenses in both Cyprus and Israel.

The two companies, along with other explorers, have discovered a reported 26 trillion cubic feet of gas in the Leviathan and Tamar fields worth some 200 billion euros at today's prices. This is enough gas to supply Israel's needs for 150 years and Cyprus for 200 years. In August, 2015 at Egypt's EEZ, located only 6 km from Cyprus's Block 11, Eni discovered the Zohr field's estimated 30 tcf of natural gas in the Shorouk concession.

Licensing for blocks has been expedited by the Cypriot presidential election that is coming up in 2018, with a specific focus on blocks 10 and 11. The cost per drillship is expected to be around 80 million euros; funds must be found for this and drilling must be pursued before project plans can be finalized. The depth of the water column is of serious concern for the engineers working on the project.

== Export of natural gas ==
The exclusive economic zone between Israel and Cyprus as signed in Nicosia

Energy Ministers of Cyprus and Israel in 2011 announced that the countries will export some of their gas, reportedly examining plans to ship liquefied natural gas, or LNG.

The Cypriot media reported that the country could receive natural gas from Israel in early 2015 at reduced prices, if discussions on the supply of small quantities were completed by 2012. This plan stated that Cyprus would import by ship enough natural gas to power its 450-megawatt Vassilikos power plant.

Natural gases are beginning to deplete in Norway and the only sources of gas are from Russia, Qatar, and Algeria. These countries are not on the best political terms and the European Union would prefer not to be working with them. The EU is looking for alternatives, viewing Energy Triangle discussions as a positive. Deliberations are being held regarding the exporting of natural gas through a proposed pipeline that comprises a pipeline from Israel's Tamar, Leviathan and Cyprus Block 12 to Cyprus, where Gazprom has committed to provide a floating LNG terminal to convert Israeli and Cypriot gas for onward transmission. Then an LNG pipeline connecting Cyprus with Crete, an LNG pipeline from Crete to mainland Greece and then to Italy and Bulgaria to the rest of Europe. In October, 2015, Cyprus's Energy Minister, Giorgos Lakkotrypis, and Egypt's Minister of Petroleum, Tarek El Molla, discussed bilateral agreements over oil and gas cooperation.

On 19 October 2015, Russian President Vladimir Putin and Israeli Prime Minister Benjamin Netanyahu agreed to allow major concessions for Gazprom to develop the Leviathan reserves. However, the drilling rights were later extended to European and American partners due to sanctions against Gazprom and political roadblocks.

=== Exchange with Egypt ===
Since 2016, private energy exchange discussion has been occurring between Egypt, Cyprus, and Israel; as Egypt had been previously facing an energy crisis. When the Zohr field was found near Egypt in 2015, the three countries started considering export and transportation plans between three of their gas fields. However, the Egyptian Interim Government cancelled a twenty-year energy exchange contract with Israel in 2012. The Muslim Brotherhood had criticized Egypt for previously participating in energy relations with Israel and claimed blackouts were due to the Israeli exchange in 2010. While these exports into Egypt may be politically unwelcome, taking into consideration Israel and Egypt's current standing with each other, Egypt values this as a potential necessity as they have had repeated attacks on their Arab Gas Pipeline in Jordan.

=== Libya (GNA)–Turkey maritime deal ===
In October 2019, the UN Secretary-General, Antonio Guterres, registered the Turkey-GNA deal on the delimitation of maritime jurisdiction areas in the Mediterranean. The agreement "has been registered with the Secretariat, in accordance with Article 102 of the Charter of the United Nations," said the certificate of registration.

Nine months later, in August 2020, Greece and Egypt had signed a maritime deal, demarcating an exclusive economic zone for oil and gas drilling rights, to counter the Turkey-GNA agreement.

=== Relations with Turkey and pipeline discussions ===
While Turkey and Cyprus have been battling over land since 1974 over the Cyprus Problem, this has not stopped Turkey from wanting to benefit from the recent gas discoveries and aiming to become an energy hub.

The Mavi Marmara incident in 2010 left Arab-Israeli conflicts at a high, removing the only local alliance Israel had with Turkey. Turkey would not reinstitute the alliance unless the blockade on Gaza were to be lifted. These demands made Israel uninterested in pursuing any further relations with the country, until June 2016, when diplomatic relations were to be normalized for interest of pursuit of a pipeline to export gas into the European market.

While Turkey slowly isolated itself from neighboring countries between 2010 and 2016, Greece and Cyprus benefit economically from this new tension between Turkey and Israel. The alliance between Cyprus and Israel had previously been a politically unpopular idea based on the similarities of the Cypriot Problem and the Palestinian-Israeli conflict. When Turkey cut itself off from Israel, it aided in forming the alliance and idea of the Energy Triangle.

The pipeline previously mentioned would be hindered by the ongoing Cyprus Problem and relations with Turkey and Cyprus. The Turkish Energy Minister, Taner Yildiz, however mentioned that a solution may be found to the Cyprus Problem if an energy cooperation agreement was signed between the two countries, in 2011.

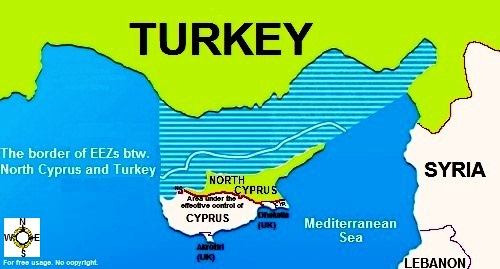
The border of EEZs as claimed by Northern Cyprus and Turkey

Strategically thinking, piping the gas through Turkey would offer the highest return as upfront investment and transportation costs would be the lowest. The period of time to build the infrastructure would be the shortest in comparison of other options.

However, the Greek Cypriots are not in favor of the option, as Turkey has been considered untrustworthy since the 1970s. Following a statement from the president of the Turkish Republic of Northern Cyprus, Dervis Eroglu, saying Cyprus was committed to a Cypriot-Turkish pipeline construction, Greek Cypriots in the Republic of Cyprus reacted with demands for presidential abdication. Additionally, Turkey has had numerous incursions in Cyprus’ EEZ and placed a vessel a block away from Italy's EEZ, making the trust between Mediterranean countries lower.

On 19 May 2023, Claudio Descalzi, the CEO of Italian energy company Eni, said that any agreement for the construction of the EastMed pipeline must include Turkey; he added that "there are disputes between Turkey and Cyprus that are difficult to remedy, furthermore Turkey has made an agreement with Libya to define a very vast platform that covers almost the entire EastMed, therefore not only Turkey but also Libya will have a say." In response to these comments, George Papanastasiou, the Cypriot Minister of Energy, Commerce and Industry, stated that not all people agree with the opinions expressed by Descalzi, and that he respects his opinion. These remarks follow reports that Eni, Cyprus and Israel are working on a deal for constructing a natural gas pipeline in the Eastern Mediterranean, connecting both the Cypriot and Israeli offshore gas fields to a processing plant in Cyprus, where the gas will be liquefied for export by ship to Italy and the rest of Europe.

== Tripartite energy memorandum ==
On 8 August 2013, Greece, Israel, and Cyprus signed the tripartite energy memorandum of understanding after the completion of one year negotiation in Nicosia. Negotiations were held between the Energy and Water Resources Minister of Israel Silvan Shalom, the Cypriot minister of agriculture, natural resources and environment Nicos Kouyialis and the Cypriot minister of environment, energy and climate change George Lakkotrypis. The 2,000 megawatt EuroAsia Interconnector is planned to lift Cyprus and Israel out of energy isolation through cheaper electricity as supported by Lakkotrypis. Silvan Shalom announced that the agreement is "historic" and insisted that it demonstrated the powerful relations between the three countries adding that the electric conduit will become a cable and is going to export electricity to the European energy market.

The Greek Prime Minister Antonis Samaras proclaimed on 8 August 2013 that Israel has a special role to play in supplying Europe with energy resources and supported that it can become a key energy hub. His statement at the White House occurred a few hours after the signing of an 800 million euro agreement to lay the EuroAsia Interconnector to connect the three countries' power grids. The three democratic states are making a systematic effort to establish a system of mutually beneficial cooperation across a wide range of activities. This includes intelligence cooperation, joint military drills, and the use of UAVs and satellites. The projects are designed to serve own interests as well as Europe and the States.

== See also ==
- Aphrodite gas field
- Zohr field
- Leviathan gas field
- Tamar gas field
- Noble Energy
- Greece–Israel relations
- Cyprus–Israel relations
- Cyprus–Turkey maritime zones dispute
- Natural gas in Russia
- Russia–Ukraine gas disputes
- Lebanon-Cyprus maritime border agreement
