= Nayax =

Global fintech company

Nayax Ltd.
- Type: Public
- Traded as: Nasdaq:NYAX & TASE:NYAX
- Industry: Fintech
- Founded: 2005; 21 years ago
- Founders: Yair Nechmad & David Ben-Avi
- Headquarters: Hunt Valley, Maryland (worldwide headquarters); Herzliya, Israel (R&D) (subsidiary offices: US; Canada; UK; Japan; Australia; Germany; China; Mexico; Netherlands)
- Products: VPOS Touch, Onyx, VPOS Fusion, VPOS, AMIT, MoMa, Monyx Wallet
- Number of employees: 1,100
- Website: www.nayax.com

Nayax Ltd. is an Israeli fintech company that offers cashless, telemetry, management, monitoring, and business intelligence (BI) products and services for the vending, unattended, and other retail industries.

Nayax’s main products are point of sale (POS) devices that accept swipe, contact and contactless card payments as well as mobile near-field communication NFC payments.

== Overview ==
Nayax was founded in 2005 in Tel Aviv by Yair Nechmad (CEO) and David Ben Avi (CTO). Headquartered in Herzliya, Israel. Nayax has registered offices in over 8 countries: the United States, the United Kingdom, Germany, Japan, China, Australia, and New Zealand.

In 2015, Nayax shipped 43,000 POS Terminals, ranking 36 in The Nilson Report's 2016 yearly survey.

In July 2018, Nayax was issued a Payment Institution license by the Board of the Bank of Lithuania. Nayax was also awarded the Mastercard European Issuer License in 2022.

At the time of its founding, Nayax focused on providing solutions to vending and other unattended businesses. However, it has expanded into new sectors such as EV charging stations with EV Meter, payment apps with its launch of Monyx Wallet in 2020, retail marketing with its acquisition of Weezmo in 2021, and financial solutions with its launching of Coinbridge in 2022.

Nayax completed the largest-ever Initial Public Offering (IPO) by a tech company on the Tel Aviv Stock Exchange (TASE) at 2021.

In 2022, it was dually listed in the Nasdaq Stock Exchange traded under NYAX.

== Awards ==
In 2015, Nayax shipped 43,000 POS Terminals, ranking 36 in The Nilson Report’s 2016 yearly survey.

In August 2016, Nayax’s product VPOS was awarded Best Payment System in the UK 2016 Vendies by Vending International.

In May 2017, Nayax received the Best Concept award at the Vending Star awards held at the u’vend and coffeena Exhibition in Cologne, Germany.

In June 2017, Nayax again won the Vendies by Vending International Award for Best Payment System of the Year in the UK for its VPOS device.

In November 2017, Nayax’s VPOS Touch won Best Payment System of the Year at EVEX 2017.

In October 2018, Nayax received the Vendies Award by Vending International for the Best Payment System of the Year in the UK, this time for its VPOS Touch device.

In November 2018, Nayax won the Best Payment System of the Year Prize for the Onyx device at EVEX 2018.

In April 2021, Nayax won the Best Payment System of the Year Prize for the VPOS Touch device at the Vendies.

In 2022, Nayax won the Self-Service Innovation Award for Best COVID-19 Solution for Monyx Wallet.

== Acquisitions, Expansion, and IPO ==
In April 2014, Nayax purchased InOne Technologies LLC, based in Maryland, currently operating as the US subsidiary of Nayax Ltd., now known as Nayax LLC. In July 2016, Nayax acquired VendSys In August 2016, Nayax's product VPOS was awarded Best Payment System in the UK 2016 Vendies by Vending International. In December 2016, SafeCharge International Group Ltd. (LON:SCH) completed a minority investment in Nayax.

In July 2016, Nayax acquired Vendsys.

In December 2016, SafeCharge International Group Ltd. (LON:SCH) completed a minority investment in Nayax.

In early 2017, Nayax acquired VendCheck which became the company’s Australian subsidiary, Nayax Australia.

In 2020, Nayax purchased Modularity, a digital payments startup based in Tel Aviv.

In 2021, Nayax purchased Weezmo, an Israeli tech start up.

In 2021, Nayax went public on the Tel Aviv Stock Exchange (TASE) with the largest ever IPO in the history of the TASE high tech sector. The fintech company raised $210 million at a company valuation of $1 billion with 75% of the money raised from foreign investors. US investment bank Jefferies led the IPO together with local partners Oppenheiner and Leader Capital Markets.

In 2021, Nayax also partnered with Tigapo which provides solutions for amusement locations.

In 2022, Nayax purchased On Track Innovations (OTI).

In 2022, Nayax also went public on the Nasdaq Stock Market.

In 2022, Nayax was awarded a Mastercard European Issuer Licence.

In 2022, Nayax launched CoinBridge, a financial solution that converts virtual assets into currency.

In 2023, Nayax partnered with Düzey, part of Koç Holding.

In 2023, Nayax acquired Retail Pro International (“Retail Pro”), a global leader in retail Point of Sale (“POS”) software with Tier 1 global brand names across the world.

== Product Info ==
2017 – Nayax introduced a self-checkout kiosk, the PayMarket Kiosk, to its line of products.

2019 – Nayax launches VPOS Fusion.

2022 – Nayax launches Coinbridge.

2022 – Nayax launches Nayax Capital.
