= TA-35 Index =

Israeli stock market index

TA-35
- Operator: TASE
- Exchanges: TASE
- Constituents: 35
- Market cap: ₪ 1,243,492 millions (as of 25 February 2026)
- Related indices: TA-90 Index; TA-125 Index
- Website: tase.co.il
- ISIN: IL00BIDX1428

TA-35 Index is an Israeli stock market index computed by the Tel Aviv Stock Exchange tracking the performance of 35 large companies listed on stock exchanges in Israel.

It is one of the most commonly followed equity indices in Israel, considered as the flagship index in Israel and as a proxy to the Israeli economy similarly to the S&P 500 in the USA.

TA-25 was launched in January 1992, with a value of 100 points as a base value.

The index was expanded on February 12, 2017, to include 35 instead of 25 stocks, in an attempt to improve stability and therefore reduce risk for trackers and encourage foreign investment.

== Composition ==
The components of the index are:

TA-35 Components
Country	Corporation	Ticker	Industry
Israel	OPC Energy Ltd	OPCE	Energy
USA	Ormat Technologies	ORA	Renewable Energy
Israel	ICL Group Ltd.	ICL	Chemicals
Israel	Elbit Systems	ESLT	Defense
Israel	AMOT investments	AMOT	Real Estate
Israel	Enlight Renewable Energy	ENLT	Renewable Energy
Israel	Bezeq	BEZQ	Telecommunications
Israel	BIG Shopping Centers	BIG	Real Estate
Israel	First International Bank of Israel	FIBI	Banking
Israel	Israel Discount Bank	DSCT	Banking
Israel	Delek Group	DLEKG	Oil & Gas
Israel	Dimri Construction	DIMRI	Real Estate
Israel	Phoenix Holdings Ltd.	PHOE	Insurance
Israel	Harel Insurance	HARL	Insurance
Israel	Tower Semiconductor	TSEM	Semiconductors
Israel	Teva Pharmaceutical Industries	TEVA	Pharma
Israel	Clal Insurance Holdings	CLIS	Insurance
Israel	Bank Leumi	LUMI	Banking
Israel	Mivne Real Estate Ltd	MVNE	Real Estate
Israel	Migdal Insurance	MGDL	Insurance
Israel	Mizrahi-Tefahot Bank	MZTF	Banking
Israel	Melisron	MLSR	Real Estate
Israel	Menora Mivtachim	MMHD	Insurance
Israel	Navitas Petroleum	NVPT	Oil & Gas
Israel	Nova Measuring Instruments	NVMI	Semiconductors
Israel	NewMed Energy	NWMD	Oil & Gas
Israel	NICE Ltd.	NICE	Technology
Israel	NextVision	NXSN	Defense
Israel	Azrieli Group	AZRG	Real Estate
Israel	Bank Hapoalim	POLI	Banking
Israel	Fattal Holdings	FTAL	Hotels & Tourism
Israel	Camtek Ltd.	CAMT	Semiconductors
Israel	Shufersal	SAE	Retail
Israel	Strauss Group	STRS	Food Processing
Israel	Shapir Engineering Industry	SPEN	Construction

== Historic values and returns ==
Date	Year	Index Points	Yearly Return	CAGR 5 Years	CAGR 10 Years	CAGR 15 Years
03/01/2000		487.23				
31/12/2000	2000	506.05	3.9%			
31/12/2001	2001	459.26	-9.2%			
31/12/2002	2002	333.91	-27.3%			
31/12/2003	2003	504.15	51.0%			
30/12/2004	2004	617.94	22.6%	4.9%		
29/12/2005	2005	823.42	33.3%	10.2%		
31/12/2006	2006	926.30	12.5%	15.1%		
31/12/2007	2007	1217.07	31.4%	29.5%		
31/12/2008	2008	654.85	-46.2%	5.4%		
31/12/2009	2009	1145.06	74.9%	13.1%	8.9%	
30/12/2010	2010	1326.44	15.8%	10.0%	10.1%	
29/12/2011	2011	1085.59	-18.2%	3.2%	9.0%	
31/12/2012	2012	1185.6	9.2%	-0.5%	13.5%	
31/12/2013	2013	1329.39	12.1%	15.2%	10.2%	
31/12/2014	2014	1464.99	10.2%	5.1%	9.0%	7.6%
31/12/2015	2015	1528.74	4.4%	2.9%	6.4%	7.6%
29/12/2016	2016	1470.78	-3.8%	6.3%	4.7%	8.1%
31/12/2017	2017	1509.78	2.7%	5.0%	2.2%	10.6%
31/12/2018	2018	1463.87	-3.0%	1.9%	8.4%	7.4%
31/12/2019	2019	1683.29	14.9%	2.8%	3.9%	6.9%
31/12/2020	2020	1499.05	-10.9%	-0.4%	1.2%	4.1%
30/12/2021	2021	1978.06	31.9%	6.1%	6.2%	5.2%
29/12/2022	2022	1796.92	-9.16%	3.54%	4.25%	2.63%
31/12/2023	2023	1865.31	3.81%	4.97%	3.45%	7.23%
31/12/2024	2024	2394.96	28.39%	7.31%	5.04%	5.04%
31/12/2025	2025	3631.55	51.63%	19.36%	9.04%	6.95%
CAGR			8.37%			
Cumulative Return			645.35%			

== See also ==
- TA-90 Index
- TA-125 Index
- Economy of Israel
