= Plasson =

Plasson Industries Ltd.
- Type: Public company
- Traded as: TASE: PLSN
- Industry: Plastics
- Founded: 1964; 62 years ago
- Headquarters: Maagan Michael
- Products: Plastic pipeworks, Pipe Fittings, Poultry farming systems
- Revenue: ▲ ₪ 975.06 million (2011)
- Operating income: ▲ ₪ 139.13 million (2011)
- Net income: ▲ ₪ 100,62 million (2011)
- Number of employees: 750
- Subsidiaries: Plasson Poultry
- Website: www.plasson.com

Plasson Industries Ltd. is a global manufacturer of plastic fittings for plastic pipes used in water distribution systems, gas conveyance systems, industrial fluid transfer and wastewater systems, and mines. Additionally, its division 'Plasson Poultry' is a leading manufacturer of systems for Poultry farming. The company’s shares are traded on the Tel Aviv Stock Exchange and are included in the TA-100 Index.

== History ==
Plasson was founded in 1964, by the members of the Maagan Michael Kibbutz, a collective community located 30 km south of Haifa, Israel, on the Mediterranean Sea coast. Realizing that farming was becoming more dependent on technology, Plasson developed transportation cages and drinkers for poultry and later, a range of fittings for plastic pipes now used in agriculture, industry, mines, sewage, municipal water systems, gas conveyance and telecommunications.

The driving force behind the founding of Plasson was Itzik Kantor, who brought in injection molding machines for the production of plastic products, initially household items such as buckets and waste bins. One of its original patents was the dual flush toilet, a plastic toilet tank which could be emptied using two different quantities of water.

The company’s headquarters and one of its manufacturing plants is still located at Maagan Michael, an additional production plant is located at Kabri in the north of Israel.

In 1996, Plasson had an initial public offering (IPO) and listed its shares on the Tel Aviv Stock Exchange. Proceeds from the IPO were used to expend its operations globally, acquiring or establishing manufacturing plants in Germany, Italy, United States and India. Additionally, the company opened sales and marketing offices in the United Kingdom, Brazil, Australia and Spain.

Over the years, Plasson has been investing heavily in research and development activities, registering dozen of patents, which has given the company a competitive advantage in international markets.

== See also ==
- Economy of Israel
- Israeli inventions and discoveries
