= TA-125 Index =

Israeli stock market index

The TA-125 Index, typically referred to as the Tel Aviv 125 and formerly the TA-100 Index, is a stock market index of the 125 most highly capitalised companies listed on the Tel Aviv Stock Exchange (TASE). The index began on 1 January 1992 with a base level of 100. The highest value reached to date is 2152.16, in January 2022. On 12 February 2017, the index was expanded to include 125 instead of 100 stocks, in an attempt to improve stability and therefore reduce risk for trackers and encourage foreign investment.

== Overview ==
The index is maintained by the Tel Aviv Stock Exchange and is calculated in real-time during trading hours and published every 30 seconds. The index combines the companies that are listed in the TA-35 and TA-90 indices.

=== TA-35 index ===
The TA-35 Index is the TASE's flagship index. It was first published in 1992 under the name "MA'OF Index". The TA-35 index tracks the prices of the shares of the 35 companies with the highest market capitalization on the exchange. It serves as an underlying asset for options and futures, Index-Linked Certificates and Reverse Certificates traded on the exchange and worldwide. The index also began on 1 January 1992 with a base level of 100, and expanded from 25 to 35 stocks together with the TA-125 in February 2017.

=== TA-90 index ===
The TA-90 is a share index of the 90 most highly capitalised companies listed on the Tel Aviv Stock Exchange, which are not included in the TA-35 index. The index began in 1999 with a base level of 100. The index was expanded on 12 February 2017 to include 90 instead of 75 stocks, in an attempt to improve stability and therefore reduce risk for trackers and encourage foreign investment.

== Weighting ==
Since February 2008, the TA-125 is calculated using a free float method, the total market capitalization of the companies weighted by their effect on the index, so the larger stocks would make more of a difference to the index as compared to a smaller market cap company. The basic formula for any index is (be it capitalization weighted or any other stock index).

- Index level= Σ(Price of stock* Number of shares)*Free float factor/ Index Divisor.

The Free float Adjustment factor represents the proportion of shares that is floated as a percentage of issued shares. The free-float method, therefore, does not include restricted stocks, such as those held by company insiders.

A company's weight in the index has an upper-limit of 9.8%, the weight of a company that should be higher is limited to 9.8% and the rest is divided between the other constituents of the index. Since October 2007 this restriction has set the effective weight of Teva Pharmaceutical Industries at 9.8%.

To be included in the TA-35 index the company's stock also need to adhere to the following requirement: Meet a public holding threshold of at least 25% and a minimal value of 600 million NIS (to ensure that there is a significant Free float holding, which is not controlled by insiders).

The constituents of the indices are determined twice a year; on the first trading day in January and in July. The largest companies in the TA-125 index are promoted to the TA-35 index if their market capitalisation is 20% more than a current company.

== Annual Returns ==
The following table shows the annual development of the TA-125 Index since 1993.

Year	Closing level	Change in index in points	Change in index in %
1993	247.67		
1994	173.57	−74.10	−29.92
1995	208.23	34.66	19.97
1996	211.04	2.81	1.35
1997	290.96	79.92	37.87
1998	299.89	8.93	3.07
1999	487.23	187.34	62.47
2000	494.58	7.35	1.51
2001	446.79	−47.79	−9.66
2002	332.45	−114.34	−25.59
2003	534.39	201.94	60.74
2004	635.95	101.56	19.00
2005	822.99	187.04	29.41
2006	925.60	102.61	12.47
2007	1,154.59	228.99	24.74
2008	564.09	−590.50	−51.14
2009	1,066.73	502.64	89.11
2010	1,223.16	156.43	14.66
2011	978.49	−244.67	−20.00
2012	1,049.06	70.57	7.21
2013	1,207.69	158.63	15.12
2014	1,288.93	81.24	6.73
2015	1,315.08	26.15	2.03
2016	1,282.37	−32.71	−2.49
2017	1,366.22	83.85	6.54
2018	1,333.18	−33.04	−2.42
2019	1,616.70	283.52	21.27
2020	1,568.09	−48.61	−3.01
2021	2,056.51	488.42	31.15
2022	1,813.35	−243.16	−11.82
2023	1,887.08	73.73	4.07
2024	2,426.83	539.75	28.6
2025	3,654.94	1,228.11	50.61

== Constituents ==
TA-125 Index Components (as of 23 August 2020):

Name	Symbol	Market Cap (NIS millions)	Weight (%)	Sector	Comments
Avgol Industries 1953 Ltd.	AVGL	1,135	0.11	Industry - Wood & Paper	Manufactures nonwoven fabric products.
Adgar Investment & Development Ltd.	ADGR	651	0.11	Real-Estate & Construction	
AFI Properties Ltd.	AFPR	2,809	0.46	Real-Estate & Construction	
Africa Israel Residences Ltd.	AFRE	1,259	0.16	Construction	
Airport City Ltd.	ARPT	4,970	0.85	Real-Estate & Construction	
Allot Ltd.	ALLT	1,312	0.36	Internet And Software	
Alony Hetz Properties & Investments Ltd.	ALHE	6,440	1.80	Real-Estate & Construction	
Altshuler Shaham Provident Funds and Pension Ltd.	ASPF	3,362	0.23	Financial Services	
Amot Investments Ltd.	AMOT	6,256	0.79	Real-Estate & Construction	
Arad Investment & Industrial Development Ltd.	ARAD	1,910	0.24	Electronics & Optics	
Arad Ltd.	ARD	1,145	0.14	Electronics And Optics	
Arko Holdings Ltd.	ARKO	1,587	0.20	Energy	
Ashtrom Group Ltd.	ASHG	3,376	0.33	Construction	
Ashtrom Properties Ltd.	ASPR	1,135	0.11	Real-Estate & Construction	
Atreyu Capital Markets Ltd.	ATRY	838	0.14	Financial Services	
Audiocodes Ltd.	AUDC	3,909	0.87	Communications Equipment	
Augwind Energy Tech Storage Ltd.	AUGN	2,050	0.23	Cleantech	
Azorim-Investment, Development & Construction Co. Ltd.	AZRM	1,289	0.16	Construction	
Azrieli Group Ltd.	AZRG	21,865	2.14	Real-Estate & Construction	
Bank Hapoalim Ltd.	POLI	26,745	4.80	Banks	London Stock Exchange dual-listed company.
Bank Leumi Ltd.	LUMI	24,031	4.50	Banks	
BATM Advanced Communications Ltd.	BVC	2,355	0.53	Investment in hi-tech	
Bayside Land Corporation Ltd.	BYSD	4,251	0.95	Real-Estate & Construction	
Bazan Oil Refineries Ltd.	ORL	2,100	0.35	Energy	
Bezeq The Israeli Telecommunication Corp. Ltd.	BEZQ	9,873	2.21	Communications & Media	
Big Shopping Centers Ltd.	BIG	3,942	0.50	Real-Estate & Construction	
Blue Square Real Estate Ltd.	BLSR	1,763	0.22	Real-Estate & Construction	
Brack Capital Properties N.V	BCNV	1,949	0.19	Real-Estate & Construction	
Camtek Ltd.	CAMT	2,094	0.35	Semiconductors	
Carasso Motors Ltd.	CRSO	916	0.09	Services - Commerce	
Cellcom Israel Ltd.	CEL	1,911	0.32	Communications & Media	NYSE dual-listed company.
Clal Insurance Enterprises Holdings Ltd.	CLIS	2,213	0.62	Insurance	
Compugen Ltd.	CGEN	5,107	1.37	Biomed	NASDAQ dual-listed company.
Danel (Adir Yeoshua) Ltd.	DANE	2,173	0.61	Services	
Delek Automotive Systems Ltd.	DLEA	1,481	0.25	Services - Commerce	22.5% ownership by Delek Group.
Delek Drilling LP	DEDR.L	4,433	0.56	Energy	59.1% ownership by Delek Group.
Delek Group Ltd.	DLEKG	1,140	0.12	Investment & Holdings	
Delta-Galil Industries Ltd.	DELT	1,081	0.14	Fashion & Clothing	
Doral Group Renewable Energy Resources Ltd.	DORL	1,417	0.08	Cleantech	
Elbit Systems Ltd.	ESLT	20,141	3.38	Defense	NASDAQ dual-listed company.
Elco Ltd.	ELCO	3,502	0.34	Investment & Holdings	
Elecreaon Wireless Ltd.	ELWS	1,972	0.25	Cleantech	
Electra Consumer Products Ltd.	ECP	1,952	0.25	Services - Commerce	
Electra Ltd.	ELTR	5,898	0.99	Investment & Holdings	
Electra Real Estate Ltd.	ELCRE	893	0.11	Real-Estate & Construction	
Ellomay	ELLO	1,114	0.14	Cleantech	Builds & operates renewable energy & power projects.
Energean Oil & Gas Plc.	ENOG	4,472	0.75	Energy	
Energix-Renewable Energies Ltd.	ENRG	7,146	0.90	Cleantech	
Enlight Renewable Energy Ltd.	ENLT	4,774	1.33	Cleantech	
Equital Ltd.	EQTL	2,310	0.39	Investment & Holdings	
F.I.B.I. Holdings Ltd.	FIBIH	3,089	0.52	Banks	Controls "The First International Bank".
Fattal Holdings Ltd.	FTAL	2,976	0.37	Hotels & Tourism	
First International Bank Of Israel Ltd.	FIBI	7,718	1.29	Banks	
FMS Enterprises Migun Ltd.	FBRT	812	0.08	Fashion & Clothing	Producer of ballistic protection materials.
Formula Systems Ltd.	FORTY	4,971	1.11	IT Services	
Fox-Wizel Ltd.	FOX	2,007	0.34	Fashion & Clothing	
Fresh Market Ltd.	FRSM	2,169	0.21	Services - Commerce	
Gazit Globe Ltd.	GZT	2,362	0.23	Real-Estate & Construction	
Gilat Satellite Networks Ltd.	GILT	1,043	0.00	Communications Equipment	
Hadera Paper Ltd.	HAP	656	0.08	Wood & Paper	
Ham-Let (Israel-Canada) Ltd.	HAML	760	0.17	Metal & Building Products	
Harel Insurance, Investments & Financial Services Ltd.	HARL	4,763	0.80	Insurance	
Hilan Ltd.	HLAN	3,586	0.80	IT Services	
Idi Insur Ltd.	IDIN	1,259	0.21	Insurance	
IES Holdings Ltd.	IES	859	0.11	Investment & Holdings	
Ilex Medical Ltd.	ILX	1,304	0.13	Commerce	
Inrom Construction Industries Ltd.	INRM	1,359	0.38	Metal & Building Products	
International Flavors & Fragrances Inc.	IFF	43,692	2.65	Food	NYSE dual-listed company.
Isracard Ltd.	ISCD	1,846	0.52	Financial Services	
Israel Canada Ltd.	ISCN	1,073	0.13	Construction	
Israel Chemicals Ltd.	ICL	16,353	2.74	Chemical, Rubber & Plastic	45% owned by Israel Corporation.
The Israel Corporation Ltd.	ILCO	3,118	0.52	Investment & Holdings	Holds "Israel Chemicals" and "Bazan Oil Refineries".
Israel Discount Bank Ltd.	DSCT	12,117	3.39	Banks	
The Israel Land Development Co. Ltd.	ILDC	828	0.10	Real-Estate & Construction	
Isramco Negev 2 LP	ISRA.L	1,650	0.37	Energy	
Isras Investment Company Ltd.	ISRS	2,633	0.18	Real-Estate & Construction	
Itamar Medical Ltd.	ITMR	944	0.21	Medical Equipment	Development & commercialization of non-invasive medical devices.
Kamada Ltd.	KMDA	1,480	0.33	Biomed	
Kenon Holdings Ltd.	KEN	3,555	0.45	Investment & Holdings	Holds "Zim Integrated Shipping Services", automotive & energy companies.
Kerur Holdings Ltd.	KRUR	1,229	0.15	Food	
Levinstein Properties Ltd.	LVPR	870	0.09	Real-Estate & Construction	
Liveperson Inc.	LPSN	13,898	2.64	Internet And Software	
M. Yochananof and Sons Ltd.	YHNF	2,188	0.12	Services - Commerce	
Magic Software Enterprises Ltd.	MGIC	2,742	0.46	Internet And Software	
Malam Team Ltd.	MLTM	1,428	0.14	IT Services	
Matrix IT Ltd.	MTRX	5,777	0.97	IT Services	
Maytronics Ltd.	MTRN	5,407	0.68	Electronics And Optics	
Mediterranean Towers Ltd.	MDTR	1,070	0.18	Real-Estate & Construction	
Mega Or Holdings Ltd.	MGOR	2,863	0.64	Real-Estate & Construction	
Meitav Dash Investments Ltd	MTDS	791	0.10	Financial Services	
Melisron Ltd.	MLSR	5,954	0.75	Real-Estate & Construction	
Menora Mivtachim Holdings Ltd.	MMHD	2,558	0.32	Insurance	
Migdal Insurance & Financial Holdings Ltd.	MGDL	2,743	0.27	Insurance	
Mivne Real Estate	MVNE	5,468	1.22	Real-Estate & Construction	
Mizrahi Tefahot Bank Ltd.	MZTF	16,606	2.78	Banks	
Naphtha Israel Petroleum Corp. Ltd.	NFTA	1,298	0.13	Energy	
Neto Malinda Trading Ltd.	NTML	1,315	0.22	Services - Commerce	
NICE Ltd.	NICE	47,143	5.40	Internet And Software	NASDAQ dual-listed company.
Nova Measuring Instruments Ltd.	NVMI	5,222	1.45	Semiconductors	
Novolog	NVLG	1,415	0.24	Services	Logistics of pharmaceuticals & healthcare.
One Software Technologies Ltd.	ONE	1,815	0.30	IT Services	
OPC Energy Ltd.	OPCE	3,902	0.38	Energy	
OPKO Health, Inc.	OPK	11,407	1.77	Biomed	NASDAQ dual-listed company.
Ormat Technologies Inc.	ORA	10,642	1.68	Cleantech	Majority owned subsidiary Ormat Technologies listed under ORA on NYSE.
Partner Communications Company Ltd.	PTNR	2,532	0.57	Communications & Media	NASDAQ dual-listed company.
Paz Oil Company Ltd.	PZOL	3,122	0.88	Energy	
Perrigo Ltd.	PRGO	24,516	4.37	Biomed	NYSE dual-listed company.
The Phoenix Holdings Ltd.	PHOE	3,942	0.66	Insurance	
Plasson Industries Ltd.	PLSN	1,261	0.12	Chemical, Rubber & Plastic	
Rami Levi Chain Stores Hashikma Marketing Ltd.	RMLI	2,874	0.48	Commerce	
Ratio Oil Exploration LP	RATI.L	1,273	0.28	Energy	
Reit 1 Ltd.	RIT1	2,353	0.66	Real-Estate & Construction	
Sapiens International Corporation N.V	SPNS	5,778	0.97	Internet And Software	
Sella Capital Real Estate Ltd	SLARL	1,115	0.31	Real-Estate & Construction	
Shapir Engineering And Industry Ltd.	SPEN	8,081	1.02	Metal & Building Products	
Shikun & Binui Ltd.	SKBN	6,108	1.02	Construction	
Shufersal Ltd.	SAE	6,182	1.38	Commerce	
Strauss Group Ltd.	STRS	11,335	1.42	Food	
Summit Real Estate Holdings Ltd.	SMT	2,240	0.38	Real-Estate & Construction	
Tadiran Holdings Ltd.	TDRN	1,669	0.16	Services - Commerce	
Tel Aviv Stock Exchange Ltd.	TASE	1,543	0.43	Financial Services	
Teva Pharmaceutical Industries Ltd.	TEVA	37,092	3.89	Biomed	NYSE dual-listed company.
Tower Semiconductor Ltd.	TSEM	7,207	2.01	Semiconductors	
Victory Supermarket Chain Ltd.	VCTR	1,213	0.15	Services - Commerce	
Vitania Ltd.	VTNA	728	0.09	Real-Estate & Construction	
Y.H.Dimri Building & Development Ltd.	DIMRI	1,873	0.24	Construction	

== Former members of the index ==
- 012 Smile Communications - Acquired by Partner in 2010.
- VeriFone Holdings - Delisted from TASE in 2010, later turned private.
- British Israel Investments - Formerly known as Azorim Properties, bought out by Melisron in 2011.
- MA Industries (Makhteshim Agan) - Acquired by ChemChina in 2011.
- NetVision - Merged into Cellcom in 2011.
- Granite Hacarmel Investments - Acquired by Azrieli Group in 2012.
- HOT Telecommunication Systems - Acquired by Altice in 2012.
- Clal Industries and Investments - Acquired by Access Industries in 2013.
- Retalix - Acquired by NCR Corp. in 2013.
- Alvarion - Trading suspended in 2014, delisted in 2016.
- Given Imaging - Acquired by Covidien in 2014.
- Koor Industries - Acquired by ChemChina in 2014.
- Nitsba Holdings - Merged into Airport City in 2015.
- Blue Square-Israel - Acquired by Moti Ben-Moshe in 2016.
- EZchip Semiconductor - Merged into Mellanox in 2016.
- Ituran Location and Control - Delisted from TASE in 2016, traded at NASDAQ.
- Osem - Acquired by Nestlé in 2016.
- Ceragon Networks - Delisted from TASE in 2017, traded at NASDAQ.
- Africa Israel Investments - Acquired by Moti Ben-Moshe in 2018.
- Frutarom Industries - Acquired by IFF in 2018.
- Mellanox Technologies - Acquired by NVIDIA in 2019.
- Alrov Properties & Lodgings - Removed from the index in August 2019.
- B Communications - Removed from the index in August 2019.
- N.R. Spuntech Industries - Removed from the index in August 2019.
- Jerusalem Economy - Merged with Industrial Building Corporation (also a TA-125 constituent) in November 2019.
- Municipal Bank Ltd - Merged into Mercantile Discount Bank as a private company and delisted from TASE in December 2019.
- Redhill Biopharma Ltd. - Delisted from TASE in January 2020, trading at NASDAQ.
- Agis Industries – Acquired by Perrigo (now known as Perrigo Israel Pharmaceuticals).
- Avner Oil Exploration - Merged into Delek Drilling.
- Delek Israel Fuel Corp. - Merged into Delek Group.
- Discount Investment Corporation - Removed from the index due to decrease in free-floating shares.
- Elbit Imaging - Removed from the index due to decrease in capitalization.
- Elite – Merged with the Strauss Group.
- Kardan N.V. - Removed from the index due to decrease in capitalization.
- Ness Technologies - Split into several companies, later purchased by Hilan, IAI and Formula Systems.
- Ormat Industries - Merged into Ormat Technologies.
- Tamar Petroleum Ltd. - Removed from the index.

== Gender representation among top positions ==
As of 2023, research by "Calcalist" established a review on the state of gender representation among executive positions within the TA-125 listed companies. Out of 2,063 executive positions identified within these companies, 570 were held by women, 27.6% of the total positions. Specifically, women accounted for approximately 30.2% of positions within Board of Directors, a slight raise from the previous year's 27.8% figure. However, the percentage of women in general management has remained unchanged at approximately 24.8%.
