= Tamar gas field =

Israeli natural gas field in the Mediterranean

- Location of Tamar gas field offshore Israel
- Country: Israel
- Location: Levant basin Eastern Mediterranean Sea
- Block: Matan licence
- Offshore/onshore: Offshore
- Coordinates: 33°04′42″N 33°57′05″E
- Operator: Chevron
- Partners: Isramco (28.75%); Chevron (25%); Tamar Petroleum (16.75%); Aaron Frenkel (14.5%); Mubadala Investment (11%); Dor Gas Exploration (4%)
- Service contractors: Aker Solutions

Field history
- Discovery: January 2009
- Start of production: 30 March 2013

Production
- Current production of gas: 1,100×10^{6} cu ft/d (31×10^{6} m^{3}/d) 10.3×10^{9} m^{3}/a (360×10^{9} cu ft/a)
- Year of current production of gas: 2018
- Recoverable gas: 307×10^{9} m^{3} (10.8×10^{12} cu ft)
- Producing formations: Tamar sands

The Tamar gas field is a natural gas field in the Mediterranean Sea off the coast of Israel. The field is located in Israel's exclusive economic zone, roughly 80 kilometres (50 mi) west of Haifa in waters 1,700 metres (5,600 ft) deep. The Tamar field is considered to have proven reserves of 200 billion cubic metres (7.1 trillion cubic feet) of natural gas, while the adjoining Tamar South field has 23 billion cubic metres (810 billion cubic feet). Together, they may have an additional 84 BCM of "probable" reserves and up to 49 BCM of "possible" reserves (reserves having a 10% probability of extraction). At the time of discovery, Tamar was the largest find of gas or oil in the Levant basin of the Eastern Mediterranean Sea and the largest discovery by Noble Energy. Since Tamar's discovery, large gas discoveries have been made in other analogous geological formations dating back to the Oligocene–Miocene epoch in the Levant basin. Because Tamar was the first such discovery, these gas containing presalt formations have become collectively known as Tamar sands.

== History ==
In 1999, Israel's Oil Commissioner granted BG Group preliminary exploratory permits to deep-sea blocks that included the Tamar field. In December 2000, BG received an exploratory license, in a partnership that included three Israeli industrial companies, Mashav (15.6%, Dor Chemicals (7.2%), and Israel Petrochemical Enterprises (7.2%). In May 2001, Mashav left the partnership and BG brought in STX, Isramco, Clal Industries, and Granit-Sonol, the latter two leaving the partnership in 2004.

In December 2001, BG completed 3D seismic studies that indicated the potential of the Tamar field and of the adjoining Dalit field. BG recommended drilling an exploratory well at an estimated cost of $40 million.

In May 2002, the BG license was extended by the Oil Commissioner, on the condition that drilling begin no later than September 2003. In February 2003, the Commissioner extended the deadline to December 2004, and in December 2004 a further extension was given to June 2005. During this period, BG conducted negotiations for selling gas to the Israel Electric Company.

In April 2005, BG announced that it was abandoning its stake. According to some reports, BG quit after being unable to conclude an agreement to supply gas to the Israel Electric Company. (Israel in mid-2005 reached an agreement to receive gas from Egypt for US$2.75 per million British thermal units ($9.4/MWh), a price that BG stated it was not willing to match.) In May 2005, the Oil Commissioner extended the license to December 2006 and allowed the remaining partners, STX, Isramco, Dor Exploration, and Dor Chemicals to bring in the Delek-owned partnerships, Avner and Delek Drilling, on the condition that a contract for drilling be concluded by June 2006. (According to one source, Avner bought its stake from BG for one dollar).

Noble Energy joined as operator in 2006. In 2006, the license was extended to December 31, 2008, despite the failure to begin drilling, and despite the statutory seven-year limit on oil licenses set by Israel's Oil Law. Isramco reported in 2006 that exploratory drilling was expected to cost $69 million.

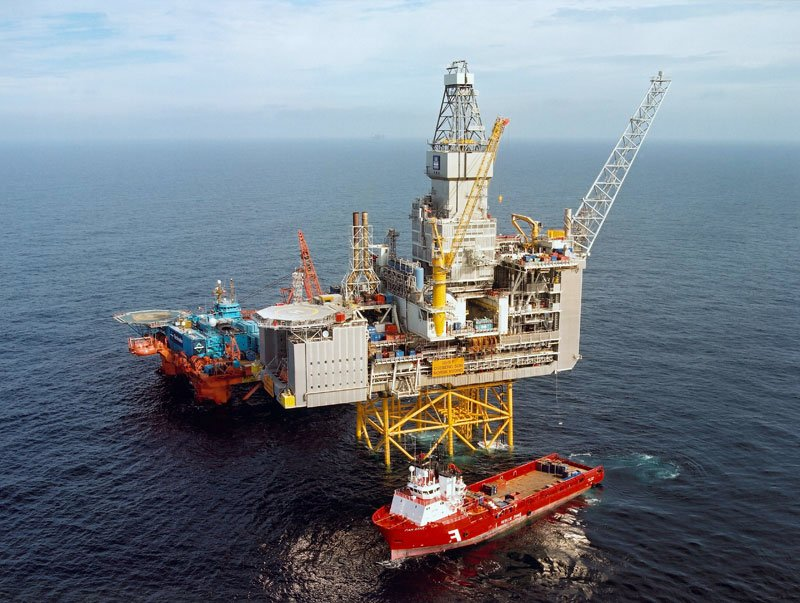
Gas field (illustration)

Drilling of Tamar 1 began in November 2008. At the time, seismic studies indicated that there was a 35% chance that the formation contained gas. The studies further indicated that if there was gas, the median estimate for the producible quantity was 107 BCM.

Tamar 1 was drilled to a depth of 4,900 metres (16,100 ft) at a cost of $92 million. The partners announced the discovery on January 17, 2009. On July 7, 2009, the partners announced a second successful appraisal drilling at Tamar 2, increasing the estimated reserves of the field by 26%. In mid-2011, four more appraisal wells were drilled, with additional gas found at Tamar 3. In September 2011, Noble began production development.

In September 2010, Noble announced that development of the Tamar field was beginning at an expected cost of $3 billion. In March 2012 the Tamar partners signed a 15-year, US$14 billion deal with the Israel Electric Corporation to supply it with 42 billion cubic meters (BCM) of natural gas, with an option to increase the gas purchases up to $23 billion. By March 2012, the consortium developing Tamar had signed deals worth up to a total of $32 billion with six Israeli companies, committing up to 133BCM. According to a study commissioned by the government, the prices set were significantly higher than the price that would be demanded under comparable circumstances elsewhere. In 2012, Tamar was found to be the largest air polluting plant in Israel.

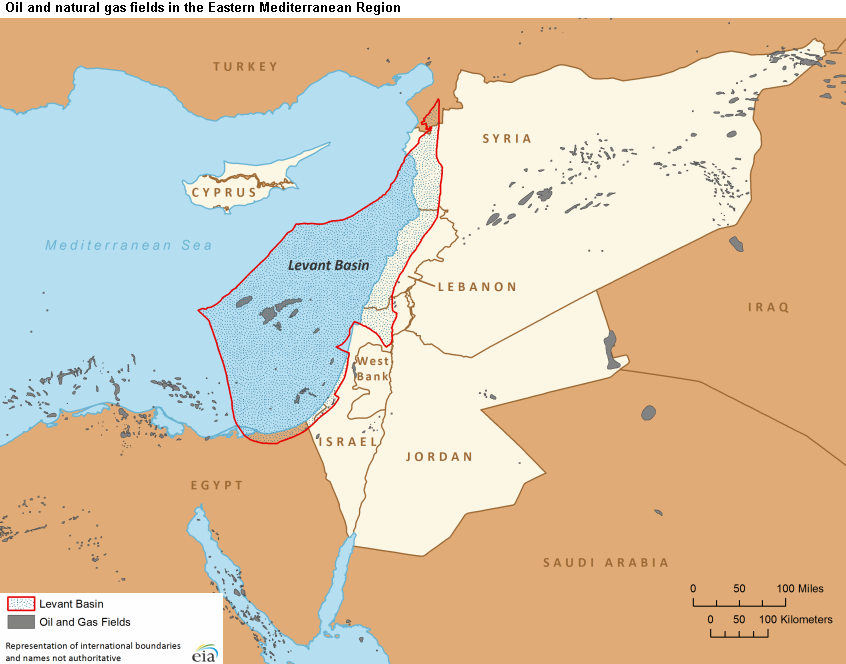
Known oil and gas fields in the Levant Basin (US EIA)

Due to Delek and Noble Energy's monopolistic position in the Israeli gas market as the owners of the Tamar, Leviathan, and Karish/Tanin fields, in 2016 the Israeli government ordered the companies to sell most of their stakes in the Tamar and Karish/Tanin fields. As a result, in January 2018, Tamar Petroleum acquired 7.5% of Noble Energy's holdings in the Tamar gas field, increasing its total holdings to 16.75%. In September 2021, Delek Drilling signed an agreement to sell the remainder of its holdings (22%) to the Abu Dhabi-based Mubadala Energy company for $1.05 billion.

About a year later, billionaire Aaron Frenkel, who was part of the acquisition deal made by Mubadala in 2021, exercised his option to purchase half of the shares (11% of the gas field) for $525 million. This deal also included all the cash flow from the gas field from early 2021 until the date set for the transfer of rights, valued at an additional $75 million.

In March 2024, Frenkel acquired an additional 3.5% of the Tamar gas field from Everest (a partnership between Harel Insurance and the Israel Infrastructure Fund) for approximately 970 million shekels ($272 million), reflecting a total gas field value of about 32 billion shekels (approx. $8.5 billion). With this purchase, Frenkel's direct holding in the Tamar gas field increased to about 14.5%. Additionally, he holds about 25% of Tamar Petroleum shares, which in turn owns 16.75% of the Tamar gas field, effectively adding an additional 4.2% to Frenkel's holdings.

The stakeholders in the Tamar gas field are Isramco (28.75%), Chevron (25%), Tamar Petroleum (16.75%), Aaron Frenkel (14.5%), Mubadala (11%), and Dor Gas (4%).

On 9 October 2023, production at the gas field was temporary suspended by the Israeli government following the outbreak of the Gaza war.

In June 2025, it was announced that SOCAR acquired a 10% stake in Tamar, which is worth an estimated $1.25 billion.

== Production ==
Production is carried out by eight wells connected by a 93 miles (150 km) long subsea double pipe tie-back to a gas processing platform located offshore Ashkelon. First commercial gas delivery took place on 1 April 2013 after three years of development work. Total initial delivery capacity was 985 million ft^{3} (27.9 million m^{3}) per day or 10 billion cubic metre annually. This was increased in 2015 to 1,100 million ft^{3} (31 million m^{3}) per day with the addition of compressors in the Ashdod reception terminal. In 2016, the reservoir produced 9.3 billion cubic metre of gas, a 12% increase over the previous year. In 2018, the output from the Tamar gas field yields more than 60% of Israel's electricity. In 2022, Tamar produced 10.25 billion cubic metres of gas.

== Pipeline connection controversy ==
On June 14, 2009, Shaul Tzemach, Director General of Israel's Energy and Water Resources Ministry, announced that the Ministry would rely on an analysis by Noble Energy to determine how pipelines from Tamar would connect to the national gas infrastructure. On September 22, Noble presented its analysis for connecting Tamar at a site on the Israeli coast, either adjacent to Moshav Ma'ayan Tzvi or 5 km farther north at Moshav Dor. Public controversy arose over the location of a plant to clean and process the gas from Tamar. Communities in the Carmel region brought a petition to Israel's High Court in March 2010, demanding that alternative sites be considered. In July 2010, the High Court issued an injunction that the Ministry explain its decision. In August, Uzi Landau, Minister of Energy and Water Resources, announced that the connection would be to Ashdod, a move that was expected to allow Noble to complete the project by the end of 2012, in line with the original deadline.

== Energy crisis and economic consequences ==
The crisis in Egypt which began in 2011 led to sabotage of the pipeline in Sinai which supplied natural gas to Israel from Egypt. This, as well as declining production from the Israel Yam Tethys field, reduced the gas supplies to the Israel Electric Corporation and other large users, who turned to much more expensive liquid fuels until Tamar development was completed. The direct economic costs alone to the Israeli economy of the energy crisis have been estimated at NIS 20 billion.

== Sheshinski Commission ==
Through 2009, Egypt increased the price of gas being sold to the Israel Electric Company, and the Israeli joint venture of Noble and Delek Energy, producing from the Yam Tethys field, followed suit. Higher prices enabled Yam Tethys profits for the third quarter of 2009 to reach new records, prompting several Knesset members to consider the need for revising the country's tax and royalty regime. On February 23, 2010, the Knesset Economics Committee held a session to discuss options for increasing taxes and royalties. During the session, committee member Carmel Shama stated that the government revenue from oil sales, as set in the Petroleum Law (1952), was relevant in an era when exploration risks were high and profits low, which was no longer the case in 2009. Gideon Tadmor, chairman of Delek Energy, claimed that changing the tax and royalty regime would freeze exploration and development.

On 12 April 2010, in response to the Knesset concerns, Israel's Treasury Minister Yuval Steinitz established a committee to consider the country's fiscal policy regarding its gas and oil resources. Eytan Sheshinski was appointed to head the committee. By the time the committee presented its findings in January, 2011, the Leviathan gas field had also been discovered.

The main recommendations of the committee included: 1) eliminating the tax allowance for "depreciation" of a field's value as its gas and oil was produced; 2) leaving the royalty rate unchanged at 12.5%; and 3) imposing a windfall profits levy, which would reach 50% of a producer's profits once the producer had recouped a certain percentage of his exploration and development costs. The windfall profits levy was incorporated into the Petroleum Profit Taxation Law, 5771–2011, which passed in March 2011. The law set the "recoup" percentage at 280% for the Tamar field and 200% for the Leviathan field and any field that would be developed later. State income from the windfall profits levy will be set aside in a sovereign wealth fund called the Israeli Citizens' Fund.

The owners of the Tamar and Leviathan licenses lobbied against the law, claiming that it represented a breach of contract and would scare off future investors in Israel; Uzi Landau, Minister of Energy, argued against applying the law to the Tamar field in particular, saying it would delay the field's development. Nevertheless, when Tamar production began on schedule in April 2013, both Landau and Noble CEO Charlie Davidson claimed that the project had been completed in record time.

== Monopoly position of Tamar partners ==
In January 2011, as the Knesset was debating the Profit Taxation Law, the Egyptian Revolution of 2011 began. Within weeks, the Egyptian-Israeli gas pipeline had been sabotaged, and in April the former Egyptian petroleum minister had been arrested for alleged corruption related to the sale of gas to Israel. The cessation of gas from Egypt meant that the Tamar project would come on-line as the sole gas supplier to Israel. By the end of 2011, the Tamar group had raised the price of gas in its contract with IEC, effectively restoring to the partners most or all of the profit that they had expected before the passage of the Profit Taxation Law.

In May 2011, Energy Minister Uzi Landau instructed the pricing commission of the ministry to evaluate regulating the price of gas. In May, 2012, the commission published its conclusion that gas should be a regulated commodity and that the commission would monitor contracts to determine whether prices were fair. A study sponsored by the commission showed that the Tamar partners annual after-tax returns could be expected to be 54% of assets, as opposed to the 19% annual return projected by the Sheshinski Committee. In February 2014, Knesset Member Shelly Yachimovich issued an open letter to the government, berating it for not setting fair gas prices that could reduce the country's cost of living.

== Langotsky claims ==
An early promoter of the project was Israeli oil geologist Joseph Langotsky, who named the Tamar and Dalit fields after his daughter and granddaughter. Langotsky had a small share of STX, a limited partnership that had a small share of the Tamar license from 2001 through 2008. The primary owner of STX was Israeli businessman Benny Steinmetz. Langotsky sued Steinmetz after the Tamar discovery in 2010, claiming that Steinmetz dropped out of the partnership two months before drilling began, causing Langotsky to lose his rights to the field. In July 2013 the court ruled in Langotsky's favor, ordering Steinmetz to pay Langotsky NIS 50 million (appx. US$14 million) in compensation.

== Maritime border with Lebanon ==
Following the discovery in 2009, some Lebanese leaders, particularly officials of the Lebanese Shi'a Islamist group Hezbollah made statements threatening Israel against developing the sites, and Israeli officials made counter threats against Lebanese intervention. In August 2010, the issue was largely resolved when Lebanon submitted to the United Nations its official view regarding the maritime border, indicating that it considered the Tamar and Leviathan gas fields to be outside Lebanese territory (though it indicated other prospective fields in the region may be within Lebanese territory). The US expressed support for Lebanon's proposal.

== Export plans ==
Delek Energy held talks on exporting natural gas from Tamar to Cyprus and to South Korea. Shipments to Asia would be by Liquified Natural Gas, for which a floating liquefied natural gas terminal would be built by Daewoo Shipbuilding & Marine Engineering, with Front-end engineering of the terminal to be done by Höegh LNG. In March, 2013, Israeli Minister of Energy, Uzi Landau issued a notice to the Tamar partners not to proceed with signing export contracts until it is granted permission to do so by the Israeli government.

== See also ==
- Energy Triangle
- Economy of Israel
- Sarah and Myra
- Leviathan gas field
- List of natural gas fields
- Natural gas in Israel
