= Leviathan gas field =

Israeli natural gas field in the Mediterranean

- Location of the Leviathan gas field in the Eastern Mediterranean
- Country: Israel
- Region: Eastern Mediterranean Sea
- Location: Levantine basin
- Blocks: Rachel & Amit
- Offshore/onshore: Offshore
- Coordinates: 33°10′04″N 33°37′02″E
- Operator: Chevron Corporation
- Partners: Delek Drilling (45.33%); Ratio Oil Exploration (15%); Chevron Corporation (39.66%)

Field history
- Discovery: December 2010
- Start of production: 31 December 2019

Production
- Estimated gas in place: 35,000×10^{9} cu ft (990×10^{9} m^{3})
- Recoverable gas: 22,000×10^{9} cu ft (620×10^{9} m^{3})
- Producing formations: Tamar sands

The Leviathan gas field is a large natural gas field in the Mediterranean Sea off the coast of Israel, 47 kilometres (29 mi) south-west of the Tamar gas field. The gas field is roughly 130 kilometres (81 mi) west of Haifa in waters 1,500 metres (4,900 ft) deep in the Levantine basin, a rich hydrocarbon area in one of the largest offshore natural gas field finds. According to some commentators, the gas find has the potential to change Israel's foreign relations with neighboring countries, including Turkey, and Egypt. Together with the nearby Tamar gas field, the Leviathan field was seen as an opportunity for Israel to achieve energy independence in the Middle East.

In 2017, Leviathan was estimated to hold enough gas to meet Israel's domestic needs for 40 years, having 22 trillion cubic feet of recoverable natural gas. The field began commercial production of gas on 31 December 2019. As of 2024, 90% of the field's production was being exported to Egypt and Jordan.

== History ==
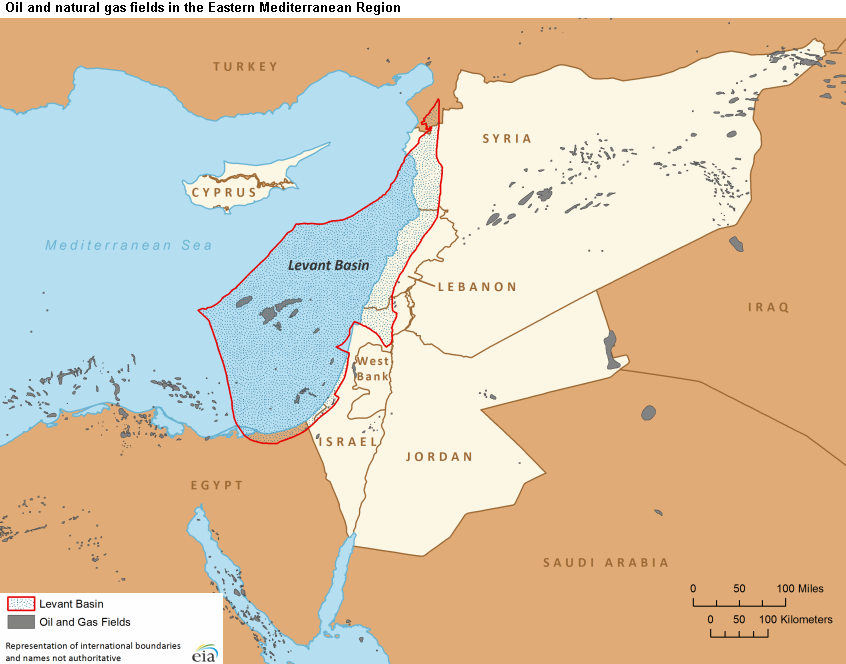
Boundaries of the Levant Basin, or Levantine Basin (US EIA)

The potential for a natural gas prospect at the Leviathan site was identified by geologist Eitan Aizenberg, co-founder of the small Israeli oil exploration company Ratio. To assist with exploring the prospect Ratio enlisted the cooperation of another Israeli firm, Delek, who then brought in Texas-based Noble Energy to the venture – with whom it had previously developed the small Mari-B offshore gas field in southern Israel under the Yam Tethys partnership.

In July, 2010, Noble Energy announced that seismic studies indicated there was a 50% chance of the Leviathan field containing natural gas, with the potential reserve size being estimated at 16 trillion cubic feet (450 billion cubic metres). The initial exploration well, Leviathan 1, was drilled to a depth of 5,170 metres (16,960 ft) and the discovery was announced on 30 December 2010. The cost of drilling the exploration well was $92.5 million. The well was drilled by the Homer Ferrington rig.

The second stage of drilling of the Leviathan 1 well was intended to reach a depth of 7,200 metres (23,600 ft), which would include an additional natural gas reserve and potentially 600 million barrels of oil. While the gas discovery at -5170m was made in the Tamar sands layer which was already known to contain gas, the additional oil and gas potential exists in layers that have not been explored in the Levant basin. Noble has twice failed to reach the deeper layers due to technical challenges with drilling to the extreme depths involved. However, during drilling towards the intended target some gas was detected and as of 2012 Noble still had plans to explore those layers.

The Leviathan gas field was the second largest gas field in the Mediterranean Sea after the August 2015 discovery of the Zohr field off the coast of Egypt, only 6 km from Cyprus's Block 11. Chevron Corporation, which acquired Noble Energy in October 2020, operates Leviathan with a 39.66% working interest; Delek holds 22.67%; Avner Oil Exploration holds 22.67%; and Ratio Oil Exploration holds the remaining 15%. In February 2014, Woodside Energy agreed to buy a 25% stake of the Leviathan field for up to US$2.55 billion. It was announced on 21 May 2014 that Woodside Energy pulled out of an agreement to take a stake worth up to $2.7 billion in Israel's flagship Leviathan gas project, as the group developing the field shifted focus to regional markets.

In the summer of 2014, Netherland, Sewell & Associates (NSAI) made an upward revision on the amount of gas reserves, giving a 2P value of 621 BCM. The expected year of production was stated to be 2017. In April, 2015, the Israel Ministry of Energy reported that it was working with NSAI and the Leviathan partners to understand the discrepancy between the NSAI revised estimate and the estimate provided by other analyses provided to the ministry, indicated a best estimate of only 16.5 tcf (470 BCM).

On 19 October 2015, Russian President Vladimir Putin and Israeli Prime Minister Benjamin Netanyahu agreed to allow major concessions for Gazprom to develop the Leviathan reserves.

On 19 February 2018, The partners in Israel's Tamar and Leviathan natural gas fields signed $15 billion in deals to export natural gas to Egypt over 10 years. One accord calls for the sale of 3.5 BCM of natural gas annually from the Leviathan field, for a total of 32 BCM, estimating the sale from the Leviathan field to reach $7.5 billion. Regarding the deal, the Egyptian president, Abdel Fatah al-Sissi, declared about the project : "Has a lot of advantages for us (Egyptians). And I want people to be reassured". Yossi Abu, chief executive of Delek Drilling, said: "I think that the main thing is that Egypt is becoming the real gas hub of the region".

In September 2020, the owners of the field agreed to sell $190 million worth of natural gas to a power plant in Ramat Hovav.

In late February 2023, partners involved in Leviathan announced spending of $51 million to prepare a new floating LNG floating terminal, and an additional $45 million in expanding production. The floating LNG terminal, expected to come online in the mid-to-late 2020s, is expected to expand capacity to 6.5 bcm. According to CEO of Ratio Energies, Yigal Landau, "The development plan will enable a significant increase in Leviathan's production to 21 bcm (billion cubic meters) a year."

On 7 August 2025, Leviathan signed the largest export agreement in Israel's history worth approximately US$35 billion to supply gas to Egypt.

=== Inovo BV and Ratio Oil ===
Inovo BV, the Dutch corporation owned by Kamil Ekim Alptekin, claims to be the sole Turkish representative in Ratio Oil Exploration. Ratio has denied that it has any affiliation with Alptekin or Inovo BV, though BuzzFeed News has produced evidence documenting a relationship dating back to at least early 2016.

== Technical description ==
Gas production is carried out by four wells connected by two 18-inch, 73-mile subsea tiebacks to a natural gas processing platform located 10 km offshore Dor, Israel. The processing platform has the capacity to handle up to 1.2 BCF of gas per day (12 BCM per year) and could be expanded to handle up to 2.1–2.4 BCF per day (21–24 BCM per year). Gas and condensate pipelines link the platform to an onshore reception station at Dor which is connected to the domestic Israeli gas and liquid fuels pipeline networks.

== Rights dispute ==
The existence of the Leviathan gas fields poses several challenges to states in that area of the Eastern Mediterranean, in terms of cooperation between them, as well as for the wider Mediterranean energy context. After discovery of the Leviathan gas fields in 2010, Lebanon argued that the field extends into Lebanese waters. Lebanon's Parliament Speaker Nabih Berri stated that Israel is "ignoring the fact that according to the maps the deposit extends into Lebanese waters," Agence France-Presse reported on 9 June. Israeli Minister of National Infrastructures Uzi Landau responded "We will not hesitate to use our force and strength to protect not only the rule of law but the international maritime law," in an interview. In August 2010, Lebanon submitted to the United Nations its official view regarding the maritime border, indicating that it considered the Tamar and Leviathan gas fields to be outside Lebanese territory (though it indicated other prospective fields in the region may be within Lebanese territory). The US expressed support for the Lebanon proposal.

== Gas Exports ==
In January 2026, Chevron and its partners announced that a Final Investment Decision (FID) deal was reached in order to expand the Leviathan gas field's production capacity. The project aims to increase annual delivery to 21 bcm to bolster regional energy security.

== See also ==
- Block 12 - Cypriot gas field adjacent to Yishai gas field
- Energy Triangle - gas fields between Cyprus, Israel and Greece
- Economy of Israel
- List of natural gas fields
- Natural gas in Israel
- Sarah and Myra – two Israeli offshore drilling licences
- Lebanon-Cyprus maritime border agreement
