= Harel Group =

Israeli insurance group

Harel Insurance Investments and Financial Services Ltd. הראל השקעות בביטוח ושרותים פיננסים בע"מ
- Type: Public
- Traded as: TASE: HARL
- Industry: Financial services; Insurance
- Founded: 1935; 91 years ago
- Founder: Margot and Ernest Hamburger
- Headquarters: Ramat Gan, Israel
- Key people: Yair Hamburger (chairman); Gideon Hamburger (president); Ben Hamburger (vice chairman); Nir Cohen (CEO)
- Products: Life insurance; Provident Funds
- Operating income: ▲₪ 14,680 million (2018)
- Net income: ▲₪ 634 million (2018)
- Number of employees: >5000 (2019)
- Subsidiaries: Harel Insurance Company Ltd. Dikla Insurance Company Ltd. The Israel Credit Insurance Company Ltd. HaMishmar Insurance Agency Ltd.
- Website: www.harel-group.co.il

Harel Insurance Investments and Financial Services Ltd. (Hebrew: הראל השקעות בביטוח ושירותים פיננסים בע"מ) is the largest insurance group in Israel. It is a public company whose shares are traded on the Tel Aviv Stock Exchange and is included in the TA-100 Index. It is controlled by the Hamburger family, which owns 49.9% of the company's shares (mainly through a holding company), while the public holds 50.1%.

== History ==
In 1935, Ernst and Margot Hamburger, German Jews who moved to Tel Aviv at the time of the British Mandate of Palestine founded HaMishmar, a small insurance agency.

In 1975, the family established their first insurance company "Harel". In 1982 Harel Insurance and Finances (then known as Harel Hamishmar Investments Ltd.), was established and the ownership of Harel and Hamishmar were transferred to its ownership. The same year, the company had an initial public offering on the Tel Aviv Stock Exchange.

During the 1980s and 1990s the company acquired a number of other insurance companies in Israel (including: Sahar, Zion, Shiloach and Dikla) and consolidated its position to become Israel's third largest insurance group. During the 2000s the company expanded its activities and entered the pension and mutual funds markets.

In 2007, the name of the company was changed to "Harel Insurance Investments and Financial Services Ltd.".

In 2008 Harel Group established the Israel Infrastructure Fund together with Yehuda Raveh and Yaron Kestenbaum, which invests in and manages infrastructure projects in the fields of water, energy and transportation (trains and roads).

In December 2009 Harel acquired EMI, an Israeli mortgage unit of AIG – American International Group for $35.5m.

== See also ==
- Economy of Israel
