= Delek Group =

Israeli conglomerate

Delek Group Ltd.
- Type: Public
- Traded as: TASE: DLEKG
- Industry: Conglomerate
- Founded: 1951; 75 years ago
- Headquarters: Netanya, Israel
- Key people: Idan Wallance (CEO)
- Products: Oil, gas, automotive
- Revenue: ₪ 44.567 billion (2010)
- Net income: ₪ 1.225 billion (2010)
- Total assets: ₪ 91.896 billion (2010)
- Total equity: ₪ 4.877 billion (2010)
- Website: www.delek-group.com

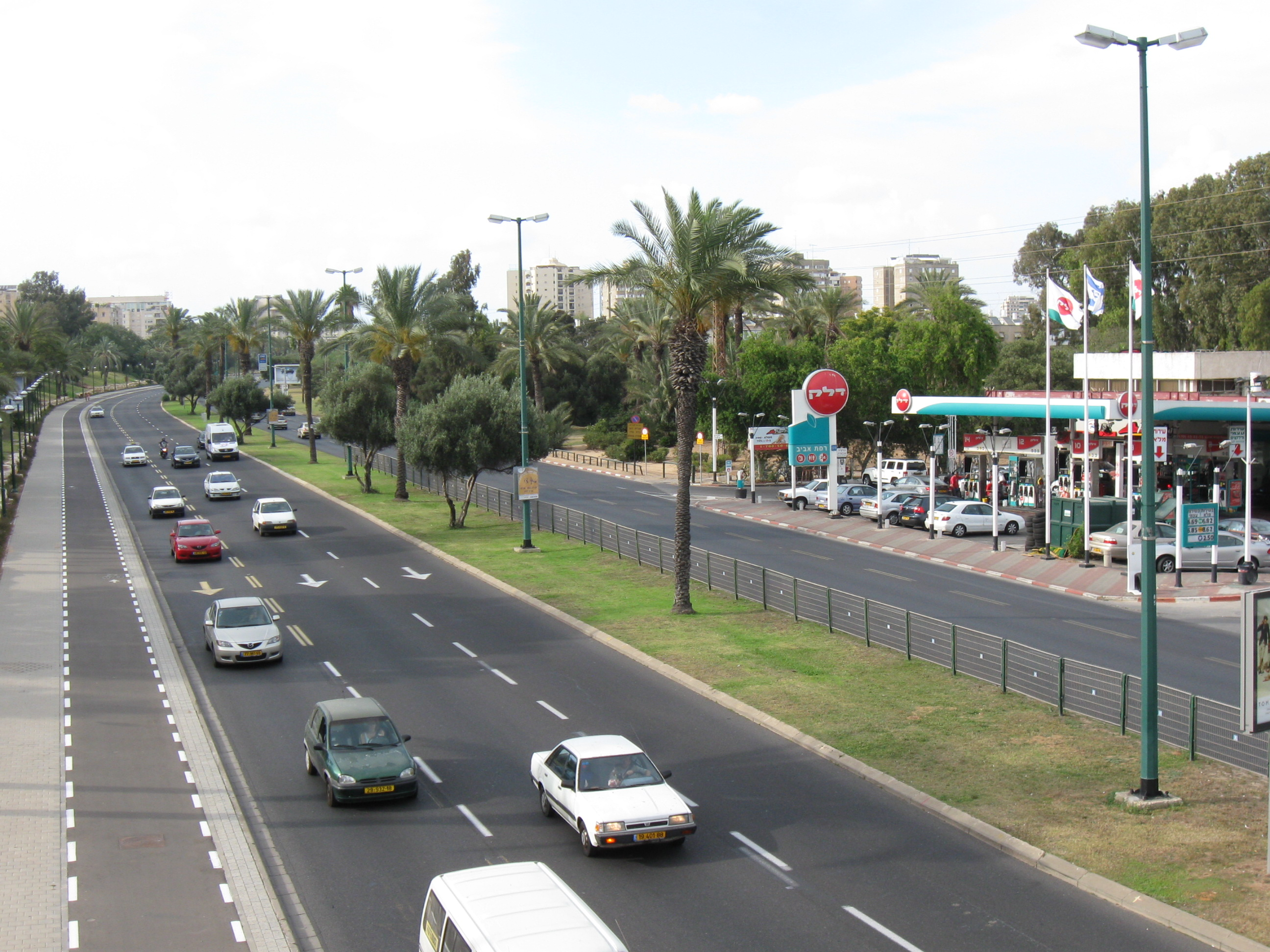
A Delek petrol station in Tel Aviv

Delek Group (Hebrew: קבוצת דלק) is an Israeli holding conglomerate mainly operating in the petroleum industry. Delek Group's largest subsidiary is Delek – The Israel Fuel Corporation, one of the largest chains of filling stations in Israel. Delek Group also owns E&P operations across the Levant, in the North Sea and in the Gulf of Mexico. Beyond the oil industry, it also owns coffeehouse chain Café Joe as well as 70% of the Israeli franchisee of Burger King.

Delek Group is listed on the Tel Aviv Stock Exchange under the ticker symbol, DLEKG, and is a member of the TA-35 Index of leading Israeli companies. Delek Group previously held major shares in automobile import company Delek Motors, nutraceuticals company Gadot Biochemistry, desalination company IDE Technologies and holding company Phoenix Financial, all of which were later sold.

== History ==
Delek Group was first founded as Delek – The Israel Fuel Corporation Ltd in 1951.

In 2006 it introduced its United States subsidiary, Delek US, which owned the Tyler, Texas oil refinery and 349 retail stores, in the New York Stock Exchange. A decade later, Delek US merged with the U.S. subsidiary of another Israeli company, Alon Israel Oil Co.

In August 2007, Delek Benelux took over marketing activities for Chevron Global Energy Inc. in Benelux, including 869 fueling stations, mostly under the Texaco brand. The same month, Delek Israel's Delek Pi-Glilot, a fuel storage and distribution company operating in Ashdod, Jerusalem and Beersheba, won a Government Companies Authorities tender to run the fuel storage facilities in Ashdod. A few months later in November, they announced the hiring of former police commissioner Moshe Karadi to run Delek Pi-Glilot. had recently resigned. Gabi Last, former commissioner and commander of the Tel Aviv Central District, has been chairing Delek Group for several years. On January 1, 2020, Idan Wallance became Delek's new CEO.

== Holdings ==
=== Energy and infrastructure ===
==== Upstream ====
- Delek Energy [87.6%]
- Delek Drilling LP (TASE: DEDR.L) [68.8%]
- Avner Oil & Gas Exploration LP (TASE: AVNR.L) [55.9%]
- Ithaca Energy [50.5%]

Assets include holdings in Yam Tethys Partnership, Tamar gas field, Leviathan gas field, Tanin gas field, Montrose and ascoaited oil fields and Aphrodite gas field.

==== Downstream ====
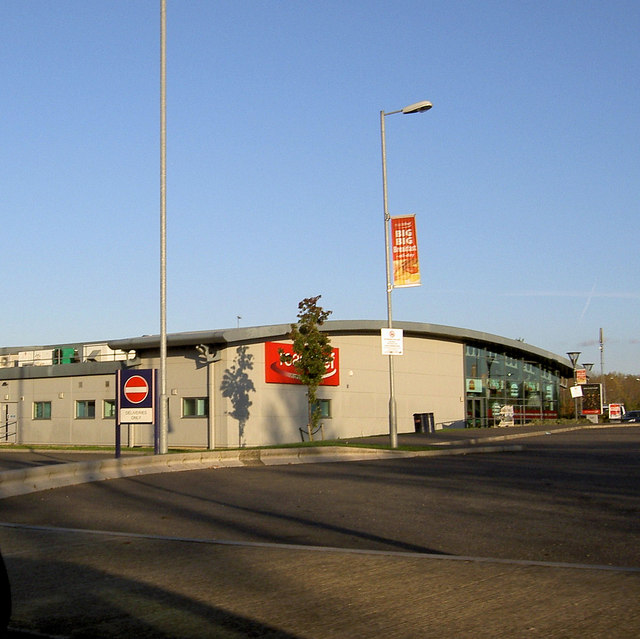
A Roadchef service station near the M1 motorway, England

- Delek Petroleum Ltd. [100%]
  - (European Union) Delek Europe BV [100%] - 1,230 gas stations and 935 convenience stores
  - Delek Israel Fuel Corporation Ltd (TASE: DLKIS) [86.9%] Israel’s second largest retail gas and lubricants supplier

=== Food and restaurants ===
- Café Joe [100%]
- Burger King (Israeli franchisee) [70%]

== Former holdings ==
- Delek Real Estate Ltd. - a company that owned a total land area of 1.8 million m^{2}, through its subsidiaries, Delek Berlon International Ltd., Delek Global Real Estate Ltd., and adding Dankner Investments Ltd. as Dankner Real Estate's construction arm in 2004
- HOT Cable Communications Systems Ltd.
- Starbucks Israel
- The Republic Group, an insurer, was sold to AmTrust Financial Services for $140 million on April 19, 2016.

=== Infrastructure ===
- Independent Power Plants (IPP)
- 360 desalinisation plants constructed in Israel, Cyprus, China, Spain, United States, India and Kazakhstan
- largest desalinisation plant in the world built in Israel

=== Insurance and finance ===
- (Israel) Phoenix Holdings Ltd.[56%]
  - The Phoenix Insurance Company Ltd. (TASE: PHOE)
  - Excellence Investments Ltd. (TASE: EXCE) [85%]
  - The Republic Group [share unknown]

=== Automotive ===
- Delek Automotive Systems Ltd. (branded as Delek Motors) (TASE: DLEA) [32%] - largest car dealer in Israel, importer of Mazda and Ford vehicles

=== Nutrition ===
- Gadot Biochemical Ltd.

== Criticism ==
=== Involvement in Israeli settlements ===
On 12 February 2020, the United Nations published a database of 112 companies helping to further Israeli settlement activity in the West Bank, including East Jerusalem, as well as in the occupied Golan Heights. These settlements are considered illegal under international law. Delek was listed on the database on account of its "provision of services and utilities supporting the maintenance and existence of settlements" and "the use of natural resources, in particular water and land, for business purposes" in these occupied territories.

On 5 July 2021, Norway's largest pension fund KLP said it would divest from Delek together with 15 other business entities implicated in the UN report for their links to Israeli settlements in the occupied West Bank.

== See also ==
- Tamar gas field
- Leviathan gas field
- Aphrodite gas field
