= Noble Energy =

Former U.S. energy company

Noble Energy, Inc.
- Formerly: Noble Affiliates, Inc.
- Type: Public company
- Traded as: Nasdaq: NBL
- Industry: Petroleum industry
- Founded: 1932; 94 years ago
- Defunct: October 5, 2020; 6 years ago
- Fate: Acquired by Chevron Corporation
- Headquarters: Houston, Texas, U.S.
- Key people: David L. Stover, (CEO); Kenneth M. Fisher, CFO
- Products: Petroleum; Natural gas Natural gas liquids
- Production output: 346 thousand barrels of oil equivalent (2,120,000 GJ) per day
- Revenue: ▲$4.986 billion (2018)
- Net income: ▲ -$0.066 billion (2018)
- Total assets: ▼$21.010 billion (2018)
- Total equity: ▼$10.484 billion (2018)
- Number of employees: 2,282 (2019)
- Website: nblenergy.com

Noble Energy, Inc. was a company engaged in hydrocarbon exploration headquartered in Houston, Texas. In October 2020, the company was acquired by Chevron Corporation.

The company was known as Noble Affiliates, Inc. until 2002.

As of December 31, 2018, the company had 1,929 million barrels of oil equivalent (1.180×10^{10} GJ) of proved reserves, of which 52% was in the United States, 43% was in Israel, and 5% was in Equatorial Guinea. Of the company's total proved reserves as of December 31, 2018, 62% was natural gas, 14% was natural gas liquids, and 24% was petroleum.

In the United States, the company's primary holdings were in the Wattenberg Gas Field / Denver Basin in Colorado, the Delaware Basin, and the Eagle Ford Group.

As of December 31, 2018, the company owned approximately 74,000 net developed acres and 111,000 net undeveloped acres between 10 and 90 miles offshore Israel in water depths ranging from 700 feet to 6,500 feet. Noble holds a 39.66% working interest in the Leviathan gas field, which it discovered in 2010 and a 25% working interest in the Tamar gas field. Through Dolphinus Holdings Limited, Noble sells any excess gas to Egypt after its natural gas obligations to Israel and Jordan have been met. The company owns a minority interest in and uses East Mediterranean Gas Company's Arab Gas Pipeline to transport the gas from Israel to Egypt. Exports to Jordan are facilitated by an existing low-capacity pipeline near the Dead Sea and a large capacity pipeline under construction in northern Israel and northern Jordan. Adjacent to the Israel acreage, the company owns a license covering approximately 33,000 net undeveloped acres in the Aphrodite gas field of Cyprus.

The company also owned interests in oil fields offshore Equatorial Guinea, Cameroon, and Gabon.

== History ==
In 1932, Lloyd Noble founded the Samedan Oil Corporation, predecessor company to Noble Energy, Inc. The company was named after his children Sam, Ed, and Ann. In 1968, Samedan acquired its first offshore block in the Gulf of Mexico. By the 1970s, Noble Affiliates Inc. was set up as a holding company to own Samedan Oil Corporation and a drilling company, Noble Drilling Corporation. In 1972, Noble Affiliates became a public company via an initial public offering, listing on the then-new National Association of Securities Dealers Automated Quotations (NASDAQ).

In 1980, Noble Affiliates was first listed on the New York Stock Exchange with the ticker symbol NBL. In 1985, Noble Affiliates spun off its subsidiary, Noble Drilling Corporation. In 1986, the company acquired Energy Development Corporation.

In June 2000, the company announced that it will move its headquarters from Ardmore, Oklahoma to Houston, Texas.

In October 2000, Charles Davidson became president and CEO of the company.

By April 2002, the company had diversified into methanol and electricity production, and changed its name to Noble Energy, Inc.

In May 2005, the company acquired Patina Oil & Gas, giving the company acreage in the Rocky Mountains.

In May 2006, the company sold assets in the Gulf of Mexico for $625 million.

In June 2006, the company announced a significant discovery in the Raton prospect of the Gulf of Mexico.

In January 2010, the company acquired assets in the DJ Basin of the Rocky Mountains from PetroCanada and Suncor Energy for $494 million.

In May 2010, the company's Deep Blue exploration well on Green Canyon 723 in the deepwater Gulf of Mexico reached a depth of 32,684 feet.

In December 2010, the company announced the discovery of the Leviathan gas field, offshore Israel.

In February 2011, the company received the first deepwater drilling permit in the Gulf of Mexico issued by the United States Department of the Interior after the moratorium following the Deepwater Horizon incident.

In 2012, the company moved its headquarters to a building formerly occupied by Hewlett Packard in northwest Houston, Texas and signed a lease for 497,000 square feet of office space.

In September 2012, the company sold assets in the Mid-Continent oil province for $594 million.

In October 2014, the company announced plans to establish a center to train technicians in the energy industry at Ruppin Academic Center in Israel with a donation of NIS 12 million.

In July 2015, the company acquired Rosetta Resources in a stock transaction. The acquisition gave the company acreage in the Eagle Ford Group.

In September 2015, the company announced that the drilling of a well in the Cheetah exploration prospect offshore Cameroon yielded a dry hole. The company recorded a $33 million charge for this unsuccessful venture.

In April 2017, the company acquired Clayton Williams Energy for $2.7 billion.

In May 2017, the company sold Marcellus Midstream to Quantum Energy Partners for $765 million. The company also sold its assets in the Marcellus Shale for $1.12 billion.

In January 2018, the company sold part of its interest in the Tamar gas field for $800 million.

In April 2018, the company sold its assets in the Gulf of Mexico.

In December 2018, the company acquired assets in the Eagle Ford Group and the Bakken Formation.

Effective December 30, 2019, the company moved its share listing from the New York Stock Exchange to the Nasdaq Global Select Market.

In October 2020, the company was acquired by Chevron Corporation.

== Controversies ==
In 2015, the government of Argentina accused the company of operating illegally in the Falkland Islands. The government of Argentina does not recognize British control of the Falkland Islands.

In 2015, the company settled a claim by the Environmental Protection Agency that its tank batteries were emitting noxious gases. The settlement included the payment of a $4.95 million civil penalty divided as follows: $3.475 million to the United States; and $1.475 million to Colorado.
