= Tel Aviv Stock Exchange =

Stock exchange located in Tel Aviv, Israel

Coordinates: 34.77059°N 32.06455°E

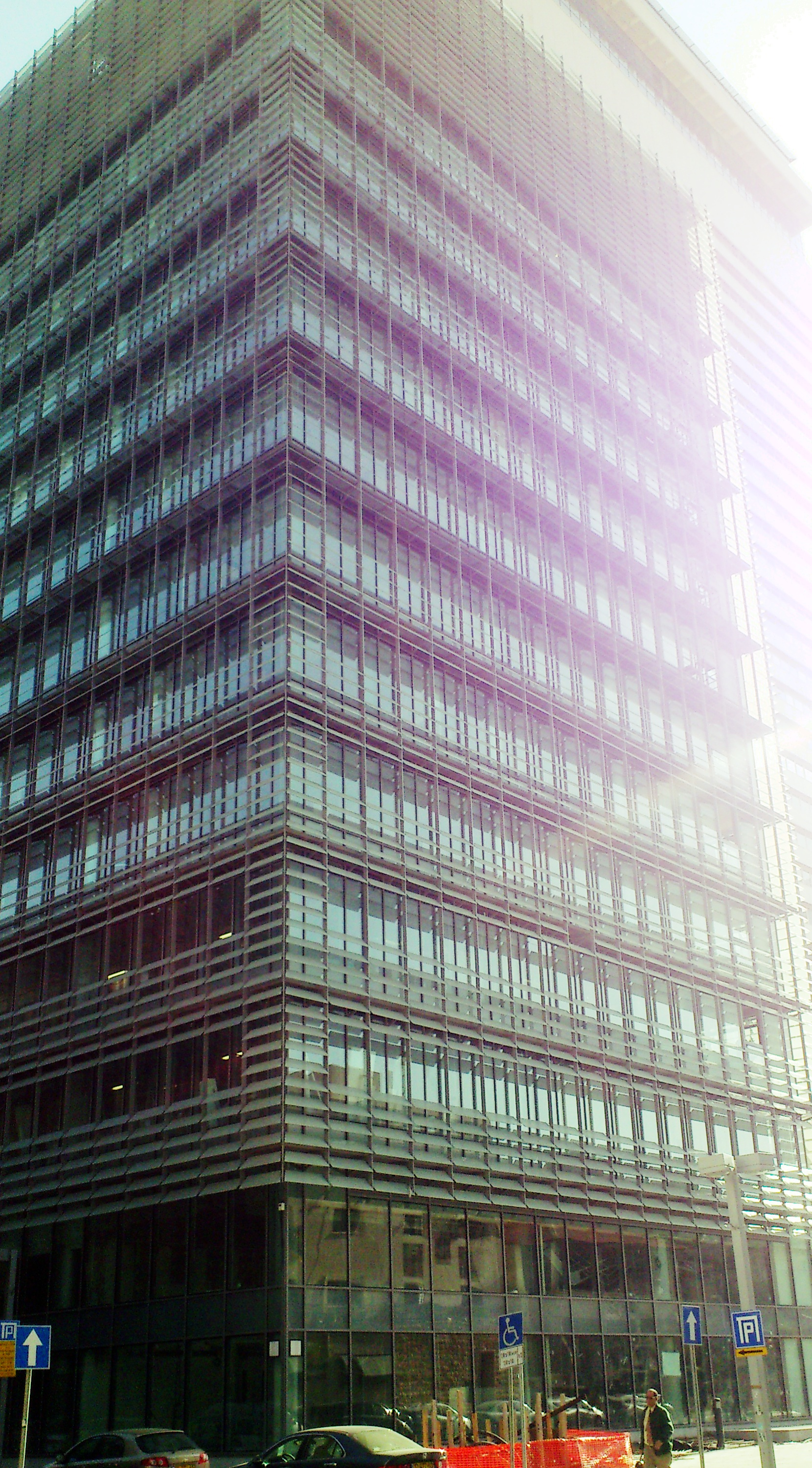
- Type: Stock exchange Public company
- Location: Tel Aviv, Israel
- Founded: 1953; 73 years ago (precursor 1935)
- Owner: 15 banks and 11 investment houses
- Key people: Arik Steinberg (chairman); Itai Ben-Zeev (CEO)
- Currency: Israeli new shekel (ILS)
- No. of listings: 473 companies listing equities 901 series of corporate bonds 204 series of government bonds 416 index-tracking products 1,231 mutual funds
- Market cap: ▲NIS 3.1 trillion (2026)
- Volume: ▲NIS 3.4 billion daily (2025)
- Indices: TA-35 Index; TA-125 Index; TA BlueTech Index; Tel Bond 20 Index; TA Global-BlueTech; Biomed Index; TS Tech-Elite Index, Cleantech Index; TA-125 Fossil Free
- Website: tase.co.il
- Traded as: TASE: TASE
- Industry: Stock exchange
- Founded: 1953; 73 years ago (precursor 1935)
- Headquarters: Tel Aviv
- Revenue: ▲NIS 563.5 million (2025)
- Operating income: ▲NIS 54.4 million (2021)
- Net income: ▲NIS 181 million (2025)
- Total assets: ▼NIS 1,616 million (2025)
- Total equity: ▼NIS 599.3 million (2025)
- Website: tase.co.il

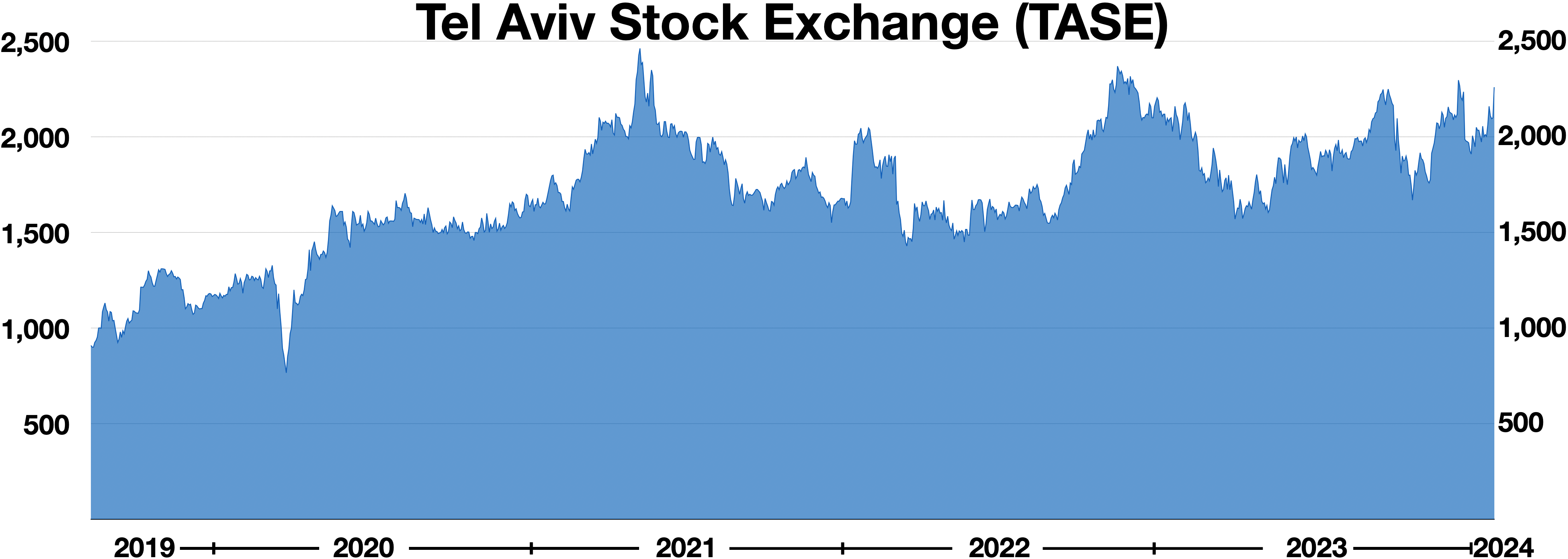
Tel Aviv Stock Exchange (TASE)

The Tel Aviv Stock Exchange (TASE; Hebrew: הַבּוּרְסָה לִנְיָירוֹת עֵרֶךְ בְּתֵל אָבִיב), colloquially known as The Bursa, is the only public stock exchange in Israel and a public company itself, listed on its own exchange since 1 August 2019. It is regulated by the Securities Law (1968) and is under the direct supervision of the Israel Securities Authority (ISA).

The TASE plays a significant role in the Israeli economy, facilitating the trade of securities and the raising of capital and debt for companies and the government on the Israeli capital market. Trading on the TASE is conducted exclusively through its 23 members, which include major banks and investment houses that collect a fee for their services.

The TASE was founded in 1953, with its precursor dating back to 1935. As of 2021, it lists 473 companies, 901 series of corporate bonds, 204 series of government bonds, 416 index-tracking products, and 1,231 mutual funds. The exchange's market capitalization for equities reached NIS 3.1 trillion, or roughly $1 trillion USD, at the end of the Hebrew year in September 2026.

== History and milestones ==
The Tel Aviv Stock Exchange was established in 1953. Even prior to this, commencing in 1935, securities trading was carried out in the Land of Israel and, afterwards, in the State of Israel at the mandate-period Anglo-Palestine Bank (today, Bank Leumi). The trade was conducted at the bank, in the office of Mordechai Pinchas Hasson, an Israeli banker who was one of the founders of the Exchange Bureau of Securities and the CEO of Bank Leumi. In the office that served as the stock exchange, daily trading within the framework of the "Exchange Bureau of Securities" lasted for just one hour. Among those that conceived the original idea were bankers who had immigrated from Germany such as Max Kollenscher and his brother Leo. In 1968, TASE activity was regulated by law and the Israel Securities Authority, which supervises TASE activity, was established.

In 1983, TASE was hit by the bank stock crisis, during which the share price of Israel's four largest banks collapsed – resulting in the state's nationalization of the banks and a third of the public's investment in them being wiped out. In the same year, TASE moved from its premises at 113 Allenby Street to a building at 54 Ahad Ha'Am Street, Tel Aviv. In 1993, trade in derivatives commenced. In 1999, TASE brought down the curtain on the trading floors era and completed the changeover to fully automated trading making use of a "continuous" trading system (TACT). In 2000, the Knesset passed Amendment No. 21 to the Securities Law, which makes it easier for companies whose shares are listed in the United States, to also list in Tel Aviv ("dual listing"). In July 2005, dual listing was expanded to include companies listed on the London Stock Exchange's Main Market and the Nasdaq Small Cap Market. Today, tens of dual-listed companies are traded on TASE (being listed in Tel Aviv and on overseas exchanges, in parallel). In 2005, market makers began operating on TASE. In 2007, the annual volume of securities and convertibles hit a new record of NIS 593.2 billion.

Since 2008, after the 2008 financial crisis, the tightening of the regulatory regime in which TASE operates (by the Israel Securities Authority, the Capital Market, Insurance and Savings Division at the Israeli Ministry of Finance, the Anti-Money Laundering Authority, etc.) and other factors, the number of trading participants and trading volumes have become less significant. In 2012, the annual volume of securities and convertibles amounted to just NIS 265.1 billion (a 54% decrease) – the lowest volume since 2004.

In 2016, TASE launched an analysis project for high-tech companies, within the framework of which the international research company, Frost and Sullivan, publishes informational and financial analyses regarding technology and biomed companies that are listed on TASE.

In 2017, the TASE indices underwent a reform – "the diffusion reform", which had several objectives, including: improving the stability of the TASE indices, broadening the sectoral diffusion within the various indices, setting more stringent threshold terms for the flagship indices and easing the threshold terms for the other indices, encouraging foreign investors to invest in the TASE indices, significantly increasing the free float rate for the shares included in the flagship indices, fully realizing the potential of small and medium company shares, and enlarging the infrastructure for launching new indices. At the beginning of 2017, the Knesset passed the second and third readings of a law for TASE's demutualization, which created the outline for turning it into a for-profit company.

In April 2017, the Knesset passed an amendment of the Securities Law enabling changes to TASE's ownership structure; in September 2017 the District Court ratified the TASE demutualization arrangement, enabling changes to TASE's ownership structure, whereby TASE became a for-profit company, while separating the ownership and control of TASE from membership therein. The Israel Securities Authority has regulatory oversight over TASE's operations, as well as over the Tel-Aviv Clearing House, the MAOF Clearing House and the Tel-Aviv Stock Exchange Nominee Company, which are wholly owned subsidiaries of TASE.

In 2018, the Nominee Company was established as a private subsidiary of TASE. The Nominee Company is engaged in two main areas of activity: it ensures the proper and complete registration of the number of securities registered in its name (held by the public) and serves as a conduit for the transfer of payments deriving from corporate actions (such as dividends, interest) between the issuing companies and the end-holders of the securities. In August 2018, the Israel Securities Authority approved^{]} the sale of 71.7% of TASE's shares to five groups of foreign investors. On 1 August 2019, trade in TASE shares commenced on the Tel-Aviv Stock Exchange.

The 2017 indices reform

At the beginning of 2017, TASE carried out a comprehensive reform of the security indices listed on it and established new indices. Among the principal changes made by the reform was expanding the number of shares included in each index and lowering a share's maximum weighing in an index. For instance, the Tel Aviv 25 Index, which was considered TASE's flagship index was expanded from 25 to 35 shares, with its name being changed to the TA- 35 Index, accordingly. The maximum weighting for a share in the Index was reduced from 10% to 7%. One of the main objectives of the reform was to reduce the level of concentration in the indices. Since more than 70% of the Index's weighting related to just 10 shares, a sharp change in the value of just one of these would cause the Index to react dramatically, and the Index was considered to be too concentrated.

As part of the reform, new indices were created with the aim of raising investors' interest in TASE and increasing activity thereon. The new indices that were created are: the TA-BlueChip15Price, the TA-SME150 and the TA Rimon indices.

=== TASE members ===
The Israeli Stock Exchange has 23 members.

TASE members
3 foreign banks: Barclays Bank PLC (UK); Citibank, N.A. (USA); HSBC Bank PLC (UK); 11 Israeli commercial banks: Union Bank of Israel Ltd.; Israel Discount Bank Ltd.; Mercantile Discount Bank Ltd.; Bank Hapoalim B.M.; Bank of Jerusalem Ltd.; Bank Leumi Le-Israel B.M.; Mizrahi Tefahot Bank Ltd.; Bank Yahav Government Employees Ltd.; First International Bank of Israel Ltd.; Bank Otsar Ha-Hayal Ltd.; Bank Massad Ltd.	2 foreign investment houses: UBS Securities (Switzerland); Citigroup Financial Products Israel (UK); 5 Israeli investment houses: Excellence Nessuah Brokerage; Psagot Securities; Meitav Dash Trade; Israel Brokerage and Investments IBI; 3 remote members: Merrill Lynch International; Flow Traders B.V; Jefferies

=== TASE's home ===
In 1960, TASE moved to its own premises in the "Passage" at 113 Allenby Street in Tel Aviv and, in February 1983, TASE moved premises to 54 Ahad Ha'Am Street in Tel Aviv. In 2001, a Visitors Centers was opened on the historic trading floors of the TASE building. Educational visits took place in the Visitors Center, as well as conventions and events associated with the capital market[

On 24 July 2014, TASE moved to its new home on the corner of Montefiore Street and Ahuzat Bayit Street, close to the Shalom Meir Tower. The TASE complex stands on a one and a half dunam plot that was acquired by it in 2007 at a cost of NIS 58 million and construction took five years. The 14 story building tops out at 60 meters and has 22,600 m^{2} of floor space. The nonstandard ratio between the number of stories and the building's height is due to the building having stories with high ceilings, such as the ground floor that rises to a height of 10 meters.

Heads of TASE
CEO	Year
Mordechai Zagagy	1953
Zeev Ottensosser	
Yossi Nitzani	1980–1983
Ester Levanon	June 2006–December 2013
Yossi Beinart	January 2014–September 2016
Gal Landau-Yaari	September 2016–January 2017
Ittai Ben Zeev	January 2017–present
Chairmen
Ernest Lehman	1953
Meir Chet	1978–1986
Chaim Shettsel	1986–1996
Yair Orgler	1996–2006
Saul (Sam) Bronfeld	2006–2013
Amnon Neubach	2014–2021
Arik Steinberg	2021–present

== Growth ==
In 1993 TASE had the third most IPOs of all the world stock exchanges.

In 2005, non-Israeli investment in TASE reached an all-time high of NIS 2 billion, while the TA-25 increased 34%. By the end of the year foreign investment banks UBS, Deutsche Bank, and HSBC had become members of TASE.

In 2007, trading averaged $500 million a day, a 55% increase over the previous year. The number of exchange-traded funds (ETFs) grew to 240. The Tel Bond-20 index was also launched that year. The TA-25 rose 175% in the period 2004–07.

In May 2008 Northern Trust started the first US exchange-traded fund on the NYSE based on TASE's benchmark, the TA-25 Index.

=== Performance ===
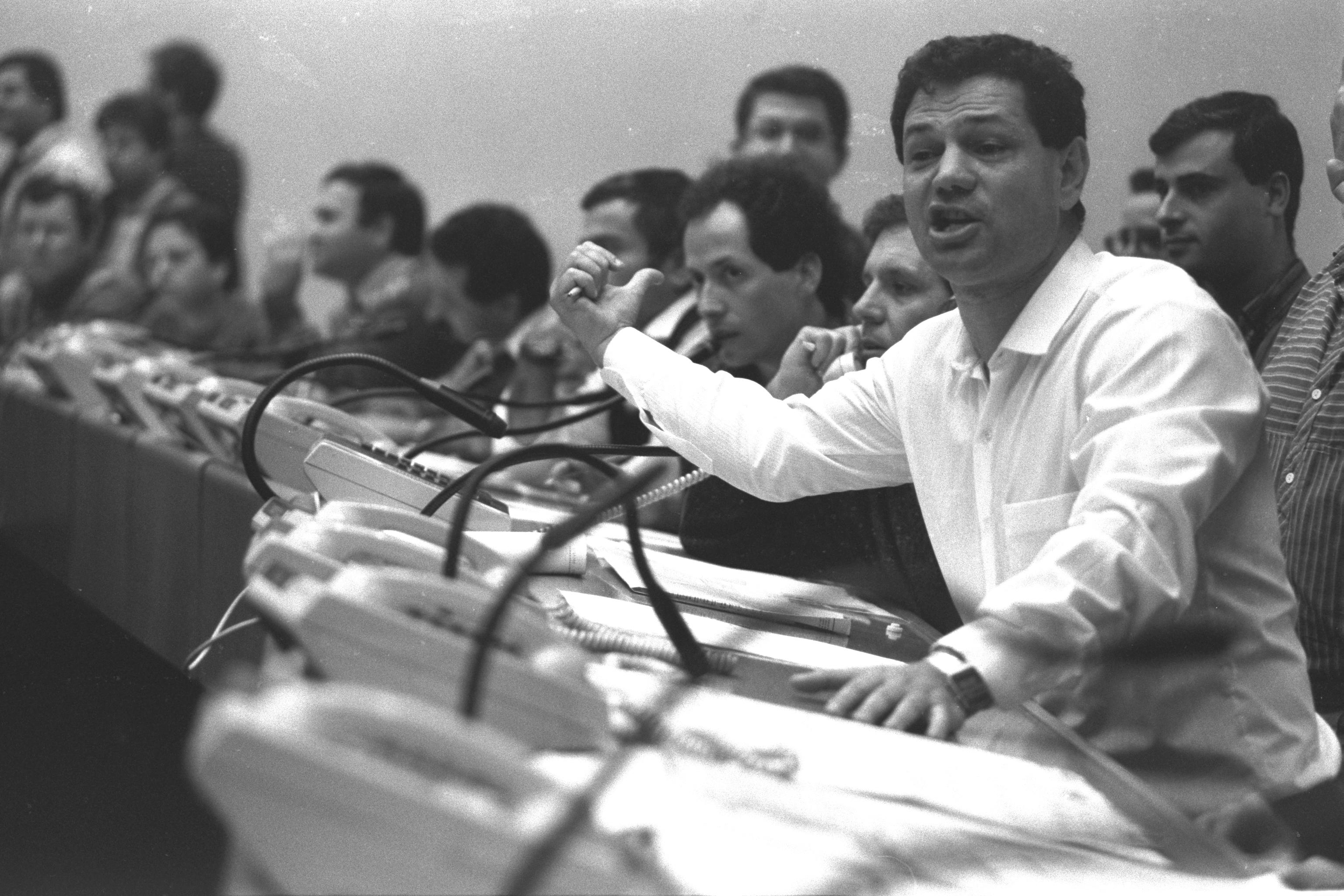
A broker giving an order to purchase stocks, 1989

As of 25 May 2010, TASE's largest stocks by market capitalization were Teva Pharmaceutical Industries ($51.5 billion), Israel Chemicals ($14.3bn), Bank Leumi ($6.1bn), and Bezeq ($6.0bn). Daily turnover of shares and convertibles in 2009 was US$432 million, $1,035M of bonds and exchange-traded notes (ETNs), $163M of T-bills, and 252,000 options and futures contracts. Total market capitalization at the end of 2009 was $189bn shares and convertibles, $174bn government and corporate bonds, and $23bn T-bills, a total of $386bn. On 25 April 2010, TASE's benchmark TA-25 index reached a record high of 1,239 points.

For the decade ending 12 February 2012, the TA–25 index topped the Bloomberg Riskless Return Ranking list, outperforming 23 other developed-nation benchmark indexes when adjusting for volatility.

CEO Ester Levanon resigned on 18 July 2013, effective 31 December 2013. A week later, on 25 July 2013, Chairman Saul Bronfeld resigned. According to Bloomberg, the executives' decisions follow a drop in trading volume and the bourse's failed bid to join MSCI Inc.'s Europe Index. Bronfeld, who served as chairman since 2006, cited the "hostile control" by the Israel Securities Authority and the regulator's interference in the executive management of the bourse as the main reasons for his resignation.

Increase in trading volumes in 2020

The average daily trading volume on the equities market in 2020 amounted to approximately NIS 1.9 billion, some 35% higher than the average volume in the years 2015–2019 (that amounted to approximately NIS 1.4 billion per day). The major contributor to the rise in trading volumes was global coronavirus pandemic, which reached Israel in February 2020, and led to a steep increase in trading volatility on the markets.

Growth in the number of retail accounts with Israeli members of TASE in 2020

The Israeli capital market was stormed by the local retail public in 2020, which opened a significantly greater number of new accounts with TASE members than in 2019. Some 141,000 new accounts were opened by the general public during 2020, compared to some 98,000 new accounts in 2019, a 44% increase. The pace at which non-bank members acquired new members – some 170% more than in 2019 – was particularly noticeable. Among the banks, the growth was 36% up on the previous year.

==== Dividend distribution in 2023 ====
In 2023, despite significant events such as war and legal reform, about 40% of the companies listed on the Tel Aviv Stock Exchange continued to distribute dividends to their shareholders. This included notable dividends in the energy, oil and gas sectors, as well as in the banking and financial services sector.

The Tel Aviv Stock Exchange reported that 206 listed companies distributed dividends totalling approximately 27.2 billion shekels in 2023. This was slightly less than the all-time high recorded in 2022 when 233 companies distributed about 28.6 billion shekels. Despite these uncertainties, the percentage of public holdings in traded stocks on the exchange has gradually increased over the recent years, reaching 63.3% by the end of 2023. This trend contributed significantly to an increase in the proportion of dividends received by the public.

The year 2023 also marked a record in the total dividends distributed to public shareholders, which was about 62% of the distributed sum (16.8 billion shekels), as opposed to approximately 55% of the dividends (15.8 billion shekels) in 2022. The remaining dividends were paid to stakeholders. The average dividend yield of the listed companies in 2023 amounted to approximately 2.9%, compared to about 2.8% in the previous year. This was the highest yield since 2017, topping the yield of the record year of 2022. The market value in 2023 was approximately 9% lower than in 2022, while the total dividend was only about 5% lower than the previous year.

==== 2026 ====
In early March 2026, during the conflict with Iran, the TASE climbed sharply on its first trading day after the escalation started. The TA-35 index went up around 4.6% and the TA-125 rose roughly 4.8%, pushing both to new record levels. Defense companies, energy stocks, and banks did especially well, and the shekel gained more than 1.5% against the dollar.

=== International agreements ===
In February 2007 the TASE signed a formal memorandum of understanding with the London Stock Exchange intended to smooth the trading of securities listed on both exchanges. At the time, 50 Israeli companies were listed on the London Stock Exchange. A similar memorandum of understanding was signed with The Nasdaq Stock Market in November 2007. NASDAQ at the time had 70 Israeli companies listed on the exchange, with a combined global market capitalization of over US$60 billion.

In July 2008, the TASE entered into a memorandum of understanding with NYSE Euronext. At the time seven Israeli companies traded on the NYSE.

In November 2008 the TASE and the Shanghai Stock Exchange signed a memorandum of understanding, with delegations to be sent to each other's markets to deepen understanding and promote trade. In February 2010, the TASE and the Toronto Stock Exchange signed a memorandum of understanding, committing to the cultivation of stronger ties between the two exchanges.

== Trading and features ==
=== Operating hours ===
TASE only operates from Sunday through Thursday. TASE does not operate on Friday as it is a short workday. TASE also does not operate on Israeli national and religious holidays. Every so often, the idea of changing the trading days is raised such that TASE would not operate on Sundays and would operate on Fridays. The reasons for proposing this change include the relatively low trading volume on Sundays, due mainly to the world's main stock exchanges not operating on Sundays.

The TASE trading schedule on workdays is divided into five phases: "pre-opening", "opening auction", "continuous trading", "pre-closing", and "closing auction".

On the days when operations are conducted, trading is executed between the hours of 9:25 in the morning (derivatives – from 9:45) and 17:25 in the afternoon (and for derivatives – 17:35) local time (GMT+2).

Since 8 March 2020, trading on Sundays occasionally ends at between 15:49 and 15:50 local time (GMT+2). Correspondingly, derivatives trading on such Sundays ends 35 minutes earlier, viz. at 16:00 on local time (GMT+2).

Calcalist reported in May 2024 that TASE is expected to begin operating also on fridays. This will allow TASE to be included in the European MSCI.

=== Products ===
Several financial products are traded on TASE:

- Equities: A security that represents a share of a company's ownership.
- Bonds: A security that represents a loan granted to the issuer of the security, with pre-determined repayments terms and interest.
- Corporate bonds: bonds issued by a company.
- Government bonds: bonds issued by the state of Israel.
- "Makams" (T-bills): Short-term bonds (up to one year) issued at a discount by the Bank of Israel.
- Convertible bonds: bonds that are convertible into a share in consideration for a pre-determined payment (similar to an option)
- Exchange-traded notes (ETNs): a security that tracks the price of a product or a particular financial index in Israel or elsewhere in the world. There are ETNs that are calculated according to a formula that is associated with one or more indices. Thus, for example, there are short ETNs that move inversely in relation to a particular index (the note's value rises as the index falls, and vice versa).
- Exchange-traded funds (ETFs): A financial instrument intended to passively track equity and commodity indices. The fund invests its money through linkage to a particular, pre-determined, index, without any discretion being exercised by the fund's management.

The fund does not guarantee a return linked to the movement in the index and the return for the investor can be higher or lower than the movement in the selected index, due to the fund's trading activity and the deviation (generally, small) in the composition of the fund's assets. Actually, an ETF is obligated to make its best effort to track the index and, as such, the ETF should generate a similar, if not an identical, return to the movement in the index that it tracks.

An ETF is a hybrid product, since it is listed on TASE like any other security listed on TASE and can be bought or sold on TASE. However, in addition to this, the investor has the possibility of buying or selling the ETF, in a similar fashion to open-end mutual funds (funds that are not listed on TASE). Like mutual funds, the ETF is subject to the Joint Investment Trusts Law.

- Mutual funds: A fund managed by an investment house that invests its money according to the decisions of the fund's management and according to a pre-published prospectus.
- Option warrants: A warrant entitling its holder to convert it into a share or a bond in consideration for a pre-determined payment. These are traded through the TACT system, in contrast to stock exchange derivatives, which are traded through the TACT-Derivatives system.
- The MAOF (a Hebrew acronym for "future and financial instruments") market – derivatives – options and future contracts on an index, individual securities (a bond or an equity) or exchange rates. TASE's MAOF Clearing House is a counterparty for every option, serving as a central clearing house; this is in contrast to option warrants which are a contract with a specific company. Every trader can write and purchase such securities. Options on the TA-35 Index are the product that is the most traded on TASE, with strong activity also taking place in shekel-dollar options. Derivatives are traded in the MAOF arena and have different trading byelaws from those for other assets traded through the regular TACT system (for example, on the MAOF system, prices are quoted in shekels, while on TACT they are quoted in agorot).
- TASE UP: a platform designed for private companies with the aim of allowing them to raise funds from institutional and accredited investors. The TASE UP platform is separate from the TASE trading platform for public companies and companies listed thereon remain private – not making an IPO, not having to report in accordance with the Securities Law and not being subject to the obligation of having to publish a prospectus when listing its securities.
- TASE Data Hub: The TASE Data Hub allows access to TASE's data systems. The system was launched, in 2020 and allows access to a broad range of data products relating to the Israeli capital market, using an API (Application Programming Interface) or through daily reports sent to the recipient's personal or organizational email. TASE's API provides access to TASE's databases and is customized to the end-customer's personal or organizational needs.

=== Fees ===
TASE collects fees from its members on every transaction executed thereon, calculated in thousands of a percent of the asset value in the case of the TACT system and in tens of agorot per MAOF option unit.

Citizens interested in trading on TASE do so through the TASE members (the abovementioned banks and investment houses), which collect a considerably higher fee for their services from low-volume traders. The banks collect, using their default pricelist (0.6–0.8%), a fee that is 100–200 times higher than the TASE fee charged to them. It is usually possible to obtain a discount of tens of percent from the banking pricelist, just by asking, even if volumes are not significant (reducing the fee to 0.2–0.3%). The fee collected from low-volume traders by non-bank members (i.e., the investment houses) is lower (approximately 0.1%), only some 20 times higher than the TASE fee.

Significant-volume private and institutional traders receive a considerable discount from both the banks and the investment houses, so that the fees collected from the larger traders are at tariffs approaching the TASE pricelist.

Furthermore, the Israeli banks collect a range of different fees in relation to transactions with TASE, such as distribution fees for mutual funds and "custodianship fees", which is an archaic fee that very few of the investment houses continue to collect; it amounts to 0.1–0.2% annually and originates from the time when securities were actual paper documents that were kept in a safe for the bank's customers. In the digital world, the justification for this fee is less clear and most of TASE's non-bank members do not collect this fee from their customers; the banks too are tending to waive this fee for some of their customers. TASE publishes a fees comparison table on its website, which allows the different trading fees to be swiftly compared.

=== The companies listed on TASE ===
During the 1960s, the scope of activity on TASE was limited and, in 1965, only 80 companies were listed on TASE. At the end of January 2021, 457 companies were listed on TASE with a total market cap of NIS 837 billion.

Type of company	Number of companies on TASE	Market cap in NIS billions
Banks	7	107
Insurance	7	25
Financial services	24	20
Biomed	51	92
Technology	89	214
Commerce and services	67	72
Real estate and construction	87	155
Industry	60	74
Investment and holdings	37	38
Oil and gas exploration	28	40
Total	457	837

== The TASE indices ==
Since the Israeli stock exchange indices reform at the beginning of 2017, there have been two equity universes. The Rimon universe is the senior of the two, and comprises some 230 shares that are suitable to be used as underlying assets for derivatives. Such shares have a higher value and more stringent threshold criteria in relation to the free float. The Tamar universe comprises some 350 shares, including smaller value shares as well as shares with a lower free float.

Market cap equity indices by market cap
Index name	
TA-35 Index (formerly the MAOF Index)	The index represents the prices of the 35 largest shares (from the aspect of their market cap) on TASE that are included in the Rimon universe. The weighting of each share in the Index is determined according to the value of its free float. The derivatives traded on this index include the marketable "TA-35" options.
TA-125 Index	The index represents the share price of the 125 largest companies on TASE that are included in the Rimon universe. The Index consists of the TA-35 Index with the addition of the TA-90 Index. Options on this index are traded on TASE's derivatives market.
TA-125 Fossil Free Index	An index that represents the share price of the 125 largest companies on TASE that are included in the Rimon universe, other than corporations that play a part in the fossil fuels production chain. The Index was announced on 9 November 2020, and was launched on 6 December 2020.
TA-90 Index	An index that represents the price of the 90 shares of the largest companies that are included in the Rimon universe after those comprising the TA-35 Index.
A-SME60 Index	an index that represents the price of the 60 shares of the companies with the highest free float market cap that are included in the Rimon universe after those comprising the TA-125 Index.
The TA-Growth' (formerly the Yeter Rest of Shares and Convertibles Universe Index)	includes all the shares that are included in the Tamar universe, which are not included in the TA-125 Index and the TA-SME60 Index.
TA-AllShare Index (formerly the TA Universe Index)	comprises all the Israeli shares that are included in the Tamar universe. It was first published in July 2010.

Sectoral equity indices
Index name	Description
TA-Banks5	Index consists of the five largest banks that are included in the Rimon universe. Derivatives are also traded on this index.
TA-Finance	Index consists of all the financial shares (banks, insurance financial services) in the Tamar universe.
TA Insurance-Plus Index	has been published since April 2011 and consists of all the shares in the Tamar universe in the insurance and financial services sector (but not banks).
TA-RealEstate Index	consists of all the real estate shares on TASE that are included in the Tamar universe.
TA-Construction Index	has been published since February 2020 and consists of all shares in the Real Estate-Construction subsector on TASE that are included in the Tamar universe.
TA-Investment Properties in Israel Index	has been published since February 2020 and consists of all shares in the Investment Properties in Israel subsector on TASE that are included in the Tamar universe.
TA-Investment Properties Abroad Index'	has been published since February 2020 and consists of all shares in the Investment Properties Abroad subsector on TASE that are included in the Tamar universe.
TA-Biomed Index	An index that represents the aggregate change in the price of shares included in the equity universe of public companies engaged in R&D in the life sciences, biotechnology, medications, and medical devices sectors.
TA-Technology	An index that represents the aggregate change in the price of shares included in the equity universe of public companies engaged in science services, software and Internet, electronics and optics, and communication systems and equipment.
TA Global-Blue Tech Index	has been published since April 2011 and consists of all the shares that are included in the TA-Technology Index and the TA-Biomed Index.
The TA Tech-Elite Index	has been published since May 2014 and consists of the shares of the companies that are included in the TA Global-BlueTech Index whose market cap exceeds NIS 75 million.
The TA-Cleantech Index	has been published since November 2020 and consists of all the shares in the Tamar universe in the green energy production and uses field
The TA-Energy Utilities Index	has been published since July 2019 and consists of the shares in the energy subsector and the energy shares in the cleantech subsector.
The TA Oil & Gas Index	has been published since April 2011 and consists of all the shares in the Tamar universe in the oil and gas exploration field.
The TA Communications and Information Technology Index	has been published since April 2011 and consists of all the shares in the Tamar universe in the communications and information technology field.

In addition to these, there are other market cap and sectoral indices, as well as government bond indices.

Value equity indices
Index name	Description
TA-Family Index	has been published since October 2018 and consists of all the Israeli shares in the list of family shares defined by the Raya Strauss Family Business Research Center and that are included in the Rimon universe.
Tel-Div Index'	has been published since July 2006 and consists of the largest shares having a consistent dividend yield of at least 2%, subject to the threshold criteria of the Index.
TA-Maala Index	has been published since February 2005 and consists of the shares of public companies that have been granted a "Maala" rating for corporate responsibility (ESG), which examines social, environmental, ethical and governments criteria, and that is included in the equity's universe.

Tel Bond indices
Index name	Description
Tel-Bond 20 Index	The Tel-Bond 20 Index is the flagship index of the Tel-Bond indices. It is composed of the 20 CPI-linked, fixed interest corporate bonds that are rated -A or higher, having the highest market caps of all the CPI-linked bonds that are included in the bonds universe, with a restriction on the number of series per issuer.
Tel-Bond 40 Index	The Tel-Bond 40 Index is composed of the 40 CPI-linked, fixed interest corporate bonds that are rated -A or higher, having the highest market caps of all the bonds of this class that are not included in the Tel-Bond 20 Index and that are included in the bonds universe, with a restriction on the number of series per issuer
Tel-Bond 60 Index	The Tel-Bond 60 Index is an index that consists of all the bonds that are included in the Tel-Bond 20 Index and the Tel-Bond 40 index.
Tel-Bond-CPI Linked Index	The Tel-Bond-CPI Linked Index consists of the CPI-linked, fixed interest corporate bonds that are rated -A or higher, which are included in the bonds universe, with a restriction on the number of series per issuer.
Tel-Bond Non-Linked Index	The index is composed of the corporate bonds included in the Tel-Bond-Shekel Index and the Tel-Bond-Floating Index. The weighting of each of the bond series included in the Index is restricted to 2%.
Tel-Bond- CPI-Linked Yeter Index	The Tel-Bond- CPI-Linked Yeter Index consists of the CPI-linked, fixed interest corporate bonds that are rated -A or higher, which are not included in the Tel-Bond 60 Index but are included in the bonds universe, with a restriction on the number of series per issuer.
Tel-Bond-Yields Index	The Tel-Bond-Yields Index consists of the CPI-linked, fixed interest corporate bonds that have a rating from Maalot ranging from (BBB-) to (A) or from Midroog ranging from (Baa3) to (A2), which are included in the bonds universe, with a restriction on the number of series per issuer.
Tel Bond-CPI-Linked Banks Index	The Tel Bond-CPI-Linked Banks Index consists of the CPI-linked, fixed interest corporate bonds that are rated -A or higher, which the banks have issued and which are included in the bonds universe, with a restriction on the number of series per issuer.
Tel Bond-Shekel Index	The Tel Bond-Shekel Index consists of the non-linked, fixed interest corporate bonds that are rated -A or higher, which are included in the bonds universe, with a restriction on the number of series per issuer.
Tel Bond-Floating Index	The index is composed of floating corporate bonds, which are included in the Tel-Bond universe. The Index consists of non-linked, floating corporate bonds, which are included in the Tel-Bond universe.
Tel Bond Shekel-50 Index	The index consists of the corporate bonds of the 50 largest companies having an attachment to Israel, which are included in the Tel Bond-Shekel Index.
Tel Bond-Dollar Index	the Tel Bond-Dollar Index consists of the dollar-linked corporate bonds, that are rated A− or higher, which are included in the bonds universe, with a restriction on the number of series per issuer.

== Regulation ==
TASE's operations are governed by the Securities Law, 1968 and the Israel Securities Authority supervises its activity as well as enforcing the laws applicable to public companies. In order to be listed on TASE, a company is required to meet certain criteria, both at the time of making its offering and during the listing period; these criteria are grounded on the TASE Code and on temporary regulations. The TASE Code is intended to prescribe the rules for the equitable and proper conduct of TASE and is a document that is frequently updated in correlation with changes in the Israeli capital market.

=== Dual listing ===
Reliefs were made to the law in 2000 pursuant to which some of the regulations imposed by the Securities Law on dual-listed companies were removed. Companies that are listed on another recognized stock exchange (a closed list of stock exchanges in advanced nations (the NASDAQ, the New York Stock Exchange (NYSE), the NYSE MKT (formerly, AMEX), and the London Stock Exchange's (LSE) Main Market and High Growth Segment) can easily and simply dual-list on TASE using the overseas reporting and regulatory format, with limited Israeli regulatory requirements. In addition, listing reliefs have been implemented for companies listed in Israel wishing to list on recognized overseas exchanges and changes have been made to the reporting regime accordingly.

In light of the ever-increasing interest from Israeli companies to also list on markets in the Far East, including Singapore and Hong Kong, due either to business links with these markets or to perceiving the attractiveness of these markets for fundraising, the Israel Securities Authority submitted a proposal that was approved by the Knesset Finance Committee in June 2018, pursuant to which the dual-listing arrangements were extended so as to include three additional stock exchanges: Singapore, Hong Kong and Toronto.
