= Electricity sector in Israel =

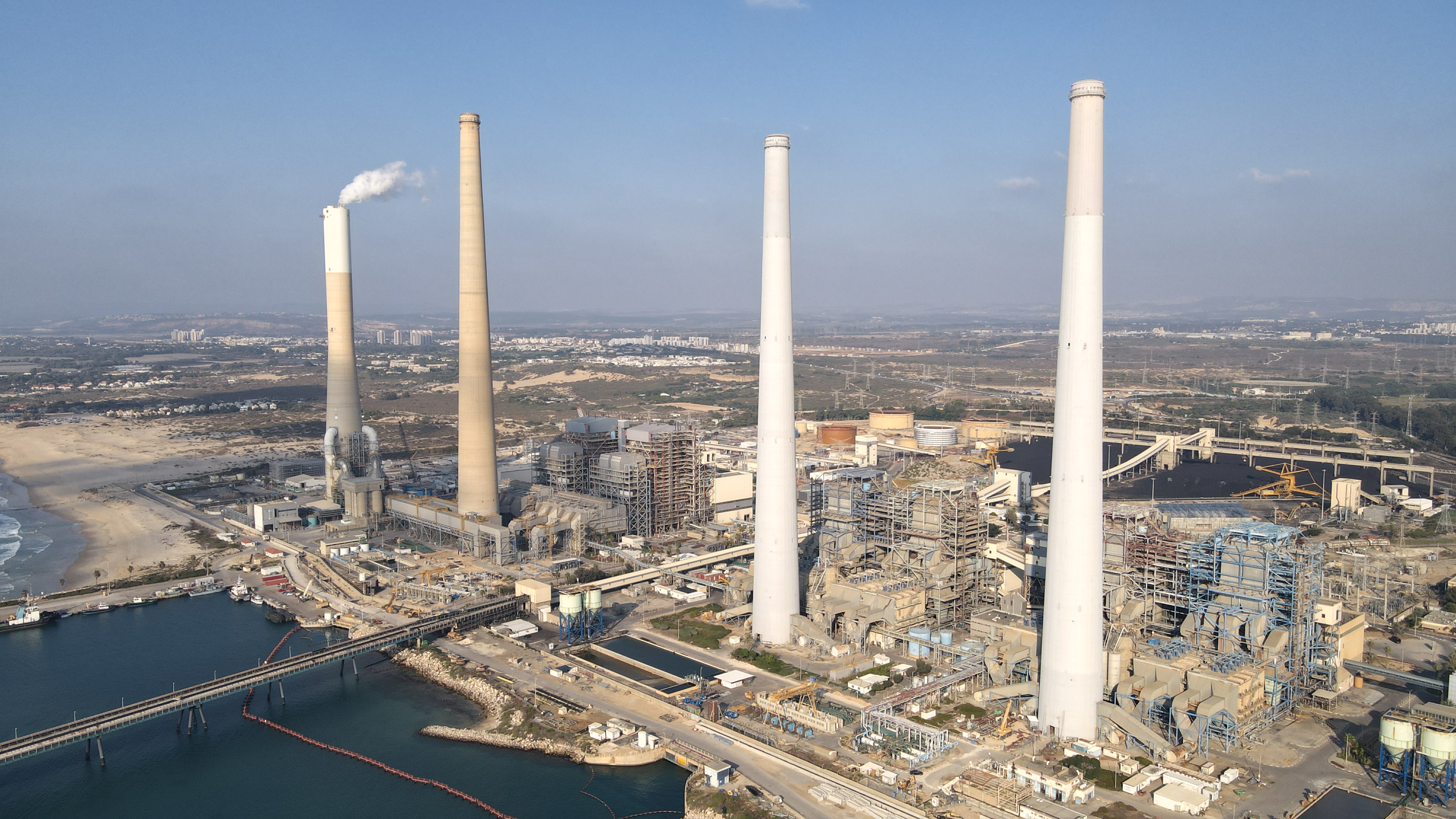
Orot rabin power station

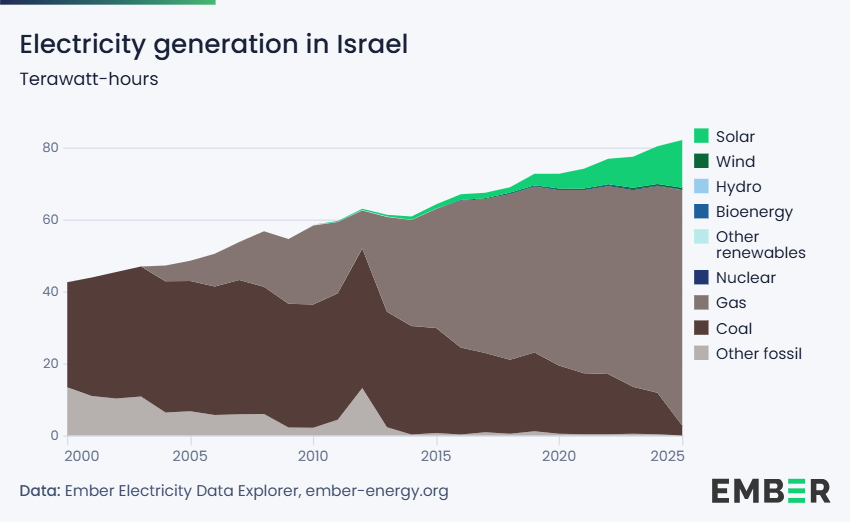
Electricity generation in Israel in terawatt-hours

The electricity sector in Israel encompasses the production, transmission, and distribution of electricity within the State of Israel and territories under its control. The supply of electricity is entirely regulated by the government of Israel, with every operation requiring approval from the Ministry of Energy and Water Resources and the Electricity Authority.

Since the beginning of commercial electricity production in Mandatory Palestine in the 1920s, the vast majority of production, transmission, distribution, and system management has been carried out by the Israel Electric Corporation (IEC). Over time, IEC transitioned from a public company to a government-owned corporation. In 1967, the East Jerusalem Electric Company (EJEC) received a concession to supply electricity in East Jerusalem, the Bethlehem area, Jericho, and Ramallah. It is the only company, in addition to the IEC, that has been licensed by the Electricity Authority to manage a system for the transmission and distribution of electricity.

During the first decade of the 21st century, the Israeli government initiated attempts to incorporate additional entities into electricity production in Israel, achieving partial success. As part of this effort, the government implemented the electricity sector reform in 2024, aiming to dismantle the existing de facto monopoly in the electricity market in Israel.

== History ==
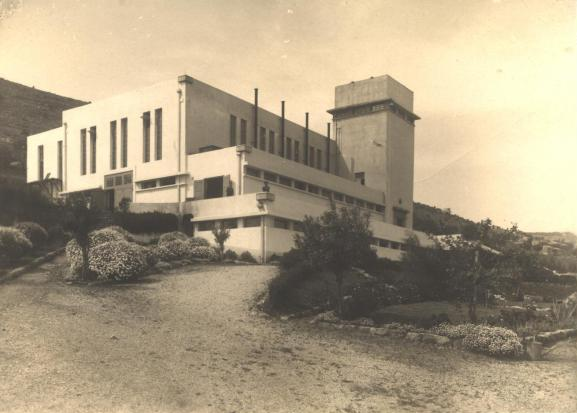
The first power plant to supply electricity to Haifa, and one the first in the whole region. Opened in 1925. Operated on diesel.

Since the founding of Israel through the mid-2010s decade, the state-owned utility, Israel Electric Corporation (IEC) had an effective monopoly on power generation in the country. In 2010 the company sold 52,037 GWh of electricity. Until the mid-2010s the country also faced a persistently low operating reserve, which is mostly the result of Israel being an "electricity island". Most countries have the capability of relying on power drawn from producers in adjacent countries in the event of a power shortage. Israel's grid however, is unconnected to those of neighboring countries. This is mostly due to political reasons but also to the considerably less-developed nature of the power systems of Jordan and Egypt, whose systems constantly struggle to meet domestic demand and whose per-capita electric generation is less than one fifth that of Israel's. Nevertheless, while operating reserves in Israel were low, the country possessed sufficient generation and transmission capacity to meet domestic electricity needs and unlike in the countries surrounding it, rolling blackouts have historically been quite rare, even at periods of extreme demand.

Facing the increasing demand for electricity and concerned about the low reserve situation, the government of Israel began taking steps to increase the supply of electricity and operating reserve, as well to reduce the monopoly position of the IEC and increase competition in the electricity market starting in the second half of the 2000s decade. It instructed the IEC to construct several new power stations and encouraged private investment in the generation sector. By 2015, the IEC's share of total nationwide installed electric generation capacity had fallen to about 75%, with the company then possessing an installed generation capacity of about 13.6 gigawatts (GW). Since 2010, Independent Power Producers have constructed three new gas-fired combined cycle power stations with a total generation capacity of about 2.2 GW, while various industrial concerns constructed on-premises cogeneration facilities with a total electricity output of about 1 GW, and which are licensed by the electric authority to sell surplus electricity to the national grid at competitive rates. Also under construction is a 300 MW pumped storage facility, with two more in planning, plus several solar-powered plants.

In addition to the above steps, Israel and Cyprus are considering implementing the proposed EuroAsia Interconnector project. This consists of laying a 2000MW HVDC undersea power cable between them and between Cyprus and Greece, thus connecting Israel to the greater European power grid. If carried out, this will allow a further increase in the country's operating reserve as well as sell surplus electricity abroad.

In 2016, total nationwide electricity production was 67.2 GWh, of which 55.2% was generated using natural gas and 43.8% using coal — the first time the share of electricity production using natural gas exceeded that generated using coal.

Share of Total Electricity Generation Capacity at Full Output by Plant Type and Fuel Types Used by the IEC in 2010
	Coal	Fuel oil	Natural gas	Diesel
Installed capacity by plant type	39.7%	3.4%	39.8%	18.9%
Total annual generation by fuel source	61.0%	0.9%	36.6%	1.5%

In 2015, energy consumption in Israel was 52.86 TWh, or 6,562 kWh per capita. The Israel Electric Corporation (IEC), which is owned by the government, produces most electricity in Israel, with a production capacity of 11,900 megawatts in 2016. In 2016, IEC's share of the electricity market was 71%.

== Energy sources ==
=== Hydrocarbon fuels ===
Most electricity in Israel comes from hydrocarbon fuels from the following IEC power plants:

Name	Location	Type of turbine	Type of fuel	Capacity (MW) 2017
Orot Rabin	Hadera	Steam	Coal	2,590
Orot Rabin	Hadera	Gas (jet)	Diesel	15
Rutenberg	Ashkelon	Steam	Coal	2,250
Rutenberg	Ashkelon	Gas (jet)	Diesel	40
Eshkol	Ashdod	Steam	Natural gas	912
Eshkol	Ashdod	Gas (jet), combined cycle	Natural gas	771
Eshkol	Ashdod	Gas (jet)	Diesel	10
Reading	Tel Aviv	Steam	Natural gas	428
Haifa	Haifa	Steam	Natural gas	282
Haifa	Haifa	Steam	Natural gas	748
Haifa	Haifa	Gas (jet)	Diesel	80
Eilat	Eilat	Gas (jet and industrial)	Diesel	34
Eitan		Gas (jet)	Diesel, methanol	58
Alon Tavor	Alon Tavor Industrial Zone	Gas (industrial)	Diesel	220
Alon Tavor	Alon Tavor Industrial Zone	Combined cycle	Natural gas	363
Gezer	Ramla	Gas (industrial)	Natural gas	592
Gezer	Ramla	Combined cycle	Natural gas	744
Hartuv		Gas (jet)	Diesel	40
Hagit	Elyakim	Combined cycle	Natural gas	1,394
Kinarot		Gas (jet)	Diesel	80
Atarot		Gas (industrial)	Diesel	68
Tzafit	Kiryat Mal'akhi	Gas (industrial), combined cycle	Natural gas, Diesel	580
Caesarea		Gas (jet)	Diesel	130
Ramat Hovav	Ramat Hovav	Gas (industrial), combined cycle	Natural gas	1,137
Ra'anana	Ra'anana	Gas (jet)	Diesel	11

The following power plants belong to independent power producers and, although connected to the IEC’s distribution grid, are not operated by the IEC:

Name	Location	Type of turbine	Type of fuel	Capacity (MW) 2017
Dorad	Ashkelon	Gas (jet), combined cycle	Natural gas	840
Dalya	Kfar Menahem	Combined cycle	Natural gas	870
OPC Rotem	Mishor Rotem	Combined cycle	Natural gas	440

=== Renewable energy ===

As of 2019, Israel's renewable energy production capacity stood at 1,500 MW, almost all of it from solar energy, at 1,438 MW. Additional sources included wind power (27 MW), biogas (25 MW), hydroelectric power (7 MW) and other bio energy (3 MW). Of the solar energy, photovoltaics accounted for 1,190 MW, while concentrated solar power contributed another 248 MW from the Ashalim Power Station.

In the same year, 4.7% of Israel's total electricity consumption came from solar photovoltaics. Production capacity of some 0.56 GW was installed in 2019.

In addition to renewable energy, Israel is building multiple pumped-storage hydroelectricity plants, for a total capacity of 800 MW.

=== Nuclear energy ===
Israel has no nuclear power generation as of 2013, although it operates a heavy water nuclear reactor at Negev Nuclear Research Center.

In January 2007, Israeli Infrastructure Minister Binyamin Ben-Eliezer said his country should consider producing nuclear power for civilian purposes. However, as a result of the Fukushima nuclear disaster, Prime Minister Benjamin Netanyahu said on 17 March 2011, "I don't think we're going to pursue civil nuclear energy in the coming years."

== See also ==
- Solar power in Israel
- List of power stations in Israel
