= Energy in Israel =

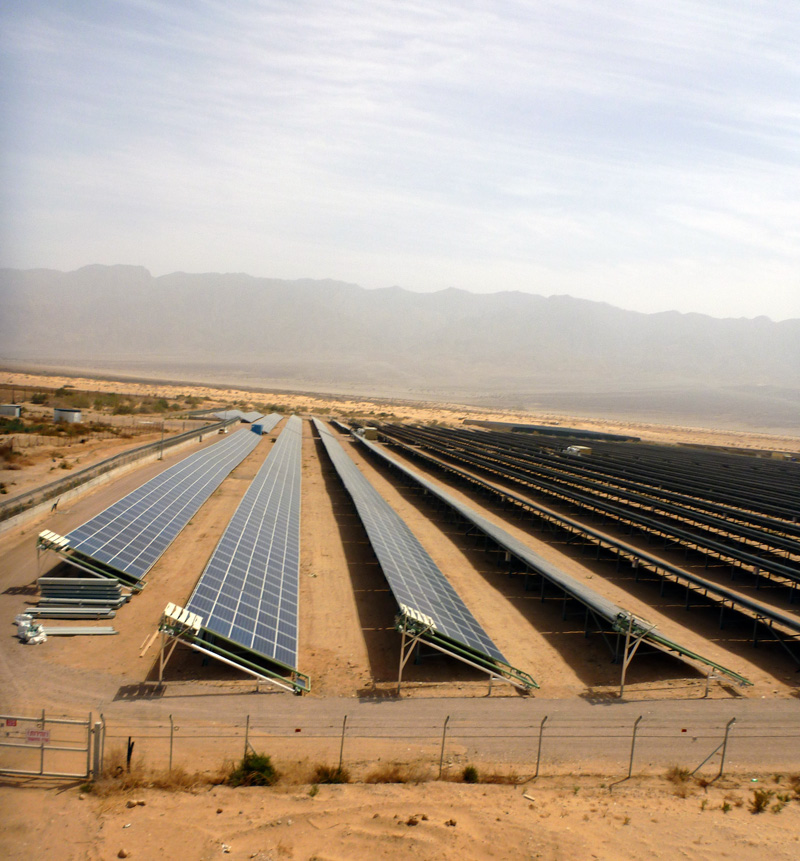
Solar field, Kibbutz Elifaz, Israel

Energy consumption by source, Israel

Most energy in Israel comes from fossil fuels. The country's total primary energy demand is significantly higher than its total primary energy production, relying heavily on imports to meet its energy needs. Total primary energy consumption was 304 TWh (1.037 quad) in 2016, or 26.2 million tonne of oil equivalent.

Electricity consumption in Israel was 57,149 GWh in 2017, while production was 64,675 GWh, with net exports of 4.94 TWh. The installed generating capacity was about 16.25 GW in 2014, almost all from fossil fuel power stations, mostly coal and gas fueled. Renewable energy accounted for a minor share of electricity production, with a small solar photovoltaic installed capacity. However, there are a total of over 1.3 million solar water heaters installed as a result of mandatory solar water heating regulations.

In 2018, 70% of electricity came from natural gas, and 4% from renewables, of which 95% was solar PV.

In 2020, the government committed that by 2030, renewables should reach 30%. This target was further revised in 2021, when Israel pledged at the United Nations Climate Change Conference (COP26) to phasing out coal for energy generation by 2025, and reaching net zero for greenhouse gas emissions by 2050.

The transportation sector has historically relied almost entirely on petroleum derived fuels, as both private motorcars and public transit buses used to overwhelmingly rely on gasoline or diesel - and still do, despite efforts to change this. However, Israel is undertaking a mobility transition which includes the electrification of the Israel Railways network (beginning with the Tel Aviv-Jerusalem railway in 2018) and the construction of Jerusalem light rail (opened 2011), public transit cablecars in Haifa and Tel Aviv light rail. In 2018 Israel set the target date for the phase-out of fossil fuel vehicles (i.e. an end to future sales of new fossil fuel powered vehicles) for 2030.

== History ==
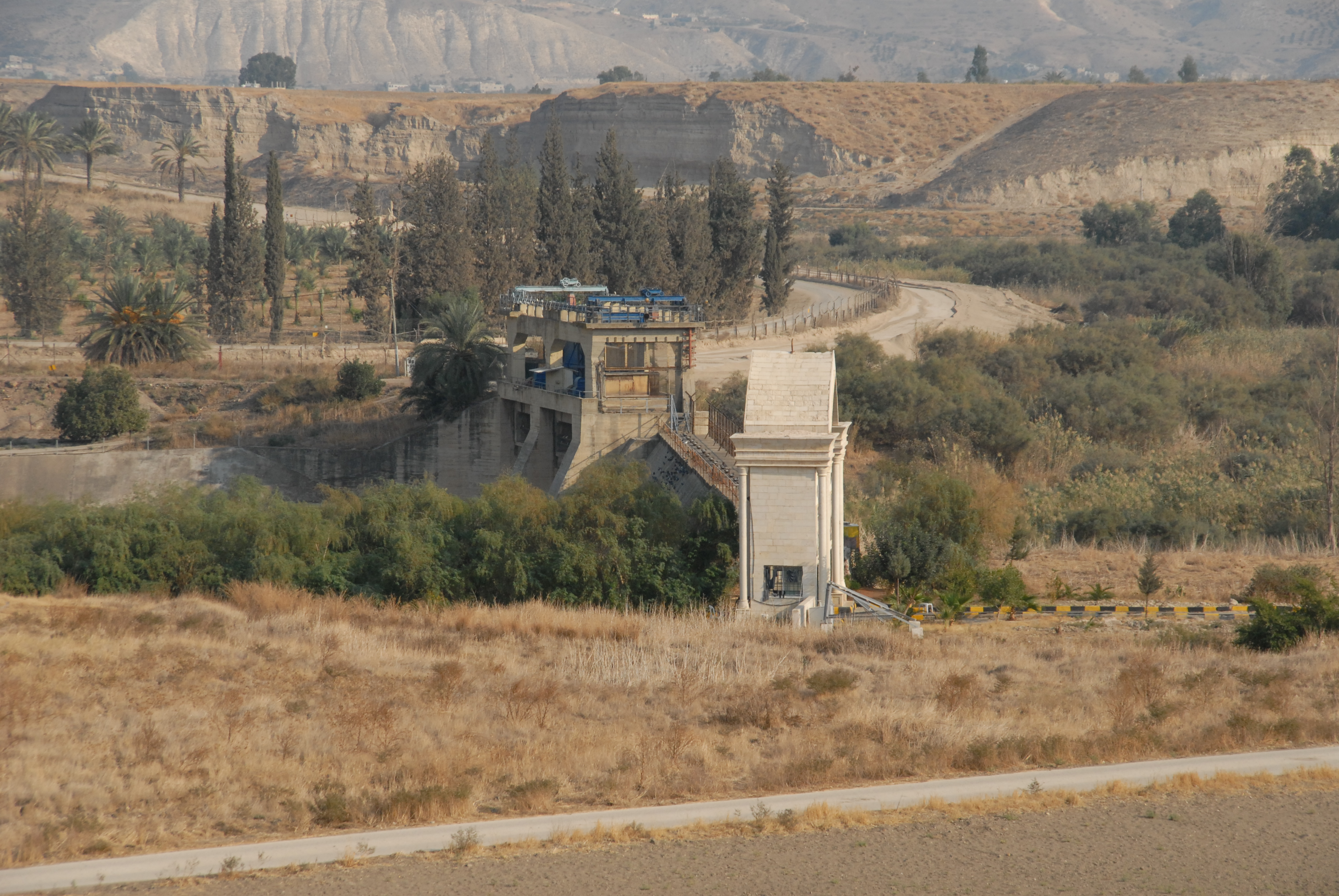
Pinhas Rutenberg's power station, Naharayim

Throughout Israel's history, securing the energy supply had been a major concern of Israeli policymakers. The Israel Electric Corporation, which traces its history to 1923, with the First Jordan Hydro-Electric Power House, is the main electricity generator and distributor in Israel.

Petroleum exploration began in 1947 on a surface feature in the Heletz area in the southern coastal plain. The first discovery, Heletz-I, was completed in 1955, followed by the discovery and development of a few small wells in Kokhav, Brur, Ashdod and Zuk Tamrur in 1957. The combined Heletz-Brur-Kokhav field produced a total of 17.2 million barrels, a negligible amount compared with national consumption. Since the early 1950s, 480 oil and gas wells, land and offshore were drilled in Israel, most of which did not result in commercial success. In 1958–1961, several small gas fields were discovered in the southern Judean desert. From the Six-Day War until the Egyptian Separation Treaty in 1975, Israel produced large quantities of petroleum from the Abu Rodes oil field in Sinai.

In 1951, the Arab states accused American oil interests in Saudi Arabia of selling oil to Central American governments who circumvented the Arab blockade against Israel by selling the oil back to the refinery in Haifa.

Solar power in Israel has been the main renewable energy resource used in Israel since the 1950s, at first mostly for solar water heaters. Photovoltaics has only reached commercial scale in Israel in the 21st century but has since grown rapidly.

In 2021, Prime Minister Naftali Bennet committed Israel at the United Nations Climate Change Conference (COP26) to phasing out coal for energy generation by 2025, and reaching net zero for greenhouse gas emissions by 2050.

== Primary energy ==
=== Natural gas ===
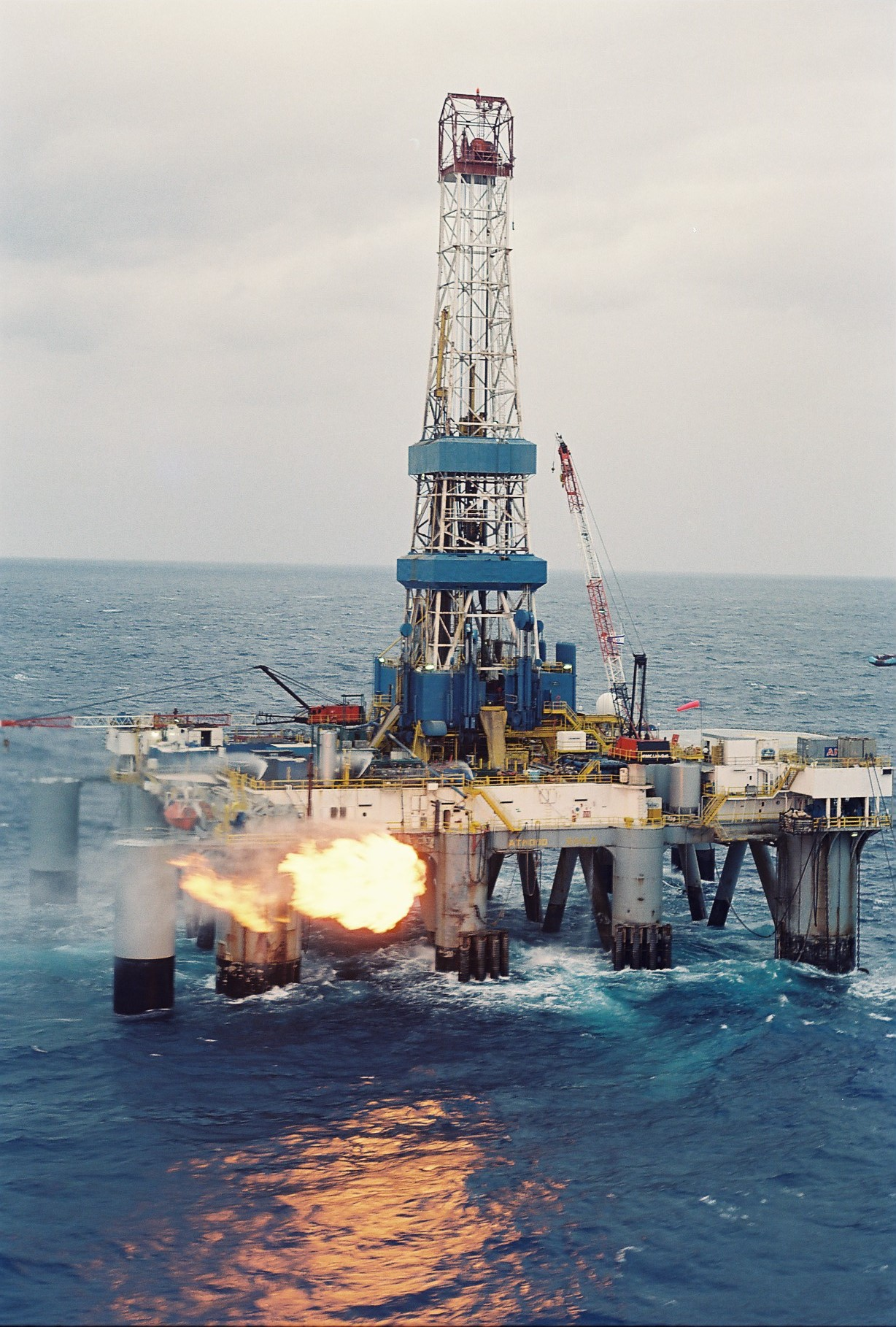
Drilling for natural gas in the Mediterranean, Noa gas field

Since Israel’s creation in 1948, it has been dependent on energy imports from other countries. Specifically, Israel produced 7 billion cubic meters of natural gas in 2013, and imported 720 million cubic meters in 2011. Historically, Israel has imported natural gas through the Arish-Ashkelon pipeline from Egypt. Egypt is the second-largest natural gas producer in North Africa. In 2005 Egypt signed a 2.5 billion-dollar deal to supply Israel with 57 billion cubic feet of gas per year for fifteen years. Under this arrangement, Egypt supplies 40 percent of Israel's natural gas demand. The Israeli Electric Corporation (IEC) controls more than 95% of the electricity sector in Israel, and controls production, distribution, and transmission of electricity. The IEC has a natural gas distribution law which regulates the distribution of natural gas in Israel to empower market competition.

The discoveries of the Tamar gas field in 2009 and the Leviathan gas field in 2010 off the coast of Israel were important. The natural gas reserves in these two fields (Leviathan has around 19 trillion cubic feet) could make Israel more energy secure. In 2013 Israel began commercial production of natural gas from the Tamar field and in 2019 from Leviathan. As of 2017, even by conservative estimates, Leviathan holds enough gas to meet Israel's domestic needs for 40 years.

In addition, the Karish gas field started production in 2022 after Israel reached an agreement with Lebanon that ended a maritime border dispute between the two.

=== Petroleum ===
Israel's oil production has always been much less than domestic consumption. As of 2023, Israel's petroleum production was quoted as 15 000 barrels per day.

Mandatory Palestine imported oil from northern Iraq via the Kirkuk–Haifa oil pipeline, but this route was cut by the Arab-Israeli War of 1948. Since 1975, the United States stocks a strategic oil reserve for Israel.

An analysis published in 2024 found that the largest supplier of crude oil to Israel was Azerbaijan (via the Baku-Tbilisi-Ceyhan pipeline). Other significant suppliers were Gabon, Kazakhstan, Russia and Brazil.

Regarding refined products, Israel has two refineries: BAZAN in Haifa, which is the largest, and Paz Oil in Ashdod.

== Electricity ==
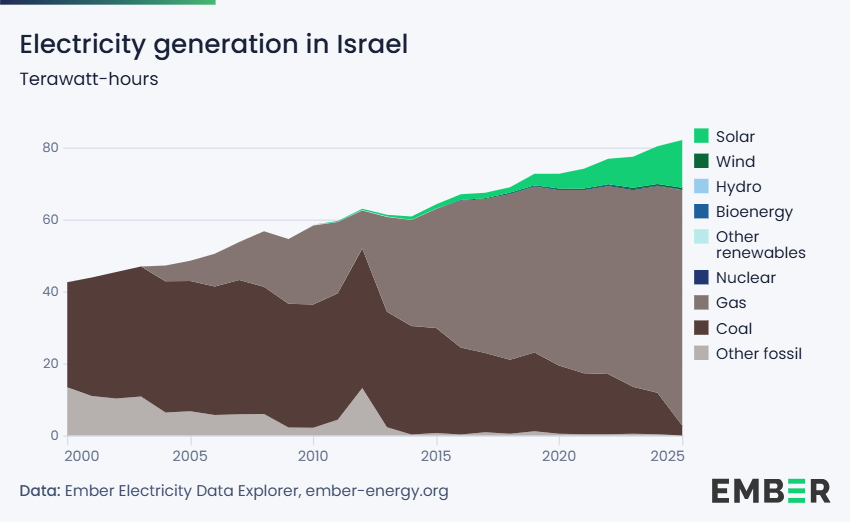
Electricity generation in Israel in terawatt-hours

Israel's electricity sector relies mainly on fossil fuels. In 2015, energy consumption in Israel was 52.86 TWh, or 6,562 kWh per capita. The Israel Electric Corporation (IEC), which is owned by the government, produces most electricity in Israel, with a production capacity of 11,900 megawatts in 2016. In 2016, IEC's share of the electricity market was 71%.

=== Hydrocarbon fuels ===
Most electricity in Israel comes from hydrocarbon fuels from the following IEC power plants:

Name	Location	Type of turbine	Type of fuel	Capacity (MW) 2017
Orot Rabin	Hadera	Steam	Coal	2,590
Orot Rabin	Hadera	Gas (jet)	Diesel	15
Rutenberg	Ashkelon	Steam	Coal	2,250
Rutenberg	Ashkelon	Gas (jet)	Diesel	40
Eshkol	Ashdod	Steam	Natural gas	912
Eshkol	Ashdod	Gas (jet), combined cycle	Natural gas	771
Eshkol	Ashdod	Gas (jet)	Diesel	10
Reading	Tel Aviv	Steam	Natural gas	428
Haifa	Haifa	Steam	Natural gas	282
Haifa	Haifa	Steam	Natural gas	748
Haifa	Haifa	Gas (jet)	Diesel	80
Eilat	Eilat	Gas (jet and industrial)	Diesel	34
Eitan		Gas (jet)	Diesel, methanol	58
Alon Tavor	Alon Tavor Industrial Zone	Gas (industrial)	Diesel	220
Alon Tavor	Alon Tavor Industrial Zone	Combined cycle	Natural gas	363
Gezer	Ramla	Gas (industrial)	Natural gas	592
Gezer	Ramla	Combined cycle	Natural gas	744
Hartuv		Gas (jet)	Diesel	40
Hagit	Elyakim	Combined cycle	Natural gas	1,394
Kinarot		Gas (jet)	Diesel	80
Atarot		Gas (industrial)	Diesel	68
Tzafit	Kiryat Mal'akhi	Gas (industrial), combined cycle	Natural gas, Diesel	580
Caesarea		Gas (jet)	Diesel	130
Ramat Hovav	Ramat Hovav	Gas (industrial), combined cycle	Natural gas	1,137
Ra'anana	Ra'anana	Gas (jet)	Diesel	11

The following power plants belong to independent power producers and, although connected to the IEC’s distribution grid, are not operated by the IEC:

Name	Location	Type of turbine	Type of fuel	Capacity (MW) 2017
Dorad	Ashkelon	Gas (jet), combined cycle	Natural gas	840
Dalya	Kfar Menahem	Combined cycle	Natural gas	870
OPC Rotem	Mishor Rotem	Combined cycle	Natural gas	440

=== Renewable energy ===

As of 2019, Israel's renewable energy production capacity stood at 1,500 MW, almost all of it from solar energy, at 1,438 MW. Additional sources included wind power (27 MW), biogas (25 MW), hydroelectric power (7 MW) and other bio energy (3 MW). Of the solar energy, photovoltaics accounted for 1,190 MW, while concentrated solar power contributed another 248 MW from the Ashalim Power Station.

In the same year, 4.7% of Israel's total electricity consumption came from solar photovoltaics. Production capacity of some 0.56 GW was installed in 2019.

In addition to renewable energy, Israel is building multiple pumped-storage hydroelectricity plants, for a total capacity of 800 MW.

In 2022, 11.8% of Israel's energy mix came from renewable energy sources, totaling 4,765 MW in renewable energy production capacity. The vast majority of Israel's renewable sources come from solar power, including from the Tze'elim, Ketura Sun, Ashalim Power Station, the 330 MW Dimona, and 250 MW Ta'anakh solar parks.

Officials from the Israeli Government and The Electricity Authority have given the goal to reach 30% of the country's energy from renewable sources by 2030. Despite this goal, a May 2023 OECD report warned Israel was falling behind on its emissions reduction objectives, largely due to natural gas extraction.

In June 2023, Israel's largest renewable energy project, Enlight Renewable Energy's Genesis Wind, began operations near the Israeli villages of Keshet and Yonatan in the Golan Heights. The new wind farm is 207MW, will provide 70,000 households with clean energy, has a 27 kilometer HV 161 kV underground cable, and will save about 180,000 tons of annual CO_{2} emissions.

In 2023, citing lack of land for ground solar PV parks, Israel mandated that all newly constructed commercial buildings install rooftop photovoltaic solar panels. In September 2023, Israel added more than 2 GW to the national energy grid to connect renewable energy projects, specifically solar, to the grid.

=== Nuclear energy ===
Israel has no nuclear power generation as of 2013, although it operates a heavy water nuclear reactor at Negev Nuclear Research Center.

In January 2007, Israeli Infrastructure Minister Binyamin Ben-Eliezer said his country should consider producing nuclear power for civilian purposes. However, as a result of the Fukushima nuclear disaster, Prime Minister Benjamin Netanyahu said on 17 March 2011, "I don't think we're going to pursue civil nuclear energy in the coming years."

== Solar water heating ==
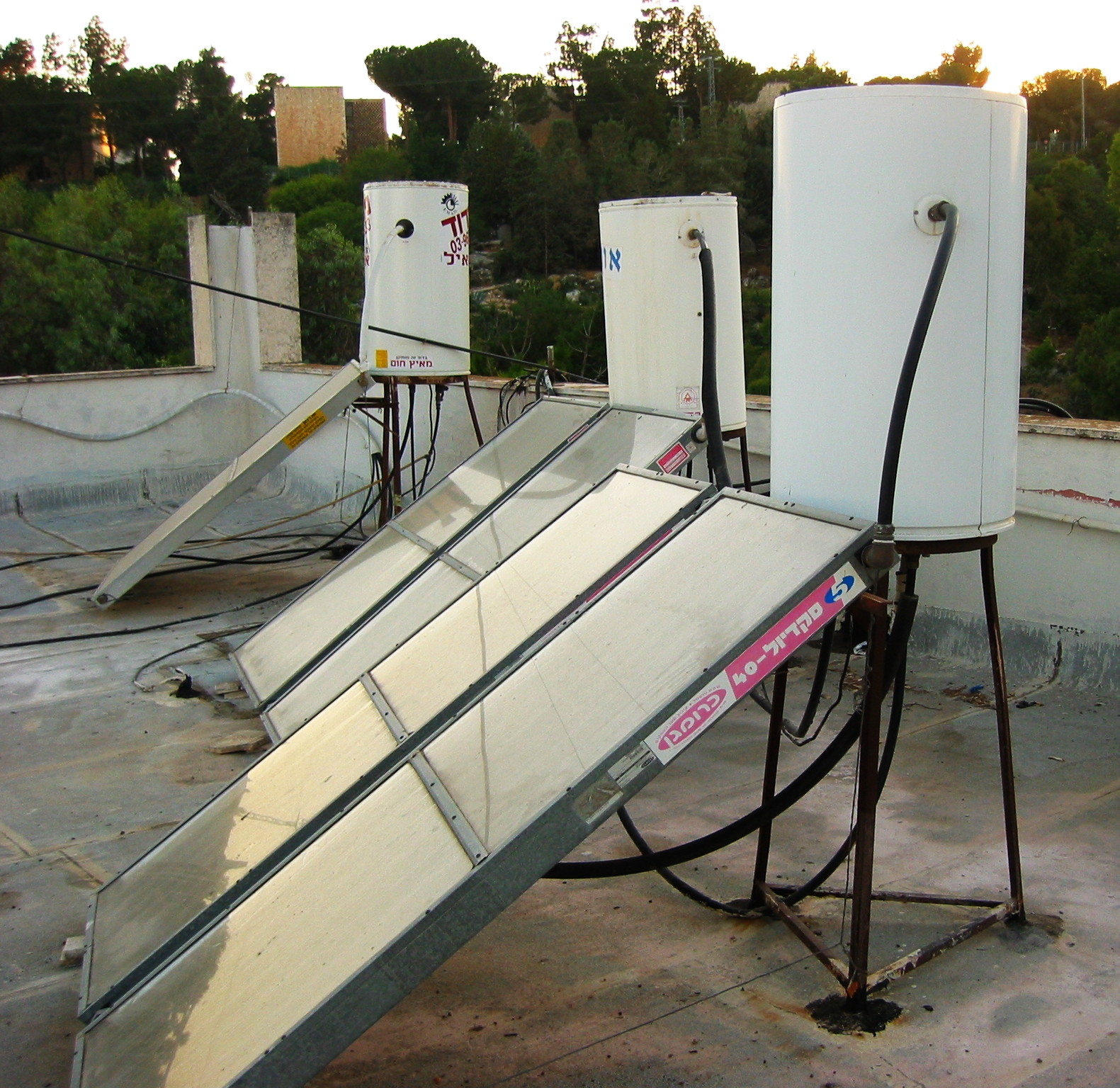
Roof-top solar boilers in Jerusalem

Israel is one of the world leaders in the use of solar thermal energy per capita. Since the early 1990s, all new residential buildings have been required by the government to install solar water-heating systems, and Israel's National Infrastructure Ministry estimates that solar panels for water-heating satisfy 4% of the country's total energy demand. Israel and Cyprus are the per-capita leaders in the use of solar hot water systems with over 90% of homes using them. The Ministry of National Infrastructures estimates solar water heating saves Israel 2 million barrels (320,000 m^{3}) of oil a year.

== See also ==
- List of power stations in Israel
