= List of power stations in Israel =

Location of power stations in Israel: gas, coal

The following is a list of the power stations in Israel.

== Coal ==
Name	Location	Capacity (MW)	Commissioned	Refs
Orot Rabin	Hadera	2,590		
Rutenberg	Ashkelon	2,250		

Orot Rabin is since 2016 in the process of being converted to natural gas (see article).

== Gas ==
Name	Location	Capacity (MW)	Commissioned	Refs
Dorad	Southern Ashkelon	800	2013–2014	
Gezer	Ramla, Israel	1332	1998–2008	
Hagit	En Tut Interchange, Highway 6, southern foot of Mount Carmel	1030	1996–2007	
Mishor Rotem	Mishor Rotem	440	2013	
Ramat Hovav	Ne'ot Hovav	520	1989–1999	
Tzafit	Kfar Menahem	595	1991–2012	
Dalia	Kfar Menahem	860	2015	

== Proposed ==
Name	Location	Capacity (MW)	Commissioned	Refs
Kesem	Rosh HaAyin	780 MW	Pre-construction (2023)	
Shimshon	Beit Shemesh	Est. 830 MW		

== Solar ==
- Ashalim power station
- Ketura Sun
- Neot Hovav
- Tze'elim

== Pumped storage hydroelectricity ==
- Kokhav Hayarden Pumped Storage Power Station

== See also ==
- Shimon Peres Negev Nuclear Research Center, aka the Dimona reactor
- Energy in Israel
- List of largest power stations in the world
