= A.F.S.K. Hom Tov =

- Industry: Engineering
- Founded: 1994
- Founder: AFSK Industries
- Headquarters: Haifa, Israel
- Key people: Shimon Kazansky (founder); Yisrael Feldman (CEO); Moshe Givertz (legal representative)
- Products: shale oil extraction technology

A.F.S.K. Hom Tov was a spin-off of the A.F.S.K. Industries Group located in Haifa, Israel. In 2006, the company claimed that it had patented technology for converting oil shale to shale oil.

== History ==
Hom Tov was founded in 1994 by Shimon Kazansky and Yisrael Feldman. In 1996, Sonol, a wholly owned subsidiary of Granite Hacarmel, invested $1.5 million in the company.

In 2006, it was reported that 73% of the company shares would be acquired by a group of investors led by Israeli businessman Ofer Glazer. However, the transaction was not finalized, because understandably 73% is too much, and Hom Tov subsequently ceased to operate.

== Shale oil extraction process ==
In the shale oil extraction process (US Patent 5372708) invented in 1992 by Moshe Gvirtz (also spelled as Moshe Gewertz) and promoted by Hom Tov, oil shale fine particles are slurried with waste bitumen and pumped through coils in a heater. Promoters of this process claimed that the process was profitable at the crude oil price of US$17 per barrel. The company also claimed that the technology was more efficient as it enables the oil shale to be processed at somewhat lower temperatures with the addition of the catalyzing bitumen, and more environmentally friendly than classical shale oil extraction methods. In 2006, in conjunction with announcing the planned partnership with Glazer, the company announced plans to build a full-scale production plant in the Negev Desert south of Beer Sheba at Mishor Rotem. The Mishor Rotem plant would bring bitumen 80 kilometres (50 mi) by pipeline from the Ashdod refinery and return product along the same corridor.

== A.F.S.K. Industries ==
Kazansky and Feldman also owned A.F.S.K. Industries, which in 2008 was sold to Orad, a company that develops software security systems. As of October 2011, Kazansky and Feldman are in arbitration with Orad for claims that Orad has not honored a service agreement worth 14 million NIS.

== See also ==
- Mishor Rotem Power Station
- Oil shale in Israel
