= Dalia Energy Companies =

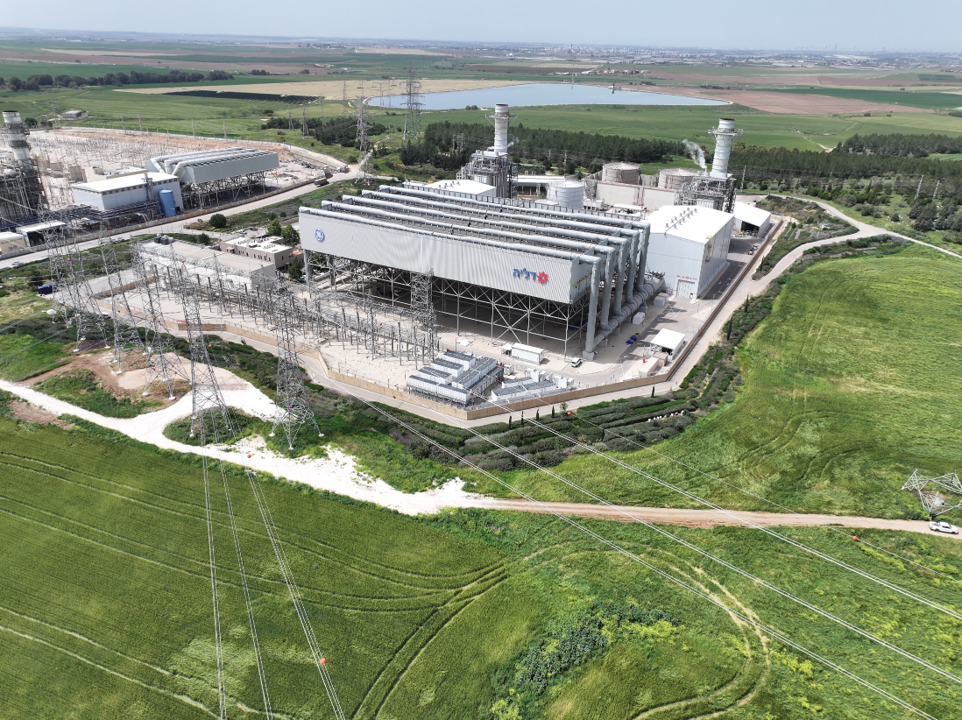
- Dalya Power Station
- Company type: energy
- Industry: Electric utilities
- Founded: 2020; 6 years ago
- Headquarters: Tel Aviv, Israel
- Area served: Israel
- Key people: Doron Set (chairman); Oved Debi (CEO)
- Products: Electricity generation
- Revenue: NIS 2.284 billion (2023)
- Operating income: NIS 371 million (2023)
- Total equity: NIS 1.08 billion (2023)
- Website: www.dalia-power.co.il

Dalia Energy Companies Ltd. is an Israeli company engaged in the development, construction and operation of electricity supply stations, along with electricity generation and storage. The company operates advanced power plants based on natural gas, including Dalia power station at the Tzafit site that generates approx 900 megawatts using combined cycle technology, and Eshkol power station in Ashdod that generates a total of 1,606 megawatts. Dalia is one of the largest private electricity producers in Israel, and it played a significant role in opening the electricity market to competition with an installed capacity of approx. 2,600 megawatts.

== History ==
Dalia Power Energies Ltd. was established in July 2005 following the Israeli Electricity Sector Law of 1988, which stipulated that the government-owned electricity company would no longer build new power plants. The company was established through the initiative of a group of private entrepreneurs with the aim of promoting competition in the Israeli electricity market. In 2010, Dalia power station was declared as a "national infrastructure project"; its construction was completed in 2015.

Dalia's name was selected due to the planned location of the first power station near the mouth of the river Dalia in the Carmel region. However, the National Infrastructure Committee subsequently changed its decision and the station was built in the Yoav Regional Council, near the old power plant of the Israel Electricity Company in Tzafit, and adjacent to Israel's gas and electricity transmission line network.

Dalia Energy Companies Ltd. was established in October 2020, and received full ownership of Dalia Power Energies Ltd.

In March 2022, Dalia Energy Companies bonds were listed for trading on the Tel Aviv Stock Exchange.

In November 2023, as part of a privatization process, Dalia Energy Companies acquired the Eshkol power station, after it was owned by the Israel Electric Corporation. The power station, located in Ashdod, is equipped with advanced technology and a production capacity of 1,606 megawatts. The transaction, which was carried out at a cost of NIS 9 billion, was financed mostly by Bank Hapoalim and Mizrahi-Tefahot Bank.

== Power generation projects ==
=== Dalia power station ===
The construction of Dalia power station began in 2012 near Kibbutz Kfar Menahem, and was completed in 2015. Its location near the IEC power plant and Israel's gas transmission lines provides the ability to transport electricity across Israel, as well as allows for the expansion of the electricity production scope in Dalia and its delivery to demand areas throughout the country.

Upon its establishment in 2015, Dalia power station became the largest private power plant in Israel, supplying approximately 7% of the country's total electricity demand. Dalia operates using combined cycle technology that includes a gas turbine and a steam turbine, thus achieving an exceptionally high energy efficiency of 58%. The power station generates 912 megawatts of electricity produced from natural gas (with diesel acting as a backup fuel).

The company has been selling electricity to business customers since 2015 and, starting in 2023, to households as well.

In 2023, Dalia expanded its production activity and constructed a lithium-ion technology-based energy storage facility with two floors and a storage capacity of 88 megawatts per hour. In 2024, the facility was connected to the national transmission grid according to the market model.

Dalia power station was constructed by GE with a unique design and a combination of advanced technologies that contribute to clean and efficient electricity production.

==== Dalia 2 ====
In December 2024, the company signed a memorandum of understanding with Bank Leumi and Discount Bank to provide financing of NIS 4.25 billion for the construction of "Dalia 2", a new electricity generation facility at the Tzafit site, with a capacity of 630 to 900 megawatts. The planned station will be based on an advanced H-type gas turbine, offering energy efficiency of 63% – one of the highest in Israel.

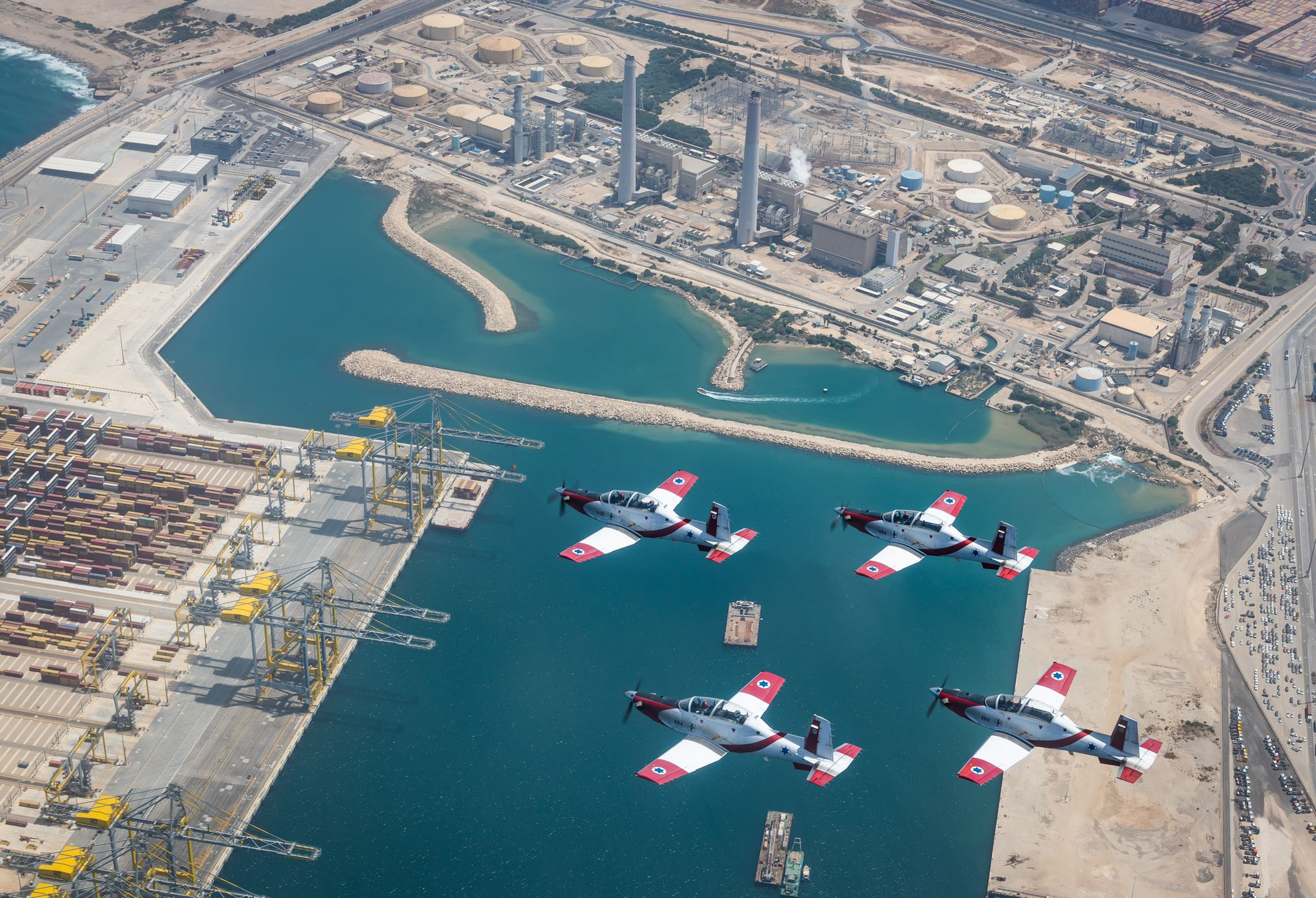
Aerial photograph of the Eshkol power plant in Ashdod

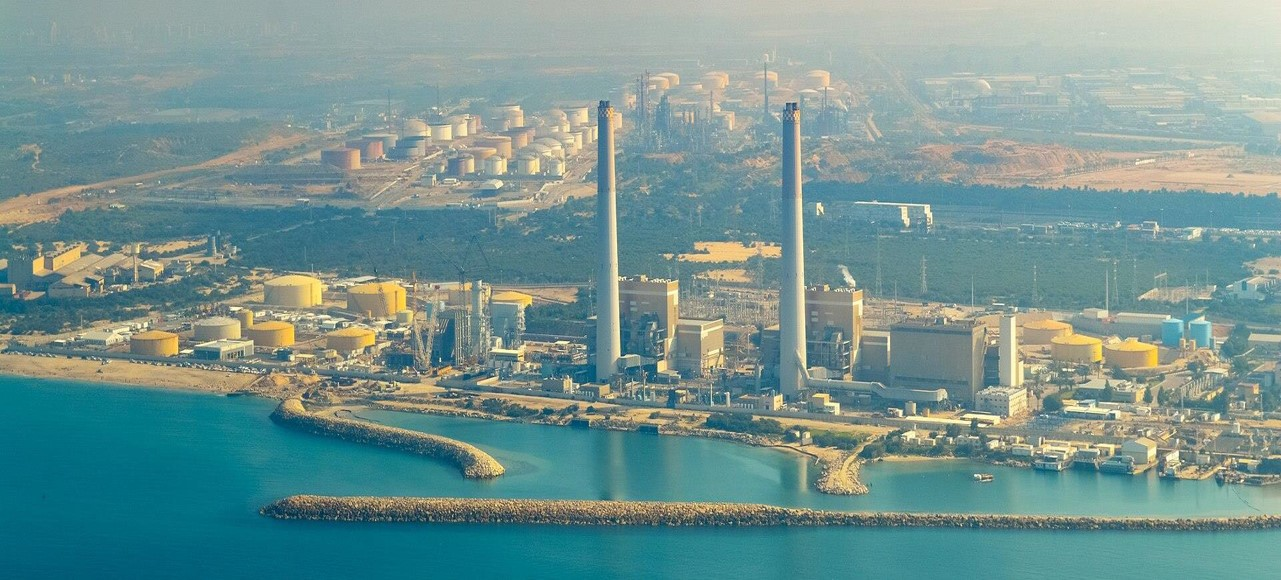
Eshkol Power Station aerial

=== Eshkol power station ===
The Eshkol power station, built in the 1960s, is considered one of the oldest and most important stations in Israel. In November 2023, Dalia Energy Companies acquired the Eshkol power plant from the Israel Electric Corporation as part of a privatization process. The station, located in Ashdod, is equipped with advanced technology and a generation capacity of 1,606 megawatts.

On June 3, 2024, the ownership of the station was transferred to Eshkol Power Energies in exchange for approximately NIS 9 billion. The bulk of the financing for this transaction, totaling NIS 6 billion, was provided as a loan from Bank Hapoalim (70%) and Mizrahi-Tefahot Bank (30%).

The station has old steam turbines that are scheduled for scrapping, and in their place a new power plant will be constructed with a production capacity of 850 megawatts and large energy storage facilities. The new power station will be named Avshal, after Avshalom Haran, who was a director at Dalia that led the completion of the Dalia power station. The power plant is scheduled to begin commercial operation in 2029.
