= Oil shale in Israel =

Overview of the industry in Israel

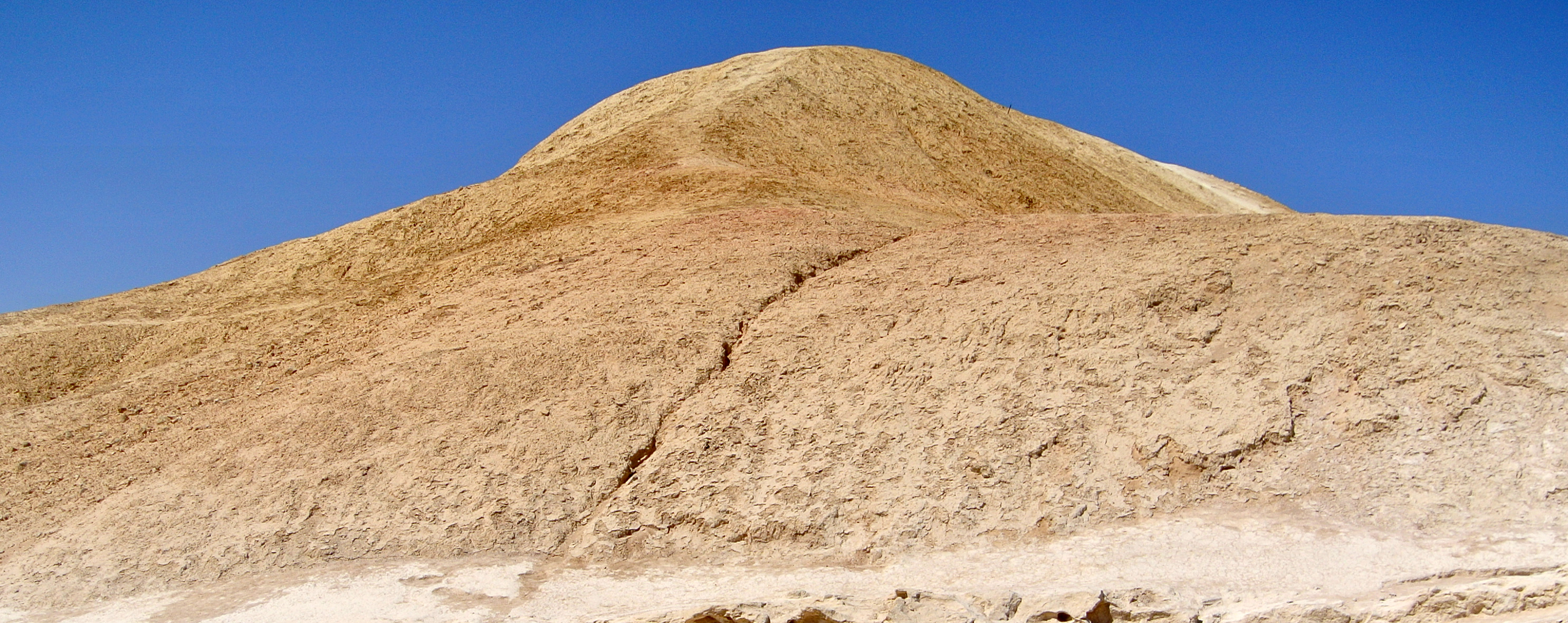
Ghareb Formation (an Upper Cretaceous oil shale) in Wadi Hawarim, southern Israel

Oil shale in Israel is widespread but an undeveloped resource, largely because of economic and technological constraints. Israeli oil shales belong to the group of Upper Cretaceous marinite deposits. Although oil-shale deposits may lie under as much as 15% of the country, only a small part of these are mineable. According to the Geological Survey of Israel, deposits that could have the biggest economic potential are located in the northern Negev, the largest being the Rotem-Yamin formation. For several decades, oil shale was used for small-scale power generation at Mishor Rotem. Several Israeli companies have proposed shale oil extraction; testing of the viability of the oil shale industry is currently being undertaken by Israel Energy Initiatives. However, as of 2011, there are no commercial oil shale operations in Israel.

== Resource ==
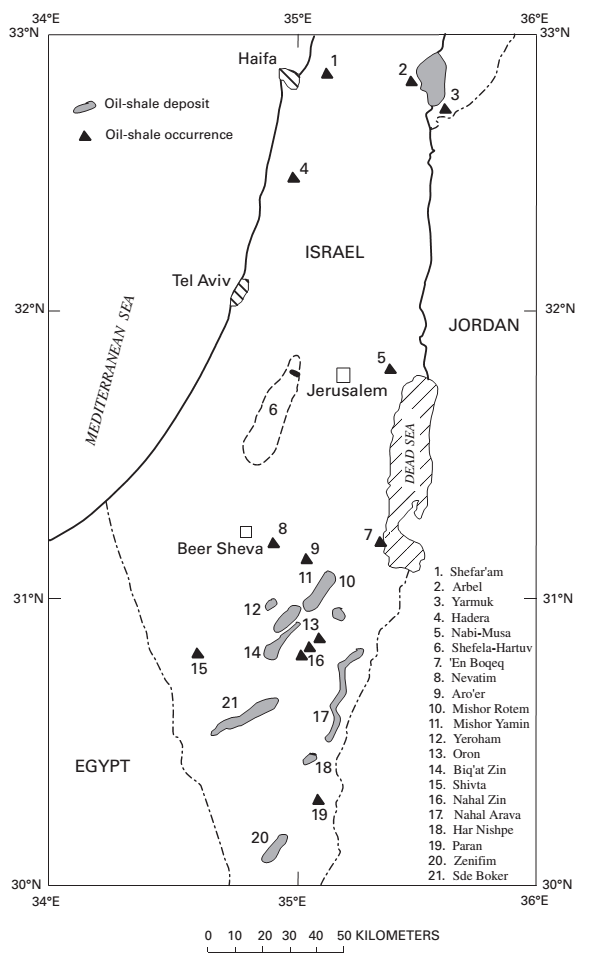
Oil shale deposits in Israel

Oil shale in Israel is Upper Cretaceous marinite, which kerogen is most-likely formed from marine phytoplankton. According to government agencies in Israel, oil shale within the nation is not at present a viable energy resource, given currently available technologies. Further study and analysis are needed to determine the full potential.

Oil shale deposits cover approximately 15% of Israel, mainly in the northern and central parts of the country. There are more than 30 known occurrences of oil shale. The theoretical total reserves are estimated to be about 300 billion tonnes. However, only a few billion tonnes are thought to be recoverable in practical terms through open-pit mining. The main resources are located in the north of the Negev desert. The principle economic potential have the Mishash and the Ghareb formations in northern Negev. As a source for hydrocarbon production, particular interest is oil shales in Dead Sea graben area. The largest deposit is Rotem-Yamin (Mishor Rotem and Mishor Yamin occurrences). Other larger deposits are Sde Boker, Nahal Zin, Zenifim, Shefela-Hartuv, Oron, Nabi Musa, En Boqeq, and Yeroham. According to Tsevi Minster of the Geological Survey of Israel, the largest oil shale occurrence may be Shefela.

The thickness of oil shale formations vary from 30 to 450 metres (98 to 1,476 ft); maximum thickness of the Ghareb Formation in the northern Negev is 130 metres (430 ft). The oil shale in Israel is carbonate-rich consisting of 65 to 80% chalk and marl, and 2–15% clays. Its moisture is up to 20%. Organic content is about 9–15% and sulfur 10–15%. It yields about 40–100 litres (8.8–22.0 imp gal; 11–26 US gal) of shale oil per one metric ton of oil shale. By mineral composition, Israeli oil shale is similar to oil shale in Jordan.

== History ==
An oil shale-fired power plant at Mishor Rotem was commissioned in 1978. In 1978–1981, a 100 kW pilot oil shale-fired power plant was operated. Between 1982 and 1986, the PAMA company, a subsidiary of the Israel Electric Corporation, established and operated a 1 MW pilot plant, which used the fluidized bed combustion technology. The 13 MW demonstration plant was completed in 1989. After 2000, the power station was operated by the Rotem Amfert, a subsidiary of Israel Chemicals. The plant was closed in April, 2011. Israel Chemicals announced that it was closing the plant because it made negligible profits and because it was better to close the plant rather than cause future damage to the environment.

Bustan, an Israeli non-governmental organization, reported that Israel considered purchasing oil shale processing technology from Russia's Technopromexport in 1999. The project was not implemented. Bustan also reported that Pittsburgh-based MidAtlantic Energy Group considered a project to build a 150 MW oil shale-fired power plant at Mishor Rotem. Also this project was not implemented.

In 2006, A.F.S.K. Hom Tov announced a plan to build a small (1–2 tonne/h) test plant in Haifa before building a full scale production plant at Mishor Rotem. The company envisioned bringing bitumen 80 kilometres (50 mi) by pipeline from the Ashdod refinery and returning product along the same corridor. However, the plan was not implemented, and Hom Tov subsequently ceased to operate.

In July 2011, Israel Energy Initiatives, a subsidiary of Genie Energy, received a one-year extension of its three year exclusive license to explore oil shale resources on 238 square kilometres (92 sq mi) in Israel's Shfela region. The project is suspended. In May 2011, the Russian energy company Inter RAO announced that it had received a license to develop oil shale resources in the Negev desert. The company was said to be planning an oil extraction plant and a 150 MW oil shale-fired power plant. The license ended on 9 April 2012 and was not renewed.

Other companies having exploration licenses are Rotem Amfert Negev, Alderamin Holdings and Northwood Exploration Israel at the Mishom Rotem region, and Shapir Civil Engineering at the Oron region. Northwood Exploration Israel, owned by the Casella family, operates through limited partnership Rotem Energy. Its license covers about 245 million tonnes of oil shale containing about 135 million barrels (21,500,000 cubic metres) of shale oil. It plans to build a Galoter-type oil extraction plant with annual capacity of 800,000–900,000 barrels (130,000–140,000 cubic metres) of shale oil, and a 15 MW oil shale-fired power plant.

== Environmental protests ==
Oil-shale development in Israel has caused protests among environmental organisations. In 2006, the Israeli-Palestinian NGO Bustan opposed the development by A.F.S.K. Hom Tov due to environmental impact. Since the announcement in 2011 by IEI to develop shale-oil extraction in Israel, these project have been opposed by inhabitants of Adullam who formed Citizens' Committee to Save Adullam, and different environmental organizations and protest groups such as Greenpeace, Israel Union for Environmental Defense, Life and Environment, Society for the Protection of Nature in Israel, and the U.S.-based Green Zionist Alliance. Main concerns of protesters have been increased greenhouse gas emissions, on-site storage of hazardous materials that could potentially infiltrate ground water, risk of other pollutants, drilling of multiple boreholes and altering the land for decades.
