= Yellow (convenience store) =

Israeli chain of convenience stores

- Type: Subsidiary
- Founded: 1999; 27 years ago
- Headquarters: Yakum, Israel,
- Key people: Avraham Bigger (Chairman); Nir Stern (CEO)
- Parent: Paz Oil Company Ltd.
- Website: https://www.yellow.co.il

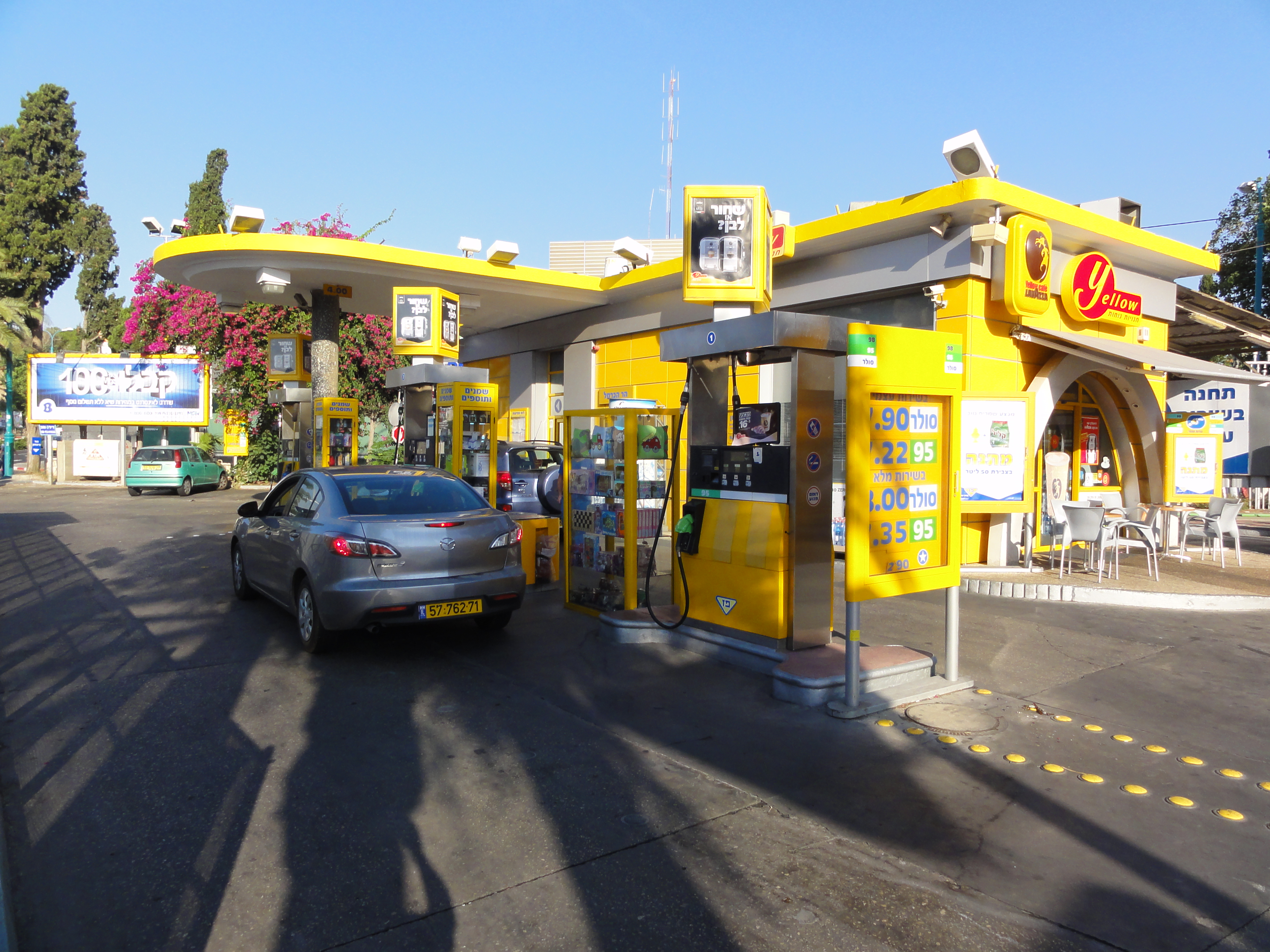
Paz filling station in Haifa with Yellow store

Yellow (Hebrew: יילו) is an Israeli chain of convenience stores owned by Paz Oil Company Ltd. and established in 1999. As of 2021, the chain operates about 280 convenience stores throughout Israel. Most stores operate 24 hours a day, seven days a week. They mainly sell food-to-go (coffee, sandwiches, snacks, soft drinks, etc.) and food for complementary purchases. Like with other convenience stores, the products are priced slightly higher than at grocery stores and supermarkets to account for the convenience of immediate availability.

== History ==
=== Background ===
Major companies operating convenience stores in Israel: Paz with the Yellow brand, Delek with the Menta brand, Sonol with the Sogood brand, Dor Alon with the Alonit and Si Espresso brands, Sadash with the Mon Cheri brand, Ten with the Ten Plus brand, Mika with the Mika brand, and Tapuz with the Tapuz brand. As of 2012, these companies operated approximately 720 convenience stores throughout Israel. In the 2000s, there were only about 120 convenience stores in Israel. Dor Alon was the pioneer in the field. When ‘Super Alonit’ branches opened (mini-markets inside their gas stations), Dor Alon had the largest number of such stores, until 2004.

=== Timeline ===
- 1999 – The first Yellow store was established at a gas station at the Beit Kama Junction.
- 2003 – The chain doubled in size and had 57 stores.
- 2004 – The chain used the one-stop shop concept and expanded its products to services such as ATMs and non-food items.
- 2005 – Yellow reached 115 stores, and expanded its services to complementary products (milk, bread, etc.). That year, a new format called Yellow Market was launched. It is a 24/7 neighborhood mini-market, which includes a wide range of products from fresh Vegetables to baby Diapers. As of 2014, there were 14 Yellow Market stores.
- 2006 – The chain had grown to 155 stores, new products and services were added, including Wi-Fi, over-the-counter medications, gift cards, and more. At the same time, a fresh food category was launched, as well as a joint credit card for Paz and Shufersal.
- 2007 – The fresh food category was expanded to include products unique to the chain.
- 2009 – The private label Yellow Fun to Go was launched.
- 2010 – The chain became a member of the Italian coffee brand Lavazza. "Coffee to-go" stores were launched and the chain began to sell home Coffeemakers.
- 2011 – The company launched a mobile app which included Israel's first mobile customer club and a road service portal for drivers.
- 2014 – The chain embarked on a joint venture with Falafel Baribua to open its stores next to or inside Yellow stores.
