= Paz Oil Company =

Israeli energy company

Paz Oil Company פז חברת הנפט
- Type: Public
- Traded as: TASE: PZOL
- Industry: Energy, Retail
- Founded: 1922; 104 years ago
- Headquarters: Yakum, Israel
- Key people: Zadik Bino, Owner; Yona Fogel, CEO
- Products: Petroleum, Petrochemical
- Revenue: ▲₪ 12.690 billion (2009)
- Operating income: ▲₪ 785 million (2009)
- Net income: ▲₪ 575 million (2009)
- Number of employees: 2000~ (2009)
- Divisions: Refining and Logistics; Retail and Wholesale; Industries and Services
- Subsidiaries: Yellow; Paz Ashdod Refinery; Pazgas; Paz Solar; Paz Aviation
- Website: www.paz.co.il

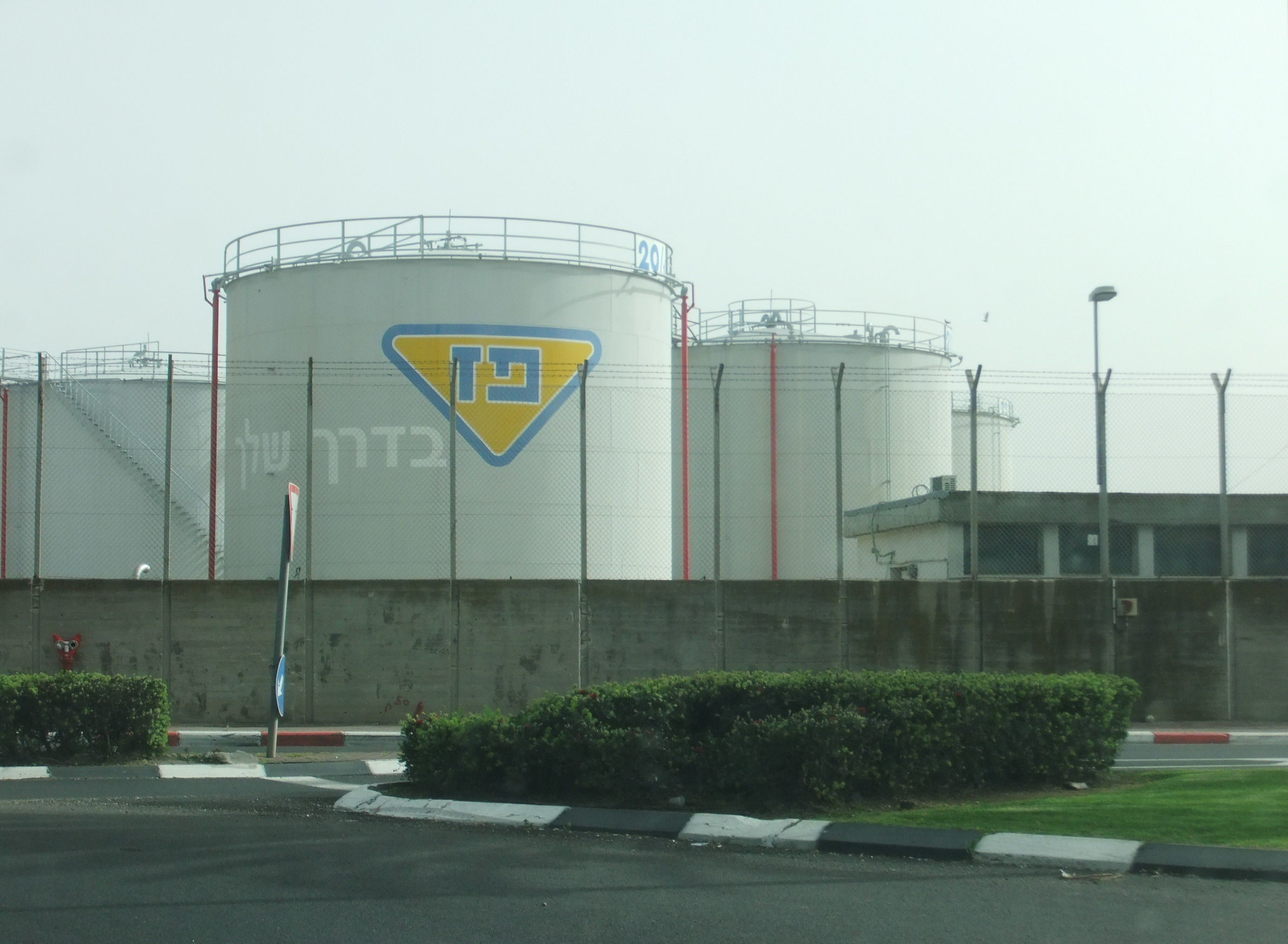
Paz Oil Company tanks near Ben Gurion Airport

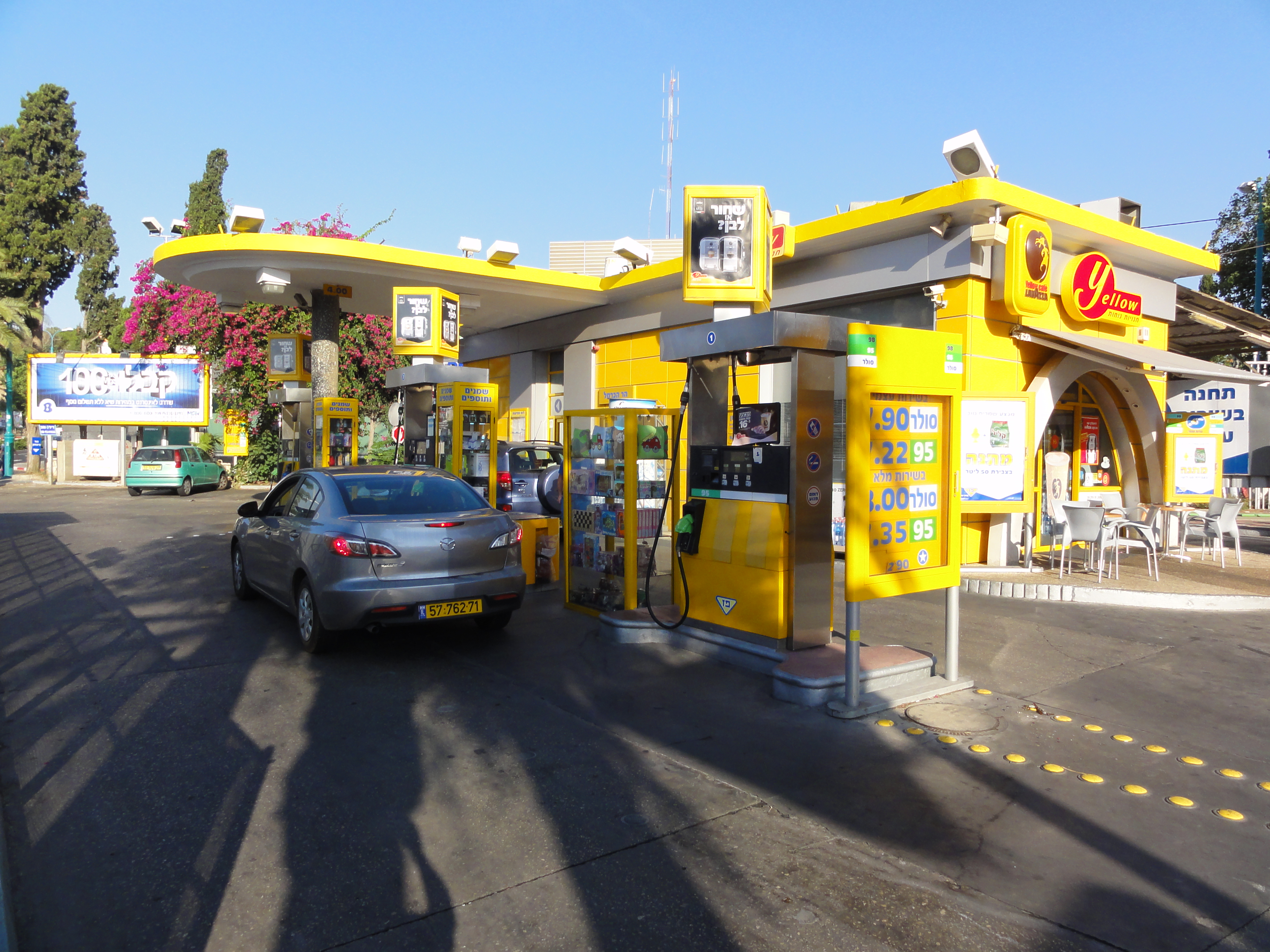
Paz filling station in Haifa

Paz Oil Company Ltd. (Hebrew: פז חברת הנפט בע"מ) (TASE: PZOL) is the largest Israeli oil and gas company. Paz distributes gasoline and other petroleum products through a network of gas stations, as well as LPG and natural gas for home use (cooking and heating) through its subsidiary PazGaz. Paz operates convenience stores in many gas stations, through its subsidiary Yellow. It also owns the supermarket chains Freshmarket and Super Yuda.

== History ==
=== Foundation, names, and ownership in the 20th century ===
Paz was founded in 1922 as Anglo-Asiatic Petroleum. From 1927, it operated as part of Royal Dutch Shell under the name Shell Palestine.

In 1957, Shell decided to withdraw from Israel due to economic pressure from Arab countries. In 1958, the company changed to the ownership of the Scottish businessman Isaac Wolfson and the French Nahmias brothers, and it was renamed Paz Petroleum Company Ltd. The company's symbol, a yellow triangle, still resembles that of Shell.

Wolfson sold his holdings in the company in 1981 to the State of Israel, which sold it in 1988 to the Australian Jack Liberman. Since 1999, the Israeli businessman Zadik Bino has owned the majority of the shares, with the Liberman family and other groups holding minority interests.

=== Investments and market reach in the 21st century ===
In 1999, Paz acquired 74 percent of the Israeli fast-food chain Burger Ranch. In late 2001, Paz completed the acquisition, becoming 100 percent owners of the chain. New branches of Burger Ranch were opened at Paz gas stations. In 2006, Paz sold the chain to the Israeli businessman Yossi Hoshinski.

In August 2006, Paz won a tender to acquire the Ashdod Oil Refineries with a NIS 3.5 billion bid, from Oil Refineries Ltd; which was forced to break its monopoly on oil refining in Israel. The acquisition made Paz Israel's most powerful energy company and its owner Zadik Bino the industry's most powerful figure.

In 2012, Paz held 30% of the Israeli fuel market and 31% of the Israeli gas stations. On 12 February 2020, Paz Oil was listed on the United Nations list of companies operating in West Bank settlements. On 5 July 2021, Norway's largest pension fund KLP said it would divest from Paz Oil as it helped to power Israeli settlements in the West Bank.

In March 2021, Paz acquired the Super Yuda supermarket chain for 170 million NIS. In August that year, it also acquired the Freshmarket chain.

== Operations ==
=== Retail and Wholesale ===
- 260 filling stations across Israel
- 255 Yellow convenience stores
- Pazgas - Israel’s largest gas company, supplying LPG to over half a million customers

=== Refining and Logistics ===
- Ashdod Oil Refineries

=== Industries and Services ===
- Paz Aviation
- Paz Solar
- Paz Lubricants & Chemicals
- Pazkar – manufacturer of bituminous products, waterproofing membranes, coatings and adhesives
