= Kokhav Hayarden Pumped Storage Power Station =

Hydroelectric dam in Beit She'an, Israel

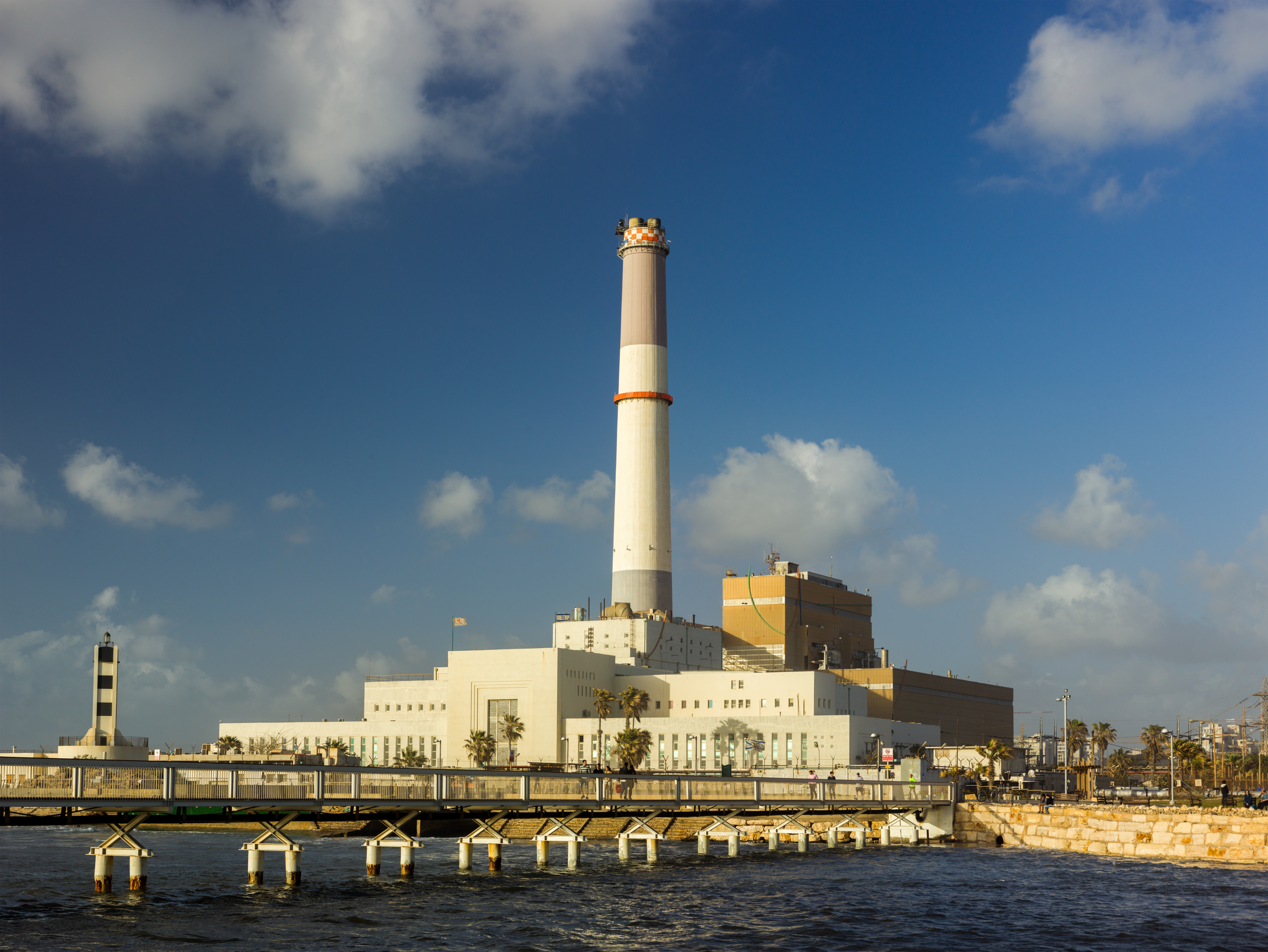
- Interactive map of Kokhav Hayarden Pumped Storage Power Station
- Country: Israel
- Coordinates: 32.601733°N 35.517283°E

Power Station
- Installed capacity: 344 MW

The Kokhav Hayarden Pumped Storage Power Station is a pumped-storage hydroelectric power station near Belvoir Castle in Beit She'an, Israel.
