= Orot Rabin =

Power station in Hadera, Israel

Orot Rabin Power Plant
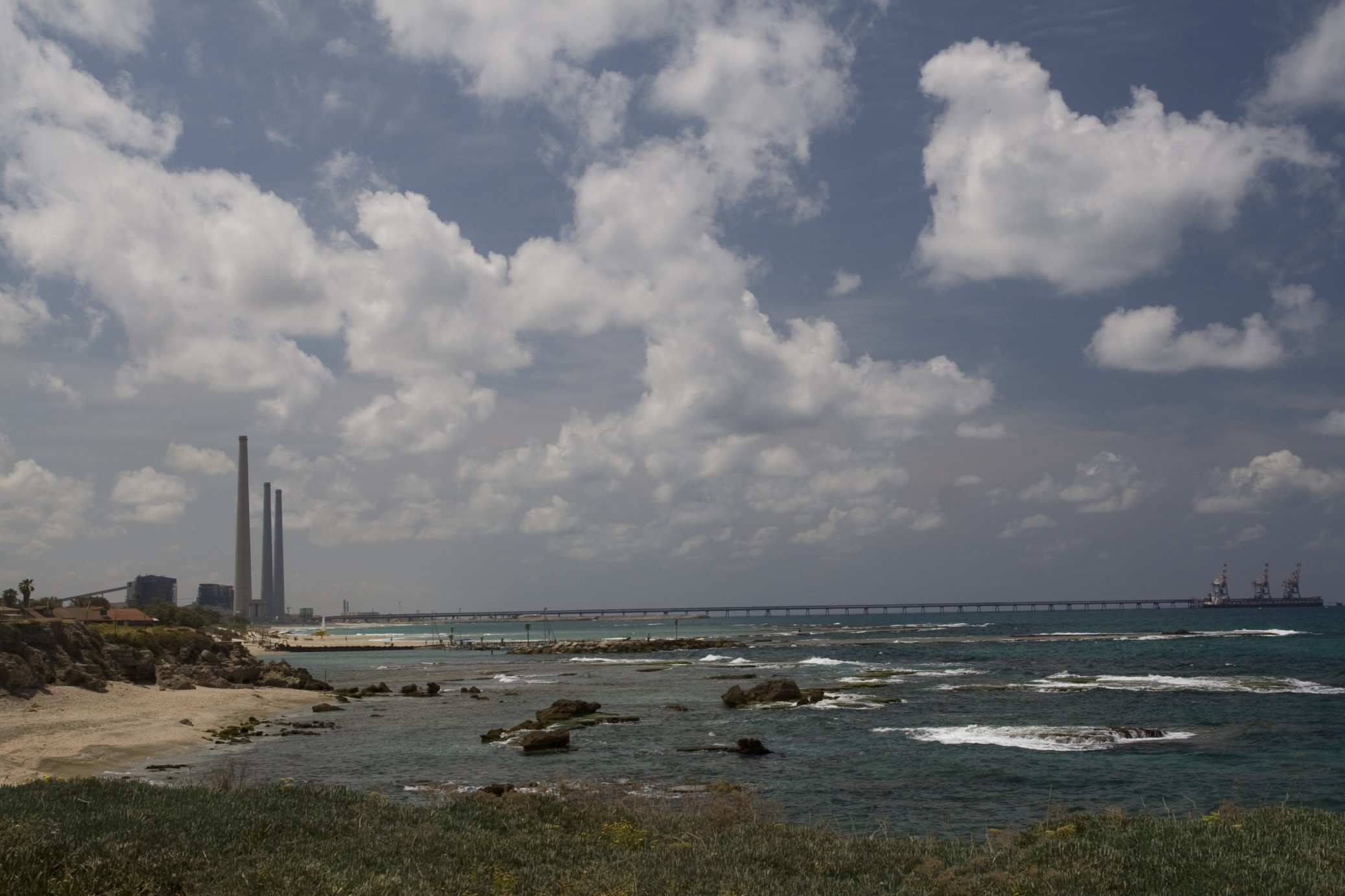
- Orot Rabin power plant and its coal pier, viewed from Caesarea Maritima
- Country: Israel
- Location: Hadera
- Coordinates: 32.47°N 34.8895°E
- Status: Operational
- Construction began: 1973
- Commission date: 1981-1984 (block 1); 1996 (block 2); 2023 (CCGT, planned)
- Owner: IEC

Thermal power station
- Primary fuel: Coal
- Secondary fuel: Fuel oil

Power generation
- Units operational: 4 × 375 MW; 2 × 575 MW
- Make and model: Babcock & Wilcox; ABB; GE; MAN; GE 9HA.01 (planned)
- Units planned: 2 × 630 MW (CCGT)
- Nameplate capacity: 2,590 MW

External links
- Commons: Related media on Commons

Orot Rabin (Hebrew: אורות רבין, lit. Rabin Lights) is a power station located on the Mediterranean coast in Hadera, Israel which is owned and operated by the Israel Electric Corporation (IEC). As of 2022 it is Israel’s largest power station and contains six thermal generation units capable of producing a total of 2.59 GW of electricity using coal as the primary fuel. In addition, under construction at the site are two single-shaft natural gas-powered combined-cycle units capable of generating 630 MW each. The older, unmodernised four of its total six coal-fuelled units will be closed by mid-2022 in order to eliminate this major source of air pollution in the country.

== History ==
Construction of the station began in 1973 and block 1 (steam boiler, turbine and generator units 1-4) began operating in stages between 1981 and 1984. A second generation block (boiler, turbine and generator units 5-6) came online in 1996. A coal port is attached directly to the station which supplies all its coal consumption needs. Its total generating capacity is 2,590 MW of electricity using the six power generating units (composed of two large units and four smaller units) located at the site. The plant's overall design can accommodate two additional large generation units which could be built at a future date.

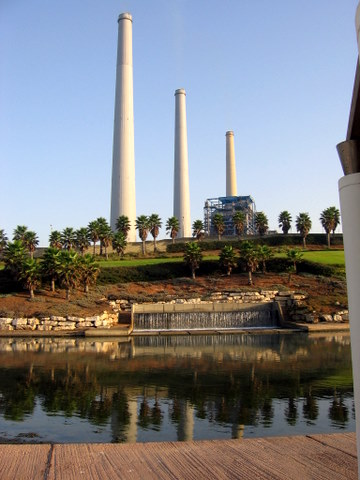
The chimneys at Orot Rabin

Originally the power station was named Maor David after David Shiffman, then-chairman of the IEC who died during its lengthy period of construction. However, after the completion of a major expansion of the station in the 1990s and the assassination of Yitzhak Rabin, the station was renamed in his honor to Orot Rabin, Hebrew for "Rabin Lights".

== Technical description ==
As of 2016 the plant is Israel's largest power station with its 2,590 MW representing about 19% of the Israel Electric Corporation's total generation capacity (that is, unless Phase D expansion at the Rutenberg Power Station in Ashkelon will be built, at which point the latter would surpass Orot Rabin as Israel's largest power station). The plant burns 18,000 tons of coal every 24 hours and uses 320,000 tons of seawater every hour. It is also possible to operate the station using fuel oil. In 2009, a large desalination plant was built adjacent to the power station. In the mid 2010s, a fourth flue stack coupled with a scrubber (for FGD) and additional pollution control devices (including an SCR system for NO_{x} reduction) were connected to generation block 2 of the station, significantly reducing the amount of particulate pollution emanating from the block.

Flue-gas stack 3 of the power station is 300 metres (980 ft) tall, making it Israel's second-tallest structure after the towers of the Dimona Radar Facility, although stack 3 is no longer used since the construction of flue stack 4.

The future Israeli landing point of the EuroAsia Interconnector is planned to be constructed at the site.

== Development: replacing coal with gas ==
=== Units 1-4 replacement ===
In 2016 the Israeli Ministry of Energy announced that the IEC would be ordered to shut down the older block 1 (generation units 1-4) of the station in the early 2020s. Block 1's production capacity will be replaced with a natural gas powered 2-unit combined cycle power plant utilizing two advanced GE Power HA-class gas turbines. One unit is expected to come online in the first quarter of 2023 and the second in the fourth quarter of that year. The new gas-powered plant is expected to be built in the space originally reserved for additional coal units in the northern part of the Orot Rabin site and although shut down, coal units 1-4 will continue to be maintained so that they may be restarted in case of emergency (such as an extended disruption in the domestic supply of natural gas).

==== Pollution ====
Coal units 1-4 are the oldest and most polluting ones in the country, producing about 25% of the main total particulates emissions generated by all sources in the entire country. Unlike block 2, as well as both blocks of the Rutenberg coal plant, a scrubber has not been fitted to the four units of Orot Rabin's block 1. The old, unmodernised coal-fueled units 1 through 4 pollute 10 to 1000 times more per kilowatt than natural gas-fueled power plants, and 3 to 8 times more than a coal plant fitted with scrubbers. In January 2026, it was announced that units 70-80 had been approved for use with natural gas, and units 5 and 6 were put on track for an approximately two-year long conversion process to operating with natural gas rather than coal, with the changes expected to reduce coal dust pollution by about 80%.

==== Productivity ====
The shutdown of coal units 1-4 will also save Israel's economy billions of shekels, and bring its electricity sector into the 21st century in accordance to developed world standards.

== Environmental issues ==
Orot Rabin has been accused of polluting the nearby Hadera Stream. Greenpeace claims that the station pollutes the sea water when coal is unloaded from ships and the sea water used for cooling the plant ends up in the Hadera River which harms wildlife.

On the other hand, hot water gushing from the plant draws schools of hundreds of sandbar and dusky sharks every winter. Scientists are researching the rare phenomenon, which is unknown in the vicinity. It is speculated that the water, which is ten degrees warmer than the rest of the sea, may be the attraction.

== See also ==
- Economy of Israel
- Energy in Israel
- List of power stations in Israel
