= Dorad Power Station =

Power station near Ashkelon, Israel

Dorad power station
- Country: Israel
- Location: Ashkelon
- Coordinates: 31°38′6″N 34°31′48″E
- Status: Operational
- Construction began: 2011
- Commission date: 19 May 2014
- Construction cost: US$1 billion
- Owner: Dorad Energy Ltd.

Thermal power station
- Primary fuel: Natural gas
- Secondary fuel: Light fuel oil
- Combined cycle?: Yes

Power generation
- Units operational: 12 × gas turbines, 12 × steam generators, 2 × steam turbines
- Make and model: General Electric (gas turbines), Innovative Steam Technologies (steam generators), Škoda (steam turbines)
- Units planned: 1 × 650 MW
- Nameplate capacity: 840 MW

External links
- Website: www.dorad.co.il/home

The Dorad power station is a power station in Ashkelon, Israel. It is a combined cycle power station powered by natural gas.

== Overview ==
Dorad is the second largest independent power station in the country. It can generate up to a total of 840 megawatts of electricity, which is sold to the IEC and to large industrial/institutional customers through the IEC's distribution grid. The major owners of the station are the EAPC, the Turkish Zorlu Energy and a group of Israeli businessmen.

The station is located near the IEC's Rutenberg Power Station (a large thermal power station), and is situated on the grounds of the EAPC's complex in Ashkelon. It features twelve General Electric LM6000-PC Sprint 48MW gas turbines arranged in two blocks of six turbines each, with each block connected to a 140MW combined cycle steam turbine manufactured by Škoda Power. The gas turbines' operation will be enhanced through the injection of ultra-purified water supplied from the adjacent Ashkelon desalinization plant, one of the largest of its kind in the world.

As of 2020, Dorad is seeking approval from the national planning authorities for the addition of a 650MW generation unit and a 80MWh grid energy storage battery installation to the site.

In May 2023, it was announced that Prime Minister Netanyahu's Government approved an expansion of the Dorad power station.
