= Dalia Power Station =

Power station in Israel

Dalia power station
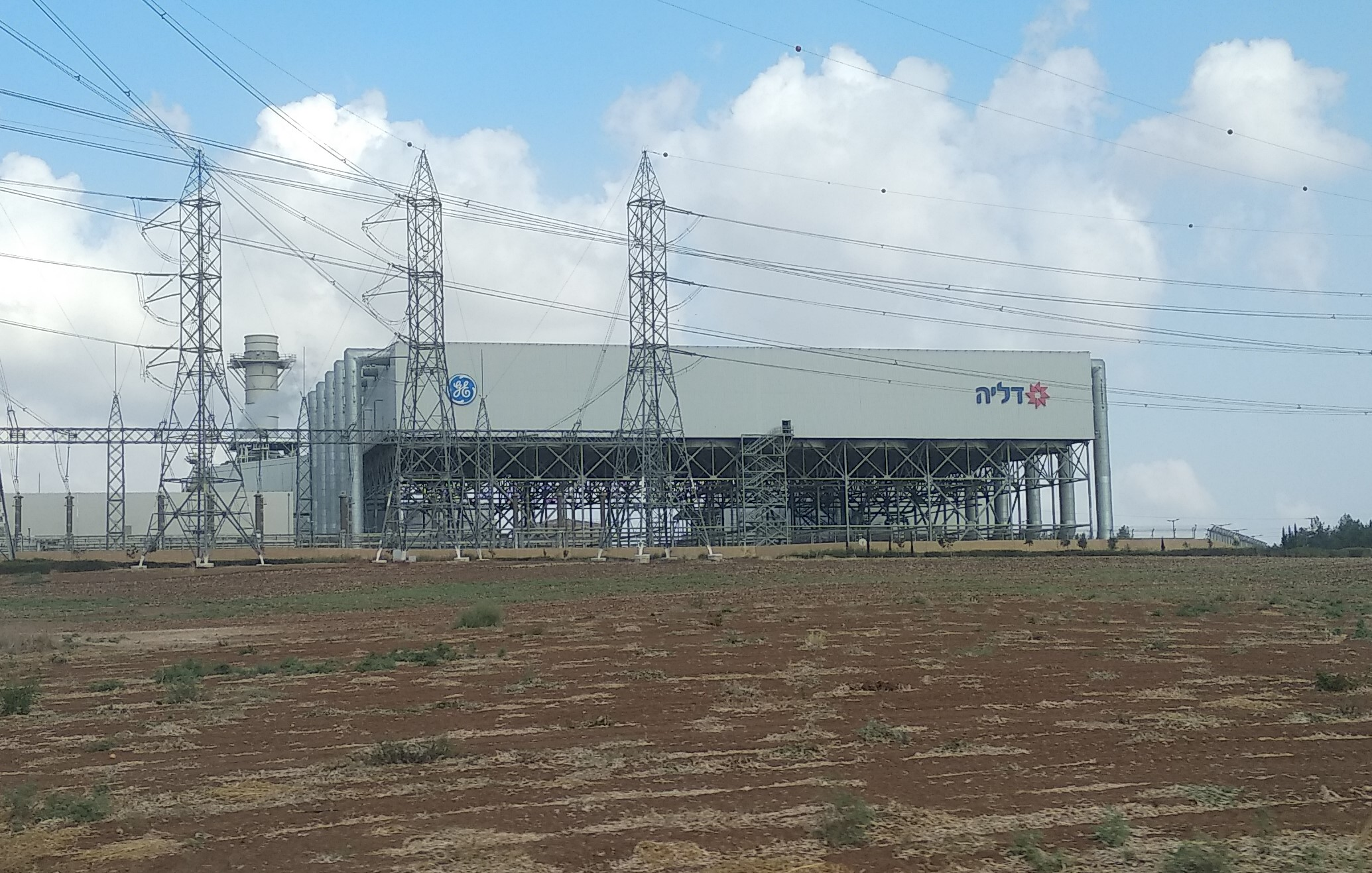
- Country: Israel
- Location: Kfar Menahem
- Coordinates: 31°42′51″N 34°50′34″E
- Status: Operational
- Construction began: 2013
- Commission date: September 2015
- Construction cost: US$1 billion
- Owner: Dalia Energies Ltd.

Thermal power station
- Primary fuel: Natural gas
- Secondary fuel: Light fuel oil
- Combined cycle?: Yes

Power generation
- Units operational: 2
- Make and model: Alstom KA26
- Nameplate capacity: 870 MW

External links
- Website: www.dalia-power.co.il
- Commons: Related media on Commons

The Dalia power station is a power station located approximately 2 km southeast of Kfar Menahem, Israel, nearby Tel Tzafit.

Owned by Dalia Energies, Ltd., an Israeli holding company, it is the largest independent power station in the country. It can generate up to a total of 870 megawatts (MW) of electricity which is sold to the IEC and to large industrial/institutional customers through the IEC's distribution grid.

The station is located adjacent to the IEC's Tzafit power complex, a major switching junction in the national electrical grid that also houses several existing IEC-owned and operated turbines with a total generation capacity of 615MW.

The Dalia power station consists of two Alstom KA26 single-shaft combined cycle power plant packages, each containing a GT26 gas turbine, STF15C steam turbine, generator and a heat recovery steam generator (HRSG). Alstom is also tasked with designing and constructing the station, then operating and maintaining it over a 20-year period. Additionally, Dalia Energies has requested permission from the electric authority to conduct a feasibility study for adding additional generation units to the station.

The station's primary fuel is natural gas, with light fuel oil acting as a backup fuel. The plant's owners have committed to purchasing at least 1.4 billion cubic meters (BCM) of natural gas annually from the offshore Tamar gas field to power the station.

== Dalia 2 ==
In December 2024, Dalia Energy Companies signed a memorandum of understanding with Bank Leumi and Bank Discount for financing of approximately 4.25 billion NIS to establish a new power generation unit at the Tzafit site, with a capacity of 630 to 900 megawatts. The planned station will be based on an advanced H-class gas turbine, offering an energy efficiency of 63%, one of the highest in Israel.
