= Ashdod Oil Refineries =

Oil refinery in Southern District, Israel

Ashdod Refinery Ltd.

- Location within Ashkelon region of Israel
- Location: Ashdod, Southern District, Israel; 31°50′34″N 34°40′47″E

Refinery details
- Operator: Ashdod Refinery
- Owner: Ashdod Refinery
- Opened: 1973
- No. of employees: 230

Ashdod Refinery Ltd. (Hebrew: בית זיקוק אשדוד) situated in the coastal city of Ashdod is the second largest oil refinery in Israel (behind Haifa's oil refinery). It is located in the industrial zone in the northern part of the city, nearby the Port of Ashdod. As of 2014, it has an annual refining capacity of 5.4 million tons of oil, with a Nelson complexity index of 9.8.

== History ==
The refinery was once part of the formerly governmental company Oil Refineries Ltd. which owned both the Ashdod and Haifa refineries. As part of the effort to privatize the refining sector in country the Ashdod refinery was sold to the Paz Oil Company in 2006.

The refinery commenced operations in 1973, after three years of construction, in order to meet the needs of the Israeli market which exceeded the production capacity of the Haifa Refinery. The decision to construct a new refinery on the sand dunes north of Ashdod was based on the following considerations: available land, geographical dispersion of refining industries due to security risks, centrally located in the heart of the country’s area of consumption, occupational opportunities for Ashdod, proximity to the Pi Glilot fuel depot and the Eshkol Power Station. Today, a pipeline connects the refinery to the national fuel pipeline, the crude oil Eilat-Ashkelon pipeline and two Israel Electric Company sea lines in Ashdod. The Ashdod Refinery is also connected to the national natural gas distribution grid. The use of natural gas significantly reduces the emission of contaminants to the environment, and is economical in energy costs. Natural gas electric and steam plants were constructed on the site of the refinery, and began operation in 2008.

== Milestones ==
- 1992 - Construction of catalytic crack and sulfur recovery unit completed
- 2003 - HDS (hydro-desulfurization) unit and truck loading terminal for distillates were constructed; catalytic cracker upgraded.
- 2002-2005 - Over USD 13 million invested in environmental protection: reduction of emissions of contaminants; treatment of sewage and prevention of marine pollution; treatment of groundwater, soil and hazardous materials. Preparations are made to connect to the natural gas pipeline and use natural gas to reduce production costs.
- 2006 – Paz Oil Company Ltd. was awarded the tender to purchase the Refinery from the State, and paid approximately NIS 3.25 billions for full ownership of Israel’s second largest oil refinery.
- 2023 - On 30.8.2023 Ashdod Refinery become a publics company, trade at Tel Aviv stock exchange.

== Figures ==
Type	Production [Thousands tons per year]
Gasoline	1,000
Gasoil	1,300
LPG	250
Jet fuel	300
Fuel Oil	1,300
Total	4,000

- Storage Capacity - 700,000 m3.
- Refinery site - 1100 dunams
- Number of employees - 230
