= Ashalim Power Station =

Concentrated solar thermal power station in Israel

Ashalim power station
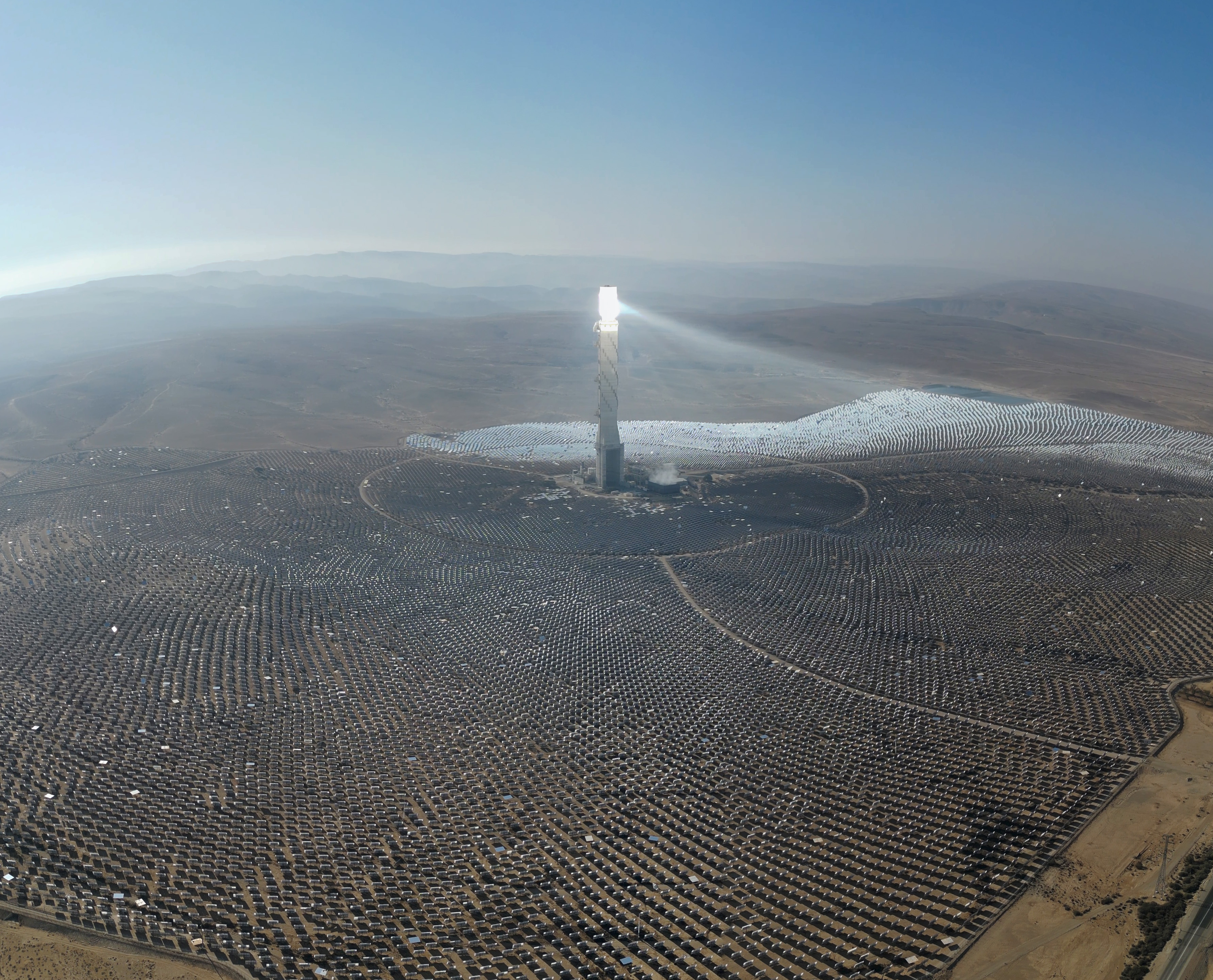
- Official name: Ashalim Solar Thermal Power Station
- Country: Israel
- Location: Negev Desert
- Coordinates: 30°57′45″N 34°43′48″E
- Status: Operational
- Construction began: 2014
- Commission date: 2019
- Owners: Megalim Solar Power & Negev Energy
- Operator: Alstom

Solar farm
- Type: CSP, PV
- CSP technology: T, PT

Power generation
- Nameplate capacity: 2x 121 MW CSP, 30 MW PV

External links
- Website: www.brightsourceenergy.com
- Commons: Related media on Commons

The Ashalim power station is a concentrated solar power station in the Negev desert near the community settlement of Ashalim, south of the district city of Be'er Sheva in Israel. It consists of three plots with three different technologies through which the station combines 3 kinds of energy: solar thermal energy, photovoltaic energy, and natural gas.

Ashalim Plot A (Negev Energy) is a 121 megawatt parabolic trough plant with 4.5 hours of thermal energy storage.

The Ashalim Plot B (Megalim) hosts a solar power tower. It has an installed capacity of 121 megawatts, concentrating 50,600 computer-controlled heliostats enough to power 120,000 homes. Electricity production commenced in September 2019, producing 320 GWhr of energy per year. The project was a joint venture between Brightsource and Alstom. The station was the tallest solar power tower in the world at a height of 260 meters including the boiler but was recently surpassed by the 262.44-meter-tall (861.0 ft) solar power tower at the Mohammed bin Rashid Al Maktoum Solar Park.

Ashalim Plot C is a 30 MW photovoltaic plant, commissioned in 2018, one year before the CSP plants.

In 2019 EDF Renewables won a tender for another NIS 150 ($43) million PV plant at a record low price of 8.68 agorot (3 cents) per kilowatt hour.

== Reasons for building the power station ==
According to a press release of the National Infrastructure Minister of Israel, the establishment has several motivations:

1. Economic motivation: reducing imports thus balancing the trade and releasing foreign currency.
2. Political motivation: reducing strategic dependence on foreign energy sources.
3. Environmental motivation: reducing contamination levels.
4. Scientific motivation: pushing forward local technology and science, adapting new technologies from abroad.
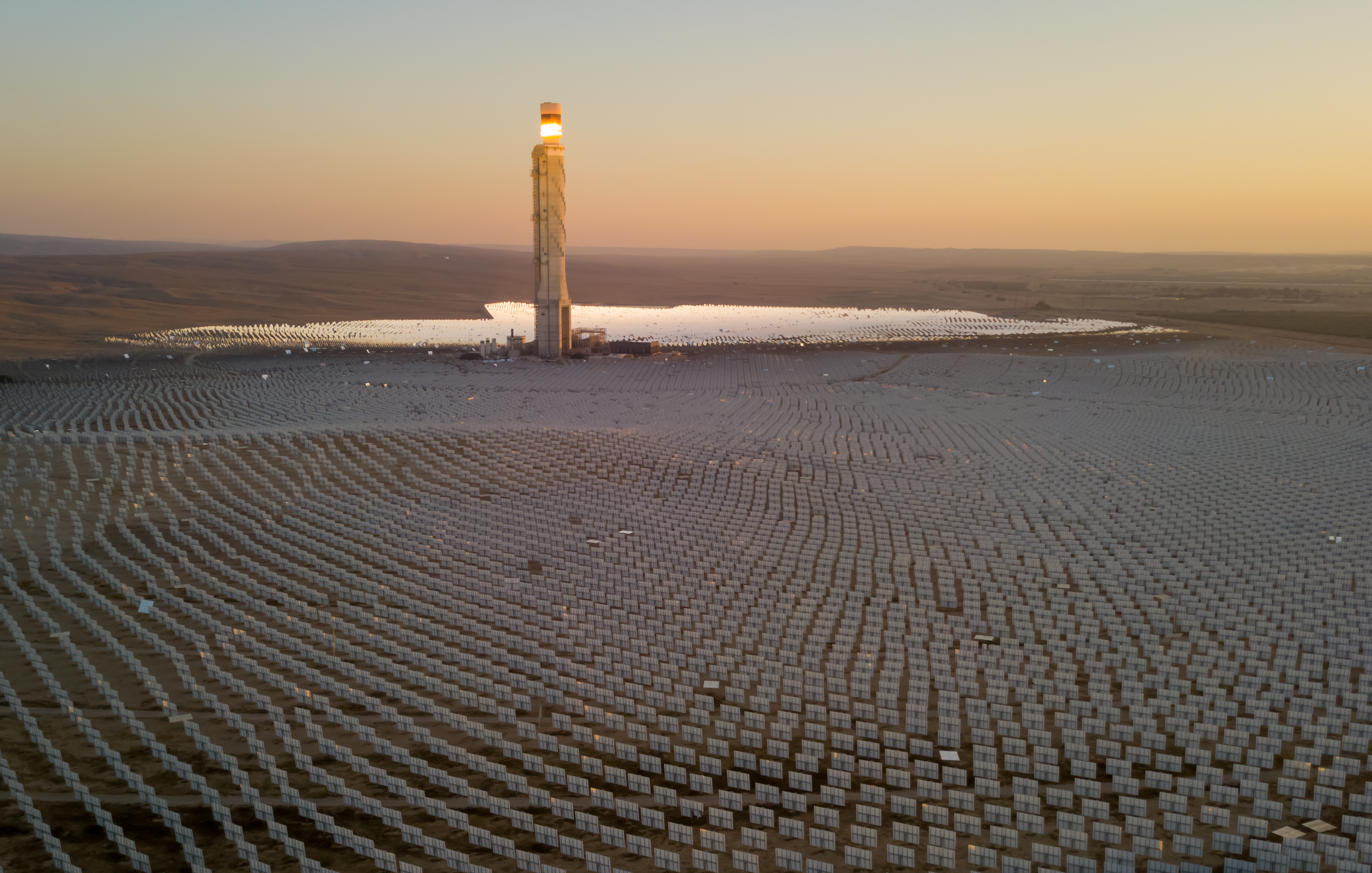

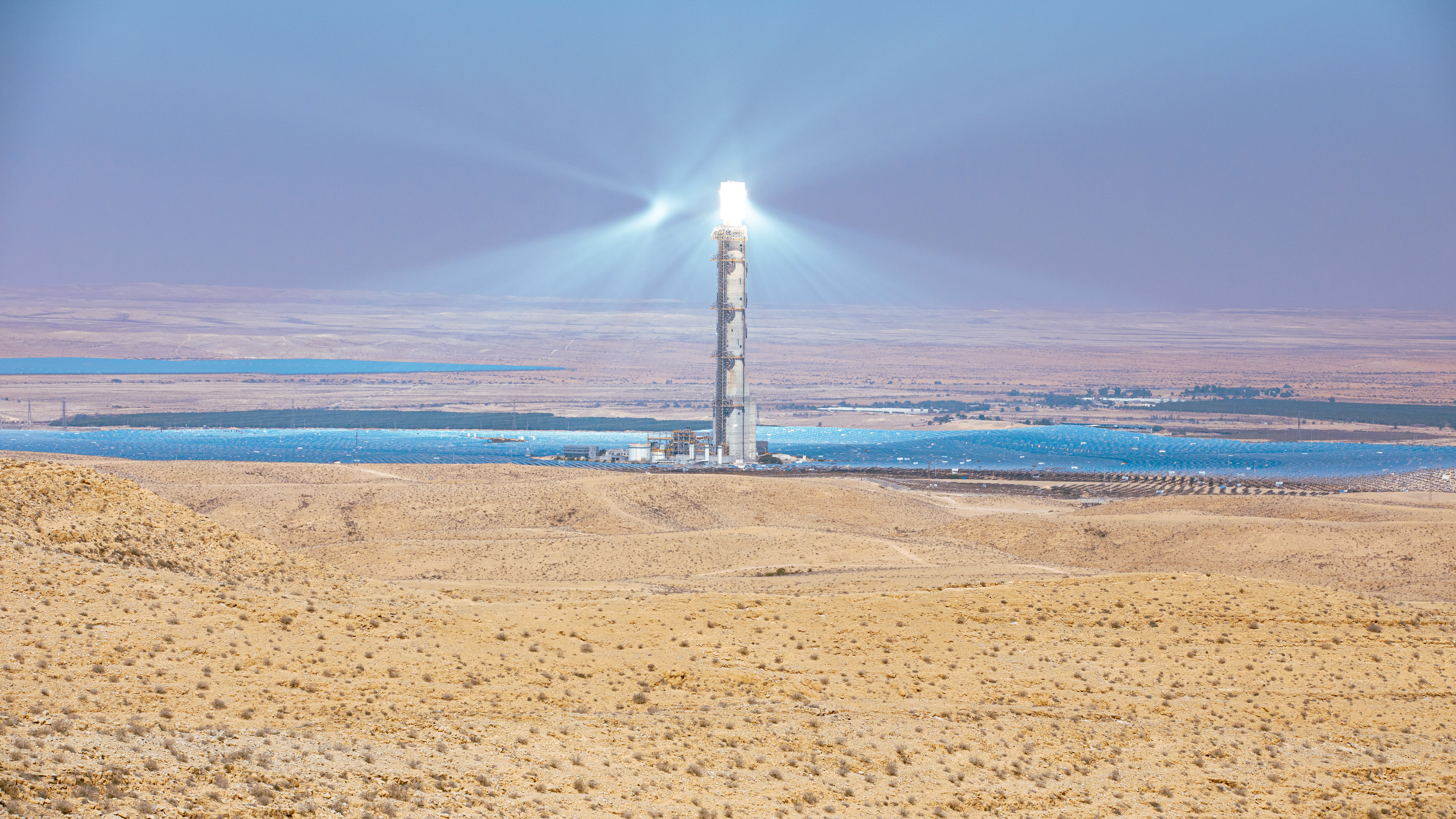

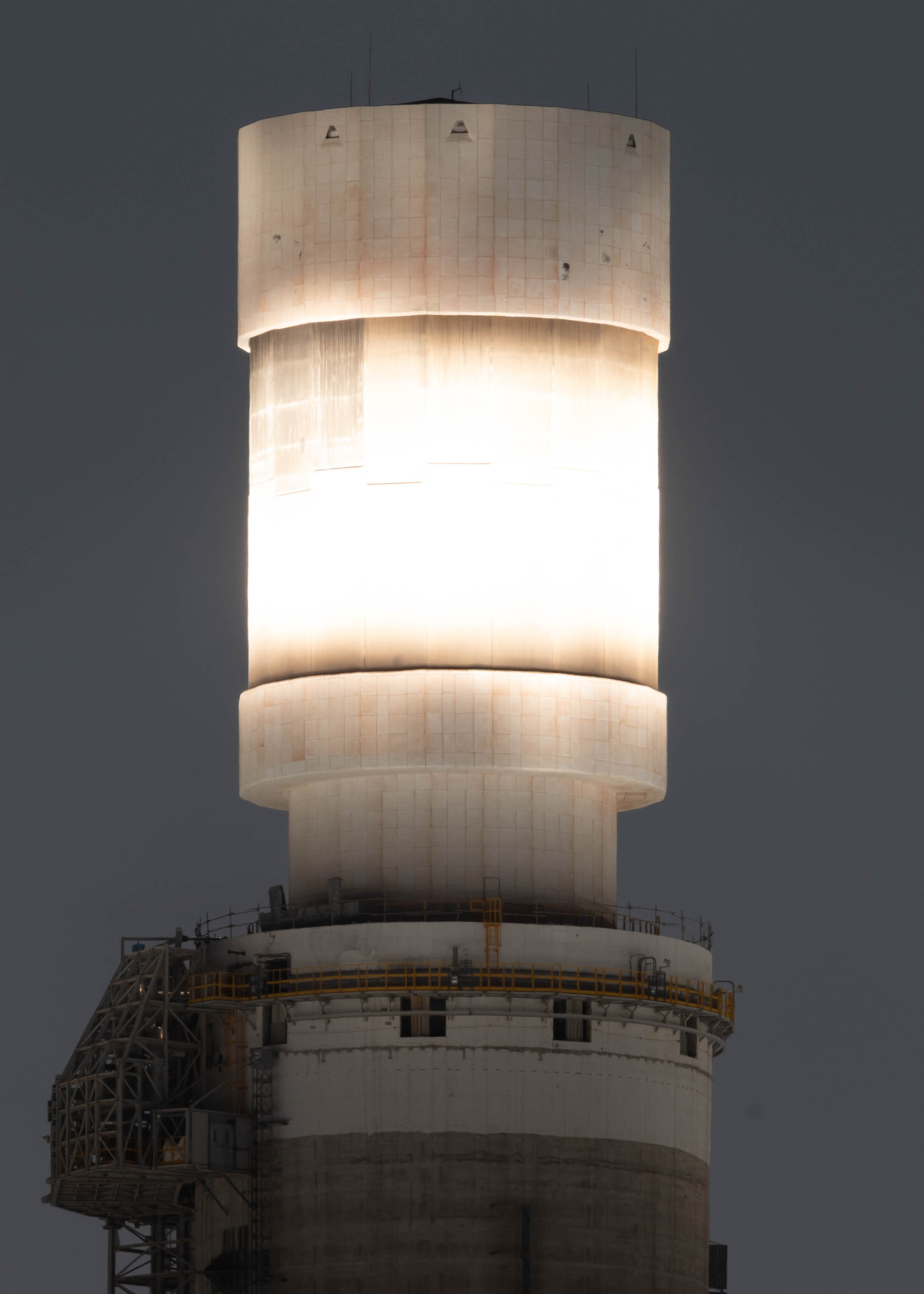

== Cost concerns ==
The concentrated solar power project in Ashalim was announced in 2008 and awarded in a competitive auction 2012 at NIS0.79 ($0.22) per kilowatt hour for Plot B – almost a factor of 9 compared to the PV stations tendered in 2019 at the same spot (see above). Similarly, the project on Plot A at NIS 0.76 per kWh, but including 4.5 hours of molten salt storage, delivers four times more expensive power than the results of tenders for solar plus 4 hours of storage awarded at the beginning of 2021 at NIS0.17/kWh ($0.054) to be delivered by 2023.

== See also ==
- List of solar thermal power stations
