= Eshkol Power Station =

Power plant in Israel

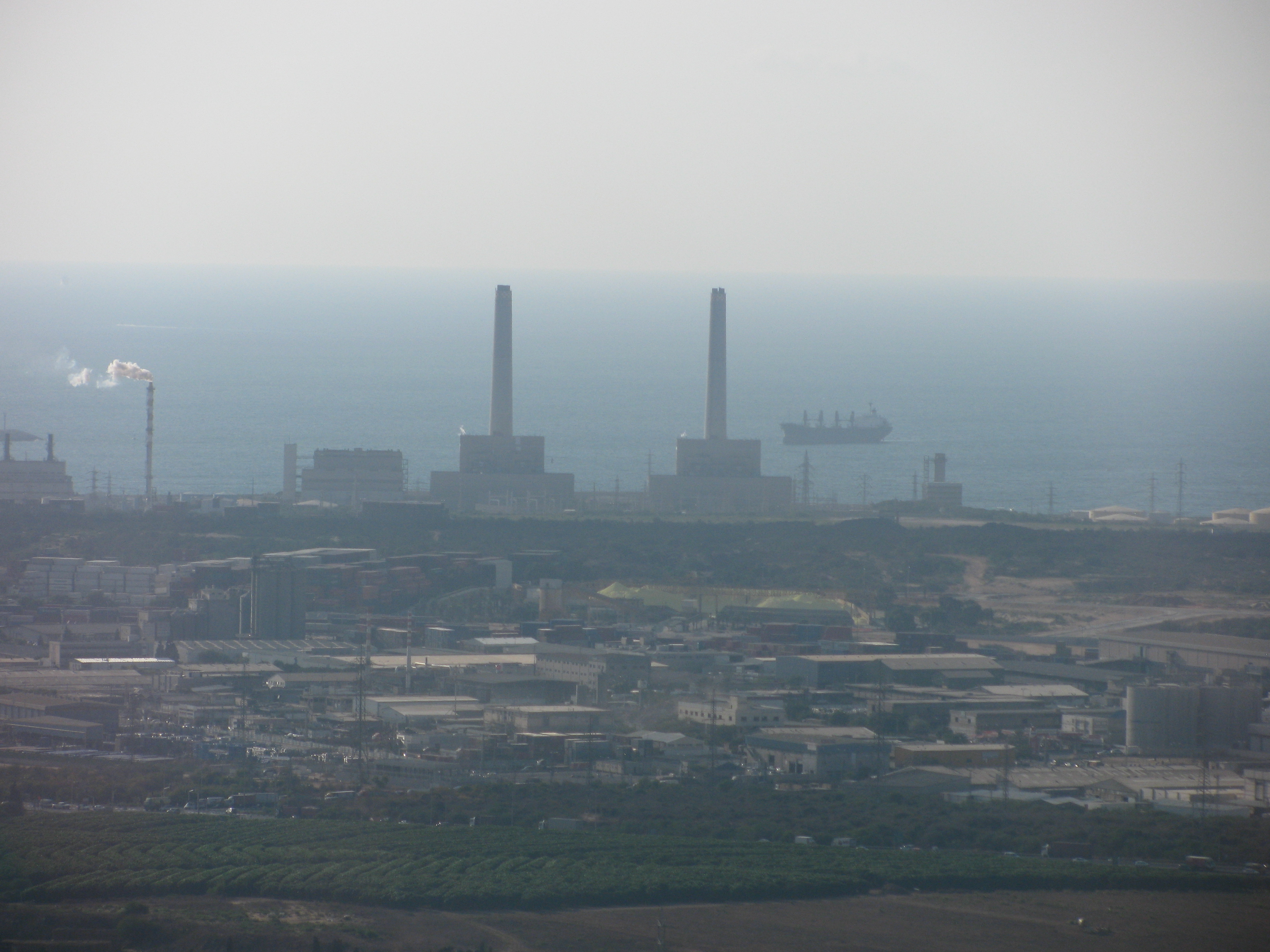
- Country: Israel
- Location: Ashdod
- Coordinates: 31°50′50.95″N 34°39′43.02″E
- Status: Operational
- Owner: IEC

Thermal power station
- Primary fuel: Natural gas
- Turbine technology: Open cycle gas turbine, combined cycle)
- Combined cycle?: Partial

Power generation
- Units operational: 4 × 228 MW (steam, to be decommissioned); 2 × 335 MW (combined cycle); 1 × 10 (gas turbine)
- Nameplate capacity: 1,692 MW

External links
- Commons: Related media on Commons

The Eshkol Power Station is a power station supplying electrical power to the Shephelah region in Israel. It is located in north industrial zone of Ashdod near the mouth of the Lakhish River, close to the port of Ashdod and the Ashdod Oil Refineries which provided the plant with fuel oil prior to its conversion to use natural gas. The power station is also close to the sea since its cooling system uses sea water.

Like other significant power stations in Israel, Eshkol Power Station belongs to Israel Electric Corporation. It is the third biggest power plant in Israel in terms of production ability, providing 7.3 percent of electricity production by IEC.

The power station was named after Levi Eshkol, former Prime Minister of Israel.

== History ==
In 1953, following an Israeli Government decision, surveyors and designers arrived at the desolate dunes to choose a site to build a new power station in the south of the country. Its builders lived in the regional settlements Rehovot and Gedera.

The building of the Eshkol power station was completed in 1958 and included 3 units: 2 units of 50 MW, and one unit of 45 MW. Between 1975 and 1977 a total of four 228 MW fuel oil driven thermal generation units in two blocks came online, making the station Israel’s largest power plant at the time. These were converted in 2004 to dual fuel operation using natural gas. At the same time two combined-cycle natural gas turbines were also added to the site with a total capacity of 770 MW.

== Electricity generation ==
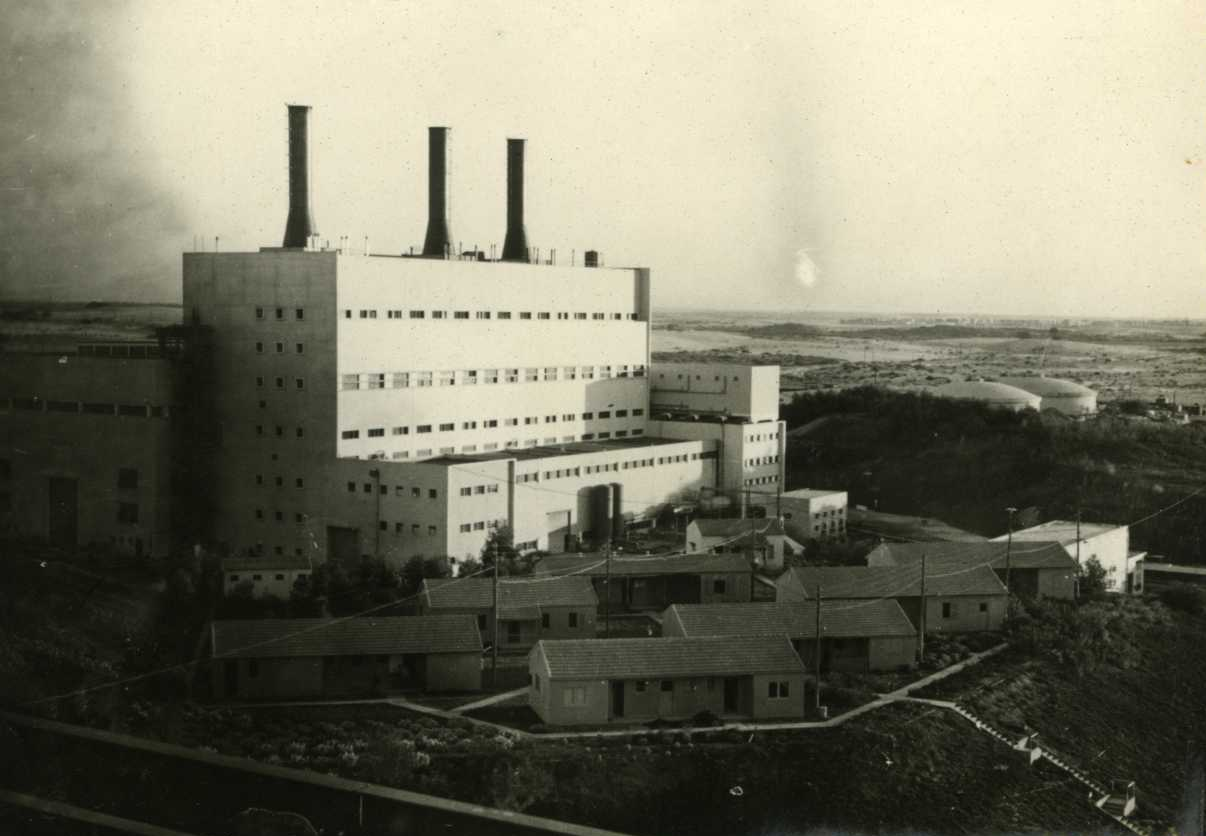
Eshkol Power Station in 1963

Originally steam only, today Eshkol is multi unit power station. Eshkol was the first (2004) power station in Israel to produce electricity from natural gas.

Unit	Fuel	Capacity [MW]
Steam/thermal	fuel oil or natural gas	912
Gas turbines	fuel oil	10
Combined Cycle	fuel oil or natural gas	770
Total		1,692

- Natural Gas Consumption - 223 tonnes per hour.
- Fuel Oil Consumption - 36 tonnes per hour.
- Cooling Water consumption - 186 tonnes per hour.

Due to their age and low efficiency, the IEC intends to decommission the four thermal units at the site by 2019.

There is also sea water desalination plant based on steam turbine.

One of the small private electricity producers is also located in Ashdod. It is operated under IEC supervision.
