= Mishor Rotem Power Station =

- Country: Israel
- Location: Mishor Rotem, Dimona
- Coordinates: 31°03′19″N 35°11′04″E
- Status: Operational
- Construction began: 1987 (oil shale-fired plant)
- Commission date: 1989 (oil shale-fired plant); 2013 (natural gas-fired plant)
- Decommission date: 2011 (oil shale-fired plant)
- Construction cost: US$30 million (oil shale-fired plant); US$500 million (natural gas-fired plant)
- Owners: Israel Corporation; Veolia Environnement
- Operators: Rotem Amfert (oil shale-fired plant); OPC Rotem (natural gas-fired plant)

Thermal power station
- Primary fuel: Oil shale (until 2011); Natural gas (since 2013)
- Secondary fuel: Light fuel oil (since 2013)
- Combined cycle?: Yes

Power generation
- Units operational: 1 × 13 MW (oil shale-fired plant, decommissioned); 1 × 440 MW (natural gas-fired plant)
- Make and model: Alstom (oil shale-fired plant); Mitsubishi Heavy Industries (natural gas-fired plant)
- Units planned: 1 × 580 MW
- Nameplate capacity: 440 MW

The Mishor Rotem Power Station is a former oil shale-fired power station and current natural gas-fired power station in Mishor Rotem, Israel. It is operated by OPC Rotem, a subsidiary of the Israel Corporation (80%) and Veolia Environnement (20%).

== Oil shale-fired power plant ==
The oil shale-fired power plant was first commissioned as 1978 as a test pilot plant, with an installed capacity of 0.1 MW. Between 1982 and 1986, the PAMA, a subsidiary of Israel Electric Corporation, established and operated a 1 MW pilot plant. After a R&D program was carried out and funded by PAMA and the Israel Ministry of National Infrastructures with an investment of approximately $30 million, the 13 MW demonstration plant was completed in 1989. The generated power was sold to the Israel Electric Corporation (IEC), and low-pressure steam was supplied to an adjacent industrial complex. After 2000, the power station was operated by Rotem Amfert Negev, a subsidiary of Israel Chemicals, an Israel Corporation company.

The power station required approximately half a million tons of oil shale annually, which was transported from a nearby open-pit mine. A large part of the ash generated in the process was used in products such as cat litter. Most of the ash product was distributed in Europe under the commercial name Alganite.

== OPC Rotem natural gas power plant ==
OPC Rotem, a joint venture of IC Power, a subsidiary of the Israel Corporation, and Dalkia Israel Ltd., a subsidiary of Veolia Environnement, built a 440 MW single-shaft combined cycle natural gas-fired power plant at the site. Constructed by Daewoo with turbines and generators from Mitsubishi Heavy Industries, it came on-line in the summer of 2013.

As of 2020, OPC is seeking approval from the national planning authorities for the addition of a 530MW generation unit to the site.

== See also ==
- Oil shale in Israel
