= Rutenberg Power Station =

Coal-fired power plant in Ashkelon, Israel

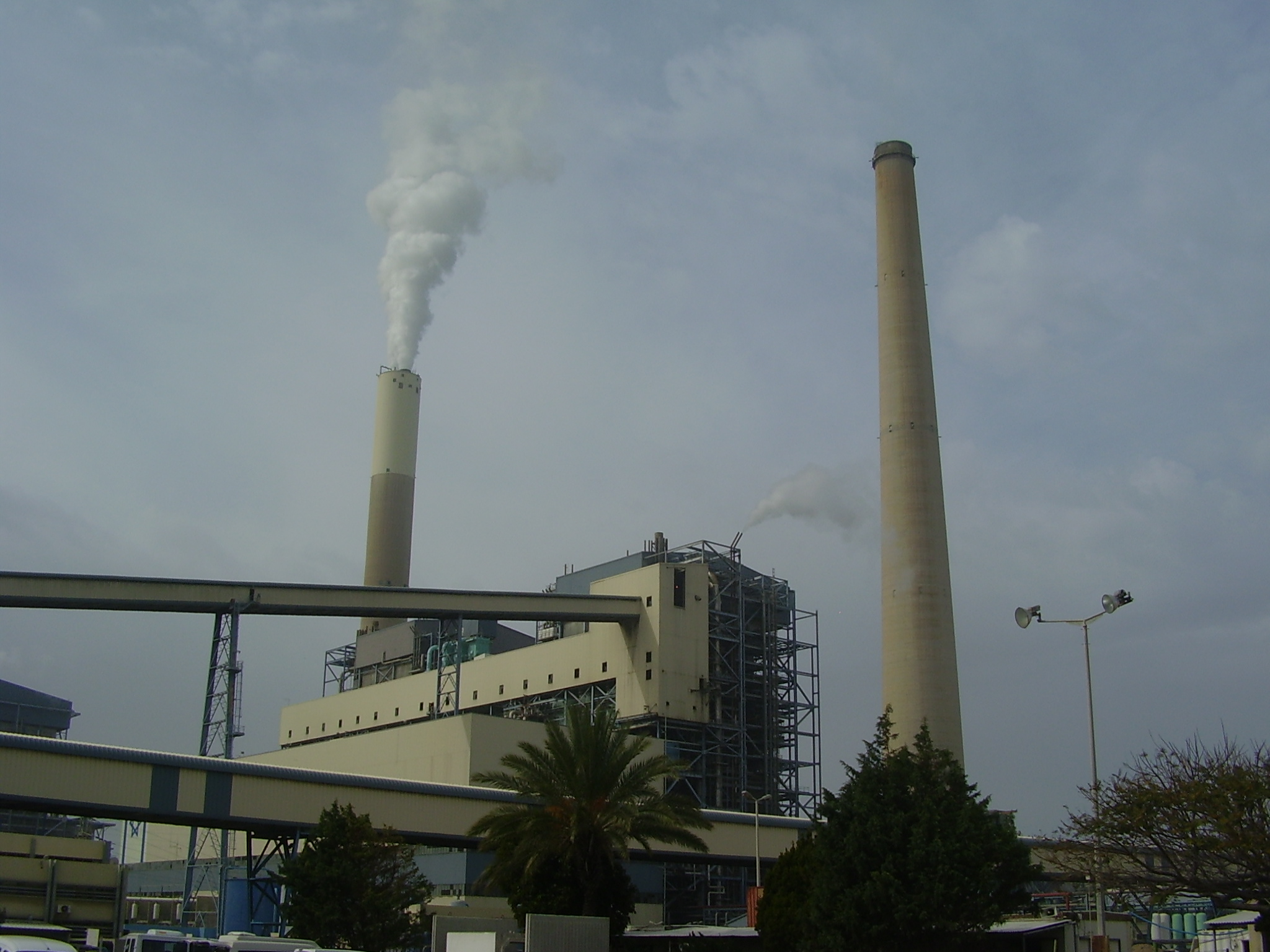
- Country: Israel
- Location: Ashkelon
- Coordinates: 31°37′39″N 34°30′58″E
- Status: Operational
- Commission date: 1990 (block A); 2000 (block B)
- Owner: Israel Electric Corporation

Thermal power station
- Primary fuel: Coal
- Cooling source: Seawater

Power generation
- Units operational: 2 × 550 MW; 2 × 575 MW
- Make and model: GEC-Alstom (turbines); ABB (turbines); Babcock & Wilcox (boilers); Combustion Engineering (boilers)
- Nameplate capacity: 2,250 MW

External links
- Commons: Related media on Commons

The Rutenberg Power Station is a coal-fired power plant situated on the Mediterranean coast in Ashkelon, Israel.

== Description ==
The Rutenberg power station, named for Pinhas Rutenberg, is owned and operated by the Israel Electric Corporation (IEC). Rutenberg is the newest thermal power station in Israel and the second largest in terms of generation capacity. It accounts for about 15 percent of the IEC's total capacity. The power station is situated close to the sea since its cooling system uses sea water.

=== Technical data ===
The power station has a total installed capacity of 2,250 MW. It is arranged in two blocks, each containing two power generating units. Two 550 MW boilers were supplied by Combustion Engineering (ABB) and two 575 MW boilers were supplied by Babcock & Wilcox. Turbines and generators were supplied by GEC-Alstom and ABB.

The power station consumes 18,240 tonnes of coal per day, and 330 tonnes of cooling water per hour.

==== Pollution control ====
Block B was constructed with a scrubber (for FGD), while additional pollution control devices were being fitted to the block in 2020. Block A was not originally constructed with an FGD scrubber but one was later retrofitted to it (which also necessitated the construction of a new flue stack). It along with other pollution control devices (including an SCR system for NO_{x} reduction) became operational in December 2018.

== History ==
Construction began in the early 1980s, after completion of the first phase of the Orot Rabin power station near Hadera. Phase A became operational in 1990. Phase B was finished in 2000. Coal was transported to the station by freight trains from the Port of Ashdod until an on-site deepwater coal pier was completed in 2000. On 7 October 2023, the power plant was attacked by rockets, presumably by Hamas.

== Incidents ==
On May 8th, 1998, nine workers were killed during construction work on the chimney of Unit B. Five others were rescued by a helicopter of the Special Rescue Tactical Unit (669) of the Israeli Air Force.

On March 13th, 2023, a crane on the pier collapsed as a result of strong winds. One person was hurt and two were killed. Their corpses were found several days later. As a result, it was impossible to supply the power plant by ship and it was necessary to deliver coal to the plant by truck, requiring 170 truck journeys per day.

On May 21st, 2024, a worker received an electric shock and died five days later.

== Cancelled expansion ==
Phase D expansion consisting of additional coal units at the site was approved in 2008. However, several subsequent objections and the greatly increased availability of domestically-produced natural gas in Israel as an alternative to imported coal starting in the early 2010s led to the plan's cancellation. As a result, 60 dunams of land originally reserved for phase D expansion at the site will be returned by the IEC to the State of Israel in 2020. If built, Phase D would have increased plant generation capacity by an additional 1,250 MW.
