= List of companies of Israel =

Listing of notable companies headquartered in the state of the state of Israel

This is a list of notable companies in Israel.

== A ==
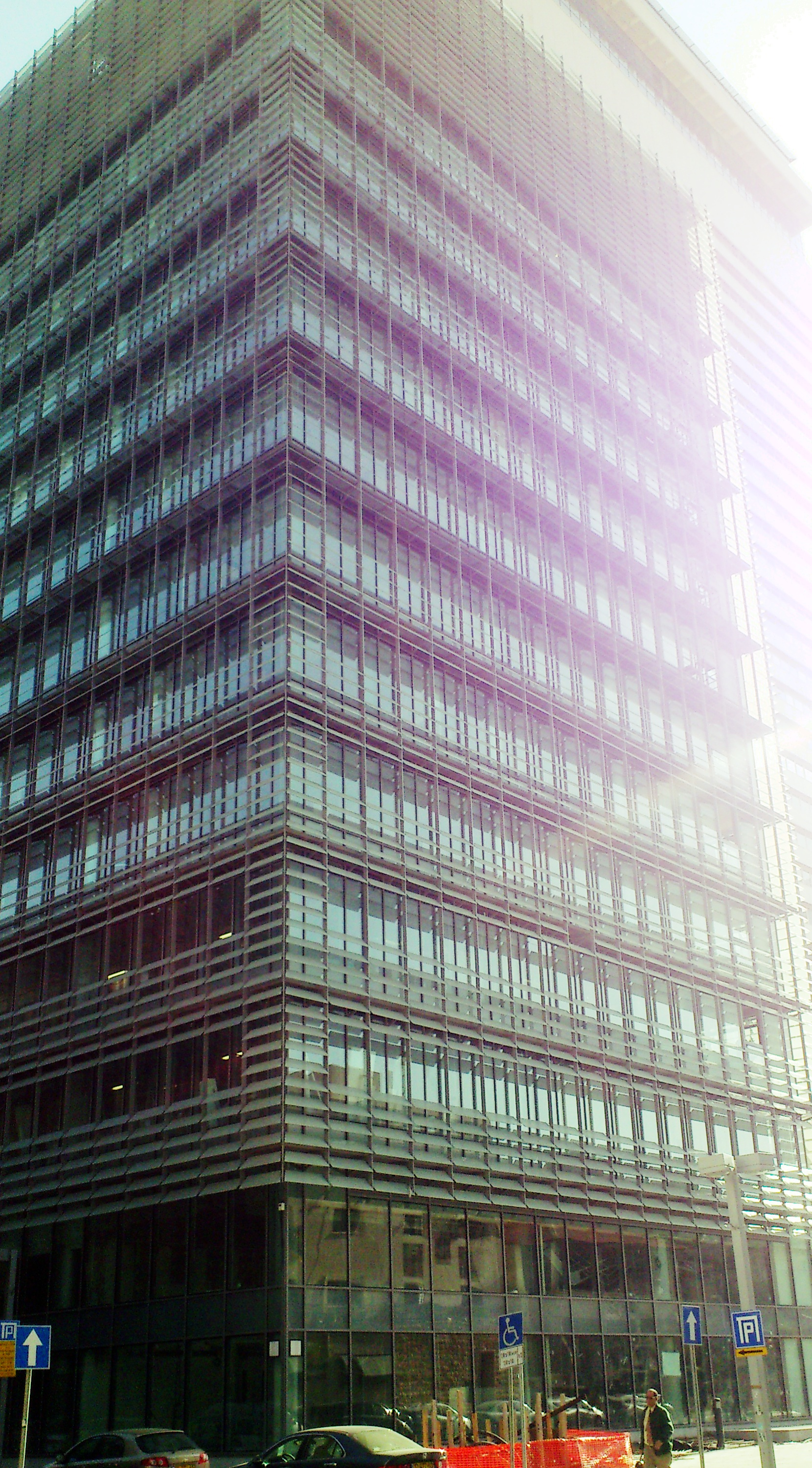
Tel Aviv Stock Exchange

- Adallom
- AdExtent
- Aeronautics Defense Systems
- Africa Israel Investments
- Ahava
- Aladdin Knowledge Systems
- Allot Communications
- Alvarion
- Am Oved
- Amdocs
- Amit, Pollak, Matalon & Co.
- Anobit – acquired by Apple Inc. in 2012
- Answers Corporation
- Any.do
- Arava Power Company
- Aroma Espresso Bar
- AudioCodes
- Automotive Industries

== B ==
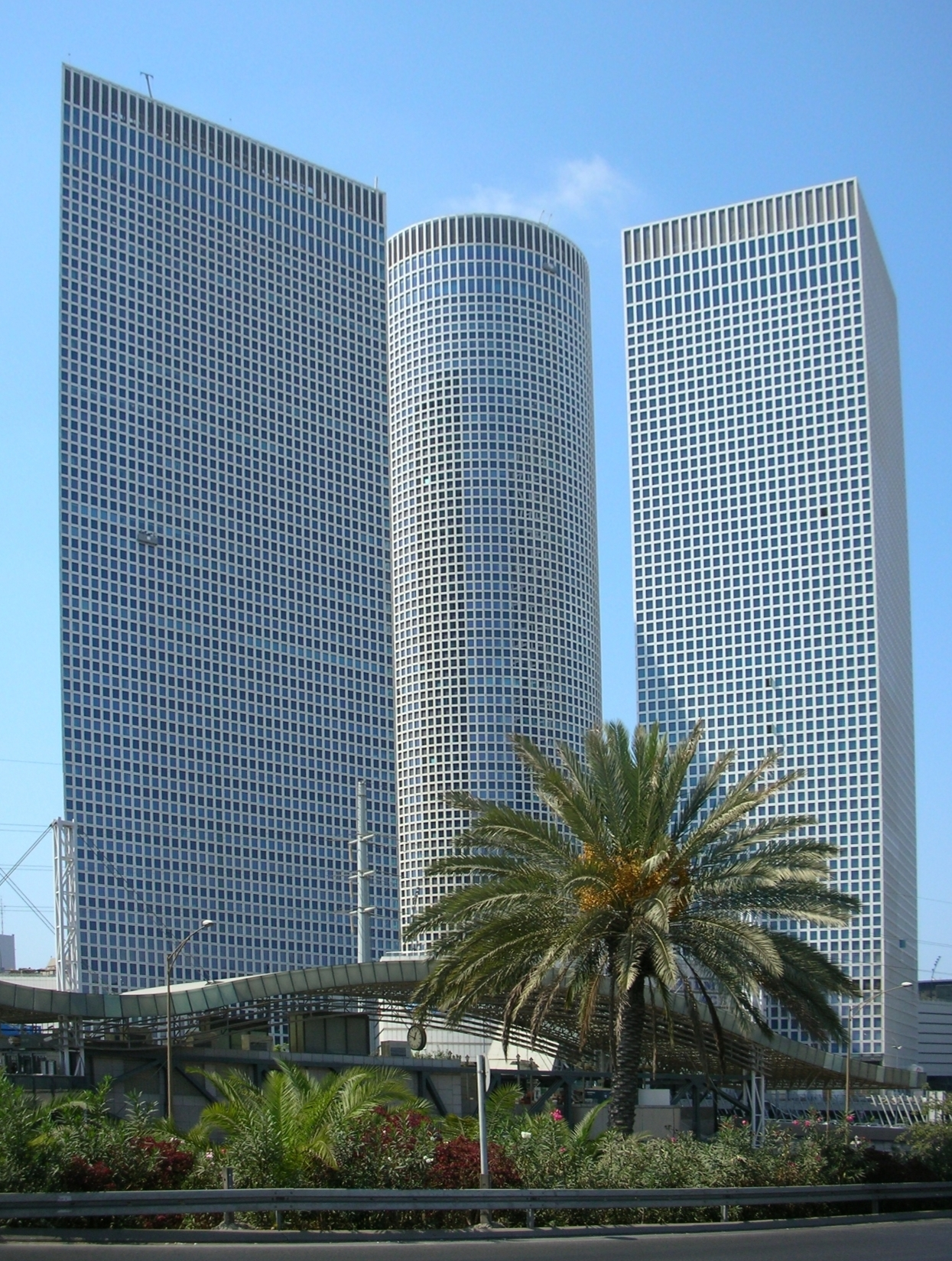
Azrieli Center, Tel Aviv

- Babylon
- Balter, Guth, Aloni & Co.
- Bank Hapoalim
- Bank Leumi
- Bank Mizrahi-Tefahot
- Bank Otsar Ha-Hayal
- Barkan Mounts
- Better Place
- Bezeq
- BioLineRx
- Brainsway
- BUL Transmark
- Burgeranch

== C ==
- Caesarstone Sdot-Yam
- Café Café
- Café Hillel
- CAL Cargo Air Lines
- Carmel Agrexco
- Castro Model
- Cellcom Israel
- Ceragon Networks
- Check Point Software Technologies
- Cimatron
- Clalit Health Services Group
- ClickSoftware Technologies
- Cofix
- Collactive
- Compugen Ltd.
- Comverse Technology
- CyberProof

== D ==
- D.B.S. Satellite Services (Yes)
- Dan Company for Public Transportation
- Delek Group
- Discount Investment Corporation
- Dori Media Group

== E ==
- ECI Telecom
- Egged Bus Cooperative
- Eilat Ashkelon Pipeline Company
- El Al Israel Airlines
- Elbit Systems
- Elco Holdings
- Elisra
- Elta
- Enlight Renewable Energy
- eToro
- Exanet
- Expand Networks

== F ==
- Fermentek
- First International Bank of Israel
- Fischer, Behar, Chen, Well, Orion & Co.
- Fiverr
- Fox–Wizel
- Frutarom

== G ==
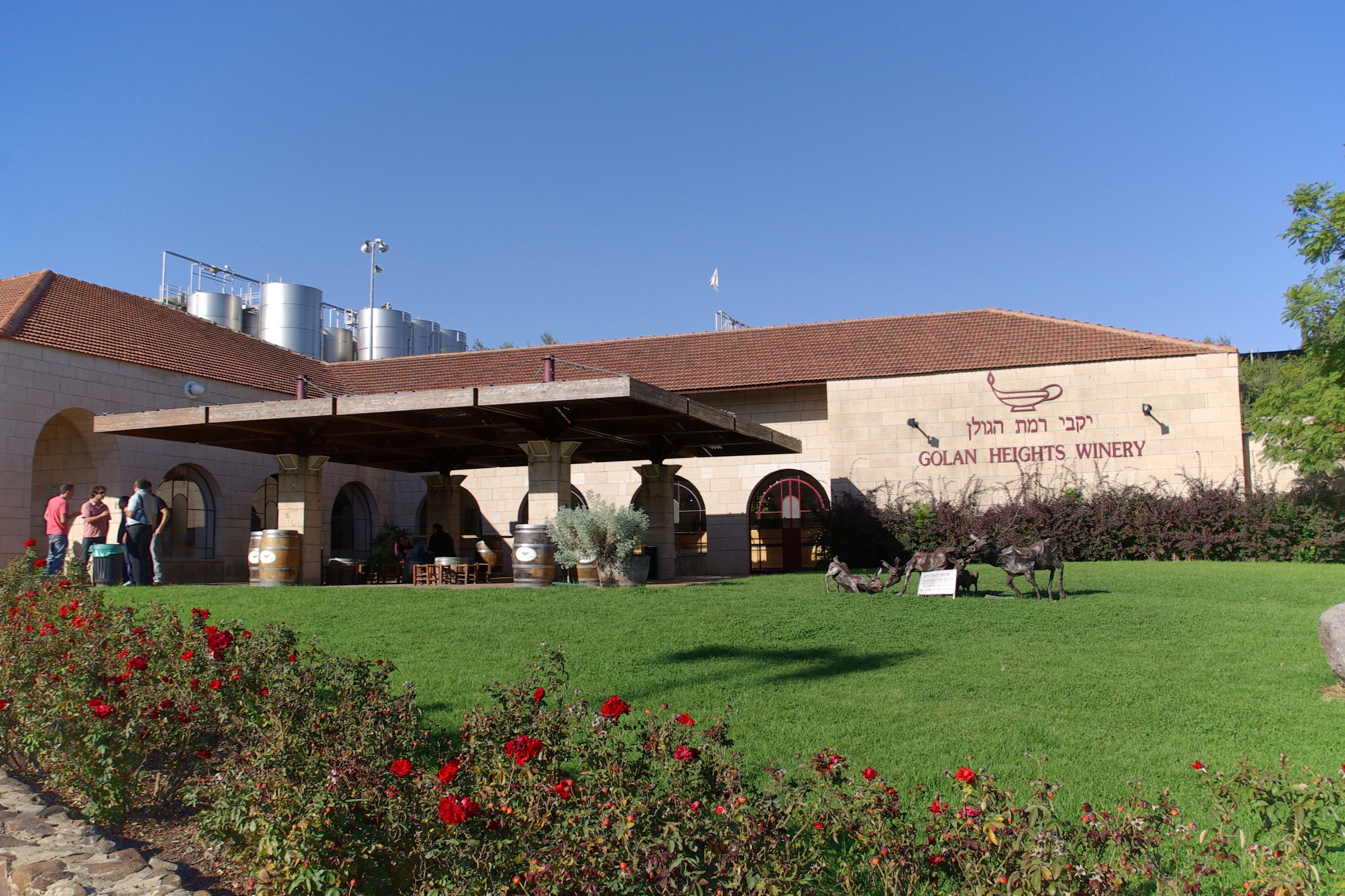
Golan Heights Winery

- Gilat Satellite Networks
- Given Imaging
- Globes
- Golan Heights Winery
- Golan Telecom
- Goldfarb, Levy, Eran, Meiri & Co.
- Gornitzky & Co.
- GreenSun Energy

== H ==
- Haaretz
- Hamashbir Lazarchan
- Harel Group
- Hatehof
- Herzog, Fox & Neeman
- Honigman & Sons
- Hot
- HP Indigo
- HP Scitex

== I ==
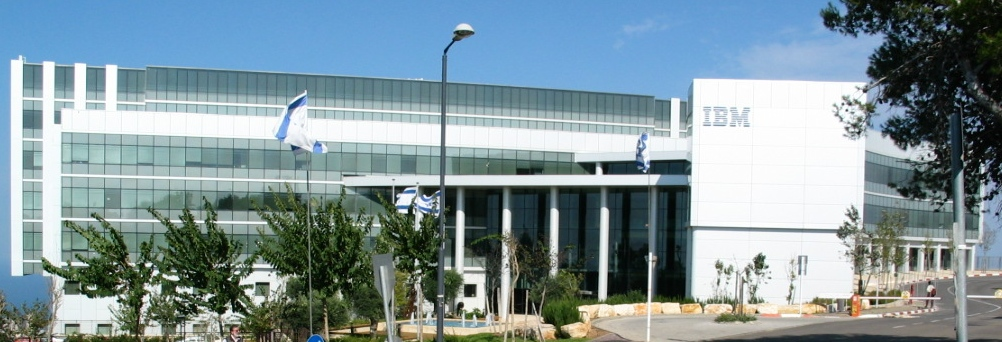
IBM lab in Haifa

- Imi Tami Institute for Research and Development
- Insightec
- IronSource
- ISCAR Metalworking
- Israel Aerospace Industries (IAI)
- Israel Chemicals
- Israel Corporation
- Israel Diamond Exchange
- Israel Discount Bank
- Israel Electric Corporation
- Israel Military Industries (IMI)
- Israel Postal Company
- Israel Railways
- Israel Shipyards
- Israel Weapon Industries (IWI)
- Israir
- Issta

== J ==
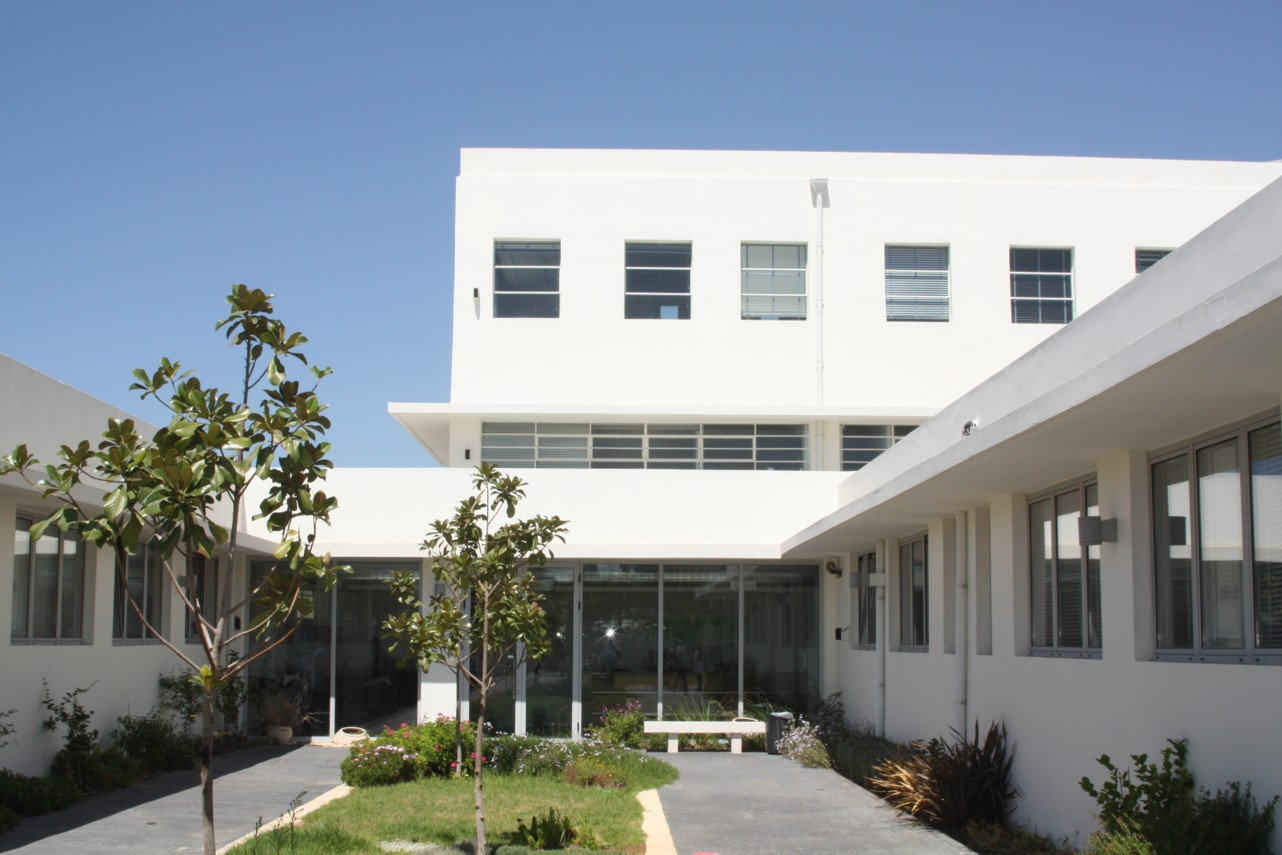
Jerusalem Venture Partners, Jerusalem

- Jacada
- Jerusalem Post

== K ==
- Kampyle
- Kanaf Arkia
- Kapro
- Kavim
- KCPS Clarity
- Keter Plastic
- Kramer Electronics

== L ==
- Leaf
- Lili Diamonds

== M ==
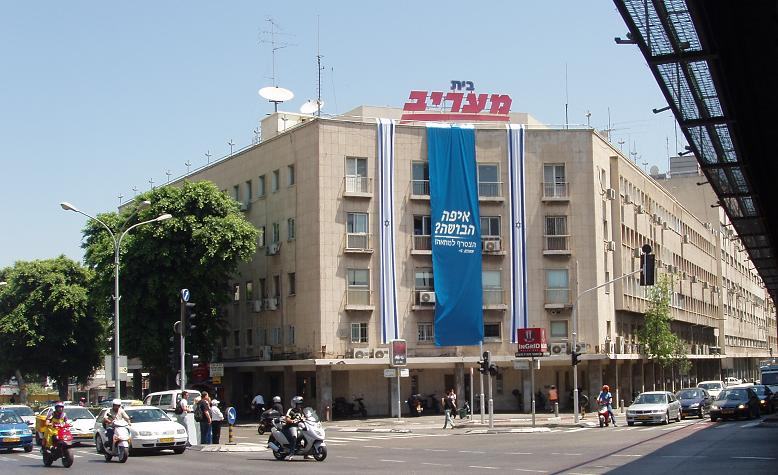
Headquarters of Maariv daily newspaper, Tel Aviv

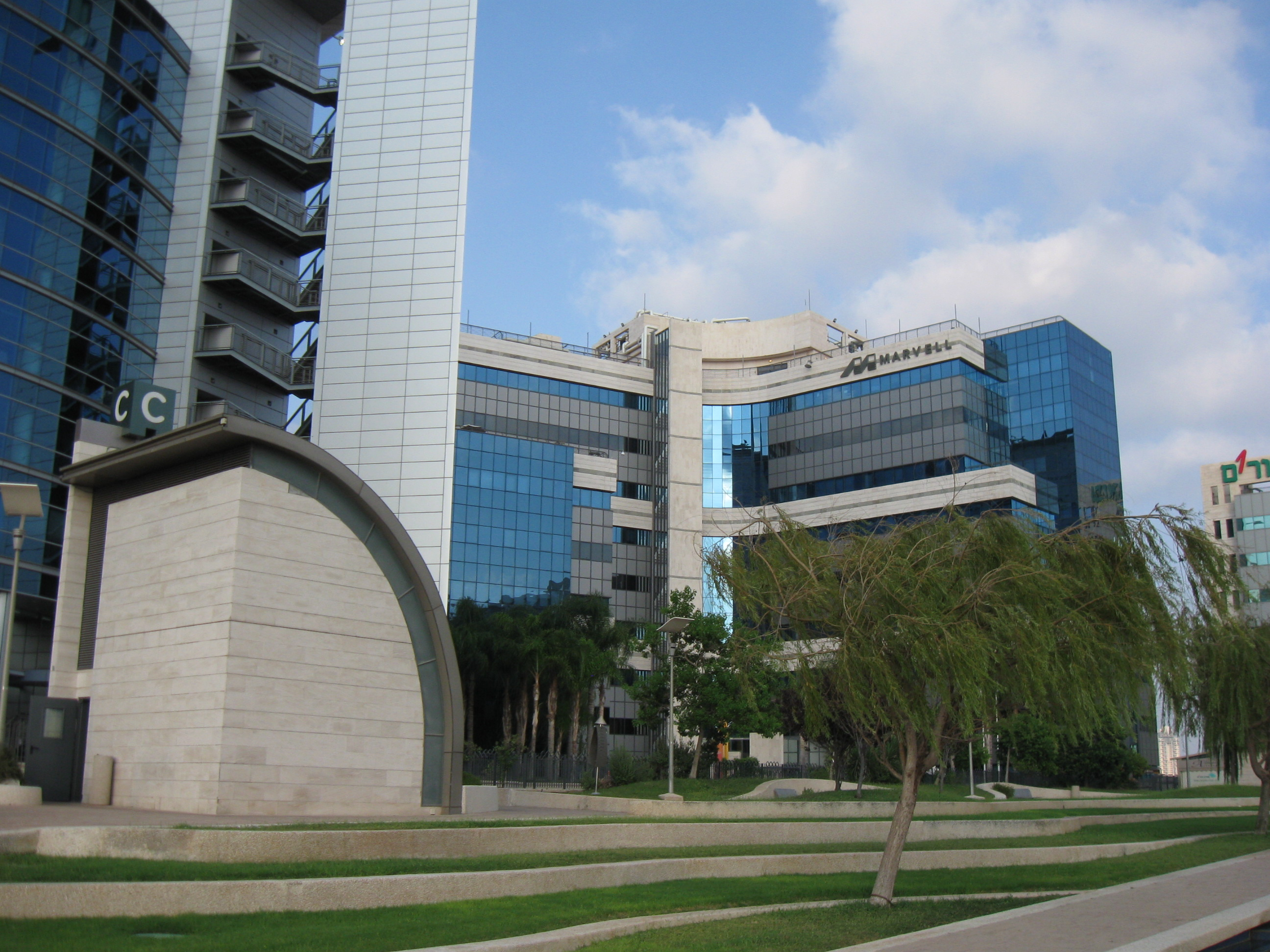
Marvell headquarters, Petah Tikva

- M-Systems - acquired by SanDisk in 2006
- Maariv
- Magic Software Enterprises
- Makhteshim Agan
- Mano Maritime
- Mapa
- The Marker
- Maskit
- Max Brenner
- Mer Group
- Mercury Interactive
- Metacafe
- Metrodan Beersheba
- Metropoline
- Mey Eden
- Migdal
- Mind CTI
- Mirabilis
- Mobileye
- Mobilitec
- monday.com
- Mondelez
- Moovit
- MyHeritage

== N ==
- Naot
- Nativ Express
- NDS Technologies Israel
- Ness Technologies
- Netafim
- NetManage
- NICE Systems
- Nilit
- NMC Music

== O ==
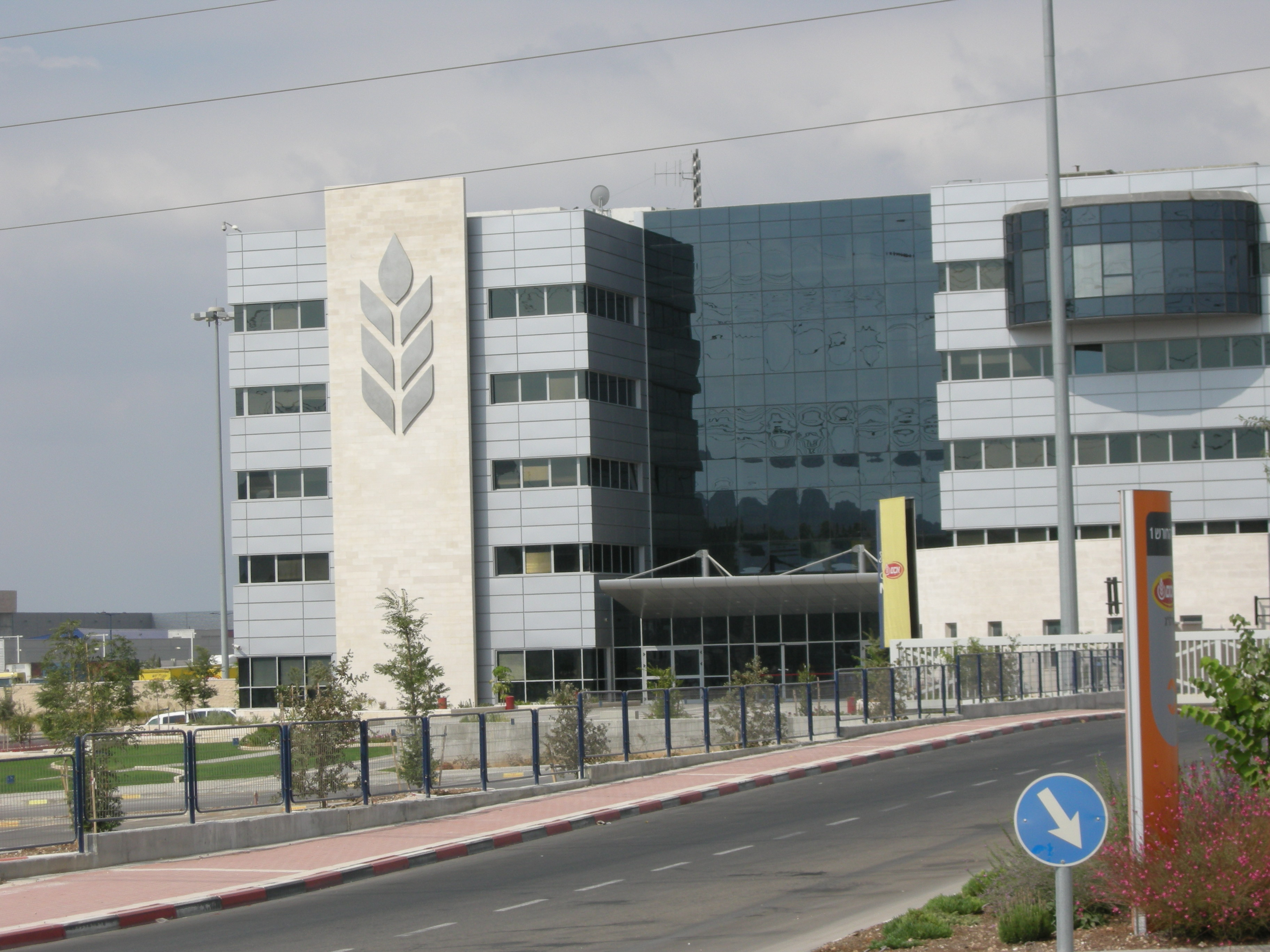
Osem factory, Modi'in

- Objet Geometries
- odix
- Ofer Brothers Group
- Orbotech
- Ormat Industries
- Osem
- OverOps
- Overwolf

== P ==
- Panaxia
- Partner Communications Company
- Paz Oil Company
- Pelephone
- Perion Network
- Phinergy
- Plasan
- PrimeSense – acquired by Apple Inc. in 2013
- Protalix BioTherapeutics
- Psagot Investment House

== R ==
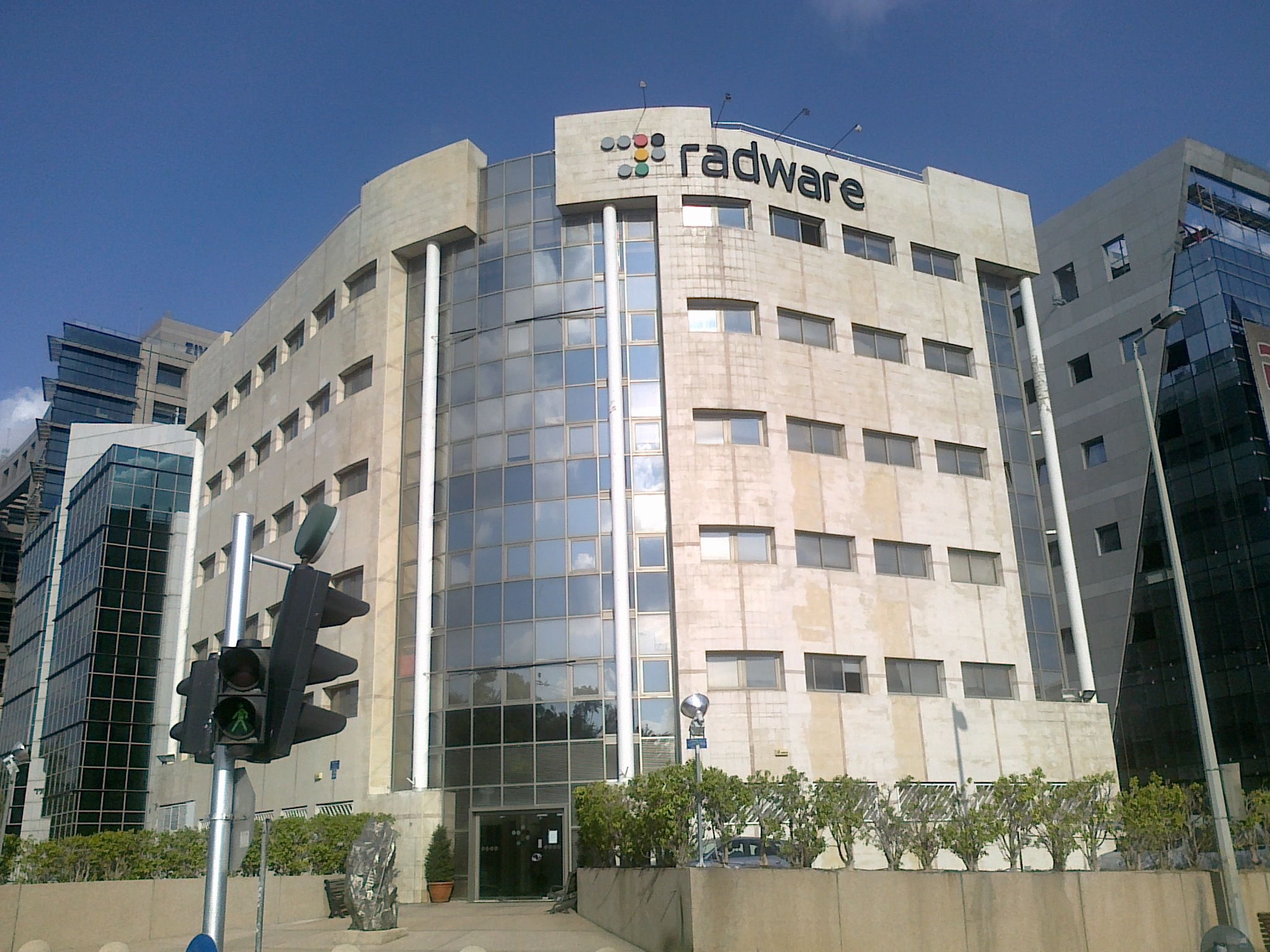
Radware building, Ramat HaHayal, Tel Aviv

- RAD Data Communications
- Rad Group
- Radvision
- Radware
- RADWIN
- RAFAEL Armament Development Authority
- Rami Levy Hashikma Marketing
- Retalix
- Rimon Winery
- Riskified
- Rounds

== S ==
- S. Horowitz & Co.
- Sano
- Scailex Corporation
- Secret Double Octopus
- Shopping.com
- Shufersal
- SimiGon
- SodaStream
- SolarEdge
- Solel
- Soltam
- Sonol
- Source Vagabond Systems
- Spacecom
- StarkWare Industries
- Steimatzky
- StoreDot
- Strauss-Elite
- Sun D'Or
- Superbus
- SuperPharm

== T ==
- Tadiran
- Tadiran Telecom
- Takipi
- Tamir Airways
- Tara
- Taro Pharmaceuticals
- Tawkon
- Tecnomatix
- Tel Aviv Stock Exchange
- ThetaRay
- Tempo Beer Industries
- Teva Naot
- Teva Pharmaceutical Industries
- Tnuva
- Tower Semiconductor

== V ==
- Viber
- Vigilant Technology
- VocalTec

== W ==
- Walla!
- Waves_Audio
- Waze – acquired by Google in 2013
- Wix.com
- Wiz

== Y ==
- Yedioth Ahronoth
- Yehuda Matzos
- Yigal Arnon & Co.
- YVEL

== Z ==
- Zemingo Group
- Zenith Solar
- Zim Integrated Shipping Services

== See also ==
- Economy of Israel
- Tel Aviv Stock Exchange
- List of largest companies in Israel
- List of Israeli companies quoted on the Nasdaq
- List of Israeli companies quoted on the ASX
- List of restaurants in Israel
- TA-100 Index
