= Zangen =

== People ==
- Abraham Zangen
- Gustav-Adolf von Zangen
- Wilhelm Zangen

== Fictional company ==
- List of The Big Bang Theory and Young Sheldon characters#Zangen
