= AirTrack =

AirTrack may refer to:

- Air track, a piece of scientific equipment for measuring uniformly accelerated motion
- Heathrow Airtrack, the original name for the proposed new UK rail links from Heathrow Airport's Terminal 5
- AirTrack in-flight entertainment system; see SimiGon
- Antonov AirTrack; see Antonov An-124
- An object in Japan animation and comic Air Gear
