= Brainsway =

Medical technology company

BrainsWay Ltd.
- Type: Public
- Traded as: TASE: BRIN; Nasdaq: BWAY
- Industry: Medical technology
- Founded: 2003; 23 years ago
- Founder: Avner Hagai (president); David Zacut (chairman)
- Headquarters: Burlington, Massachusetts, United States
- Key people: Abraham ZangenYiftach Roth; Hadar Levy (CEO
- Products: Deep TMS System
- Services: Brain Disorder treatment
- Subsidiaries: Brainsway Inc.
- Website: brainsway.com

BrainsWay Ltd. (Hebrew: בריינסוויי) is an international company that is engaged in the development of a medical device that uses H-coil for deep transcranial magnetic stimulation (Deep TMS) as a non-invasive treatment for depression, OCD, and smoking addiction. The company was founded in 2003 and has offices in the US and Jerusalem.

== History ==
The magnetic coil technology used by BrainsWay's devices, called the "H coil", emerged from research done in the late 1990s and early 2000s at the U.S. National Institutes of Health (NIH) by Abraham Zangen, Roy A. Wise, Mark Hallett, Pedro C. Miranda and Yiftach Roth. Most coils used in transcranial magnetic stimulation (TMS) provide a shallow magnetic field that affects neurons mostly on the surface of the brain, delivered with coil shaped like the number eight. The H coil provided magnetic fields deeper in the brain, and devices using them provide what is called "deep TMS".

The H-coil was patented by the NIH in 2002, and the procedure whereby the H-coil was applied to TMS became known as Deep TMS.

BrainsWay was founded in 2003 in Delaware by Uzi Sofer and Avner Hagai, together with David Zacut, and they set up a subsidiary in Jerusalem, and obtained an exclusive license from the NIH for the patent it filed on the H coil. By 2006 the company had conducted animal studies at Weizmann Institute of Science and had run its first clinical trial assessing safety, at Tel Aviv University.

In early 2007 BrainsWay executed an initial public offering on the Tel Aviv Stock Exchange, raising ₪33 million for a market cap of ₪110 million. In 2010 BrainsWay announced plans to list shares of the company's stock on the Nasdaq exchange but withdrew them in June.

In January 2013, BrainsWay received clearance from the U.S. Food and Drug Administration and from Health Canada to market its deep TMS device in the United States and in Canada as a treatment for treatment-resistant major depressive disorder. Evidence to support this use is tentative; as of 2013 no high quality evidence is available.

In August 2020, BrainsWay received FDA clearance for its deep TMS device for use in smoking addiction. The device has also previously been cleared by the FDA using an H1-coil for major depressive disorder and H7-coil for OCD.

In September 2025, BrainsWay received FDA clearance for an accelerated MDD protocol that shortens the initial treatment phase from 4 weeks down to just 6 days.

== See also ==
- List of companies of Israel
- List of Israeli inventions and discoveries
- Neuroscience
- Science and technology in Israel
