= Doron Levy =

Israeli-American applied mathematician

- דורון לוי
- Occupations: Mathematician, scientist, magician, and academic

Academic background
- Education: B.Sc. in Mathematics and Physics; M.Sc. in Applied Mathematics; Ph.D. in Applied Mathematics
- Alma mater: Tel Aviv University
- Thesis: Topics in Approximate Methods for Non-Linear Partial Differential Equations (1997)
- Doctoral advisor: Eitan Tadmor

Academic work
- Institutions: École normale supérieure (Paris); Paris 6 University (Sorbonne University); University of California, Berkeley; Lawrence Berkeley National Laboratory; Stanford University; University of Maryland, College Park

Doron Levy (Hebrew: דורון לוי) is a mathematician, scientist, magician, and academic. He is a Professor and chair at the Department of Mathematics at the University of Maryland, College Park. He is also the Director of the Brin Mathematics Research Center.

Levy's research encompasses the field of numerical analysis, applied nonlinear partial differential equations, and biology and medical applications, particularly focusing on analyzing cancer dynamics, immunology, and cell motility. He has written more than 100 peer-reviewed articles. He is the recipient of the National Science Foundation Career Award.

Levy is a Fellow of the John Simon Guggenheim Memorial Foundation He is an Editorial Board Member of the Bulletin of Mathematical Biology, Discrete and Continuous Dynamics Systems Series B, Le Matematiche, Acta Applicandae Mathematicae, Frontiers in Systems Biology, Cancer Research, Applied Mathematics Modelling, PLoS One, and Differential Equations and Dynamical Systems. He is the Editor-in-Chief at ImmunoInformatics.

== Education ==
Levy earned his Baccalaureate degree in Mathematics and Physics in 1991 and completed a master's degree in Applied Mathematics in 1994 from Tel Aviv University. His Master's thesis was titled "From Semi-Discrete to Fully-Discrete: The Stability of Runge-Kutta Schemes by the Energy Method". In 1997, he received a Ph.D. in Applied Mathematics under the guidance of Eitan Tadmor, with a thesis on "Topics in Approximate Methods for Non-Linear Partial Differential Equations." Afterward, he held several post-doctorate fellowships at Laboratoire d'Analyse Numerique (University of Paris 6), École normale supérieure (Paris), University of California, Berkeley, and the Lawrence Berkeley National Laboratory.

== Career ==
Following his post-doctoral fellowship at Berkeley in 2000, Levy joined the Department of Mathematics at Stanford University as an assistant professor. In 2007, he was appointed as associate professor of mathematics and a member of the Center for Scientific Computation and Mathematical Modeling at the University of Maryland, College Park. In 2014, he became a Pauli Fellow at the Wolfgang Pauli Institute of the University of Vienna in Austria. Since 2011, he has been a professor at the Department of Mathematics & Center for Scientific Computation and Mathematical Modeling of the University of Maryland, College Park.

Levy served as a Member of the Board of Governors of the Institute for Mathematics and Its Applications (IMA) at the University of Minnesota in 2018 for one year, and a Member of the Board of Directors of the Society for Mathematical Biology from 2018 to 2022. Since 2022, he has been serving as the Founding Director of the Brin Mathematics Research Center at the University of Maryland, College Park.

As of 2020, Levy has been a chair at the Department of Mathematics and the Director of the Center for Scientific Computation and Mathematical Modeling of the University of Maryland, College Park.

== Research ==
Levy's research is focused on mathematical equations and biomedical applications of mathematics with a particular interest in cancer dynamics, drug resistance, drug delivery, immunology, imaging, and cell motility.

=== Numerical analysis ===
During his early research career, Levy worked on developing and analyzing high-order numerical methods for approximating solutions to hyperbolic conservation law and related equations. He developed novel methods for approximating solutions to nonlinear partial differential equations including Euler equations, Navier-Stokes equations, Hamilton-Jacobi equations, nonlinear dispersive equations. Some of the approximation methods he developed used Weighted Essentially Non-Oscillatory (WENO) schemes. He developed a third-order central scheme for approximating solutions of multidimensional hyperbolic conservation laws and 2D conservation laws using compact central WENO reconstructions. In a series of works with Steve Bryson, he proposed new high-order central schemes for approximating solutions of multidimensional Hamilton-Jacobi equations.

=== Cancer dynamics and the immune system ===
Levy contributed to cancer dynamics by formulating a set of computational and mathematical tools designed for specific types of cancer. He discussed the need for mathematical models to understand the complexity of breast and ovarian cancers and proposed a model to explain the failure of transvaginal ultrasound-based screening in detecting low-volume high-grade serous ovarian cancer. In a collaborative study, he investigated the effects of regulatory T cell switching the immune response and identified a biologically testable range for the switching parameter. Furthermore, he presented mathematical models for studying cancer cell growth dynamics in response to antimitotic drug treatment in vitro, to understand the immunogenic effects of LSD1 inhibition on tumor growth and T cell dynamics, and for the interaction between immune response and cancer cells in chronic myelogenous leukemia and analyzes the stability of steady states.

Levy analyzed cancer's immune response mechanisms, particularly in chronic myeloid leukemia, providing insights into the role of the immune response and drug therapy in controlling the disease. He also demonstrated that the autologous immune system may play a role in the BCR-ABL transcript variations observed in chronic phase chronic myelogenous leukemia patients on imatinib therapy. Considering the problem of drug resistance in cancer he suggested a simple compartmental system of ordinary differential equations to model it and stated that drug resistance depends on the turnover rate of cancer cells. Additionally, he extended a model of drug resistance in solid tumors to explore the dynamics of resistance levels and the emergence of heterogeneous tumors in response to chemotherapy. Conducting a study on cervical cancer, he investigated the efficacy of combination immunotherapy using engineered T cells and IL-2. Moreover, he assessed the influence of cell density, intratumoral heterogeneity, and mutations in multidrug resistance, considering the continuum model as the most suitable approach for modeling resistance heterogeneity in metastasis. In collaboration with Heyrim Cho, he also investigated the impact of competition between cancer cells and healthy cells on optimal drug delivery and indicated that in scenarios with moderate competition, combination therapies are more effective, whereas in highly competitive situations, targeted drugs prove to be more effective.

== Personal life ==
Levy is a magician member of the Academy of Magical Arts in Hollywood (Magic Castle) and a member of the Order of Merlin of the International Brotherhood of Magicians (I.B.M.). Throughout his academic career, he has highlighted the connection between performing arts and the academic world.

== Awards and honors ==
- 1998 – Haim Nessyahu Prize, Israeli Union of Mathematics
- 2002 – Career Award, National Science Foundation
- 2013 --- University of Maryland Distinguished Scholar-Teacher
- 2014 – Fellow, John Simon Guggenheim Memorial Foundation
- Fellow of the American Mathematical Society in the 2024 class of fellows

== Selected articles ==
- Levy, D., & Tadmor, E. (1998). From semidiscrete to fully discrete: Stability of Runge—Kutta schemes by the energy method. SIAM review, 40(1), 40–73.
- Kim, P. S., Lee, P. P., & Levy, D. (2008). Dynamics and potential impact of the immune response to chronic myelogenous leukemia. PLoS computational biology, 4(6), e1000095.
- Tomasetti, C., & Levy, D. (2010). Role of symmetric and asymmetric division of stem cells in developing drug resistance. Proceedings of the National Academy of Sciences, 107(39), 16766–16771.
- Lavi, O., Greene, J. M., Levy, D., & Gottesman, M. M. (2013). The role of cell density and intratumoral heterogeneity in multidrug resistance. Cancer research, 73(24), 7168–7175.
- Cho, H., & Levy, D. (2018). Modeling the chemotherapy-induced selection of drug-resistant traits during tumor growth. Journal of theoretical biology, 436, 120–134.
