= Enlight =

Enlight may refer to:

- Enlight Media, Chinese media company
- Enlight Pictures, Chinese film production company
- Enlight Renewable Energy, energy company of Israel
- Enlight Software, American video game company
- ENLiGHT demoparty, now known as Chaos Constructions
