= Matalon =

Matalon is a surname. Notable people with the surname include:

- David Matalon (1943–2025), American film producer and studio executive
- Eli Matalon (1924–1999), Jamaican businessman and politician
- Martín Matalon (born 1958), Argentinian composer and musician
- Moshe Matalon (politician) (born 1953), Israeli politician and member of the Knesset for Yisrael Beiteinu
- Moshe Matalon (engineer) (born 1949), Israeli-American mechanical engineer and mathematician
- Ronit Matalon (1959–2017), Israeli fiction writer
- Salomon Matalon, scout leader in Senegal
- Vivian Matalon (1929–2018), British theatre director
- Joseph Mayer Matalon (Jamaican businessman and philathropist) (born 1959)

== See also ==
- Amit, Pollak, Matalon & Co., a law firm in Israel
