= Barkan Mounts =

Israeli audio and video mounting producer manufacturer

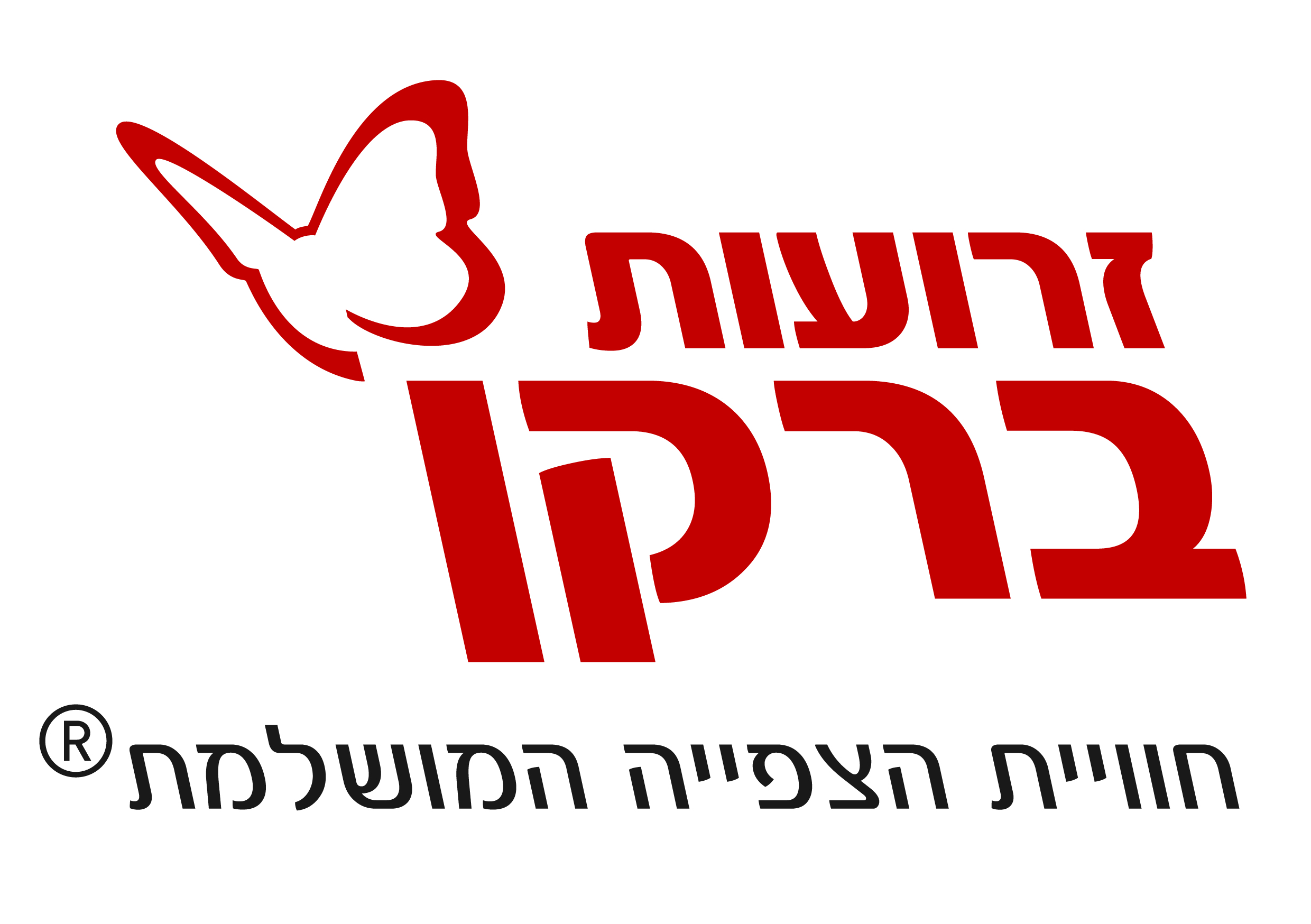

Barkan Mounts Ltd. is a developer and manufacturer of audio and video mounting products.

== History ==
Barkan Mounts Ltd. was founded in 1988 by Lior Barkan as Barkan Engineering Ltd. The company's head office had been based first in the Barkan Industrial Park and in 2000 moved to the Ariel industrial zone near Ariel in the West Bank. In 2011, production was moved to China and tens of workers were laid off. Currently, Barkan exports to over 57 countries worldwide. Barkan manufactures VESA standard mounts for AV equipment. They specialize in the development, manufacturing and marketing of mounting solutions for LCD and Plasma screens and for other consumer electronic products. Their mounts include wall mounted arms for flat panel screens and shelves for stereo components.

== Awards and recognition ==
Two Barkan Mounts products won prizes in the home theater category of the 2006 International Consumer Electronics Show (CES) in Las Vegas.

== See also ==
- Israeli inventions and discoveries
- List of Israeli companies
