= List of largest companies in Israel =

This article lists the largest companies in Israel in terms of their revenue, net profit, total assets and market capitalization according to the American business magazine Forbes.

== 2022 Forbes list ==
This list is based on the Forbes Global 2000, which ranks the world's 2,000 largest publicly traded companies. The Forbes list takes into account of many factors, including the revenue, net profit, total assets and market value of each company; each factor is given a weighted rank in terms of importance when considering the overall ranking. The table below also lists the headquarters location and industry sector of each company. The figures are in billions of US dollars and are for the year 2022. All 13 companies from Israel are listed.

Rank	Global Rank	Rank Change	Name	Headquarters	Sales (billions USD)	Profit (billions USD)	Assets (billions USD)	Value (billions USD)	Industry
1	702	▲ (2)	Bank Leumi	Tel Aviv	5.82	1.87	210.92	15.87	Banking
2	785	Steady	Bank Hapoalim	Tel Aviv	5.64	1.52	205.24	12.88	Banking
3	1035	▲ (1)	Mizrahi-Tefahot Bank	Ramat Gan	4.34	0.98	126.03	9.75	Banking
4	1052	▼ (3)	Teva Pharmaceutical Industries	Petah Tikva	15.85	0.42	47.67	10.63	Pharmaceuticals
5	1177	New	ZIM	Haifa	10.73	4.64	9.84	6.53	Shipping
6	1259	▲ (1)	Israel Discount Bank	Tel Aviv	3.86	0.85	107.66	7.54	Banking
7	1292	▼ (1)	Migdal Insurance	Petah Tikva	11.35	0.41	65.16	2	Insurance
8	1347	New	Phoenix Holdings	Givatayim	8.7	0.6	45.23	3.3	Insurance
9	1593	▼ (1)	Harel Insurance	Netanya	8.48	0.32	38.77	2.74	Insurance
10	1606	▼ (5)	Check Point	Tel Aviv	2.17	0.81	5.94	17.59	Software
11	1630	▼ (1)	Clal Insurance	Tel Aviv	7.96	0.32	39.91	1.73	Insurance
12	1877	▼ (3)	FIBI Holdings	Tel Aviv	1.63	0.2	57.99	1.71	Banking
13	1899	New	Azrieli Group	Tel Aviv	0.7	0.89	13.61	10.92	Real Estate

== See also ==
- List of companies of Israel
- List of largest companies by revenue
