= Institute for Pure and Applied Mathematics =

Mathematics institute

Coordinates: 34°4′13″N 118°26′31″W

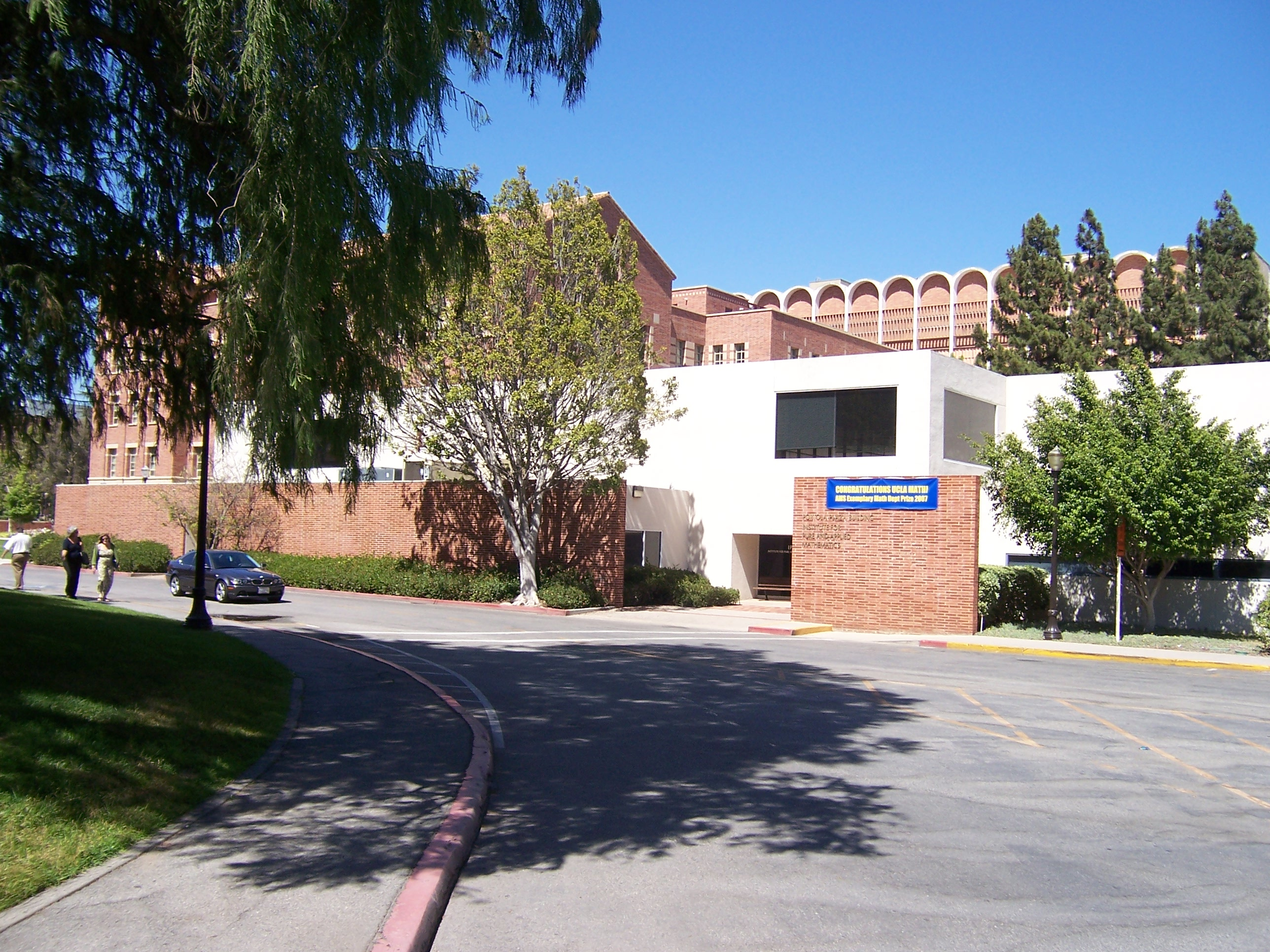
A view of the institute. The building with white arches in the background is Knudsen Hall.

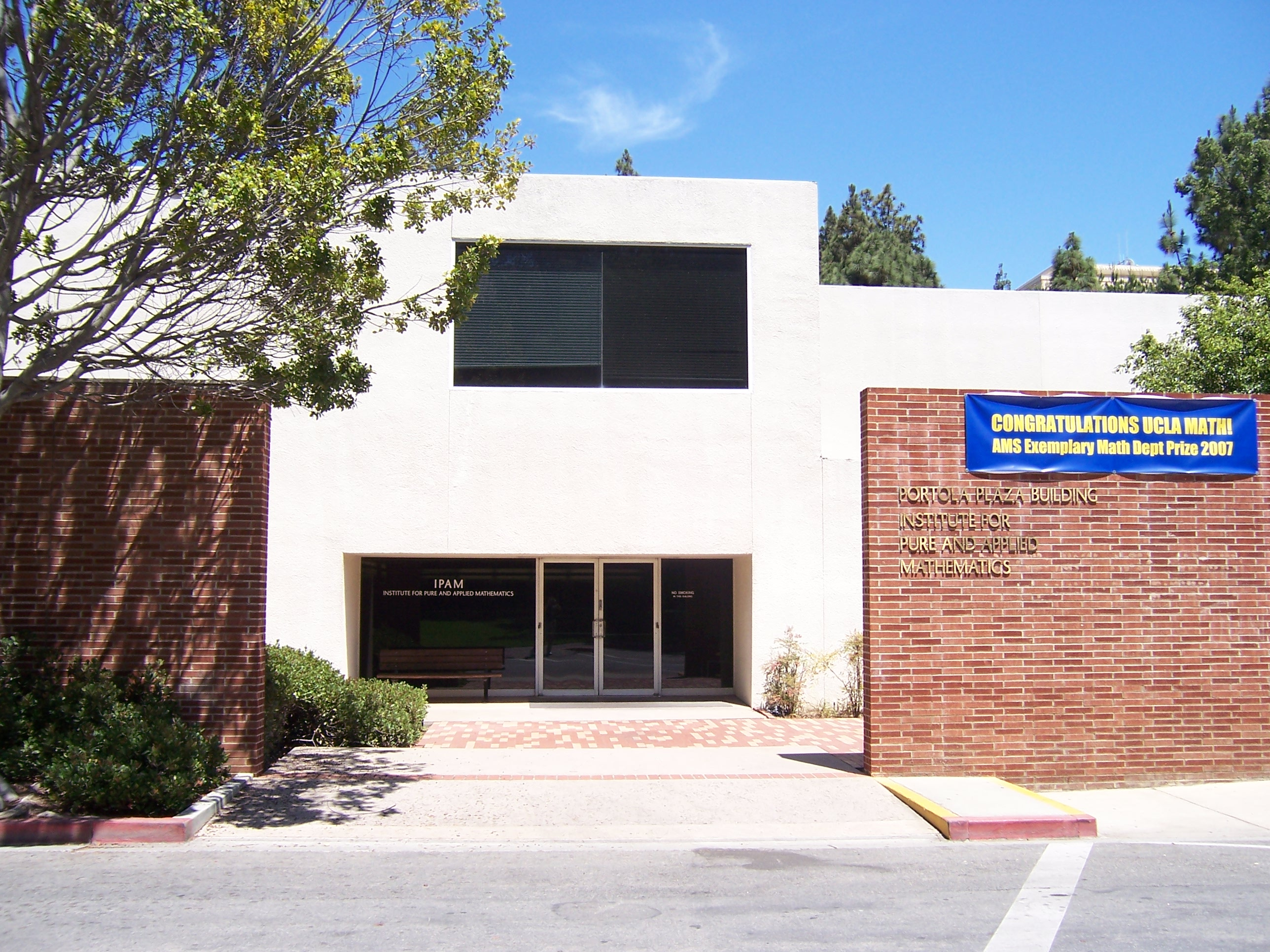
A closer view of the entrance. The blue banner is on the occasion of UCLA's Department of Mathematics receiving the AMS exemplary math department prize for 2007.

The Institute for Pure and Applied Mathematics (IPAM) is a research institute for mathematics at the University of California, Los Angeles. It is funded by the National Science Foundation. With the initial funding approved in May 1999, the institute was inaugurated in August 2000.

IPAM is located on the UCLA campus, in close proximity to the UCLA Department of Mathematics. The building currently housing the institute was designed in 1973 by Pritzker Prize-winning architect Frank Gehry.

== Mission ==
The mission of the institute is to make connections between a broad spectrum of mathematicians and scientists, to launch new collaborations, to better inform mathematicians and scientists about interdisciplinary problems, and to broaden the range of applications in which mathematics is used.

IPAM seeks to bring the full range of mathematical techniques to bear on the great scientific challenges of our time, to stimulate exciting new mathematics via new problems motivated by other sciences, and to train the people who will do this.

== Background ==
IPAM is currently one of seven NSF Mathematical Sciences Institutes in the United States. The initial five year grant was renewed in 2005, and this grant was once again renewed in 2010, 2015 and 2020, for an additional five years.

The institute was co-founded by Tony F. Chan, Mark Green, and Eitan Tadmor; Dima Shlyakhtenko is its current director. Christian Ratsch is a deputy director, and Selenne Bañuelos is its current associate director. Terence Tao is its current special projects director, replacing Stan Osher.

== Programs ==
Every year IPAM offers two three-month scientific programs, or long programs. These programs bring together senior and junior mathematicians and scientists and engineers from the scientific disciplines related to the program. In addition, IPAM supports graduate students, post-doctoral scholars and young academics to encourage their participation in long programs.

The programs consist of three phases: Tutorials from both streams are offered at the beginning. These are followed by four five-day workshops focusing on particular topics related to the overall theme of the program. The programs culminate with a 1-week Oberwolfach-like workshop at the UCLA conference center at Lake Arrowhead, California.

Between the long programs, IPAM sponsors independent five-day workshops on a broad range of scientific themes. During the summer IPAM holds a research program for undergraduates (RIPS) focusing on industrial problems as well as a summer school for graduate students. The graduate student summer school is dedicated to an important scientific theme involving problems of mathematical interest.

== See also ==
- Simons Laufer Mathematical Sciences Institute
