= Center for Scientific Computation and Mathematical Modeling =

Institute at the University of Maryland

Coordinates: 38.990001°N 76.936186°W

The Center for Scientific Computation And Mathematical Modeling (CSCAMM) is a mathematics institute in the University of Maryland, College Park. CSCAMM is located on the UMD campus, in close proximity to UMD's Department of Mathematics and Department of Computer Science.

== Mission ==
CSCAMM is a major research center in Applied Mathematics and Scientific Computation within the University of Maryland, College Park. The center is one of the three sponsors of the department of mathematics's AMSC program. The main mission of CSCAMM is to support and stimulate the interdisciplinary research activities using Applied Mathematics (in particular, scientific computation and mathematical modeling) as their main analysis, simulation, and computational tools.

== Background ==
The center was created in 2001 by the University of Maryland, College Park as a major research project. Eitan Tadmor had been the center's first director from August 2002 to June 2016. Starting July 2016, Pierre-Emmanuel Jabin will be the center's second director. Agi Alipio is the center's director of administrative services. Beside the research funding from the university, CSCAMM works as the major hub of the research network, KI-Net; faculty members in CSCAMM receive funding from NSF, NIH, NOAA, and other research funding agencies.

== Programs ==
CSCAMM maintains an active visitors program and helps organize international workshops and conferences in Applied Mathematics and its applications. During each school semester, CSCAMM also hosts weekly seminars which cover a wide range of mathematical subjects.

== People ==
There are eight faculty members working in CSCAMM: Radu Balan, Jacob Bedrossian, Kayo Ide, Pierre-Emmanuel Jabin, Doron Levy, Dionisios Margetis, Eitan Tadmor, and Da-Lin Zhang. There are two visiting professors: Gil Ariel and Gadi Fibich. The student office usually seats five graduate students who are sponsored and advised by faculty members of CSCAMM. Those five graduate students come from various graduate programs in the university, in particular the AMSC program.
