= Amit, Pollak, Matalon & Co. =

Israeli law firm

Amit, Pollak, Matalon & Co. Advocates and Notary
- Type: Partnership (Israel)
- Industry: Law
- Founded: Tel Aviv, Israel (1956)
- Headquarters: Tel Aviv, Israel
- Key people: Nahum Amit, Founder; Aharon Pollak, Senior Partner; Moshe Matalon, Senior Partner; Doron Levy, Senior Partner; Yonatan Altman, Senior Partner; Eldad Koresh, Senior Partner
- Products: Legal services
- Number of employees: 223 (2018)
- Website: www.apm-law.com

Amit, Pollak, Matalon & Co. is one of the largest law firms in Israel. Its offices are located in Tel Aviv. The firm was founded in 1956 by Nahum Amit.
