= Enlight Renewable Energy =

Israeli energy company

Enlight Renewable Energy Ltd.
- Type: Public
- Traded as: TASE: ENLT
- Industry: Renewable energy
- Predecessor: Sahar Investments Ltd.
- Founded: August 1, 2008
- Headquarters: Rosh HaAyin, Israel
- Key people: Adi Leviatan (CEO); Gilad Yavetz (Executive Chairman)
- Website: enlightenergy.com

Enlight Renewable Energy is a publicly traded company, headquartered in Israel, that builds and operates solar and wind power facilities. Its shares are traded on the Tel Aviv Stock Exchange (TASE: ENLT) and on Nasdaq (ENLT) following the company's United States initial public offering in February 2023. In addition to solar and wind, Enlight develops utility-scale energy storage and agrivoltaic ("agro solar") projects integrating agricultural land use with photovoltaic generation.

== Corporate history ==
Enlight Energy was founded by Gilad Yavetz, Zafrir Yoeli and Amit Paz. The company joined the Tel Aviv Stock Exchange in June 2010 through a reverse merger with Sahar Investments Ltd. Sahar, which prior to the merger was a shell company belonging to Shaul Elovitch's Eurocom Group, subsequently changed its name to Enlight Renewable Energy Ltd.

In 2013 the company received approvals for the Halutziot solar site with 55 MW of capacity. The project entered operation in 2015 and, at the time, was Israel's largest solar project. In 2023 the company repowered and expanded the complex, adding Halutziot 2 with 32 MW of solar and 66 MWh of energy storage. In 2018 the company obtained approvals for Genesis Wind (Emek HaBacha) in the Golan Heights, and commercial operations began in 2023 with 39 turbines totaling 207 MW.

In June 2021 the company acquired a 90.1 percent stake in the U.S. solar and storage developer Clēnera, at a company value of up to US$433 million. In August 2022 the company and NewMed Energy signed a memorandum of understanding for a joint venture to develop renewable energy projects, including solar, wind and energy storage, in Morocco, the United Arab Emirates, Bahrain, Oman, Saudi Arabia, Egypt and Jordan. In February 2023 the company was added to the TA-35 Index on the Tel Aviv Stock Exchange. In 2024 the company broadened its downstream activities in Israel, launching a residential supply joint venture with Electra Power and establishing Enlight Local for distributed energy serving municipalities, commercial clients and agri solar sites.

In February 2023, Enlight completed an initial public offering of its ordinary shares in the United States and was listed on Nasdaq under the symbol ENLT. Over the years the company expanded from Israel into the United States and multiple European markets, including Spain, Sweden, Croatia, Serbia, Ireland, Hungary and Poland. The group is currently organized into three geographic divisions: United States, Europe and MENA (Middle East, north Africa), together with an execution division and corporate headquarters units.

In February 2024, Enlight acquired 80% of Aria, an Israeli renewable energy company focused on non utility solar and storage (municipal rooftops and agri solar). In February 2025 the company won two sites in Israel's first high voltage energy storage availability tender, securing a combined 300 MW (AC) of grid connection that enables roughly 1.3 to 1.9 GWh of storage. In March 2025 the company won an Israel Land Authority tender to develop an integrated 100 MW data center and a solar facility in the Ashalim region. In August 2025 the company completed a private placement of approximately NIS 1 billion and signed financing agreements totaling about US$403 million to support its U.S. growth plans.

On 1 October 2025, founder Gilad Yavetz transitioned from CEO to Executive Chairman, and Adi Leviatan was appointed CEO.

S&P Global Commodity Insights ranked Enlight as the 5th largest developer of utility-scale solar and storage projects in the United States by pipeline capacity.

== Operations ==
Enlight Renewable Energy operates in the renewable energy industry as a developer and operator of solar and wind power facilities. The company also develops and operates energy storage projects and agrivoltaics initiatives alongside its solar and wind portfolio.

== Group activities ==
=== Agrivoltaics (Agro Solar) ===
Enlight develops agrivoltaic ("agro solar") projects that combine photovoltaic arrays with field crops as dual use of land. The company describes an “Agri-First” approach, developed with farmers and agronomists, to maintain agricultural productivity alongside renewable power generation.

The first project of its kind in Israel, which also integrates on site energy storage, was established at Moshav Yesha in the Gaza periphery. In its first growing cycle, wheat was harvested and milled into flour dedicated to the memory of Iftah, who fell in the fighting at Nahal Oz on 7 October. In the second cycle, sweet potatoes were grown and later donated to Leket Israel. These projects allow full agricultural flexibility, integration of precision agriculture technologies, and a low visual profile. The company is advancing additional agrivoltaic projects across Israel.

=== Electricity supply ===
The group includes Enlight Enterprise, which supplies green electricity to customers such as Amdocs, BIG Shopping Centers, SodaStream, Vishay, and NTA (the Tel Aviv metropolitan mass transit operator).

In March 2024, Enlight entered the household electricity market through a joint venture in which Electra Power holds 65 percent and Enlight holds 35 percent.

=== Distributed energy ===
In April 2024, Enlight entered the distributed energy market through its subsidiary Enlight Local (formerly Meidan), which focuses on enabling energy independence for a range of users, including municipal authorities, businesses and organizations, and rural communities.

=== Data centers ===
In March 2025, Enlight won a tender to establish a 100 MW data center and a solar facility in the Ashalim area in southern Israel.

=== Solar ===
Enlight develops and constructs utility scale solar energy projects connected to national electricity infrastructure in Israel, Europe, and the United States.

=== Wind ===
Enlight develops and constructs onshore wind farms. In Europe, its wind portfolio includes projects such as Gecama in Spain and Björnberget in Sweden. In Israel, the company completed Emek HaBacha in 2022, described as the country’s first wind project connected to the national power grid. It also developed the Genesis wind farm.

=== Energy Storage ===
Enlight develops both integrated solar and energy storage projects and standalone energy storage facilities across Israel, Europe, and the United States. The company holds approximately 50 percent of Israel’s battery energy storage facilities connected under the market regulation framework. It also has revenue generating energy storage facilities with a total capacity of approximately 2,000 MWh, with an additional approximately 7,000 MWh under construction or in advanced pre construction stages.

== Notable projects ==
=== United States ===
Enlight announced its acquisition of a controlling (90% stake) interest in U.S. solar and storage developer Clēneras, in June 2021. Through a wholly owned U.S. subsidiary, Enlight paid $433 million to acquire the Boise, Idaho company. Clēnera's founders, Jason Ellsworth and Adam Pishl retain 10% of Clēnera's shares. The company name is Clēnera (without a terminal “s”); the 90% acquisition agreement was announced on 30 June 2021 as Enlight expanded its North American presence.

Selected U.S. projects (solar + storage unless noted):

- Atrisco (New Mexico) — 364 MWdc PV + 1.2 GWh BESS; commenced commercial operations in October 2024.
- Roadrunner (Arizona; also referred to as “Apache Solar II”) — 290 MWdc PV + 940 MWh BESS; 20-year busbar PPA with Arizona Electric Power Cooperative (AEPCO); project debt of approximately US$550 million; tax-equity partnerships of nearly US$340 million; expected full COD by end-2025.
- Quail Ranch (New Mexico) — 128 MWdc PV + 400 MWh BESS; US$243 million construction financing closed; 20-year busbar PPA with PNM; scheduled for completion toward end-2025.
- Country Acres Clean Power (California; SMUD) — ≈392–403 MWdc / 344 MWac PV + 688 MWh BESS; 30-year busbar PPA for solar and 20-year term for storage; construction expected from 2024 with commercial operations in 2026.
- Snowflake A (Arizona; APS) — 600 MWdc PV + 1,900 MWh BESS (phase A of the Snowflake Solar Complex); long-term PPA with Arizona Public Service; commercial operations targeted for mid-2027.
- Wapello (Iowa) — 128 MWdc utility-scale PV; entered commercial operations on 8 March 2021; offtake to Central Iowa Power Cooperative (CIPCO).

In development and under construction: Clēnera's public project list also includes large Arizona complexes — CO Bar (≈1,211 MWdc PV + 4,000 MWh BESS) and the broader Snowflake Solar Complex (≈1,250 MWdc PV + 4,000 MWh BESS) — alongside Buckley (Oregon; 960 MWdc PV + 1,600 MWh BESS) and additional sites across Michigan, Indiana and others, with status ranging from “Under construction” to “In development”.

=== Israel ===
In January 2011 Enlight won a state tender to install photovoltaic panels above the roofs of buildings on Israeli military bases.

In August 2011 Enlight entered into agreements with six communities in the Golan Heights to construct wind turbines on their land, subject to regulatory approval and clearance from Israel's Ministry of Defense.

Enlight led the development of the Halutziot project, one of Israel's largest solar energy undertakings, in the western Negev. At a capacity of 55 MW and an area of 0.8 km^{2}, Halutziot was the largest solar power station in Israel upon its completion in 2015. The projected cost of the Halutziot project is ₪520 million, and the gross income over a period of twenty years based on a rate of ₪0.62 per kilowatt hour is estimated at ₪1.4 billion. Halutziot 1&2 have been operational since 2015 and were among the largest solar projects built in Israel at the time.

In June 2018, Enlight received permission to build Israel's largest wind power station, to be completed in 2020–2021. The plant, located in the Valley of Tears, will generate 96–99 MW of electricity. However, due to various factors, the project achieved full commercial operation in the end of the third quarter of 2023. In October 2023, Enlight reported that Genesis Wind had begun selling electricity to the grid, with 34 of 39 turbines in commercial operation (≈180 MW) and total capacity expected to reach 207 MW. The company describes Genesis as Israel's largest renewable energy project.

By October 14, 2024, Enlight completed commercial operation of a 12-site Solar & Storage cluster in Israel totaling 254 MW of solar generation and 594 MWh of battery storage. Within the Gaza-border communities (Yesha, Re’im and others), Enlight added four projects connected to the grid since October 2023; Yesha and Re’im together account for 16 MW PV and 94 MWh storage, commissioned in 2024. The Yesha energy Stand-alone storage project (operational 2024) comprises 7 MW with 33 MWh storage capacity, as part of the company's Solar + Storage 2 cluster.

In February 2025, Enlight signed a five-year, $22m power purchase agreement to supply clean electricity to NTA, the government-owned mass-transit company building the Tel Aviv light rail and metro. In March 2025, Enlight won Israel's first land tender for an integrated data-center and renewable-energy complex in the Ashalim region. Earlier, in the Electricity Authority's first availability-tariff tender (Feb 2025), Enlight secured grid-connection rights for two battery projects totaling 300 MW AC, enabling 1.3–1.9 GWh of storage.

=== Italy ===
In November 2010 Enlight signed agreements with two Italian companies for the establishment of Italy-based SPVs to lead the development of solar energy farms and rooftop solar energy projects in Italy.

=== Sweden ===
In October 2020, Enlight acquired Swedish wind power project Björnberget, located in central Sweden and expected to contain 60 wind turbines. The first turbine became operational in 2022 and Enlight expected completion by 2023. The project subsequently achieved the requirements to commence commercial operations in 2022–2023 and is among Enlight's largest wind farms in Europe.

== See also ==
- Clean technology
- Renewable energy
- Solar power in Israel
- Sustainable energy
- List of companies of Israel
