= Zemingo Group =

Israeli IoT company

- Company type: Privately owned
- Founded: Herzliya Pituah, Israel (2008)
- Headquarters: 10 Hasadna'ot St. Herzliya, Israel
- Area served: Worldwide
- Key people: Zvi Frank, Executive chairman Tsiki Naftaly, CEO and Co-Founder; Maya Zalcberg, R&D Director and Co-Founder
- Industry: Mobile Technology
- Services: Mobile Application Design, Development and Marketing
- Employees: 100–120
- Website: www.zemingo.com
- Launched: 2008
- Current status: Active

Zemingo Group is a mobile technology company that operates in the field of Internet of Things (IoT), providing design, development and analytics services for enterprises that wish to turn their physical products into connected devices.

Zemingo Group is the largest mobile service house in Israel, based in Herzliya with offices in New York City.

== History ==
Zemingo was founded in 2008 by Maya Zalcberg and Tsiki Naftaly. It started out as an engineering company focused on mobile applications development.

In 2011 Zvi Frank joined the company. Frank co-founded Interwise, a web conferencing company that was sold to AT&T for 121 million dollars in 2007. Frank also produced the Emmy winning documentary "Google Baby".

Zemingo founded two subsidiary companies; the first is PandaPepper that provides analytics and marketing services for digital products. The second is Falcore, a development company.

In 2014 Zemingo acquired 9Design, a New York-based design studio, for 2.5 million dollars, rebranding it as Yellowtale. Among Yellowtale's customers are Clear Channel, Stanley Tools and Eurocom.

Most of Zemingo's customers are located in the US and Europe, among them are FLIR Systems, Securitas Direct, HP, Zero Motorcycles, and Fiverr. In Israel Zemingo provides mobile products design, development, marketing and analytics services for companies such as Viaaccess-Orca, Amdocs, and Kaltura.

Zemingo co-founded several startups, such as Boatbook (seamanship apps for yachts) and ForteeTwo (a platform for rapid development of mobile games).

Zemingo group acquired "Sergata Mobile" in June 2016. "Sergata Mobile", now part of Zemingo Group development arm (Falcore), is a mobile app development company with an IoT portfolio, including companies such as: Verifone, Essence Security, HeraMed, FST

Tsiki Naftaly, Zemingo's CEO, says that the company's annual revenue is tens of millions of dollars. The company employs approximately 120 people.

Among Zemingo's competitors are the American companies MentorMate and Fueled, and the British company Golden Gekko.

== Products ==
Zemingo developed and manages the mobile products for three major security companies: FLIR Systems, Securitas Direct and Gulfstream. Securitas Direct hired Zemingo to develop apps aimed to assist sales representatives in analyzing and improving sales.

FLIR Systems hired Zemingo to develop home security mobile and web apps.

In 2011, Zemingo developed "Traffic Observer", a hit mobile application that records and reports offensive driving for Israel's National Road Safety Committee.

In the wearable computing field, Zemingo developed an augmented reality solution for Fieldbit, as well as an Interface for Imagine Smartglasses company.

== See also ==
- Economy of Israel
- Start-up Nation
