= OverOps =

Software analytics company

OverOps, Inc.
- Formerly: Takipi
- Type: Private company
- Industry: Software analytics
- Founded: 2011; 15 years ago
- Headquarters: San Francisco, United States
- Key people: Rod Squires (CEO), Tal Weiss (founder)
- Owner: Tal Weiss, Iris Shoor, Niv Steingarten, Chen Harel and Dor Levi
- Website: www.overops.com

OverOps was a software analytics company based in San Francisco, CA and Tel Aviv, Israel. The company developed a static and dynamic code analysis technology to analyze code events in real time. The technology's focus is large-scale Java and Scala code bases.

== History ==
OverOps was founded as Takipi in December 2011. Prior to Takipi, Tal Weiss (CTO) and Iris Shoor (VP Product) co-founded VisualTao (acquired by Autodesk Inc in 2009). In 2012 Takipi received seed investment of $700K by private investors. In 2013 Takipi received $4.5 million in venture capital from Menlo Ventures.

On April 20, 2016, it was announced that Takipi raised $15 million in a funding round led by Lightspeed Ventures.

Takipi was renamed OverOps on August 25, 2016, to reflect a greater emphasis on services that support DevOps.

On April 26, 2017, it was announced that OverOps raised $30 million in series C round led by Lightspeed Ventures, with participation from Menlo Ventures.

In 2018, the company announced the hiring of Rod Squires as CEO and move of founder Tal Weiss into the role of Chief Technology Officer.

In March 2023, OverOps was acquired by Harness

== Products ==
OverOps uses a Java agent to perform code analysis and track code changes in real time. Using graph analysis, OverOps maps an application's codebase and the different connections between variables, methods and classes. When a runtime exception, log error or a performance issue are reported, the code maps are used to record data of variable values, methods, threads and JVMs which led to the errors. OverOps is delivered in a software as a service (SaaS) model, where the majority of the analysis is performed in the "cloud". The software can also be deployed in a hybrid model (where collector and agent are on-prem with analytics in the cloud) or fully on-prem for all components.
