= Imi Tami Institute for Research and Development =

Facility in Haifa, Israel

Imi Tami is a private company and the largest industrial chemistry R&D centre in Israel. IMI TAMI is a member of the Israel Chemicals manufacturing concern. IMI TAMI has created a campus with research, analytical and testing laboratories, GMP compliant facilities, a mini-pilot and pilot plants for process development and small-scale production.
