= Panaxia =

Israeli medical cannibis company

Panaxia Pharmaceutical Industries Ltd
- Founded: 2010
- Founder: Dadi Segal, Assi Rotbart, Eran Goldberg
- Headquarters: Lod, Israel
- Key people: Dadi Segal (CEO)
- Products: Medical cannabis
- Number of employees: 150+ (2020)
- Subsidiaries: Panaxia Israel; Panaxia USA
- Website: panaxia.co.il

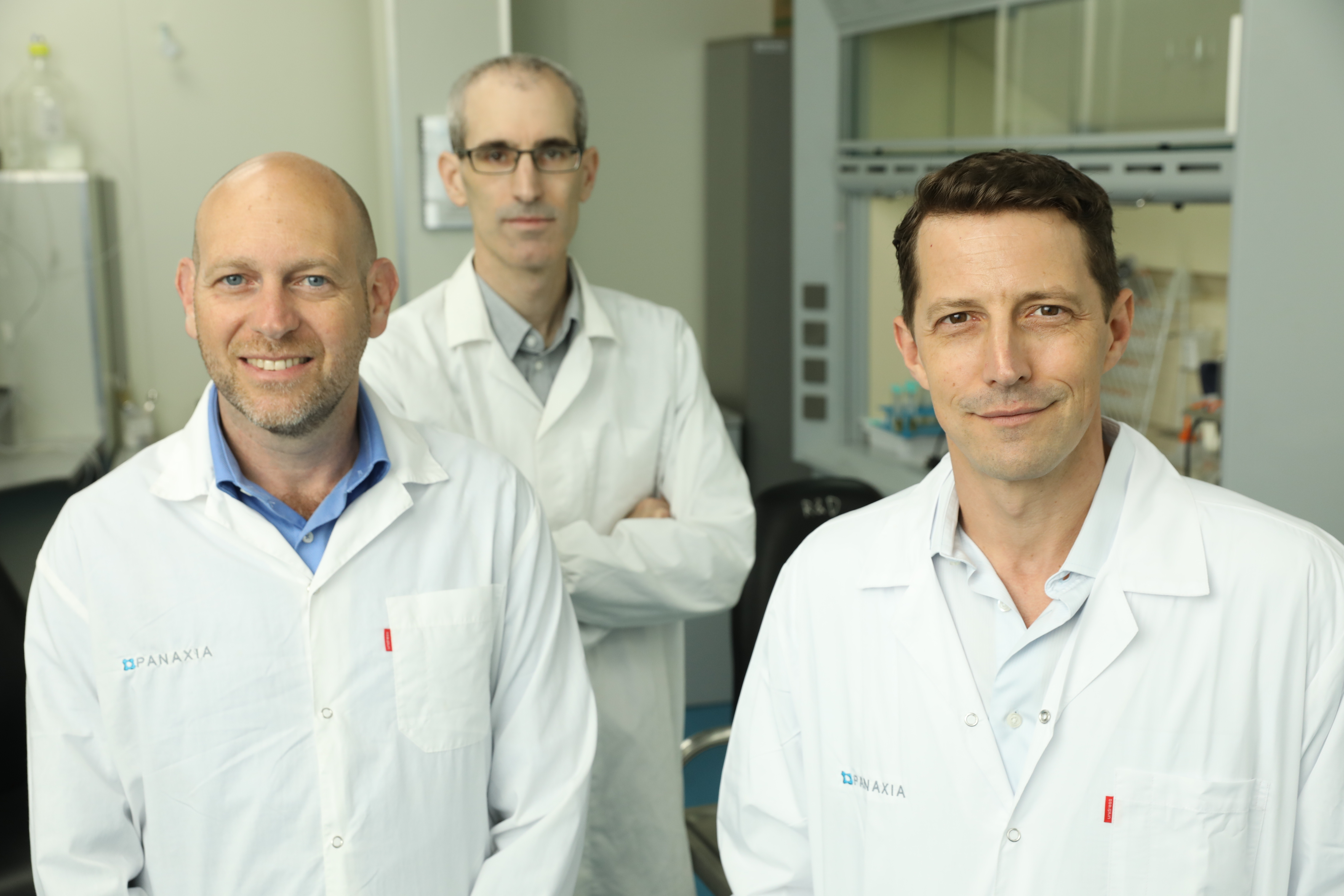
Founders of Panaxia - Dr. Dadi Segal, Adv. Assi Rotbart and Dr. Eran Goldberg

Panaxia Pharmaceutical Industries Ltd., or Panaxia Global, is a global company headquartered in Lod, Israel, that develops, manufactures and markets medical cannabis-based products in pharmaceutical quality. The company has commercial activity in Germany, France, Cyprus and Malta. Panaxia is the controlling shareholder of Panaxia Labs Israel Ltd., which is traded on the Tel-Aviv Stock Exchange. Panaxia USA (a subsidiary of Panaxia Global) manufactures medical cannabis-based products in North America.

== History ==
In 2010, Panaxia was founded as the cannabis division of the Segal Pharma Group, a group of private companies in the pharmaceutical and medical device spaces. Upon its establishment, the company began research and development in the field of medical cannabis.

In 2016, upon the government's announcement of the outline for medicalization of medical cannabis products, Panaxia Pharmaceutical Industries Ltd. was founded by Dr. Dadi Segal, Dr. Eran Goldberg and Adv. Assi Rotbart as a separate company controlled by the Segal Group.

In 2018, Panaxia began cooperating with Rafa Laboratories, which was the first pharmaceutical company in Israel to enter the medical cannabis arena. As part of this partnership, Panaxia manufacturers cannabis oils for Rafa under the Axiban brand. In 2018, Panaxia began distributing medical cannabis products to various pharmacies in Israel.

In November 2018, Panaxia was listed on the Tel Aviv Stock Exchange and signed a memorandum of understanding to merge its activity in Israel into the publicly traded company, Herodium Investments.

In June 2020, Panaxia announced that it had been granted EU GMP standard from an EU Health Authority, which is required for commercial production and export of medical cannabis and medical cannabis products to Europe. Panaxia is the first and only company in Israel to have been granted this. In July 2020, Panaxia signed a partnership agreement with the European pharmaceutical company, Neuraxpharm. Under the agreement, both companies will produce cannabis-based medicines and products for medical purposes and will market and distribute them in Germany.

In November 2020, Panaxia sent its first commercial shipment of medical cannabis products to Australia jointly with its partner, Seach Medical.

In December 2020, Panaxia sent its first commercial shipment to Germany, containing a series of medical cannabis products under its joint brand with European company Neuraxpharm, NAXIVA-PANAXOL.

In January 2021, Panaxia was selected as one of the four main winners in the French government tender for regulation of the medical cannabis industry along with cannabis titans Tilray and Aurora. It will provide patients in the program with oils and tablets under the NAXIVA-PANAXIR brand, together with its partner, European pharmaceutical company, Neuraxpharm.

In February 2021, Panaxia began initial retail sales of its products to patients in Germany and became the first Israeli company to sell its products on the cannabis market in Europe. Additionally, the company was selected by the government of Cyprus to provide medical cannabis products for patients in the country, which will be marketed under the PANAXIR brand. In September 2021, Panaxia announced it would be shifting focus to primarily be exporting cannabis to Europe as opposed to serving the domestic Israeli market.

== Research ==
- January 2019: Panaxia announced a trial for registration with the Israeli Ministry of Health, the first of its kind for the administration of sublingual medical cannabis tablets to evaluate their bioavailability and safety of use. Panaxia's medical cannabis products, which are marketed by the pharmaceutical company, Rafa, are being evaluated in a clinical study and their registration following the trial will herald a revolution for treatment with medical cannabis. The tremendous inherent potential of sublingual tablets is primarily for patients who suffer from chronic/persistent pain.
- February 2019: Panaxia announced a clinical trial for registration purposes with the Ministry of Health to evaluate the bioavailability of administration of medical cannabis through a metered-dose inhaler. The inhaler is made of a vaporizer to which the patient adds the measured cannabis extract for inhalation. The cannabis extract contains a precise dose of the active ingredients, the concentration of which does not depend on the actual inflorescence, but rather is precise thanks to the pharmaceutical production process. The use of the extract ensures a more precise and reproducible intake than smoking.
- December 2019: Panaxia reports excellent results in its clinical trial of the leading products, which prove efficacy of absorption in the blood and safety of tablets, suppositories, and inhaled cannabis extract. Additionally, data indicate that Panaxia's sublingual tablets have a higher absorption rate and lower variance than Sativex, the industry's gold standard.

== Subsidiaries ==
=== Panaxia Israel ===
In 2017, Panaxia Pharmaceutical Industries Israel was founded along with the company's first facility for the production of medical cannabis in Lod.

In June 2020, Panaxia Israel was officially awarded EU GMP certification and became the first medical cannabis company in Israel to be EU GMP-certified. This certification is required for the manufacture, export and marketing of medicines within the European Union.

=== Panaxia USA ===
Panaxia USA was founded in 2016. The company established the first pharmaceutical cannabis facility in the United States, in Bernalillo County, New Mexico. The facility is used for the production of smokeless medicines and medicinal preparations. Ultra Health, New Mexico's largest and leading medical cannabis distributor, markets and distributes the medicines and preparations produced at the facility.

== See also ==
- Cannabis in Israel
