= Odix =

Israeli cybersecurity company

odix
- Industry: Computer Software
- Founded: 2009
- Founders: Oren Eytan, David Geva
- Headquarters: HaMelacha St 19, Rosh Haayin, 4809151, Israel
- Website: https://www.odi-x.com/

odix, incorporated as Operations & Data Integrity Ltd., is an Israeli-based company specialising in cybersecurity. The company was founded in 2009 in Rosh HaAyin by Oren Eytan and David Geva, former Israel Defence Forces officers. It develops anti-malware tools.

== Overview ==
odix is best known for its FileWall, a SaaS that provides file sanitization and deep file analysis capabilities to Microsoft 365, complementing its Exchange online protection against file-based attacks, that also integrates with SharePoint, OneDrive, and Teams as a native application. It was founded in 2009 as a service company and was split into two nine years later, in 2018. In September 2019, the European Commission awarded odix €2M under the EU's Horizon 2020 SME research and innovation program.

In 2020, the company raised $2.1 million in a funding round led by private investors and entrepreneur Efraim Landa.

In September 2020, odix launched its FileWall for file sanitization and file analysis to Microsoft products. In the same month the company joined the Microsoft Intelligent Security Association (MISA).
