= Eitan Tadmor =

Israeli American mathematician

- איתן תדמור
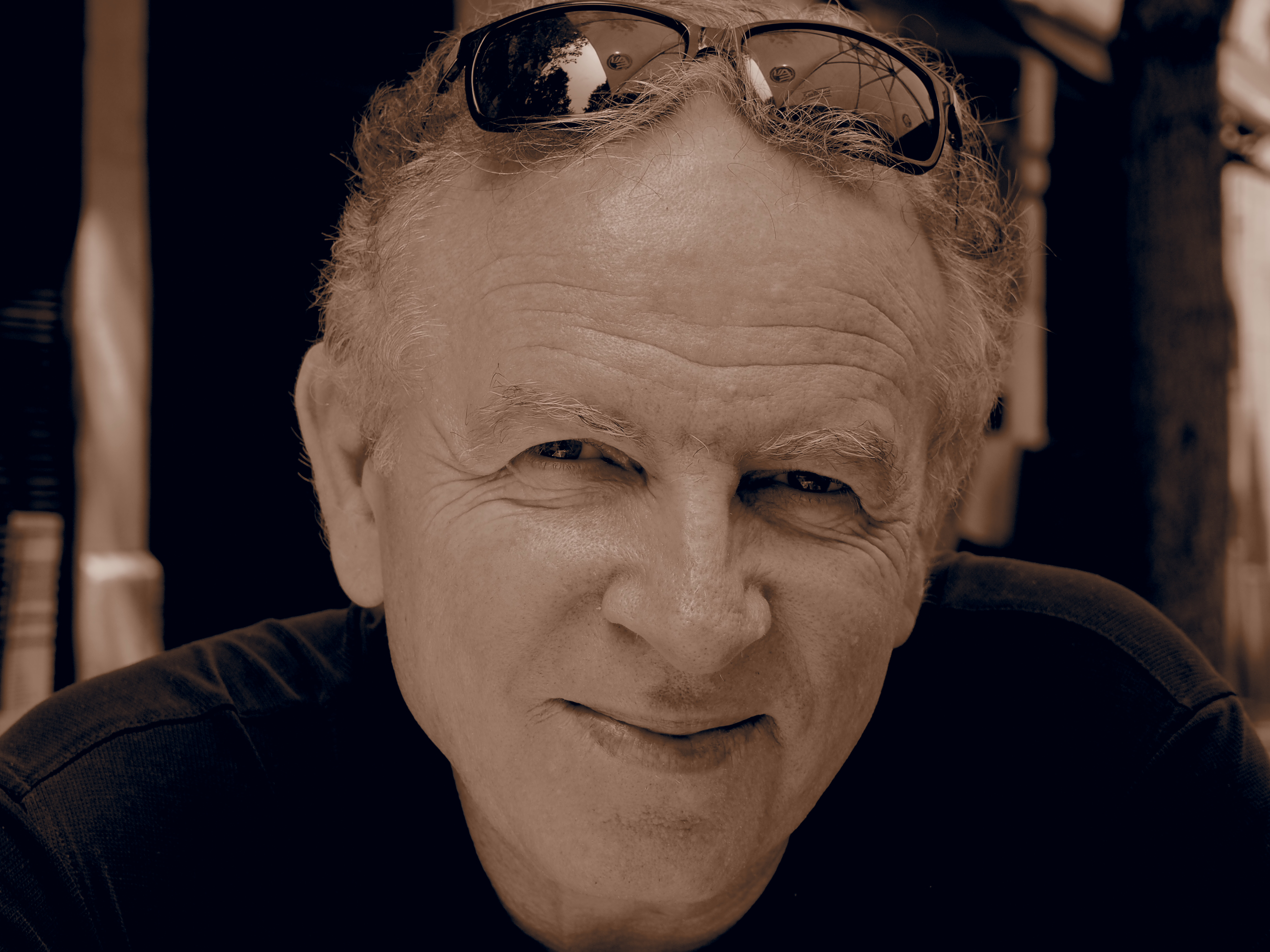
- Born: May 4, 1954 (age 72)
- Known for: central schemes Entropy stability Spectral viscosity Hierarchical decompositions Self-organized dynamics
- Scientific career
- Fields: Applied Mathematics
- Workplaces: Tel-Aviv University, UCLA, University of Maryland, College Park
- Doctoral advisor: Saul Abarbanel

Eitan Tadmor (Hebrew: איתן תדמור; born May 4, 1954) is a distinguished university professor at the University of Maryland, College Park. His work has featured contributions to the theory and computation of partial differential equations with diverse applications to shock wave, kinetic transport, incompressible flows, image processing, and self-organized collective dynamics.

== Academic biography ==
Tadmor completed his mathematical studies (BSc, 1973, MSc, 1975, PhD, 1978) at Tel-Aviv University. From 1980 to 1982, he was a Bateman Research Instructor in Caltech. He returned to his alma mater, and held professorship positions at Tel-Aviv University during 1983–1998, where he chaired the Department of Applied Mathematics (1991–1993). He moved to UCLA (1995–2002), where he was the founding co-director of the NSF Institute for Pure and Applied Mathematics (IPAM) (1999–2001). In 2002 he joined the University of Maryland, College Park, serving as the founding Director of the university Center for Scientific Computation and Mathematical Modeling (CSCAMM), (2002–2016). He is on the faculty of the Department of Mathematics, the Institute for Physical Sciences and Technology and CSCAMM. In 2012 he was awarded as the PI of the NSF Research network "Kinetic Description of Emerging Challenges in Natural Sciences" (KI-Net) (2012–2018).

== Research contributions ==
Tadmor has made contributions to the development of high-resolution methods for nonlinear conservation laws, introducing the classes of central schemes, entropy stable schemes and spectral viscosity methods. He was involved in work on kinetic theories and critical thresholds phenomena in nonlinear transport models. He introduced novel ideas of multi-scale hierarchical descriptions of images, and is leading an interdisciplinary program on self-collective dynamics with applications to flocking and opinion dynamics.

Tadmor has been an adviser of more than 30 PhD students and postdoctoral fellows.

== Honors ==
Tadmor was listed on the 2003 ISI most cited researchers in Mathematics. He has given an invited lecture at the 2002 International Congress of Mathematicians (ICM) (Beijing), plenary addresses in the international conferences on hyperbolic problems (Zürich 1990 and Beijing 1998), and the 2008 Foundations of Computational Mathematics meeting in Hong Kong, and the SIAM invited address at the 2014 Joint Mathematical meeting in Baltimore.

In 2012 he was in the inaugural class of Fellows of the American Mathematical Society. In 2015 he was awarded the SIAM-ETH Henrici prize for ″original, broad and fundamental contributions to the applied and numerical analysis of nonlinear differential equations and their applications in areas such as fluid dynamics, image processing and social dynamics". He was named a SIAM Fellow in the 2021 class of fellows, "for original, broad, and fundamental contributions to applied and computational mathematics, including conservation laws, kinetics, image processing, and social dynamics". In 2022 he was awarded the Norbert Wiener Prize in Applied Mathematics. and delivered the 2022 AMS Josiah Willard Gibbs Lectureship.
