= Tawkon =

Israeli made smartphone application

- Original authors: Tawkon, LTD
- Developers: Tawkon, LTD
- Release: October 10, 2010
- Operating system: Android
- Available in: English, Spanish, French, Traditional Chinese, Mandarin Chinese
- Type: mobile application
- License: Proprietary
- Website: www.tawkon.com

Tawkon (pronounced “talk on”) is a free smartphone application developed by Israeli-based startup Tawkon LTD. The application tracks user's exposure to phone radiation, and alerts users when radiation levels spike.

== History ==
Tawkon was founded by Israeli entrepreneurs Gil Friedlander, Amit Lubovsky and Ori Goshen in 2009. In 2010, Tawkon launched an iPhone app that was rejected by Apple. In 2010, a beta Android app was launched and the full version in April 2012.

== Features and Functionality ==
Tawkon makes a prediction of radiation exposure based on a proprietary algorithm. A weak network signal means a phone has to boost its radio frequency output in order to make and receive calls. Tawkon uses an algorithm that takes into account network, signal strength, phone model, and other data, to predict this boost and alerts the user when there is a spike in RF output.

== Certification ==
Tawkon was tested by the FCC certified electromagnetic-field-testing company Satimo. Based on the results of these tests it was concluded that Tawkon's algorithm is able to predict SAR levels almost as well as actual radiation-detecting equipment. Satimo measured SAR on various phones according to the IEEE standard required by the FCC for any phone made available on the commercial market. The testing process used a precise sensor and a “SAM Phantom” (designed to simulate the human body) to assess the amount of radiation absorbed into the body.

== See also ==
- Science and technology in Israel
