= Kapro =

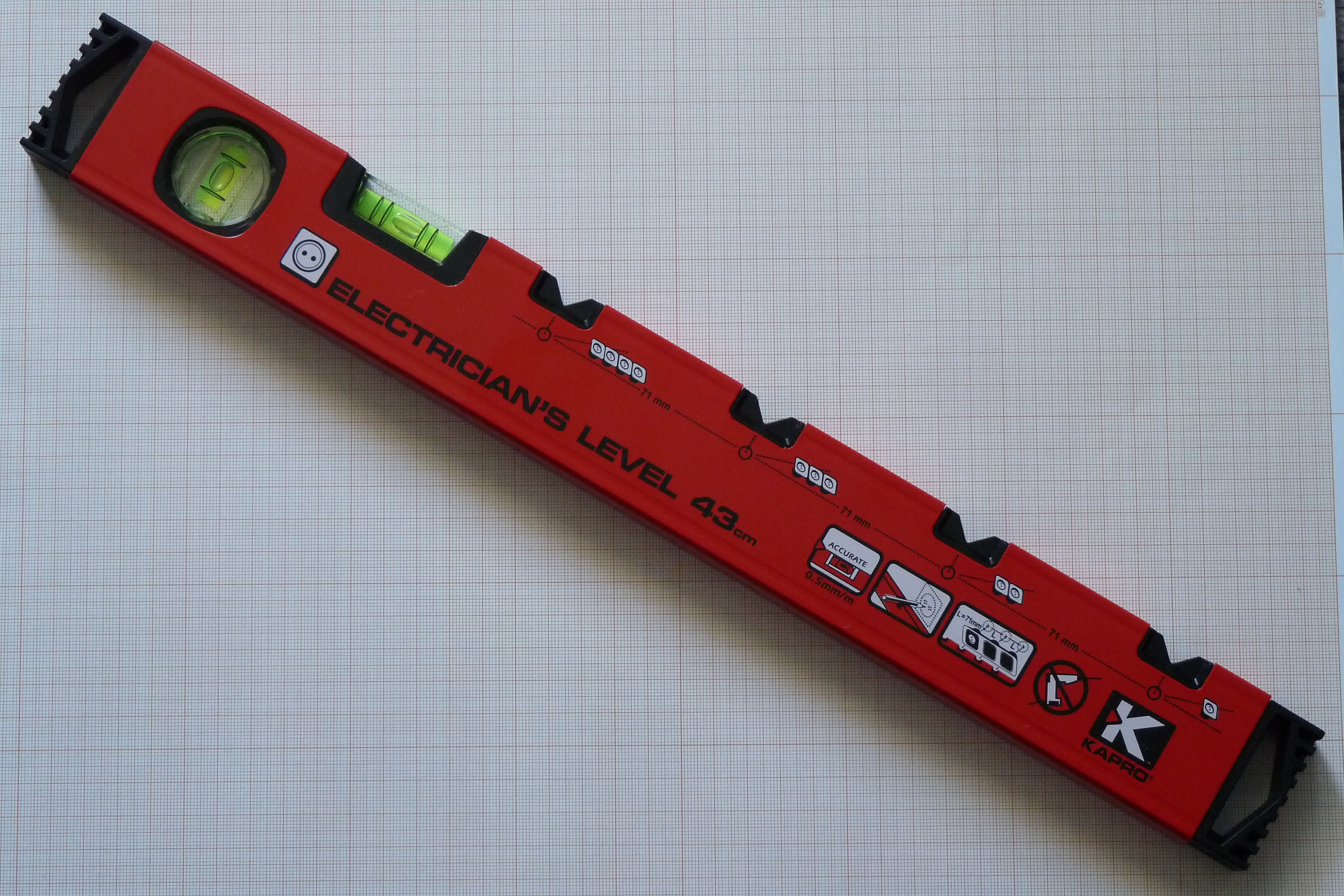
Kapro spirit level

Kapro Industries Ltd is an Israeli manufacturer of spirit levels, laser levels, and layout and marking tools for the professional and DIY markets. Kapro is headquartered at Kibbutz Kadarim in northern Israel and is majority owned by Kapro Holdings, with subsidiaries in the USA (Kapro Tools Inc.) and China (Kapro China Ltd.).

== History ==
The company was founded in 1974 and renamed Kapro (Kadarim Products) in 1990. Kapro manufactures spirit levels, laser levels and layout and marking tools. Kapro is the registered trademark of Kapro Industries and its subsidiaries. The best known Kapro product is the Plumb Site vial viewer.

Kapro utilizes Systematic Inventive Thinking (S.I.T.) as a system for developing inventive ideas and products from within the company.

In 2004, Kapro's CEO Paul Steiner gave the "State of the Industry" address at the annual convention of The Specialty Tools and Fasteners Distributors Association, on the topic of Innovation.

== Community projects ==
In 2010, Kapro won an award from the Manufacturers Association of Israel for its contribution to the community. Kapro's projects include coordination of an educational clean-up project in the Zalmon Riverbed involving local school groups, and volunteer work at the Machanayim center for people with special intellectual needs.
