= Lili Diamonds =

Israeli straight-edge diamond manufacturer

- Type: Privately Held Company
- Industry: Diamonds; Jewelry by Lili Jewelry
- Founded: 1981
- Founder: Siman-Tov Brothers
- Headquarters: Ramat Gan, Israel
- Area served: Worldwide
- Products: Rough Diamonds; Polished Diamonds; Jewelry; Watches
- Divisions: Polished Diamonds (Est. 1981); Rough Diamonds (Est. 1981); Jewelry (Est. 2000); Watches (Est. 2002)
- Subsidiaries: Hong Kong; New York City, United States
- Website: lilidiamonds.com

Lili Diamonds is an Israeli manufacturer of straight-edged diamonds based in Tel Aviv, Israel.

Lili Diamonds was established by Siman-Tov brothers (Jacob, Itzak and Avraham) in 1981.

The company owns globally registered patents for diamond cuts they developed, such as Meteor Cut®, Crisscut®, Crisscut® Cushion and Wondercut®. In addition, the company manufactures traditionally cut diamonds (i.e.Princess Cut, Emerald Cut, Square Emerald Cut and Cushion Cut).

The company's head office is located in Israel, with affiliates based in New York and Hong Kong. Lili Diamonds operates a polishing workshop in Israel employing over 100 craftsmen.

== See also ==
- Israeli diamond industry
