= SimiGon =

- Company type: Public
- Traded as: LSE: SIM
- Industry: computer simulation
- Founded: 1998
- Headquarters: North American HQ in Orlando, Florida
- Key people: Ofir Baharav, President and CEO
- Products: SIMbox, AirBook, AirTrack, KnowBook
- Revenue: US$10 million (2013)
- Website: www.simigon.com

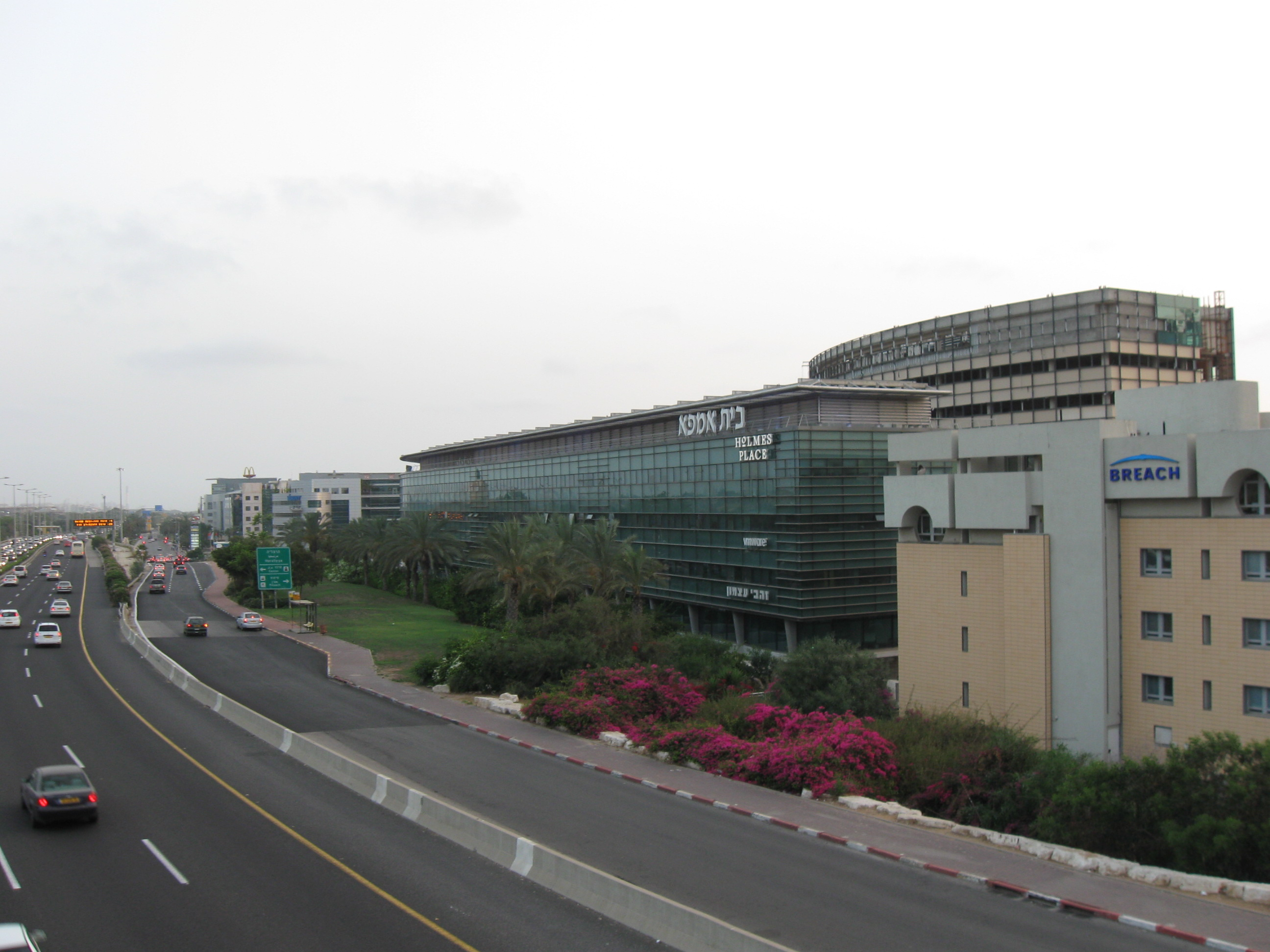
SimiGon's development center in Herzliya, Israel

SimiGon LTD, a technology company who Merged with Power Breezer to form Maxify in April 2022, is a provider of a simulation development platform, SIMbox, used by companies to create 3D simulation training applications. The company was listed on the London Stock Exchange since December 2006 until the merger in 2022.

== History ==
SimiGon was founded in Herzliya, Israel by former Israeli Air Force flight instructors, primarily with backgrounds in the F-16 Fighting Falcon. Its North American headquarters is located in the Central Florida Research Park in Orlando, Florida.

SimiGon began marketing its product, AirBook, in 1998 to air forces around the world. Once the company went public in December 2006 on the London Stock Exchange, it began to branch out, and market the software application on which the AirBook was created. This was called SIMbox. SIMbox is a software platform, and therefore, companies can use its architecture and rebrand it, as Lockheed Martin's NxTrain program has done.

SimiGon was also selected for several international training programs. On June 8, 2007 SimiGon led the slide of the Small Caps on the London Stock Exchange. On July 9, 2007, SimiGon announced that the NxLearn Learning Management System, based on SIMbox, was selected for the F-35 Lightning II Joint Strike Fighter (JSF) program.

SIMbox has also been used to create AirTrack, a commercial use of the core simulation technology. AirTrack is an in-flight entertainment system designed to allow passengers a view of the aircraft's position in the air, what other passengers can see out of other windows, etc.

In September 2011, SimiGon won a contract to supply the US Air Force Air Education and Training Command pilot training systems.

== Products ==
- SIMbox is a distributed simulation solutions for defense and civilian applications; it is a personal computer (PC)-based platform for creating, managing, and deploying simulation-based content across multiple domains. SimiGon's client base includes training and simulation systems providers, as well as over 20 air forces, and commercial airlines worldwide.

== Selected Customers ==
- Lockheed Martin
- BAE Systems Australia
- Canadian Air Force
- Australian Air Force
- Israeli Air Force
