= Abraham Zangen =

Israeli researcher (born 1969)

- אברהם צנגן
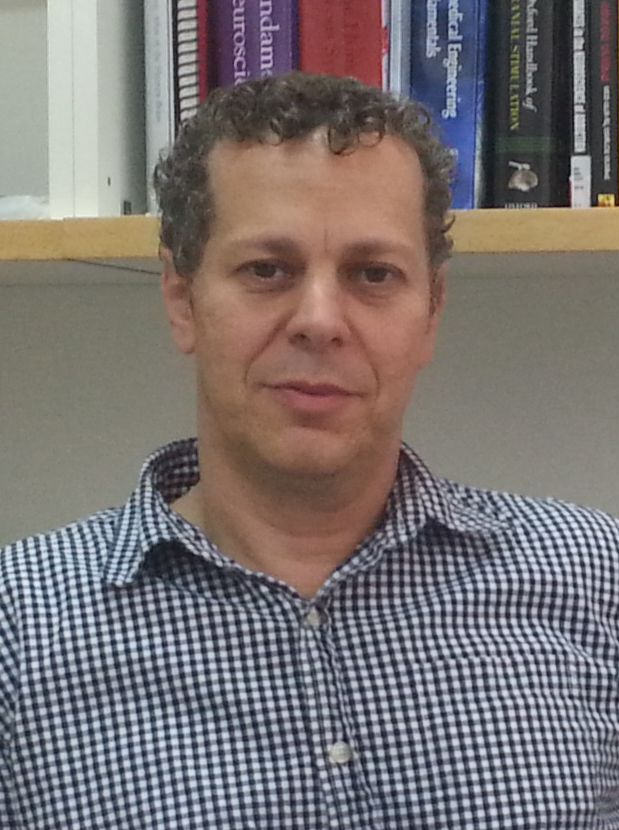
- Born: 1969 (age 56–57); Jerusalem, Israel
- Citizenship: Israeli
- Spouse: Rachel
- Children: 6
- Scientific career
- Workplaces: Weizmann Institute of Science; Ben Gurion University of the Negev

Abraham Zangen (Hebrew: אברהם צנגן; born 1969) is an Israeli professor of neuroscience, head of the brain stimulation and behavior lab and chair of the psychobiology brain program at Ben-Gurion University of the Negev (BGU).

His research examines neuroplasticity in the brain's reward system and how brain stimulation techniques can be used to understand and treat psychiatric disorders, including depression, addiction, and attention deficits.

During his postdoctoral fellowship at the U.S. National Institutes of Health (NIH), in the early 2000s Zangen and physicist Yiftach Roth co-invented the H-coil, a technology enabling deep transcranial magnetic stimulation (Deep TMS) that reaches deeper and larger volumes of brain regions than conventional TMS at that time. His group's subsequent research during the following two decades on Deep TMS has informed its clinical use in treating depression, obsessive-compulsive disorder, and smoking addiction, and in 2023 he led a study published in JCI Insight on personalized approaches to Deep TMS treatment selection. The technology was commercialized by the company BrainsWay, which Zangen co-founded in 2003 and continues to serve as a scientific consultant.

== Biography ==
Abraham Zangen was born in Ramat Gan, Israel. He earned his B.Sc. in pharmacology from the Hebrew University and his PhD from the Bar Ilan University (in collaboration with the Weizmann Institute) in Israel in 1999. He then completed a postdoc at the U.S. National Institutes of Health (NIH) until 2003. In 2003, he returned to Israel and established a laboratory at the Weizmann Institute of Science in Rehovot, attaining the rank of associate professor in 2010. In 2012, he joined the faculty of Ben Gurion University of the Negev and was made a full professor in 2015.

== Personal life ==
Zangen is married to Rachel, with whom he has six children.

== Research ==
Zangen studies neuroplasticity in the brain reward system, the neurobiological basis of depression and addiction, and the effects of brain stimulation on neuroplasticity in psychiatric disorders including depression, addiction and attention deficits. His research has been supported by grants from the U.S. National Institutes of Health (NIH) and the Israel Science Foundation (ISF), among other funding bodies.

=== Co-invention of the H-coil and Deep TMS ===
During his post doctoral fellowship at the NIH, in parallel to his basic neurobiological studies in animal models, Zangen and physicist Yiftach Roth co-invented the H-coil for transcranial magnetic stimulation in humans, working alongside NIH colleagues Mark Hallett, Roy A. Wise, and Pedro C. Miranda. The coil allows deeper penetration of the magnetic field into the brain directly stimulating larger volumes in the brain, and the procedure became known as Deep TMS.

Zangen and his team conducted multicenter studies leading to the BrainsWay Deep TMS system receiving FDA clearance in 2013 for treatment-resistant major depressive disorder with the H1 coil. Zangen has co-developed additional versions of Deep TMS coils, and in 2018, the FDA granted de novo clearance for the treatment of obsessive-compulsive disorder with the H7 coil, and in 2020, the FDA granted 510(k) clearance for smoking cessation following a multicenter study with the H4 coil. As of 2021, over 100,000 patients worldwide have been treated with Deep TMS.

In 2023, a comparative study led by Zangen and published in JCI Insight validated the efficacy of two different Deep TMS coils (targeting the lateral vs. medial prefrontal cortex) for treatment-resistant depression. The study also identified clinical and electrophysiological features that can guide clinicians in selecting the most effective coil for a given patient.

The first H-coil was patented by the NIH in 2002. Zangen, Roth, and entrepreneurs Zacut and Hagai co-founded BrainsWay in 2003 to commercialize the technology under an exclusive license from the NIH; Zangen continues to serve as a scientific consultant to BrainsWay.

=== Addiction research ===
At the National Institute on Drug Abuse in Baltimore, Zangen worked on reward processing on animal models and later at the Weizmann Institute discovered that electrical stimulation of specific brain regions in rats can induce neurochemical changes opposite to those caused by repeated cocaine exposure. This study bridged animal models to human applications and laid the groundwork for subsequent clinical trials of Deep TMS in addiction.

The MIT Technology Review reported that Zangen and his team were evaluating the potential for disrupting areas of the brain that are overactive in cases of addiction or Obsessive compulsive disorder (OCD).

In 2018, the FDA granted de novo clearance to deep transcranial magnetic stimulation as a non-invasive treatment for OCD, after being cleared for treatment-resistant major depressive disorder in 2013 following multicenter studies conducted by Zangen and his team.

In 2020, the FDA granted clearance for a different version of this technology for smoking cessation in the wake of another multicenter study.

As of April 2021, over 100,000 patients around the world have been treated with Deep TMS.

In 2023, a comparative study led by Zangen validated the efficacy of two different Deep TMS coils for treatment-resistant depression. The study also indicated clinical and electrophysiological features that can be used to select the best coil for a given patient. According to Zangen, this study was an "important scientific step forward towards personalized psychiatry." Zangen has been working with BrainsWay on a multichannel stimulation device that can target multiple regions of the brain in different ways, exciting some regions and suppressing others.

=== Smartphone use and addiction ===
Zangen has also studied the cognitive and electrophysiological effects of excessive smartphone use. In a 2017 study published by his research group found that heavy smartphone users showed impaired attention, reduced numerical processing capacity, changes in social cognition, and distinct electrophysiological patterns compared to light users. Moreover, Zangen provided smartphones to non-users (still available at that time), and followed the induced cognitive and electrophysiological alterations. The findings contributed to the emerging literature on the potential neurological correlates of technology-related behavioral addictions.

Zangen has published over 150 peer-reviewed articles, reviews and book chapters.

== Awards and recognition ==
- 1998: Israel Society for Biological Psychiatry Award for Young Researcher
- 1998: Aharon Katzir Prize of Excellence for Ph.D. studies
- 1999: Israeli Society for Biological Psychiatry Annual Prize
- 2005: INRC Award for Young Scientists
- 2007: Medical Futures Innovation Award, Mental Health and Neuroscience, UK
- 2010: Sieratzki Prize for Advances in Neuroscience
- 2012: Complex Medical Engineering Award (Kobe, Japan)
- 2015: Juludan Research Prize
- 2019: Annual Innovation Award, Ben-Gurion University

== Selected papers ==
- Zangen, A; Ikemoto, Satoshi; Zadina, James E.; Wise, Roy A. (2002-08-15). "Rewarding and Psychomotor Stimulant Effects of Endomorphin-1: Anteroposterior Differences within the Ventral Tegmental Area and Lack of Effect in Nucleus Accumbens". Journal of Neuroscience. 22 (16): 7225–7233. doi:10.1523/jneurosci.22-16-07225.2002. PMC 6757872. PMID 12177217.
- Zangen, A; Solinas, Marcello; Ikemoto, Satoshi; Goldberg, Steven R.; Wise, Roy A. (2006-05-03). "Two Brain Sites for Cannabinoid Reward". Journal of Neuroscience. 26 (18): 4901–4907. doi:10.1523/JNEUROSCI.3554-05.2006. PMC 6674153. PMID 16672664.
- Zangen, A; Roth, Yiftach; Voller, Bernhard; Hallett, Mark (2005). "Transcranial magnetic stimulation of deep brain regions: evidence for efficacy of the H-Coil". Clinical Neurophysiology. 116 (4): 775–779. doi:10.1016/j.clinph.2004.11.008. PMID 15792886. S2CID 25101101.
- Dinur-Klein, Limor; Dannon, Pinhas; Hadar, Aviad; Rosenberg, Oded; Roth, Yiftach; Kotler, Moshe; Zangen, Abraham (2014). "Smoking Cessation Induced by Deep Repetitive Transcranial Magnetic Stimulation of the Prefrontal and Insular Cortices: A Prospective, Randomized Controlled Trial". Biological Psychiatry. 76 (9): 742–749. doi:10.1016/j.biopsych.2014.05.020. PMID 25038985. S2CID 6232377.
- Carmi, Lior; Alyagon, Uri; Barnea-Ygael, Noam; Zohar, Joseph; Dar, Reuven; Zangen, Abraham (2018). "Clinical and electrophysiological outcomes of deep TMS over the medial prefrontal and anterior cingulate cortices in OCD patients". Brain Stimulation. 11 (1): 158–165. doi:10.1016/j.brs.2017.09.004. PMID 28927961.
- Levkovitz, Y; Isserles, Moshe; Padberg, Frank; Lisanby, Sarah H.; Bystritsky, Alexander; Xia, Guohua; Tendler, Aron; Daskalakis, Zafiris J.; Winston, Jaron L. (2015-02-01). "Efficacy and safety of deep transcranial magnetic stimulation for major depression: a prospective multicenter randomized controlled trial". World Psychiatry. 14 (1): 64–73. doi:10.1002/wps.20199. PMC 4329899. PMID 25655160.
- Naim-Feil, Jodie; Zangen, Abraham (2013). "Chapter 49: Addiction". In Lozano, Andres M.; Hallett, Mark (eds.). Brain Stimulation. Elsevier Inc. ISBN 9780128080559.
- Zangen, A.; Zibman, S.; Tendler, A.; Barnea-Ygael, N.; Alyagon, U.; Blumberger, D. M.; Grammer, G.; Shalev, H.; Gulevski, T.; Vapnik, T.; Bystritsky, A.; Filipčić, I.; Feifel, D.; Stein, A.; Deutsch, F.; Roth, Y.; George, M. S. (2023). "Pursuing personalized medicine for depression by targeting the lateral or medial prefrontal cortex with Deep TMS". JCI Insight. 8 (4) e165271. doi:10.1172/jci.insight.165271. PMC 9977507. PMID 36692954.

== See also ==
- Science and technology in Israel
- Health care in Israel
- List of Israeli inventions and discoveries
