= Sara and Myra =

Former drilling licenses in Israel

- Location of Sara and Myra gas field offshore Israel
- Country: Israel
- Region: Levantine basin
- Location: Eastern Mediterranean Sea
- Blocks: 347 (Myra), 348 (Sara)
- Offshore/onshore: Offshore
- Coordinates: 32°30′0″N 34°15′0″E
- Operator: GeoGlobal Resources Inc.
- Partners: Emanuelle Energy; ILDC Energy; The Israel Land Development Co. Modi'in Energy LP; IDB Holdings; GeoGlobal Resources Inc
- Service contractors: Noble Corporation

Production
- Estimated oil in place: 150 million barrels (~2.0×10^{7} t)
- Estimated gas in place: 6,500×10^{9} cu ft (180×10^{9} m^{3})

Sara (or Sarah) and Myra (or Mira) (Hebrew: שרה ומירה) were two Israeli offshore drilling licenses located west of Netanya, Israel. The licenses expired on July 13, 2015. Exploratory drilling in the license area in 2012 was unsuccessful, but seismic studies indicated the possibility of oil and gas at deeper strata that were not explored.

== Background ==
Sara (Israeli oil exploration license number 348) and Myra (347) were offshore drilling licenses located 40 kilometers off the coast of Netanya, Israel. They were situated south and southwest of the confirmed Dalit gas field and southeast of the Leviathan gas field. A preliminary two-dimensional geological survey carried out by Chapman Petroleum Ltd. in 2010 estimated there to be upwards of 6 to 7 trillion cubic feet (170×10^{9} to 200×10^{9} m^{3}) of natural gas, equivalent to US$8–10 billion. Subsequent analysis of a three-dimensional seismic survey conducted in 2011 by Texas-based oil and gas consulting firm Netherland, Sewell & Associates Inc. confirmed a 54% probability of 6.5 trillion cubic feet (180 billion cubic metres) of natural gas for the licenses, as well as an 18% probability of 150.7 million barrels (23.96×10^{6} m^{3}) of oil.

== Exploration ==
License partner GeoGlobal Resources announced in July 2011 that it finalized an agreement with Noble Corporation for use of the latter's Homer Ferrington drilling rig. Subsequently, Ofer Nimrodi of ILDC Energy, announced that drilling operations at Sara and Myra would commence in the first quarter of 2012. A preliminary meeting between the CEO of ILDC Energy and representatives of the Israel Electric Corporation suggested that Sara and Myra would begin supplying gas in 2015–2016.

In June 2012, a first exploratory well was drilled in the Myra area to a depth of 4,659 meters at which point a technical failure prevented further drilling and the well was plugged. The prospective Jurassic oil zone is at 5000 meters. Drilling was redirected to explore the neighboring Tamar sands formation without success. The Sara area was drilled in September 2012 to explore Tamar sands at a depth of 3946 meters. This drilling was also unsuccessful. Deeper prospective gas zones in the Sara area are estimated to be at 5,100 and 5,300 meters, and a deeper prospective oil zone is at 5,400 meters.

NSAI seismic analysis presented in the Modiin 2013 Annual Report indicated that the Sara license area had an estimated 20 BCM of gas in two deeper strata, with a 20-30% likelihood, and the Myra license had an estimated 64 million barrels of oil at a deeper strata, with a 16% likelihood.

== History of ownership ==
Rights to the licenses were initially granted to PetroMed Corporation. In 2011, eight companies shared ownership of the licenses.

Company	Stake	Leading stakeholder
Emanuelle Energy Oil & Gas Exploration LP (Partially owned subsidiary of ILDC)	19.161%	Ofer Nimrodi
Emanuelle Energy Ltd. (Fully owned subsidiary of ILDC)	24.161%	Ofer Nimrodi
Blue Water Oil & Gas Exploration Ltd.	8.787%	
The Israel Land Development Co. Ltd. (TASE:ILDC)	5%	Nimrodi family members
Modiin Energy LP (TASE:MDIN.L)	19.282%	Nochi Dankner (via IDB Group, 16.94%); Yitzhak Sultan (2.04%)
IDB Group (TASE:IDBH)	5%	Nochi Dankner
Israel Petroleum Company (IPC)	13.609%	PetroMed Corp.
GeoGlobal Resources Inc. (AMEX:GRR)	5%	ILDC holds rights to acquire near 50%

At the time of expiration, the licenses were held by the following companies: Energean Oil & Gas (25%), Ratio Oil Exploration Partnership (25%), Modiin Energy Partnership (13.8%), Emanuelle Energy Ltd. (9.2%), Emanuelle Energy Oil and Gas Partnership (7.9%), IPC Partnership (6.4%), GeoGlobal Resources India Inc. (5%), ILDC Ltd (5%), and IDB Ltd. (2.7%).

== See also ==
- Exclusive Economic Zone
- Leviathan gas field
- Natural gas in Israel
- Tamar gas field
