= Prinos =

Prinos (Greek: Πρίνος) may refer to the following villages in Greece:

- Prinos, Thasos, on the island of Thasos
  - Prinos oil field off the coast of Thasos
- Prinos, Trikala
- Prinos, Rethymno
