= Prinos oil field =

Oil field in the Aegean Sea

Coordinates: 40.80°N 24.49°E

Prinos
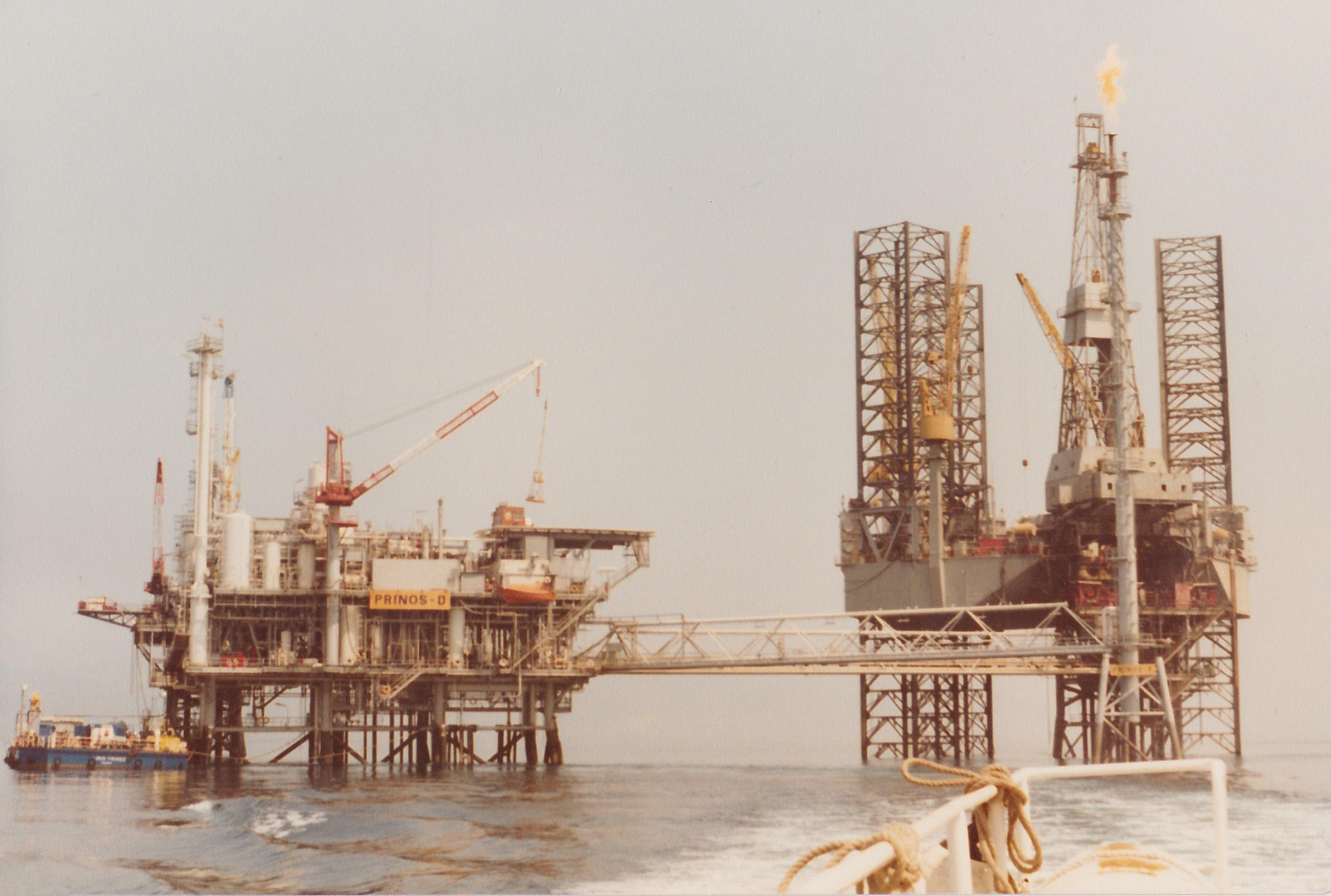
- The Prinos D production platform with the Penrod 58 jackup rig on location for workover in 1982
- Country: Greece
- Region: Aegean Sea
- Offshore/onshore: offshore
- Operator: Energean Oil & Gas

Field history
- Discovery: 1971
- Start of development: 1971
- Start of production: 1975

Production
- Current production of oil: 1,900 barrels per day (~95,000 t/a)
- Estimated oil in place: 12 million tonnes (~ 10×10^{6} m^{3} or 90 million bbl)

The Prinos oil field (Greek: Κοίτασμα του Πρίνου) is an oil field located in the northern Aegean Sea, between the island of Thasos and city of Kavala on the mainland. It was discovered in 1971 by the Oceanic Exploration company of Denver. The field was developed by Energean Oil & Gas. It began production in 1974. It was named after the village of Prinos on Thasos, the nearest inhabited place.

The total proven reserves of the Prinos oil field were estimated at 90 million barrels (12 million tonnes), and production is centered on 1,900 barrels per day (300 m^{3}/d). However, by 2020 it has delivered some 120 million barrels of crude, exceeding the original estimate.

The output of the field was loss-making for the company and in 2020, the Energean Oil & Gas asked for the government support.

== Geological setting ==
The Prinos Basin is situated at the southern edge of the Rhodope Mountains, a pre-Alpine geological structure. This area remained above sea level during much of geological history and only began subsiding during the Middle Miocene period (approximately 15 million years ago). The basin formed through a process known as extensional tectonics, where the Earth's crust stretched and thinned, creating downward-dropping blocks along large sloping faults known as listric faults.

The basin covers a total area of about 800 square kilometres, with most of it lying offshore between Thasos island and the mainland. Only the northeastern portion extends onshore into the Nestos River delta plain. Water depths in the offshore portion are relatively shallow, not exceeding 50 metres.

Unlike other areas in the North Aegean that were affected by strike-slip faulting (where blocks of crust move horizontally past each other), the Prinos Basin was primarily shaped by vertical pull-apart gravity tectonics. This mechanism allowed for rapid subsidence and the accumulation of a thick sequence of sediments that eventually reached 5,000 metres in depth—creating ideal conditions for hydrocarbon formation and preservation.

== Basin structure and tectonics ==
The Prinos Basin is characterised by extensive marginal faults trending in northeast-southwest and northwest-southeast directions. These large-scale gravity faults of various angles surround the basin from the Nestos delta in the north to the South Kavala ridge in the south. Many of these faults appear in an echelon pattern (a stepped, parallel arrangement) and several remain active.

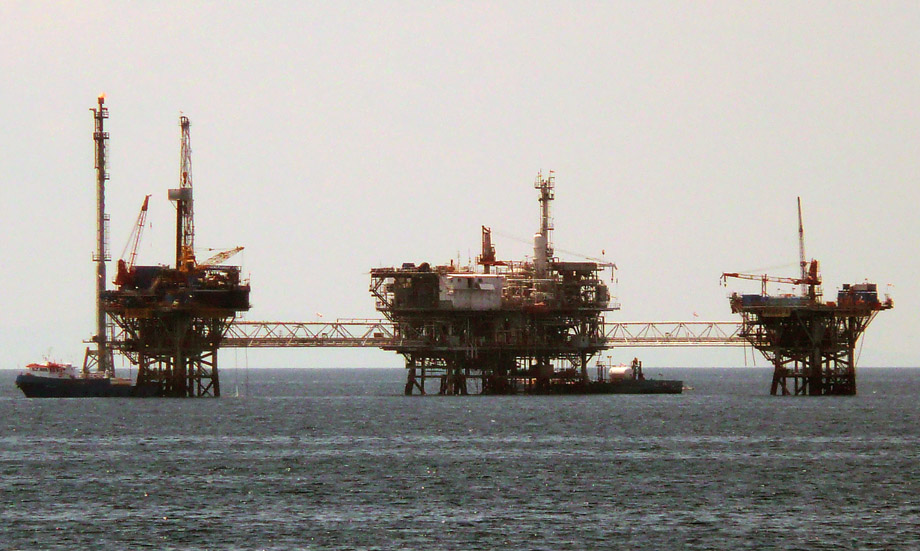
Prinos oil field

Within the basin, major internal faults primarily striking northwest-southeast create the mechanism for oil trapping. A distinctive feature of the basin is the formation of rollover anticlines—dome-like structures where rock layers have been bent upward—that formed simultaneously with sedimentation in front of these faults. These structures became the primary traps for hydrocarbon accumulation.

The basin is divided into two sub-basins separated by a topographic high (elevated area of basement rock) located in the Ammodhis area. The northern part forms the Nestos sub-basin, while the southern, deeper section forms the Prinos sub-basin where most hydrocarbon discoveries have been made. A complex system of parallel faults developed along the southern front of this central high, following the topographic relief and dipping southwards toward the basin centre. The movement along these faults was further complicated by salt deposition, which facilitated sliding. For example, a sliding fault beneath the Prinos field moved overlying formations southward, forming the broad North Prinos 1 anticline—a key oil-bearing structure.

== Exploration history ==
Exploration for hydrocarbons in the Prinos Basin began in the early 1970s. The first seismic campaign took place in the sea of Thrace in 1970, and the first oil discovery occurred in 1973. Since then, exploration has continued intermittently, guided by improving geological understanding of the basin. The basin's significance extends beyond its production figures, as it represents the only geological area in Greece where oil and gas have been commercially produced for more than forty years. It serves as a valuable exploration model for similar Neogene basins in the Northern Aegean Sea that share comparable geological and geochemical evolution.

The Prinos Basin demonstrates how even a relatively small basin of young geological age can generate substantial quantities of hydrocarbons given the right conditions: rapid subsidence creating space for thick sediment accumulation, good source rocks preserved under reducing conditions, suitable reservoir rocks, effective sealing mechanisms, and appropriate trap development timed with hydrocarbon generation and migration. Despite its mature status as a producing region, the exploration concept developed in Prinos—focusing on well-sealed traps containing sufficient permeable reservoir section at the base of the evaporitic zone—continues to guide hydrocarbon exploration efforts in analogous basins throughout the region.

== See also ==
- Energy in Greece
