= Epsilon oil field =

Oil field in the Aegean Sea

- Location within Greece
- Country: Greece
- Region: Aegean Sea
- Location: off Kavala
- Offshore/onshore: offshore
- Coordinates: 40.81°N 24.46°E
- Operator: Energean Oil & Gas

Field history
- Discovery: 2000
- Start of development: 2000
- Start of production: 2010

Production
- Current production of oil: 2,000 barrels per day (~100,000 t/a)
- Estimated oil in place: 4 million tonnes (~ 5×10^{6} m^{3} or 30 million bbl)

The Epsilon oil field is an oil field located in north Aegean Sea. It was discovered in 2000 and developed by Energean Oil & Gas. It began production in 2010 and produces oil. The total proven reserves of the Epsilon oil field are around 30 million barrels (4 million tonnes), and production is centered on 2,000 barrels per day (320 m^{3}/d).

== See also ==
- Energy in Greece
