= Israeli–Lebanese maritime border dispute =

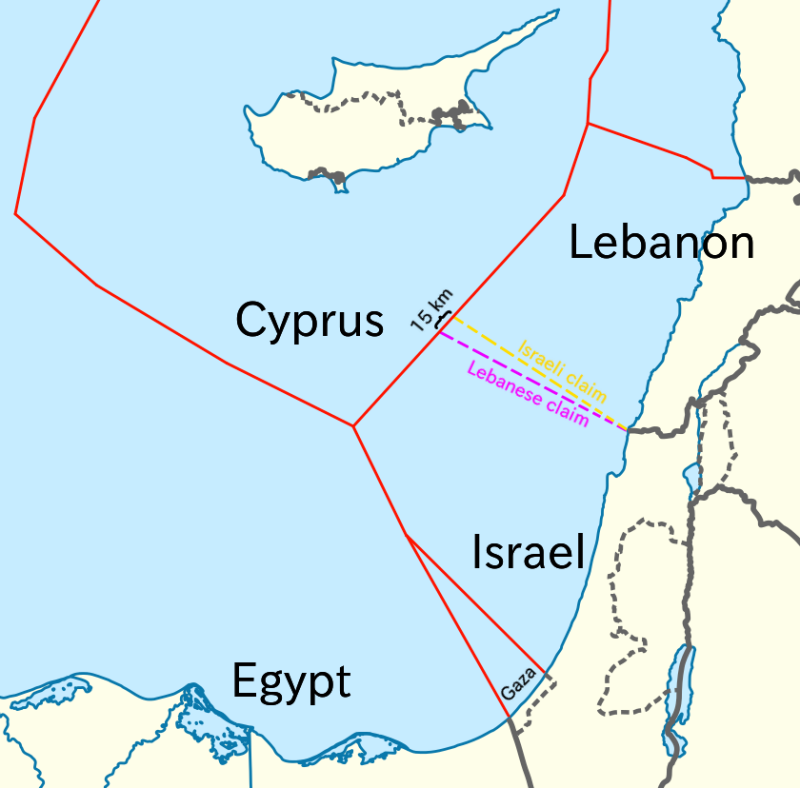
Exclusive economic zone between Israel and its neighbors

The Israeli–Lebanese maritime border dispute was a territorial dispute between the State of Israel and the Republic of Lebanon over the Qana and Karish gas fields. The dispute lasted from 2010 until 2022, and was resolved after nearly two years of negotiations.

Both countries laid claim to different maritime borders for decades, which became a matter of concern after the discovery of massive deposits of natural gas off the Israeli coast in 2010. Negotiations between the two countries were continuously delayed and postponed until 2022, when American diplomat Amos Hochstein took responsibility for mediating the negotiations. Military intervention was also speculated after numerous confrontations with Hezbollah and military standbys near the borders.

The negotiations led to an agreement signed by Israel and Lebanon on 27 October 2022 and guaranteed by the United States, which established a maritime boundary and ended the dispute between the two countries, opening the way for each to exploit the natural resources of the area.

== Background ==
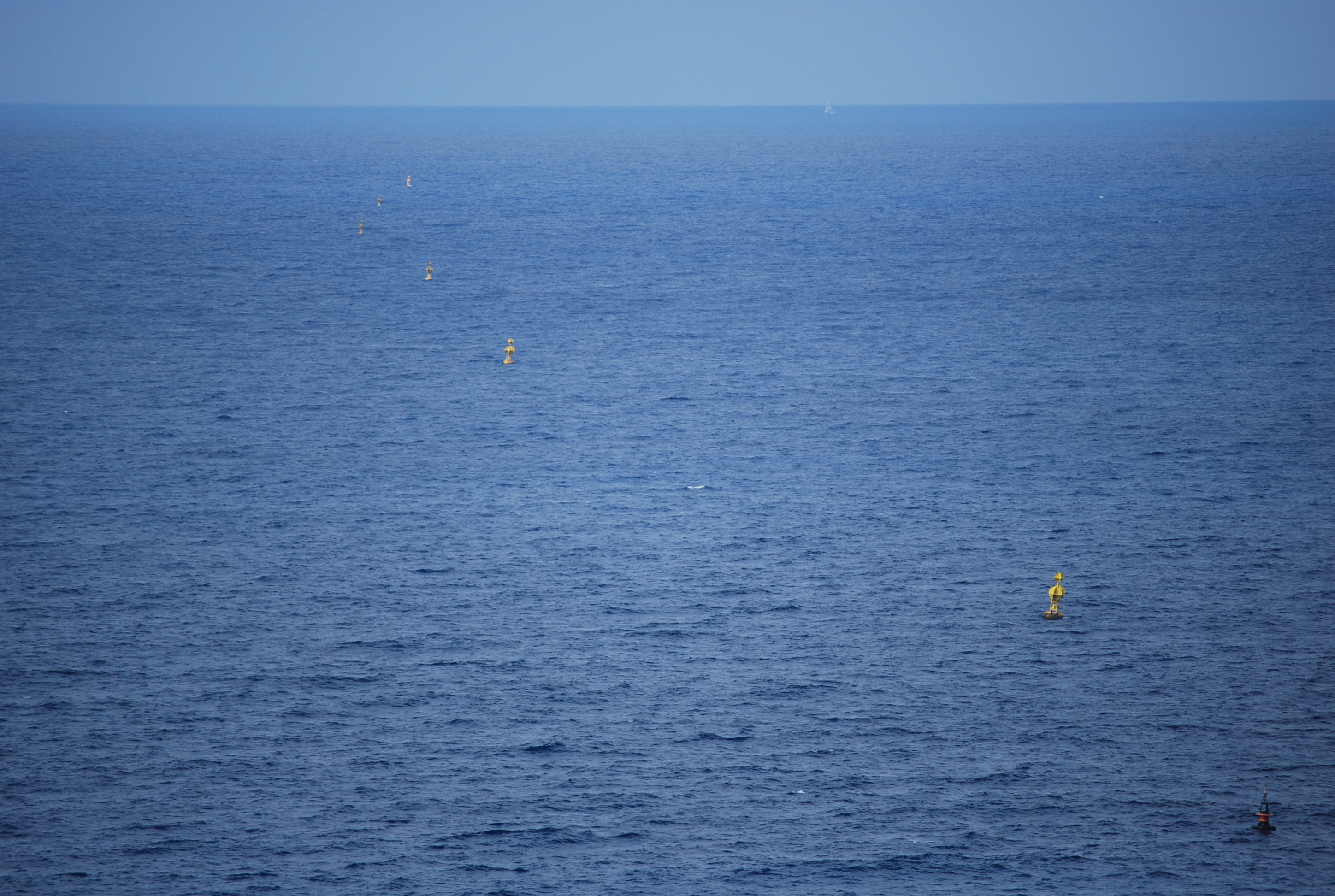
The buoy line between Israel and Lebanon that was agreed to maintain its status in practice until the land border between the countries is settled

Since 1948, both Israel and Lebanon have laid claim to a 330 sq mi area off the shores of both countries which contains natural gas resources, including the Qana and Karish gas reservoirs. However, this matter became a true dispute in 2010 after the discovery of massive deposits off the Israeli coast in which Lebanon expressed concerns that the deposits may stretch into Lebanese maritime territories. Lebanon submitted its border claims to the United Nations in 2011. The differences stem from Lebanon's position that the border line should be marked further along the land border, compared to Israel's position that it should be marked at 90 degrees to the coast. The Israeli government confirmed in August 2011 that it would submit its border proposal to the UN.

The portion of the Karish gas field which was located within undisputed Israeli territory began being developed for extraction in 2017, but work was delayed by the COVID-19 pandemic. When work resumed in 2020, Lebanon claimed the entire Karish field actually belonged to the country's exclusive economic zone. Israel rejected these claims, and subsequently entered negotiation proceedings with Lebanon. Negotiations ultimately stalled, with Minister of Energy of Israel Yuval Steinitz citing the Lebanese's inconsistency in demarcating the two nation's maritime border as the main factor, claiming that Lebanon had "changed its position... seven times." Lebanon then officially claimed an additional 540 sq mi area of Israeli territory, and negotiations apparently resumed sometime after.

== Military incidents ==
On 29 June 2022, Israeli forces downed a Hezbollah drone flying over the Mediterranean, in Lebanon's exclusive economic zone.

On 2 July 2022, Israel shot down three Hezbollah drones from Lebanon that were heading toward the Karish gas field. One was shot down by an F-16 while the other two were shot down by the Israeli Navy corvette INS Eilat.

== Negotiations ==
Negotiations for determining the maritime border between Israel and Lebanon began on 14 October 2020. The first round took place at the UN base at UNIFIL headquarters in the town of Naqoura in southern Lebanon. Assistant Secretary of State for Near Eastern Affairs David Schenker, who mediated between the parties, and United Nations Special Coordinator for Lebanon Ján Kubiš attended the first round of talks. Schenker also expressed hope that the move is only a first step on the way to further diplomatic moves. At this round, Israel was represented by Udi Adiri, Director General of the Ministry of Energy, while Lebanon was represented by Brigadier General Bassam Yassine, Deputy Chief of Staff for Operations, Lebanese Armed Forces.

=== Postponement ===
The negotiations had since been postponed as both countries reached a stalemate. The Minister of Energy of Israel Yuval Steinitz had tweeted that "Lebanon has changed its position on the demarcation of maritime borders with Israel seven times." Lebanese maritime border demarcation inconsistency is the main reason why these talks have been stalled. Lebanese President Michel Aoun had wished to continue these negotiations and to properly demarcate the Israeli-Lebanese maritime border.

On 12 April 2021, caretaker Minister of Public works and Transport Michel Najjar signed a document which expanded Lebanon's claim to 1400 square kilometres.

=== Amos Hochstein mediation and agreement ===
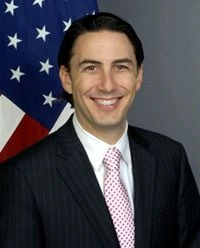
Amos Hochstein, the mediator in the agreement

In October 2021, Amos Hochstein was appointed as the new United States mediator and negotiations resumed in January 2022. In June, Hochstein presented Lebanon's proposal to the Israeli government but tensions sparked after a drilling platform arrived at one of the fields, during which Hezbollah launched drones towards the rig which were intercepted by the IDF. In September, Hochstein presented a compromise proposal after which all parties reached several agreements. During the United Nations assembly in 22 September, Najib Mikati stressed his optimism on a mutual agreement. Hochstein and Brett McGurk, adviser to US President Joe Biden on Middle East affairs, met with the parties separately after the assembly and discussed the draft agreement. Another deal was proposed on 1 October, initially fabricated by the United States. Lebanon responded days after and refused to recognize this deal since it involved paying royalties for the gas within its territories.

On 11 October 2022, newspapers stated that the two countries reached an agreement and on 13 October 2022 that the Israeli government voted to advance the agreement to the final stage of the approval process. It was agreed that the Karish gas field would be under full Israeli control and the Qana gas field was assigned to Lebanon where the French energy and petroleum company, TotalEnergies, will run exploration and exploitations while paying some royalties to Israel. Israel will keep the three-mile zone off its coast that it says it needs for coastal security.

These negotiations led to an agreement resolving the dispute, signed on October 27, 2022. This was regarded as a historic agreement between two rival nations. The Lebanese government urged the French company to immediately launch gas exploration in the Qana gas field.

==== Reactions ====
- The Minister of Foreign Affairs and International Cooperation of the United Arab Emirates expressed praise in the efforts to reach the agreement and that this step would contribute to strengthening regional stability.
- (United Kingdom) UK ambassador Hamish Cowell said via Twitter: “I am delighted to see an agreement reached on the maritime border between Lebanon and Israel."
- Israeli Prime Minister Yair Lapid said in a statement: “This is an historic achievement that will strengthen Israel’s security, inject billions into Israel’s economy, and ensure the stability of our northern border.”
- Hassan Nasrallah said that "what happened is a big big big victory for the state of Lebanon, its citizens and the resistance", Nasrallah emphasized that the agreement was reached without Israel's normalization. And this can be seen in the fact that the delegations didn't sit under one roof at any stage. Also, according to Nasrallah, the leaders behaved precisely and there is no document on which the signatures of both parties appear to avoid the appearance of normalization. And emphasized that the agreement doesn't have the status of an international contract and does not grant Israel security guarantees. In addition, Nasrallah announced the end of the special state of alert declared by Hezbollah regarding the registration of the border. The latter was made during the speech at the opening ceremony of the "My Land" market in Beirut.

== Analysis ==
The deal could eventually become a key source of income for Lebanon, which has been hit by an economic crisis and could stabilize its electricity grid. If it improves Lebanon's economy, it could strengthen the country's institutions and reduce Hezbollah's influence. However, initial exploratory drilling completed in October 2023 failed to find commercial quantities of gas in the Qana prospect.

Israel has said it could begin extracting oil and gas from the Karish field and export it to Europe within weeks of signing the deal and amid the ongoing Russian invasion of Ukraine. It touted the agreement as strengthening regional stability and hoped the deal would bring security to its northern maritime boundary since it would quell threats by Hezbollah, which has said it would abide by a maritime border deal. Randa Slim of the Middle East Institute said the deal could eventually lead to negotiations on where to draw the Israel–Lebanon land border.

== See also ==
- Israeli–Lebanese conflict
