= Dimitris Ververelis =

Greek helicopter pilot

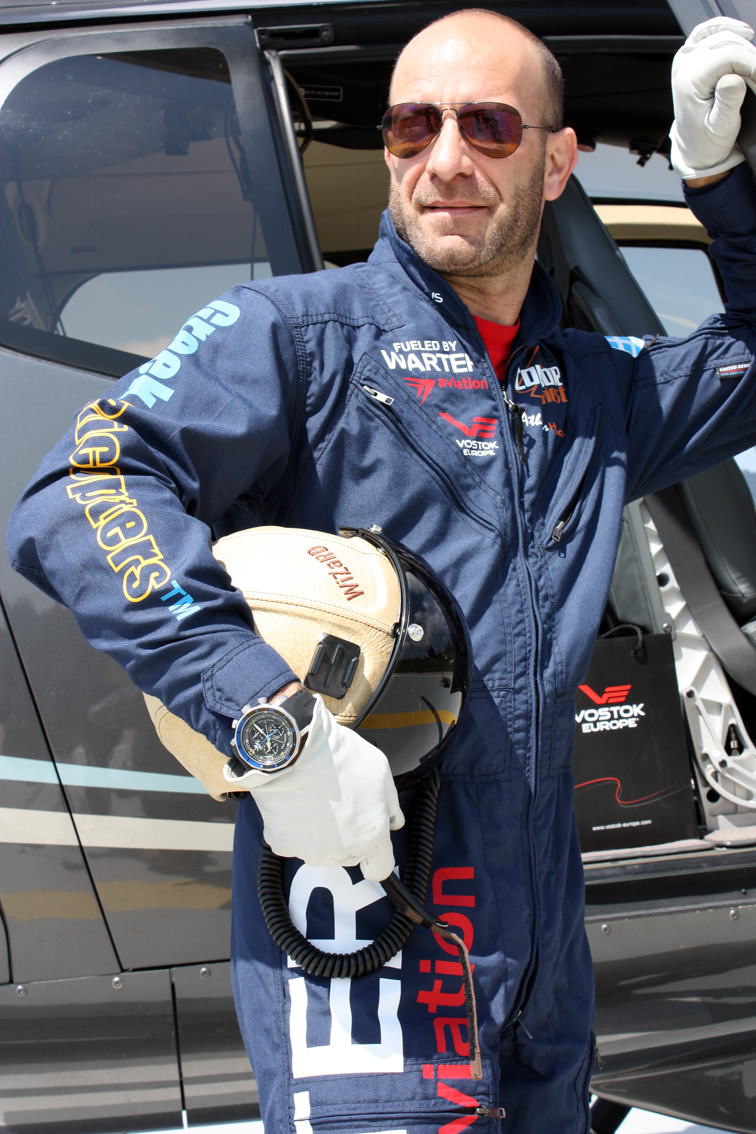
- Other names: D.T. Ververelis, "The Wizard"
- Occupations: Helicopter Pilot, Flight Instructor
- Years active: 25
- Website: ververelis.aero

Dimitris Ververelis, also known as D.T. Ververelis, is a Greek helicopter pilot nicknamed "The Wizard." He is the first Greek helicopter pilot to perform a televised full loop with a helicopter.

== Career ==
Ververelis became a helicopter pilot in 1998. He served in the Hellenic Army Special Forces. Ververelis received his commercial helicopter license in the United States and continued to train in countries including France, the United Kingdom, Ukraine and South Africa. He then became a certified flight instructor and in 1999 he founded GreekHelicopters.gr. Since 2004 he has been a flight instructor at Dekeleia Aeroclub in Tatoi.

He has participated in the Athens Flying Week, the largest air event in Greece, since it started in 2012. Athens Flying Week involves pilots performing precision exercises, operational maneuvers and mock rescues. Since 2014, Ververelis has flown an EC-120 B with the colors of Vostok Europe. His flight displays often incorporate backward movements with quick changes of heading, back flips, back and front pirouettes, 90° climbs, 360° vertical dives, dog turns and full down autorotations.

In June 2016 he participated for the first time at the Kavala Air Sea Show in Kavala. He is the father of term 'helobatic' used for unusual and extreme helicopter maneuvers. The name of the team changed to 'Wizard Helobatics'.

At the Athens Flying Week In September 2016, Ververelis' show was narrated by the famous Greek comedic impressionist George Mitsikostas. Ververelis performed together with the JetMan Yves Rossy, Vince Reffet, Fred Fugen and the Pegasus Apatsi Team in joint flight displays.

In June 2018 at the Kavala Air Sea Show, Ververelis joined in arrow formation with Pattuglia Blu Circe at Nea Peramos. At the same event he dropped skydiver Anastasis Sideris of Skydive Athens for a swooping landing in front of the spectators.

When asked to describe the joy of flight he said: "Flying is like Argentine Tango. You have to understand your heli-partner and always think steps in advance. You have to guide her with respect and she will impress you! If she happens to stumble you will need your skills and knowledge to hold her."

Ververelis is trained in more than 17 helicopter types. He holds both FAA and EASA flight licenses. He is a helicopter flight instructor, examiner. and AOPA Hellas Honorary Member.

Ververelis, is co-founder and COO of AviTracer, a high-tech aviation related company based in Athens, Greece, specializing in aviation electronic solutions. Their flagship product is the AviTracer and platform for global aircraft fleet tracking. AviTracer also offers other aviation services like the BRIEF platform dedicated to filing flight plans and generating briefing packs that contain weather information, NOTAM, ICAO FPL, and GenDec, essential details for a safe and informed flight for pilots of AOC operators and flight academies.
