= Kavala AirSea Show =

Thessaloniki AirSea Show
- Genre: Air show
- Dates: June
- Frequency: Annual
- Location: Thessaloniki
- Coordinates: 40.6212524°N 22.9110079°E
- Country: Greece
- Established: 2011
- Website: www.kavala-airshow.com

Thessaloniki AirSea Show (previously known as Kavala AirSea Show) is a free annual airshow scheduled to be held in 2022 above the harbour of Thessaloniki, Greece. Up to 2019 the show was held above the harbour of Kavala, Greece. The show takes place over the course of three days, usually during the last 10 days of June (Friday to Sunday), and features various types of aircraft, helicopters and parachutists from all over Europe and the Middle-East, including the Saudi Falcons from Saudi Arabia, the F-16 Demo Team of the Hellenic Air Force and the helobatic display of Cpt Dimitris "Wizard" Ververelis. In addition to aircraft, the coastline hosts a range of food counters, stalls and aero-modelling exhibitions.

The Air Show was first held in 2011 (without the presence of the maritime clubs) as a single day show, but due to its success it became a three-day show in 2012. In 2013 it became an "AirSea Show" with the participation of the maritime clubs. The 2015 AirSea Show was cancelled due to late preparations and financial instabilities, but it returned on 24-26 June 2016.

The 2016 AirSea Show was dedicated to the island of Thasos and the 100 years from the construction of a military airport near Prinos village. The aerial history of Thasos has recently become an interesting topic for the historical researchers, particularly after the discovery of the wreckage of a Sopwith Camel of the Royal Canadian Air Force, which was crashed on the mountains of Thasos in 1917.

== Gallery ==
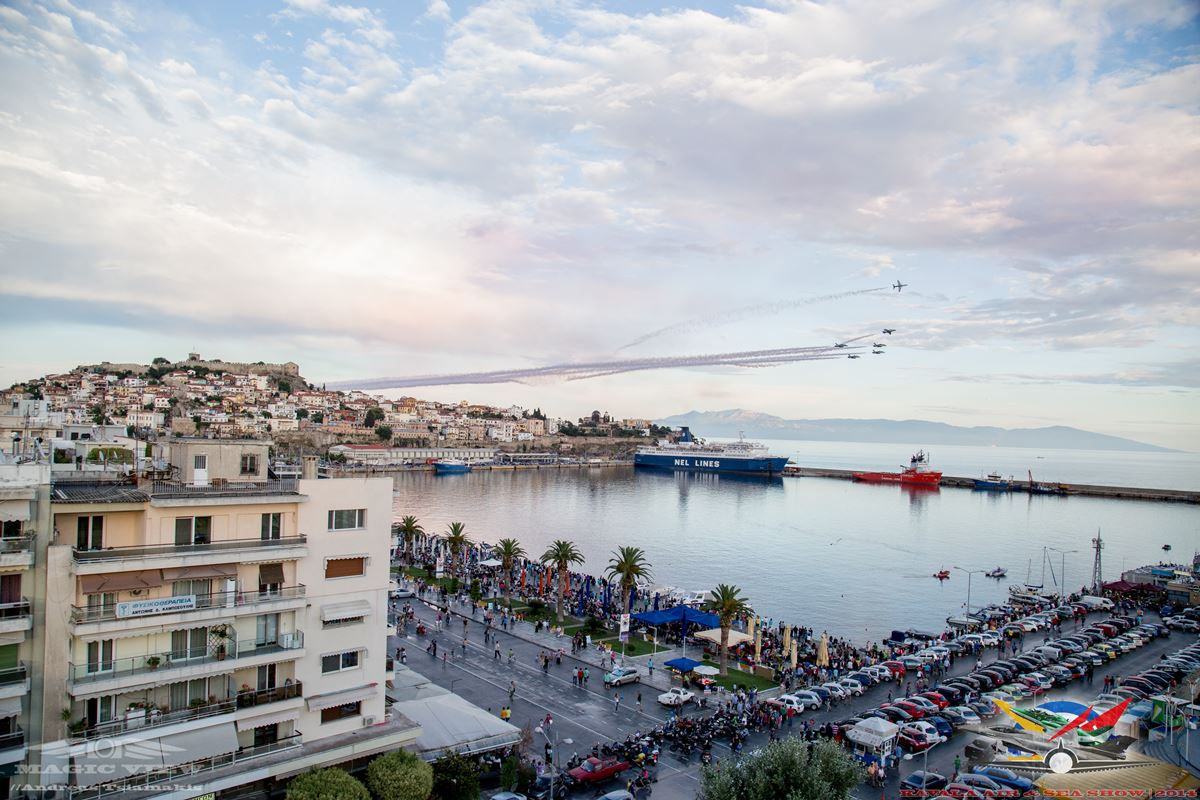
View of Kavala (from press spot) during the Saudi Hawks demonstration (2014 AirSea Show)

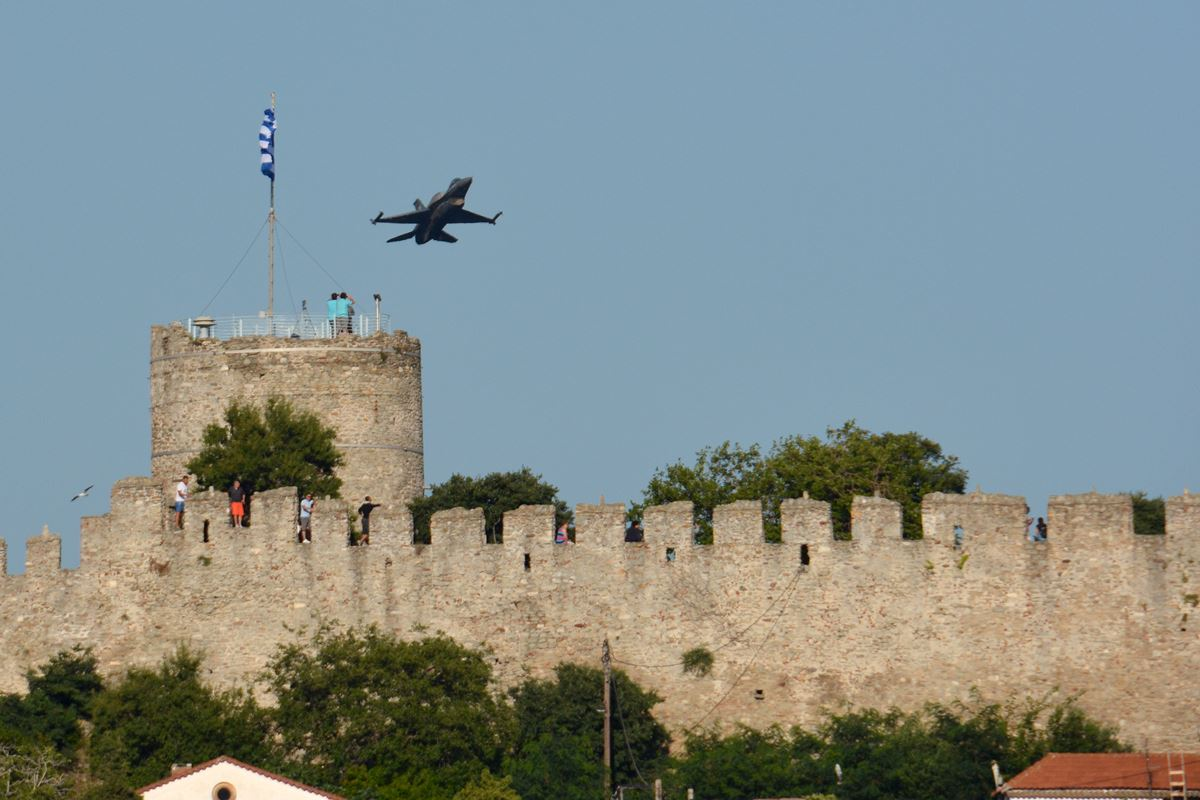
F-16 Block 52+ (from the Greek F-16 Demo Team "Zeus") flying over the Byzantine fortress of Kavala (2014 AirSea Show)

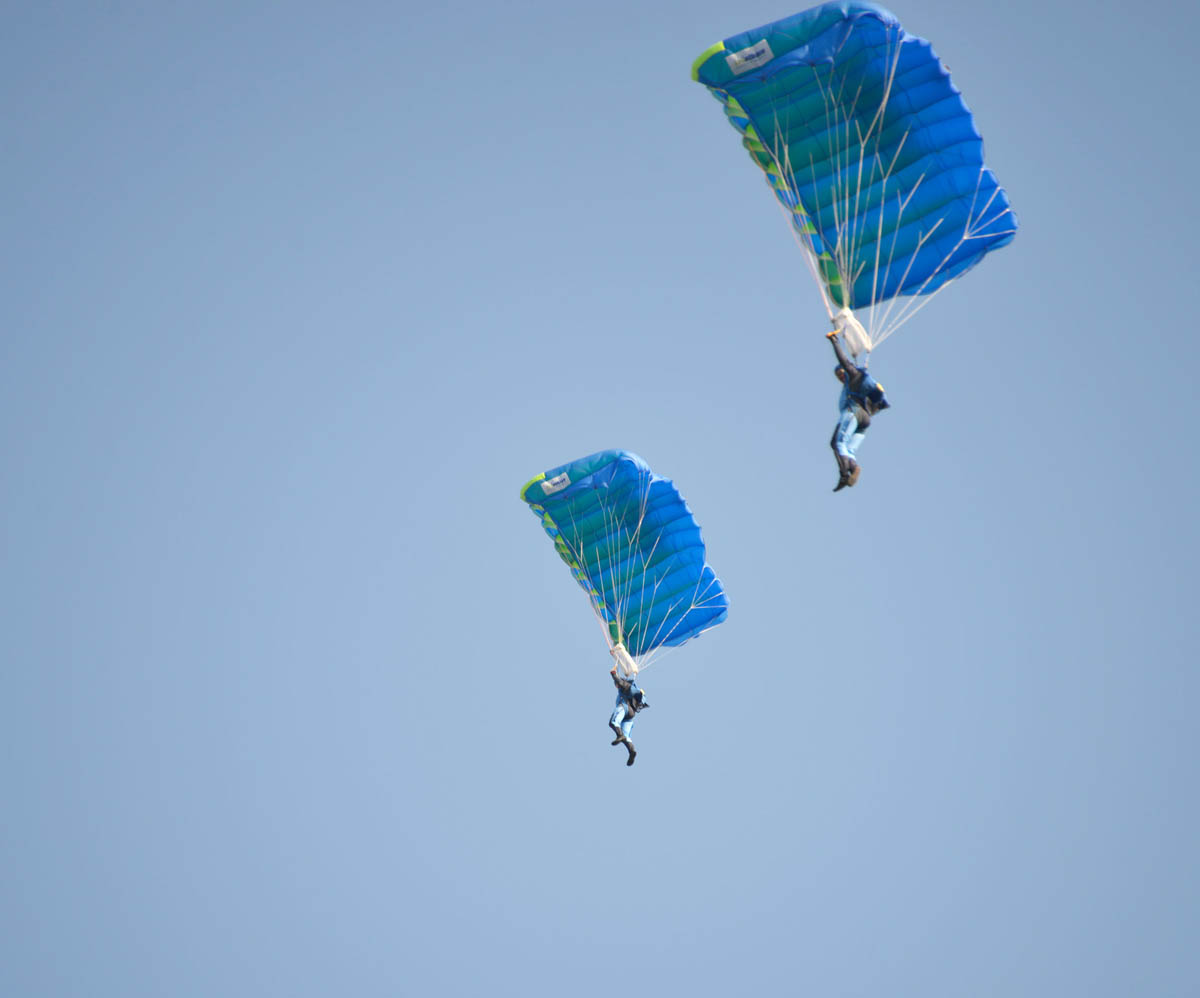
Members of the "BLUE WINGS" parachuting group from Romania descending to the harbour of Kavala (2013 AirSea Show)

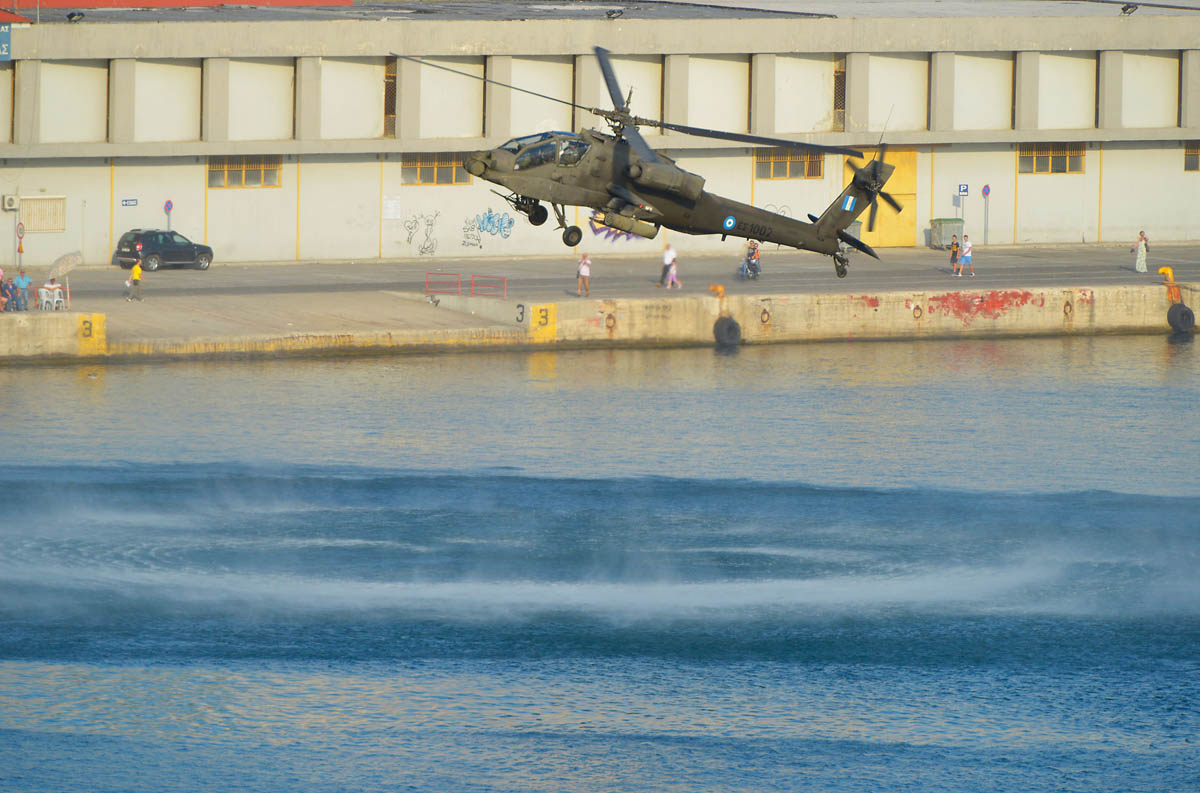
An AH-64 Apache of the Hellenic Army Aviation flying a few meters above the sea level in the harbour of Kavala (2013 AirSea Show)

== See also ==
- List of airshows
