= Tanin gas field =

Natural gas reservoir in Israel

Tanin
- Tanin gas field
- Country: Israel
- Region: Eastern Mediterranean
- Block: Alon A license (364)
- Offshore/onshore: Offshore
- Coordinates: 33°10′N 33°45′E
- Operators: Energean Oil & Gas
- Service contractors: TechnipFMC (constr.); Wood Group (ops.)

Field history
- Discovery: 2012-02-07

Production
- Producing formations: Tamar sands

The Tanin gas field (Hebrew: מאגר תנין, "Crocodile reservoir" or “Taninn reservoir”) is a natural gas reservoir located 120 km off the coast of Israel. It is the country's seventh natural gas discovery, located nearby the much larger Leviathan gas field.

On 5 February 2012 Noble Energy reported that the Ensco 5006 drilling rig (formerly the Pride North America) had struck gas at a depth of 5,500 m. Preliminary estimates put the potential for natural gas at Tanin at 1.2-1.3 trillion cubic feet. A subsequent report evaluated the field as containing 1.1 trillion cubic feet of natural gas: 0.6 TCF proven (contingent) reserves and 0.5 TCF prospective. Tanin is located within the Alon A license, in which three companies are partners: Noble Energy (47%), Delek Drilling (26.5%), and Avner Oil Exploration (26.5%). It is Israel's third-largest natural gas reservoir.

Due to Noble Energy and Delek (and its subsidiary Avner's) monopolistic position in the domestic natural gas production market, they were forced by the Israeli government to divest most of their rights in the Tanin and nearby Karish fields in 2016. The rights were acquired by the Greek exploration company Energean Oil & Gas. As of 2018, Energean has signed supply contracts with customers in Israel which account for all of the proven reserves in the two fields (at a production rate of 4.2 BCM per year). In March 2019 Energean intends to begin drilling exploration wells in order to assess the viability of the fields’ additional prospective and contingent reserves. In November 2019, Tsabar Gas and Oil, which is controlled by Beny Steinmetz, filed a lawsuit against Energean with the claim that Energean did not abide by its agreements with Tsabar involving Tanin and that Energean had denied Tsabar its fair share.

Gas production from Tanin is expected after the Karish field goes online in 2022 and will be carried out using an FPSO vessel connected by a submarine pipeline to the Israeli domestic natural gas distribution grid.

== See also ==
- Hydrocarbon exploration
- Natural gas in Israel
- Offshore drilling
- Economy of Israel
