= Modiin Energy =

Israeli oil and gas exploration company

Modiin Energy Limited Partnership
- Company type: Public
- Traded as: TASE:MODIIN L
- Industry: Oil and gas exploration
- Headquarters: Tel Aviv, Israel
- Key people: Yitzhak Sultan
- Revenue: NIS 0 (2010)
- Operating income: NIS –60.7 million (2010)
- Net income: NIS –61.6 million (2010)
- Total assets: NIS 335.8 million (2010)
- Total equity: NIS 296.1 million (2010)

Modiin Energy LP (Hebrew: מודיעין אנרגיה) is a publicly traded company engaged in oil and gas exploration in Israel. It is listed on the TA MidCap 50 Index as well as on the TA Oil and Gas Index of the Tel Aviv Stock Exchange. The company owns rights to drilling licenses in various locations throughout Israel and in Israel's maritime exclusive economic zone.

== Background ==
The Modiin Energy limited partnership was established in 1992 as part of an agreement between Modiin Energy Management (1992) Ltd. and Modiin Energia Neemanut Ltd. 16.94% of the partnership is controlled by IDB Development Corporation, a privately held investment arm of IDB Holdings.

== Portfolio ==
External image
- "Petroleum Rights"—Ministry of National Infrastructures (Israel)

=== Gabriella ===
The Gabriella drilling site, officially designated 378, is located 10–15 kilometers off the shores of Tel Aviv. It encompasses an area of 390 km^{2} and is held jointly by three companies. Modiin owns rights to 70% of the license, Adira Energy Israel Ltd. owns 15%, and Brownstone Energy Inc. owns the remaining 15%. In September 2011, Adira Energy published results of a three-dimensional seismic survey of the area, conducted by Colorado-based geological consultancy firm Gustavson Associates LLC. The survey estimated the license to contain 3.56 trillion cubic feet (1.01×10^{11} m^{3}) of natural gas, as well as 277 million barrels (44,000,000 m^{3}) of oil. Modiin Energy has said it intends to commence drilling operations at Gabriella by the end of 2012.

=== Sarah and Myra ===
The Sarah and Myra sites, officially designated 348 and 347, respectively, are located 70 kilometers off the shores of Hadera. Their area totals 800 km^{2} and are jointly held by eight companies, with Modiin's stake coming to 19.282%. In June 2011, the licensees published results of a three-dimensional seismic survey of the area, conducted by Netherland, Sewell & Associates Inc. The survey estimated the licenses to contain 6.5 trillion cubic feet (1.8×10^{11} m^{3}) of natural gas, as well as 150 million barrels (24,000,000 m^{3}) of oil. Modiin has anticipated that drilling operations at Sarah and Myra will commence in the first quarter of 2012.

=== Yam Hadera ===
The Yam Hadera site, officially designated 383, is located 30 kilometers off the shores of Hadera. It covers 400 km^{2} and is held exclusively by Modiin Energy LP. In December 2011 Modiin published the results of a three-dimensional seismic survey of the area, conducted by Netherland, Sewell & Associates Inc. The survey gave a best estimate of 1.4 TCF of natural gas, as well as 130 million barrels of oil. Modiin anticipates that drilling operations at Yam Hadera will commence by June 2012.

=== Zurim ===
The Zurim site, officially designated 327, is located southwest of the Dead Sea. It encompasses an area of 335 km^{2} and is jointly held by two companies. Zerah owns 85% of the license and Modiin owns the remaining 15%. After the Nature and Parks Authority indicated in August 2011 that it would not authorize drilling new wells at Zurim, Zerah and Modiin petitioned the Petroleum Commissioner to modify the terms of the license so as to approve a workover on an already-existing well, Halamish-1, which had been abandoned in 1995. Modiin notified the Tel Aviv Stock Exchange on 25 September that the commissioner had rejected the Halamish proposal.

== See also ==
- Economy of Israel
- National Infrastructure Minister of Israel
- Leviathan gas field
- Tamar gas field
- List of oil exploration and production companies
