= Saudi Falcons =

- Active: June 6, 1998 – present
- Country: Saudi Arabia
- Branch: Royal Saudi Air Force
- Role: aerobatic flight display team
- Part of: RSAF 7 Wing
- Garrison/HQ: King Faisal Air Base, Tabuk
- Colors: Green, White, Red
- Equipment: 7 aircraft

Aircraft flown
- Trainer: Hawk Mk.165

The Saudi Falcons (Arabic: الصقور السعودية Aṣ-Ṣuqūr as-Suʿūdīyah) is the aerobatics display team of the Royal Saudi Air Force, based at King Faisal Air Base (Saudi Arabia). Also known as No. 88 Squadron RSAF, they have performed since 1999 flying BAe Hawk jet trainers.

== History ==
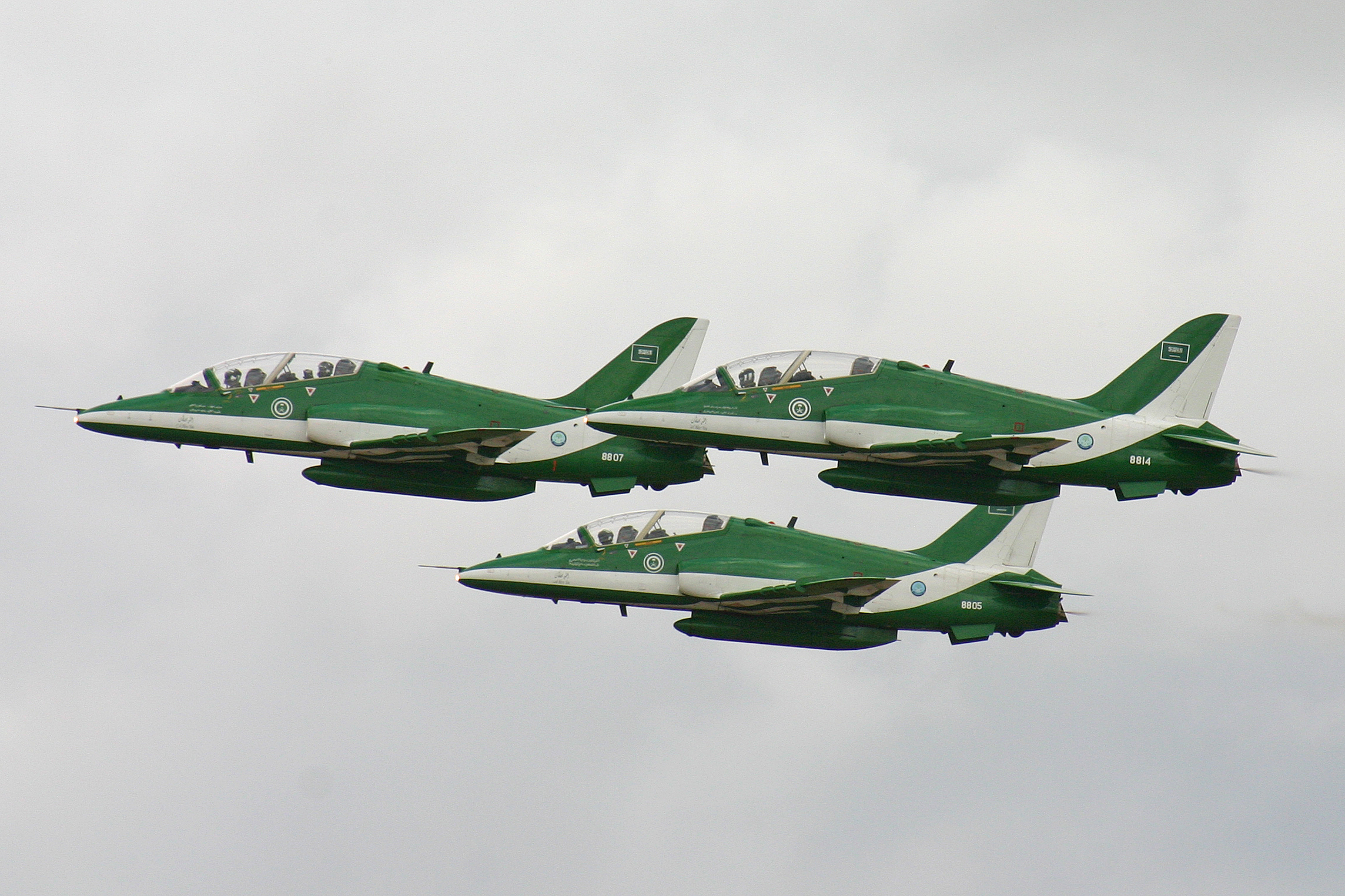
Three Saudi Falcons team BAE Hawks depart RIAT 2011

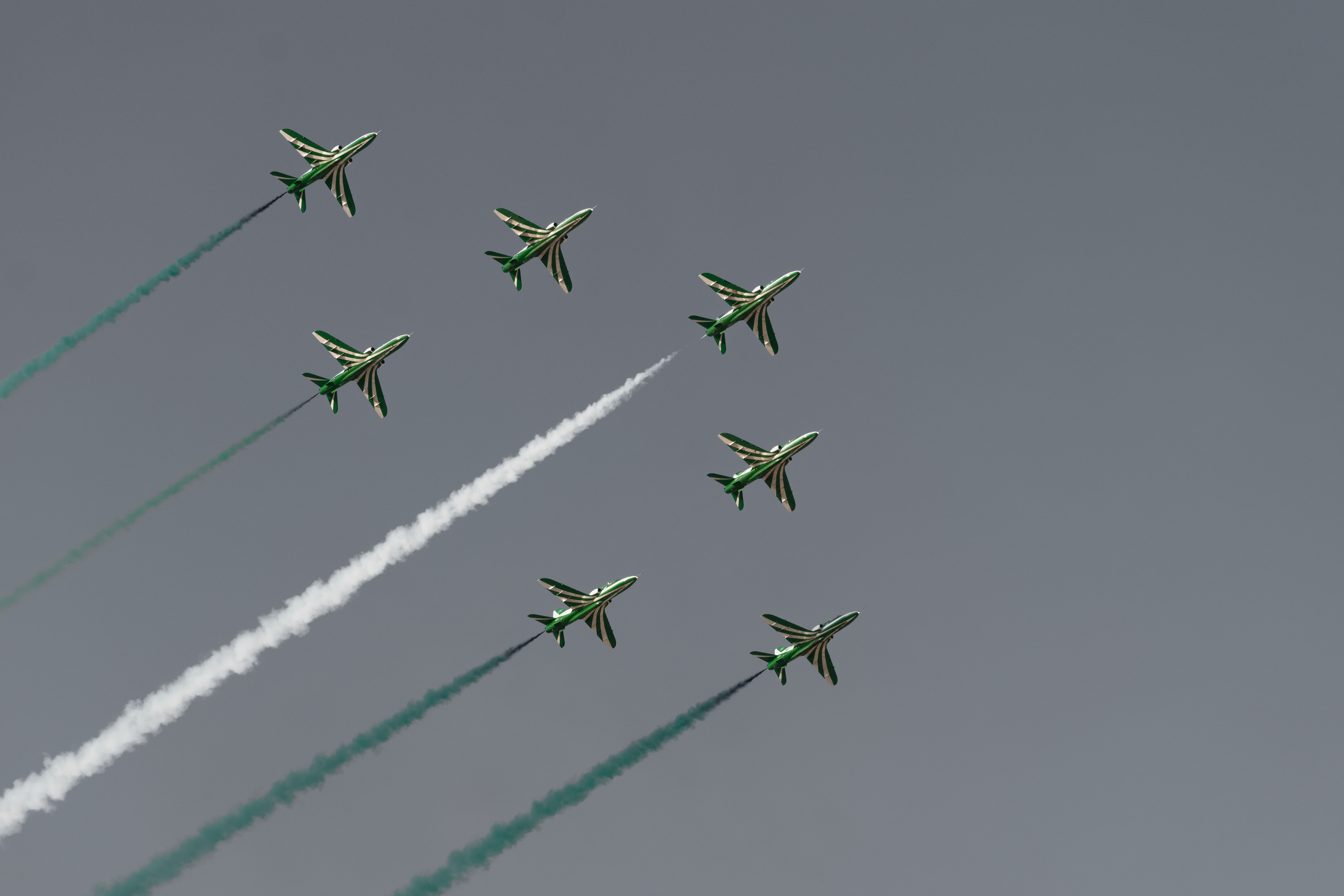
The Saudi Falcons at the 2020 Riyadh in the 90th national day, Saudi Arabia

On June 6, 1998, at King Abdulaziz Air Base (Dhahran), No. 88 Squadron was created by Gen. Abdulaziz Henaidy, the Royal Saudi Air Force's chief of staff, who is backed by Prince Sultan Bin Abdulaziz (Minister of Defense and Aviation). The squadron is known as the "Saudi Falcons Aerobatic Team." Flying BAE Hawk Mk.65 and 65A jet trainers, it is the Royal Saudi Air Force's (RSAF) official demonstration team.

The Falcons debuted in January 1999 at Riyadh, the Saudi kingdom's capital, as part of Saudi Arabia's 100th anniversary celebrations. Six smoke-capable BAE Hawk Mk.65A and three Mk.65s-all modified by BAE Systems are assigned to the team and now wear the team's striking green and white demonstration colors. In February 2000, the Falcons first appeared outside their homeland - in Bahrain, flying out of Dhahran. Soon afterward, the team and the various RSAF Hawk squadrons moved to King Faisal Air Base (Tabuk) in northwestern Saudi Arabia.

The team draws comparison with the RAF Red Arrows due to the similar aircraft. There are tangible links as ex-Red Arrows personnel have been involved in training the team.

From June 2002, the team toured the kingdom for four months and performed at civil and military shows. The team performed its first ever display in Europe at the Air Power 2011 in Zeltweg.

In July 2011, they displayed in the UK for the first time. The display was cancelled on the first day of the Royal International Air Tattoo at RAF Fairford due to bad weather, but they flew a rolling display the following day.

In June 2014, they displayed in the Kavala AirSea Show which was held in Kavala, Greece.

On 6 September 2015, they displayed in front of 450,000 spectators at the airshow dedicated to the 55th anniversary of the Frecce Tricolori display team at Rivolto Air Base, Italy.

In January 2018, they displayed in the Kuwait Air Show, Kuwait.

In July 2023, they displayed at RAF Waddington Families Evening (England) and Royal International Air Tattoo at RAF Fairford.

In February 2024, the team were presented with their first Hawk Mk. 165 aircraft, celebrating the team’s 25th anniversary.

In September 2026, the first international appearance in new indentity at Al Alamein, Big airshow in Egypt.

== See also ==
- List of military installations in Saudi Arabia
