= ILDC Energy =

Israeli gas and oil exploration company

The Israel Land Development Company - Energy Ltd. (ILDC Energy) was founded in March 2010 and since then engages in gas and oil exploration in Israel. Its holding company is the Israel Land Development Company Ltd. (ILDC).

In addition to its current operations, the Company presently conducts preliminary checks of further options, in the fields of alternative energy, renewable energy and oil and gas exploration in various sites elsewhere in the world. Since the end of November 2010, the Company has been a public company traded on the Tel Aviv Stock Exchange and since December 2011, it is included in the T-A 100 Index, the T-A 75 Index and the T-A Oil & Gas Index. ILDC Energy operates directly and via Company-controlled corporations.

== Sara and Myra ==
The Company holds two offshore drilling licenses: 347/”Myra” and 348/”Sara” through Emanuelle Energy Ltd. (“Emanuelle Energy”), a private company fully owned by the Company, and through Emanuelle Energy – Gas and Oil Exploration (“Emanuelle Partnership”), a limited partnership also fully owned by the Company together with its holding company – The Israel Land Development Company Ltd. (“ILDC") which holds 5% of the rights, working interests totaling approximately 46.6% The Sara and Myra license sites are spanning 400 square kilometers each, within Israel’s economic waters, located approximately 40 km west of Hadera, south of the Dalit and Tamar gas deposits. The other partners in these licenses include the IDB Group and the Ofer Brothers.

The Company and its partners in the Sara and Myra licenses are executing the work plan approved by the Commissioner of Oil Affairs in the Ministry of Energy & Water, and expect to start drilling in the course of the second quarter of 2012.

== Additional Licenses in Israel ==
ILDC Energy holds approximately 37% of the share capital of Geo Global Resources Inc. (“GGR”), as well as an option and additional rights in GGR which, once exercised, will bring the Company’s shareholding to exceed 50% of GGR. Geo Global Resources Inc. (GGR) is an American public company which trades in Amex stock exchange as of 2004. The company is an operator for exploration and production of oil and gas reserves with experience in deep water and land drilling.

== World Activity ==
ILDC Energy holds approx. 51% of the share capital of Emanuelle Adriatic Energy Ltd., which has reached agreement with the representative of the Government of Albania about receiving rights to develop, produce and sell hydrocarbons (oil & gas) in 3 maritime blocks in the Adriatic Sea, spanning a total area of some 5,070 square kilometers off the Albanian shore and under Albanian control, subject to the signing of a detailed agreement and receiving regulatory permits.

On May 11, 2012 a fully owned subsidiary of the ILDC Energy, Emanuelle International, submitted an offer in a tender published by the Government of Cyprus, bearing on the acquisition of exploration and production rights of oil and/or gas in the economic waters of Cyprus.
