= Eleftheres =

Eleftheres Ελευθερές
- Municipal unit
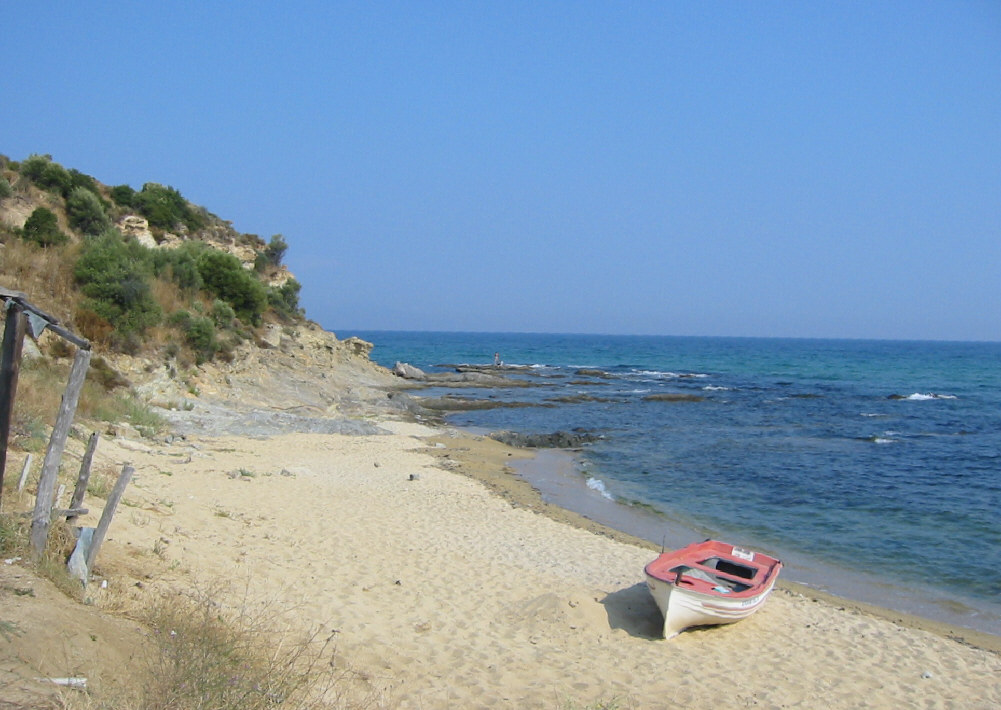
- Beach in the Eleftheres Municipality

- Location within the regional unit

- Location within Greece
- Coordinates: 40°50′N 24°18′E
- Country: Greece
- Administrative region: East Macedonia and Thrace
- Regional unit: Kavala
- Municipality: Pangaio

Area
  - Municipal unit: 150.6 km^{2} (58.1 sq mi)

Population (2021)
  - Municipal unit: 8,647
  - Municipal unit density: 57.42/km^{2} (148.7/sq mi)
  - Community: 1,279
- Time zone: UTC+2 (EET)
  - Summer (DST): UTC+3 (EEST)
- Postal code: 64007
- Area code: 25940
- Vehicle registration: ΚΒ

Eleftheres (Greek: Ελευθερές, romanized: Eleftherés) is a village and a former municipality in the Kavala regional unit, East Macedonia and Thrace, Greece. Since the 2011 local government reform it is part of the municipality Pangaio, of which it is a municipal unit. The municipal unit has an area of 150.555 km^{2}. The seat of the municipality was Nea Peramos. The other villages in this municipal unit are Agios Andreas, Eleftheres, Elaiochori, Folia, Myrtofyto and Nea Iraklitsa.

According to the statistics of Vasil Kanchov ("Macedonia, Ethnography and Statistics"), 300 Greek Christians and 300 Greek Muslims lived in the village in 1900.
