= Karish gas field =

Natural gas field in the Mediterranean

The Karish gas field (Hebrew: מאגר כריש lit. "Shark Reservoir") is an offshore Israel natural gas field located in the Eastern Mediterranean. It lies in proximity to the significantly larger Leviathan and Tamar gas fields. These fields, as well as Karish, produce gas from the Tamar Sands geological formation. The field was initially allocated to a consortium of companies including Noble Energy (now Chevron) and Delek, but due to their monopolistic position in the Israeli market (as owners of the Tamar and Leviathan fields), Delek and Noble were forced by regulators to sell their rights in the field. As a result, the two companies sold Karish and the adjacent Tanin gas field to the Greek oil company Energean in 2016 for $150 million. The Karish and Tanin gas fields together are estimated to hold 2–3 trillion cubic feet of gas.

The field came online in the third quarter of 2022. As a deal was struck ending the Israeli–Lebanese maritime border dispute, Israel maintained control of Karish, and gas began flowing from the field on October 26, 2022.

In the aftermath of a June 2022 energy deal between the European Union, Egypt and Israel, experts project gas from Karish will eventually be exported to Europe, as the European Union navigates the 2022 Russia–European Union gas dispute.

== Development of the field ==
A plan for developing the field was officially presented in August 2017 by the Israeli Ministry of Energy. The plan involves the anchoring of a ship 90 kilometers (56 miles) offshore, where the gas from the two fields will be treated and prepared for export. A statement by Energean said that the floating production storage and offloading (FPSO) facility will have a gas treatment capacity of 8 BCM per year. It will be linked to facilities on the Israeli shore through a 90-kilometer gas pipeline, allowing connection to the domestic sales grid operated by the national gas transmission company.

In 2018, Energean CEO Mathias Rigas said that he expected drilling at the fields to begin in 2019 and that gas would begin to be supplied in the first quarter of 2021. However, the COVID-19 pandemic-induced delays postponed the commencement of gas production to the third quarter of 2022.

In November 2019, Energean said that its appraisal of a section of Karish known as Karish North revealed 0.9 trillion cubic feet (tcf) of recoverable natural gas resources plus 34 million barrels of light oil or condensate—an amount significantly larger than originally expected.

In June 2020, Allseas announced that it had completed the installation of the 90.3-kilometer (56-mile), 30-inch, and 24-inch gas sales pipeline in water depths of up to 1,700 meters (5,577 feet). At the same time, TechnipFMC announced that it had installed the production manifold as well as subsea isolation valve foundations and structures.

In August 2020, Energean publicized that it had completed the electrical house (E-house) section containing all FPSO electronic control and uninterruptible power supply (UPS) systems aboard the rig under construction at the Admiralty Shipyard in Singapore.

In December 2020, Energean announced that it had entered into a new set of agreements with Rapac Energy Limited and its related companies to supply an average of 0.4 BCM a year of gas for six-to-fifteen-year terms starting from first gas at Karish.

On 26 October 2022, Energean started the development and production of gas from Karish.

== Disputes involving the field ==
In November 2019, Tsabar Gas and Oil filed a 600 Million NIS lawsuit against Energean claiming that Energean did not abide by its agreements with Tsabar involving Karish and that Energean had denied Tsabar its fair share. Tsabar asserts that it played a role in enabling Energean to purchase the rights to the field. Energean responded that Tsabar's claims were baseless.

In October 2020, Lebanon claimed that a 550-square-mile area also containing the Karish gas field should be part of its exclusive economic zone in addition to an already disputed 330-square-mile area. In November 2020, Israel rejected Lebanon's position out of hand. To that end, Israeli Energy Ministry CEO Udi Adiri sent a letter to Energean CEO Shaul Tzemach clarifying that the ministry has been instructed that no talks should be held with Lebanon on areas outside the disputed waters mentioned in the guidelines deposited with the United Nations in 2011.

After years of indirect negotiations between the two parties, mediated by the United States and diplomat Amos Hochstein, Israeli and Lebanese negotiators reached a deal on the disputed area on October 11, 2022. The text of the deal states Israel is to maintain control of Karish, while Lebanon will be given control of the Qana gas prospect. Subsequent exploratory drilling completed in October 2023 failed to find commercial quantities of gas in the Qana prospect.

== See also ==
- Natural gas in Israel
