= Olive and Oil Museum (Eleochori) =

Museum in Greece

Coordinates: 40.82022°N 24.24854°E

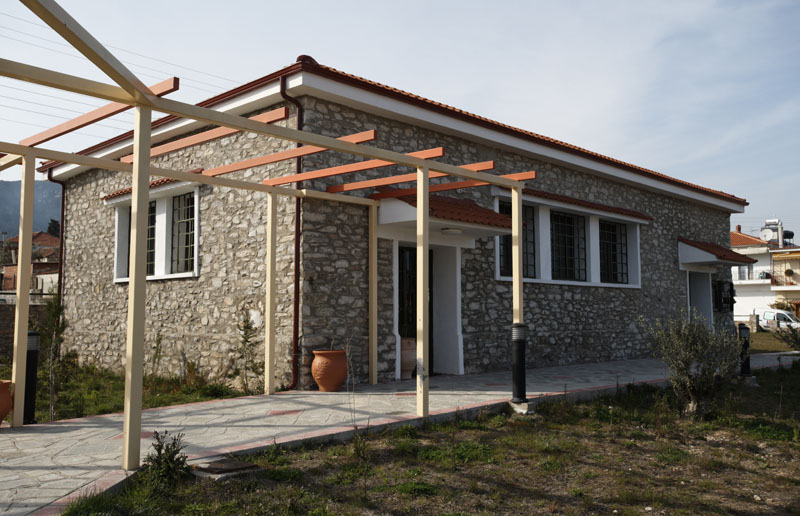
External view

The Olive and Oil Museum is a museum located in Elaiochori, a village in Eastern Macedonia, Greece, 25 km (16 mi) from the city of Kavala. It belongs to the Municipality of Paggaio since 2011 (see Kallikratis Programme) and it is one of its kind in Eastern Macedonia and Thrace. The museum, which opened in 2008, covers a total area of 3,000 m^{2} (32,000 sq ft). The aforementioned area contains a modern exhibition sector with an event room, open air theatre, tree-planted surrounding spaces and the old olive mill that has been fully renovated along with its mechanical equipment.

The museum is housed in the building of the village's old oil press, which, since it began operating in 1950, contributed significantly to the development of the community and the western region of Kavala. The oil press was abandoned in 1970, but was recently rebuilt with funding from the Third Community Support Framework and is now owned by the Municipal Utility Company of Eleftherai (a.k.a. K.E.D.Ε.).

The purpose of the museum is to help preserve tools of traditional olive cultivation, processing and distribution of oil of traditional art, as practiced in the region. All equipment is original, repaired and can function normally. Among others there are the crusher, the press, and the container-separator of olive oil from water. In the utility room, the one that was once used for administrative work, can be found tools for growing olives (e.g. secateurs, nets, etc.), a collection of panniers and items relevant to the extraction and storage of olive oil (see millstones, demijohns etc.).

In the courtyard there is an exhibition of machinery for the classification of olives by size, and containers for the collection and storage of olive oil.

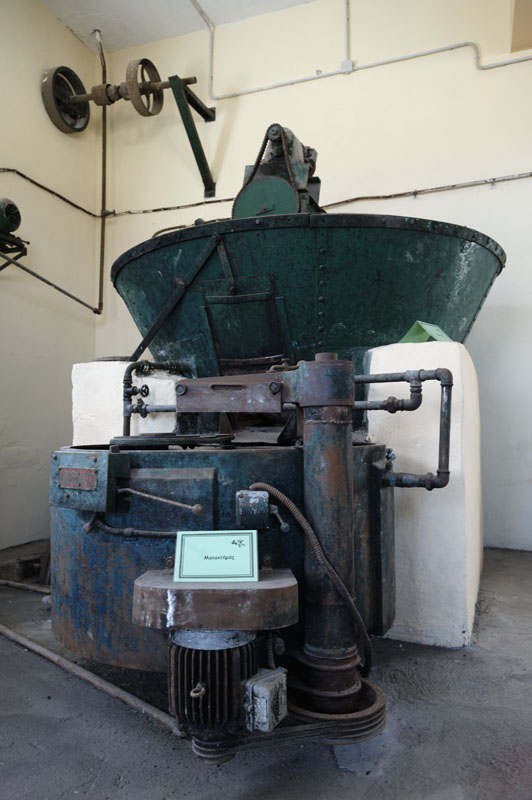
The old crusher

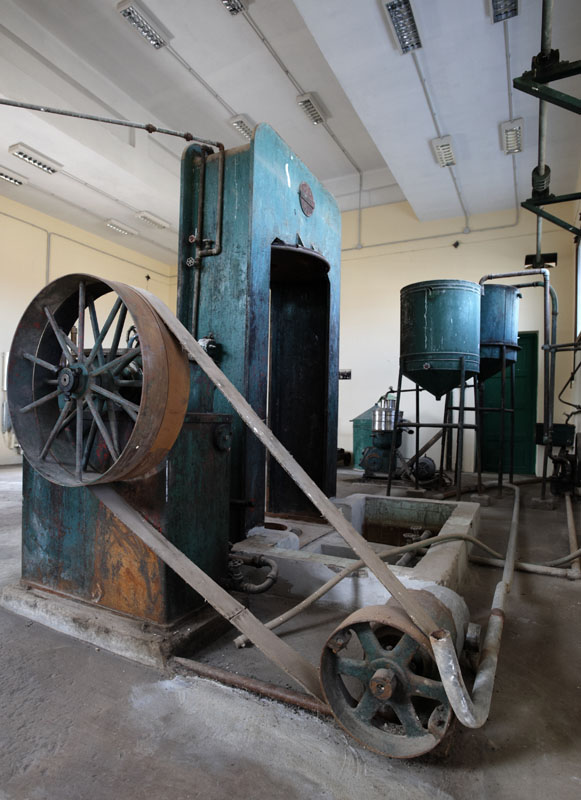
Pressing machinery
