= Elaiochori, Kavala =

Elaiochori Ελαιοχώρι
- Community
- Location within Greece
- Coordinates: 40°49′N 24°14′E
- Country: Greece
- Administrative region: East Macedonia and Thrace
- Regional unit: Kavala
- Municipality: Pangaio
- Municipal unit: Eleftheres
- Elevation: 90 m (300 ft)

Population (2021)
  - Community: 998
- Time zone: UTC+2 (EET)
  - Summer (DST): UTC+3 (EEST)
- Postal code: 640 07
- Area code: 25940
- Vehicle registration: ΚΒ

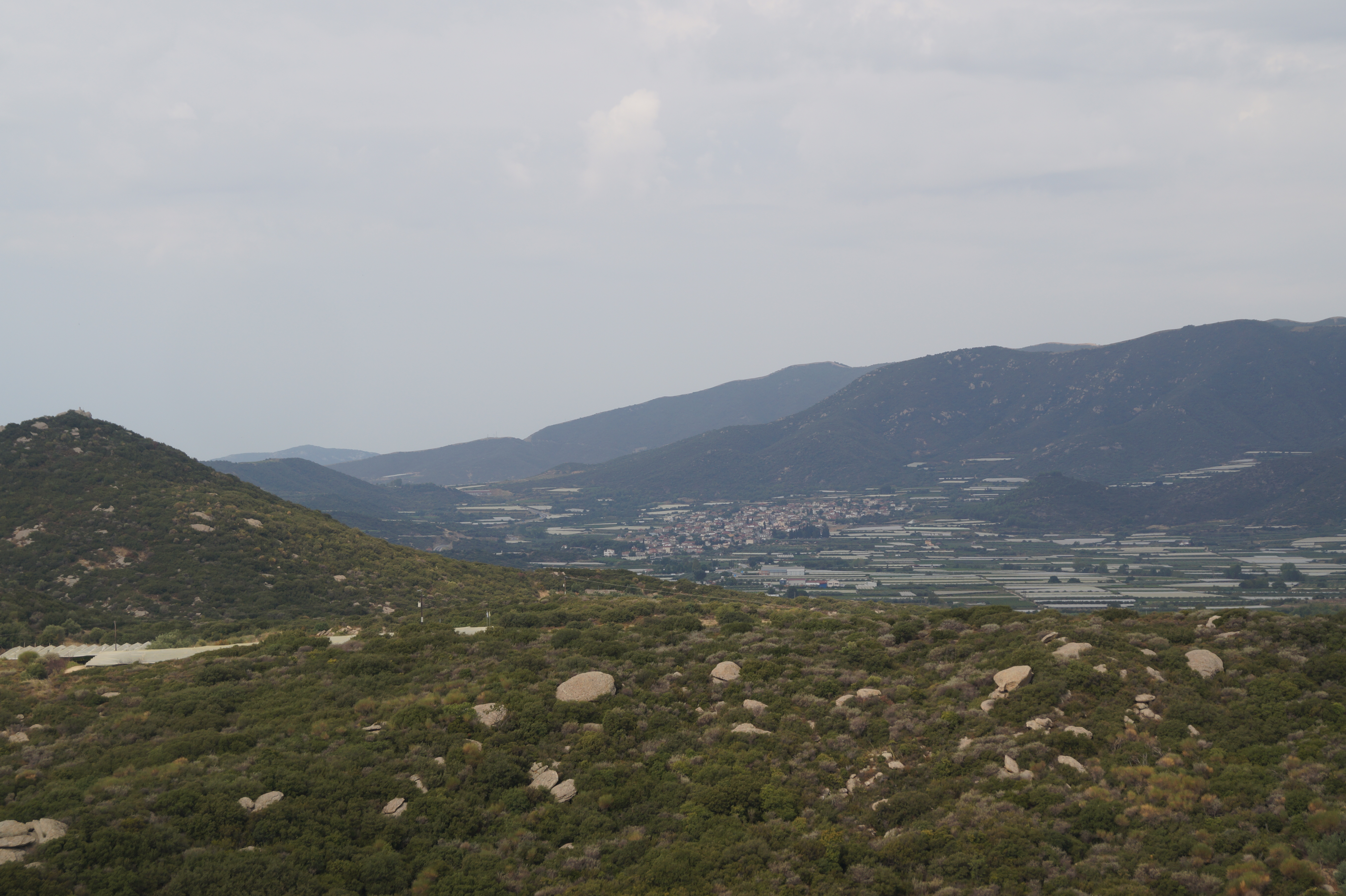
Elaiochori Kavala

Elaiochori (Greek: Ελαιοχώρι Greek pronunciation: [eleoˈxori]), is a village and part of the municipal unit of Eleftheres in the southwest of the Kavala regional unit, Greece. Population 998 (2021). The Olive and Oil Museum is located in the village.

== Name ==
The Greek name of the village, Ελαιοχώρι, means village of olive trees.

== See also ==
- List of settlements in the Kavala regional unit
