= Natural gas in Israel =

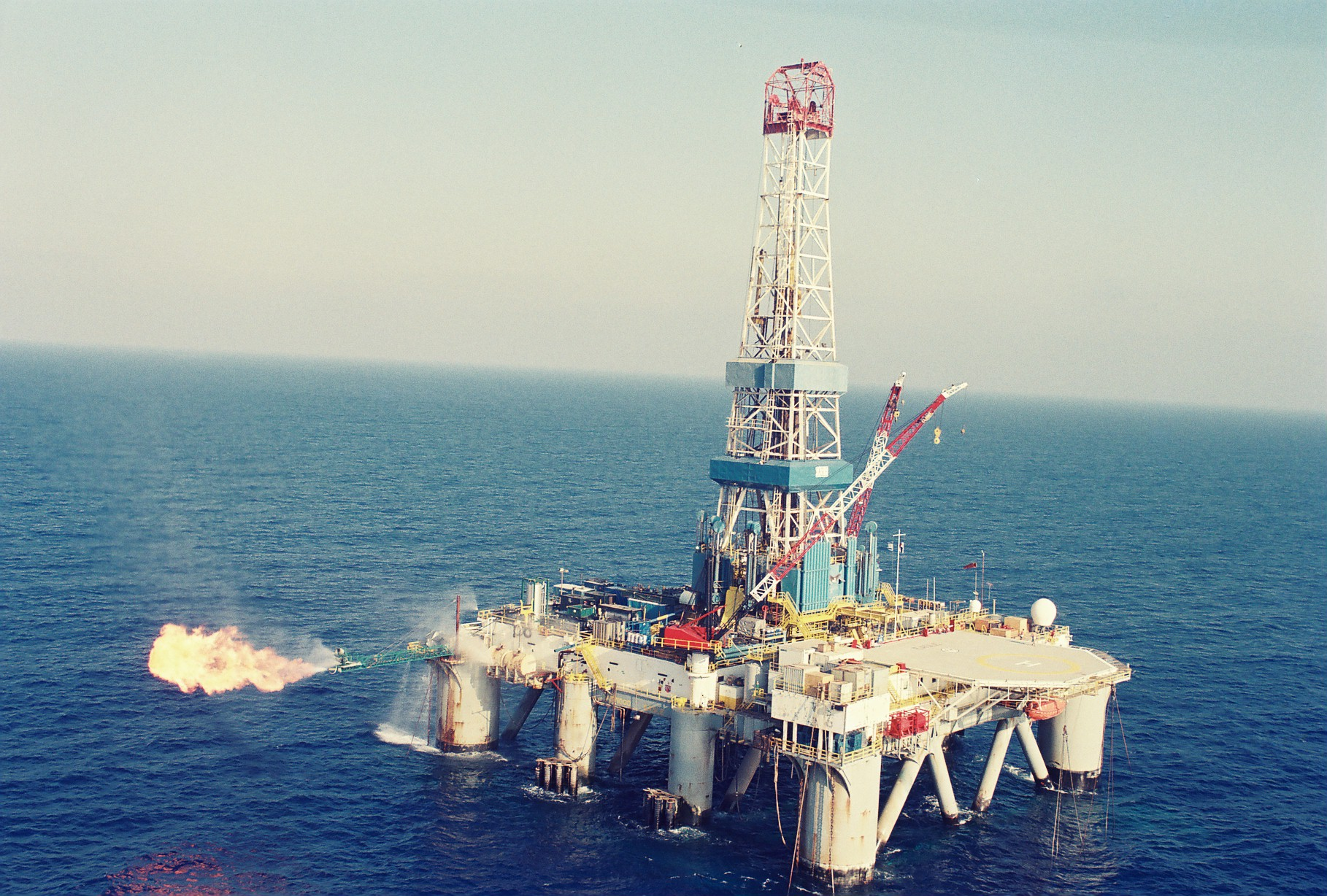
Noa natural gas field, offshore Ashkelon

Natural gas in Israel is the country's primary energy source for electricity production. Israel began producing natural gas from its own offshore gas fields in 2004. Between 2005 and 2012, Israel imported gas from Egypt via the al-Arish-Ashkelon pipeline, an arrangement that ended due to Egyptian Crisis of 2011-14. In 2017, Israel was producing over 9 billion cubic meters (bcm) of natural gas a year. Israel had 1,087 billion cubic meters (cu m) of proven reserves of natural gas as of 2022. In early 2017, Israel began exporting natural gas to the Kingdom of Jordan.

== History ==
Israeli natural gas lines network map

Consumption of fossil fuel energy sources in Israel since 1980. Coal consumption rose steadily since 1980 when it was negligible. Natural gas consumption was nearly zero in 2003 and has risen steadily since.

Historically, Israel relied on external imports for meeting most of its energy needs, spending an amount equivalent to over 5% of its GDP per year in 2009 on imports of energy products. The transportation sector relies mainly on gasoline and diesel fuel, while the majority of electricity production was generated using imported coal. As of 2013, Israel was importing about 100 million barrels of oil per year. The country possesses negligible reserves of crude oil but does have abundant domestic natural gas resources which were discovered in large quantities starting in 2009, after many decades of previously unsuccessful exploration.

Until the early 2000s, natural gas use in Israel was minimal. In the late 1990s, the government of Israel decided to encourage the usage of natural gas because of environmental, cost, and resource diversification reasons. At the time however, there were no domestic sources of natural gas and the expectation was that gas would be supplied from overseas in the form of LNG and by a future pipeline from Egypt (which eventually became the Arish–Ashkelon pipeline). Plans were made for the Israel Electric Corporation to construct several gas-driven power plants, for erecting a national gas distribution grid, and for an LNG import terminal. Soon thereafter, gas began to be located within Israeli territory, first in modest amounts and a decade later in very large quantities located in deep water off the Israeli coastline. This has greatly intensified the utilization of natural gas within the Israeli economy, especially in the electrical generation and industrial sectors, with consumption growing from an annual average of 9,900,000 m^{3} (350×10^{6} cu ft) between 2000 and 2002 to 3.7×10^{9} m^{3} (129×10^{9} cu ft) in 2010.

In 2023 Cyprus and Israel were working on a deal to create a natural gas pipeline between the two countries, whereas Israeli natural gas would be liquified and exported to Europe. The American energy company Chevron is reportedly interested in the potential pipeline, which would be 320-kilometer (200-mile) in length and estimated to cost 450 million euros ($489 million), while the liquefaction plant would cost 1 billion euros ($1.1 billion). The pipeline would take about two and a half years to build.

Natural Gas Usage in Israel
| 2004 | 2005 | 2006 | 2007 | 2008 | 2009 | 2010 | 2011 | 2012 | 2013 | 2014 | 2015 | 2016 | 2017 | 2018 | 2019 |
|---|---|---|---|---|---|---|---|---|---|---|---|---|---|---|---|
| 1.2 | 1.6 | 2.3 | 2.7 | 3.7 | 4.2 | 5.2 | 5 | 2.6 | 6.9 | 7.6 | 8.4 | 9.7 | 10.3 | 11.1 | 11.3 |
Figures are in Billion Cubic Meters (BCM) per year

== Discoveries in the 2000s ==
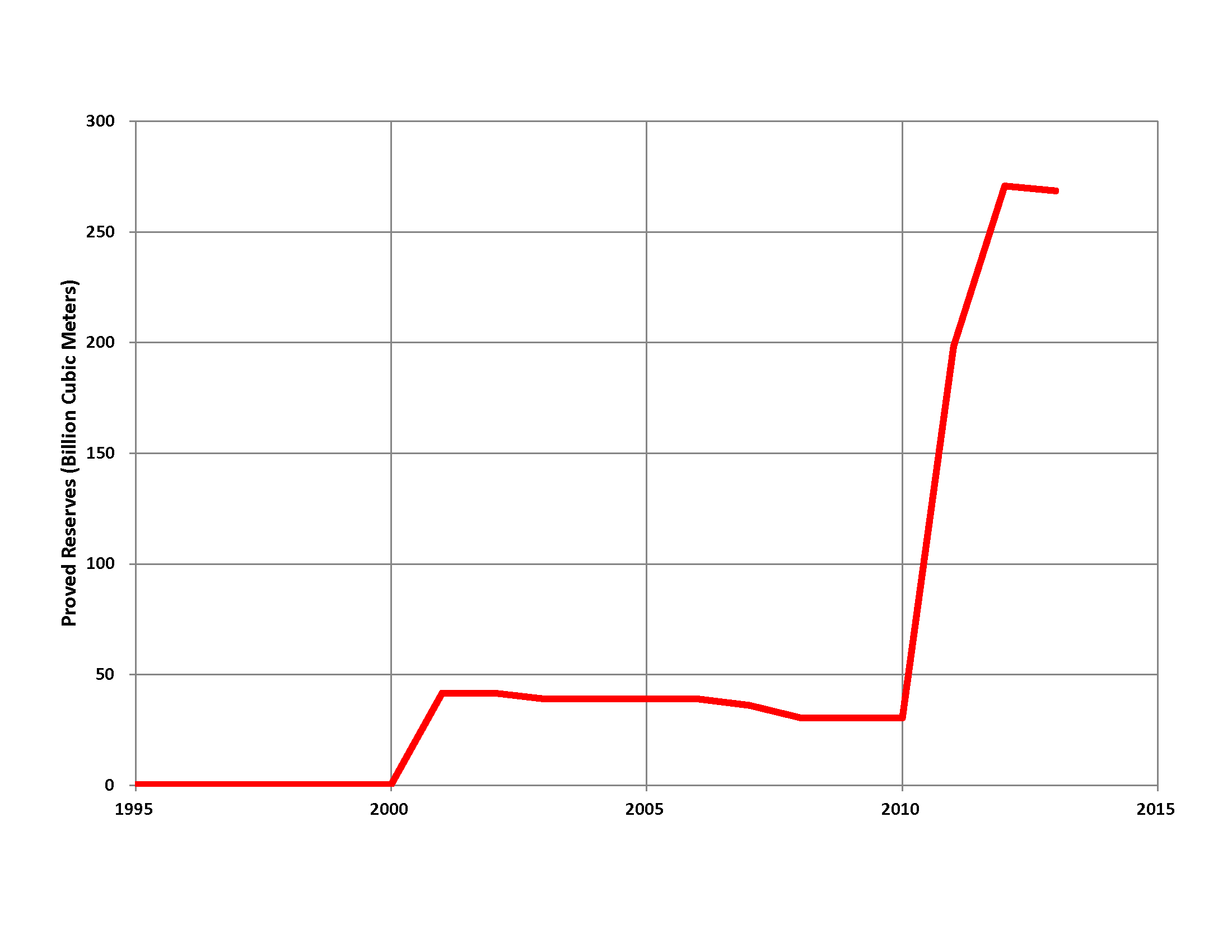
Proved reserves of natural gas in Israel

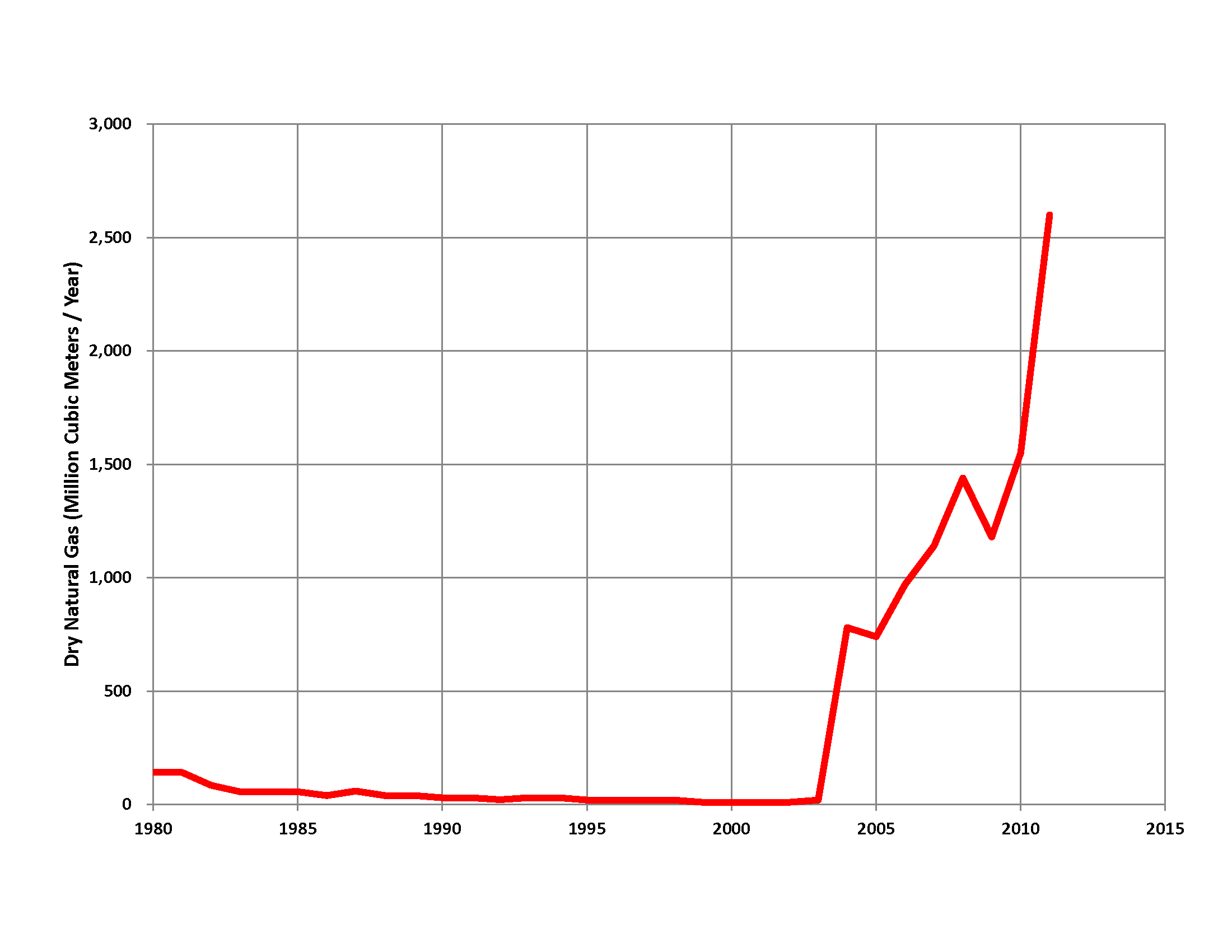
Production of natural gas in Israel, 1980-2012 (US Energy Information Administration)

In 2000, a 33-billion-cubic-metre (BCM), or 1,200-billion-cubic-foot, natural-gas field was discovered off the coast of Ashkelon, with commercial production starting in 2004. As of 2014 however, this field is nearly depleted—earlier than expected due to increased pumping to partially compensate for the loss of imported Egyptian gas in the wake of unrest associated with the fall of the Mubarak regime in 2011. In 2009, a significant gas find named Tamar, with proven reserves of 223 BCM or 7.9×10^{12} cu ft (307 BCM total proven + probable) was located in deep water approximately 90 km (60 mi) west of Haifa, as well as a smaller 15 BCM (530×10^{9} cu ft) field situated nearer the coastline. Furthermore, results of 3D seismic surveys and test drilling conducted since 2010 have confirmed that an estimated 621 BCM (21.9×10^{12} cu ft) natural-gas deposit exists in a large underwater geological formation nearby the large gas field already discovered in 2009. The US Energy Information Administration listed Israel as having 6.2 trillion cubic feet of proved reserves as of 1 January 2015.

The discoveries of natural gas confirmed that the Levant basin of the Eastern Mediterranean contains significant quantities of natural gas. Consequently, additional exploration for gas off Israel's coastline is continuing. In early 2012 the Israeli cabinet announced plans to set up a sovereign wealth fund (called "the Israeli Citizens' Fund") that would allocate part of the royalties from energy exploration to education, defense and overseas investments.

The Tamar field began commercial production on 30 March 2013 after four years of extensive development. The supply of gas from Tamar is expected to provide a boost to the Israeli economy, which has suffered losses of more than NIS20 billion between 2011 and 2013 resulting from the disruption of gas supplies from neighboring Egypt (and which are not expected to resume due to Egypt's decision to indefinitely suspend its gas supply agreement to Israel). As a result, Israel, as well as neighboring Jordan, which also suffered from disruption of gas deliveries from Egypt, had to resort to importing significantly more expensive and polluting liquid heavy fuels as substitute sources of energy. The ensuing energy crisis in Israel was lifted once the Tamar field came online in 2013, while Jordan committed to a US$10 billion, 15-year gas supply deal totaling 45 BCM from the Israeli Leviathan field, which came online in late 2019. The agreement is estimated to save Jordan US$600 million per year in energy costs.

In 2018, the owners of the Tamar and Leviathan fields announced that they were negotiating an agreement with a consortium of Egyptian firms, subject to regulatory approval in both countries, for the supply of up to 64 BCM of gas over 10 years valued at up to US$15 billion. Although Egypt has been making strides in developing new gas fields to meet rising domestic demand, it also had idle LNG exporting capacity.

In late October 2022, Energean started gas production from the Karish field. In late November 2022 Energean announced a new commercial natural gas discovery of 13 billion cubic meters off the shore of Israel as a result of its exploratory drilling well dubbed Zeus.

| Field | Discovered | Production | Estimated size (cubic feet) | bcm |
|---|---|---|---|---|
| Noa North | 1999 | 2012 to 2014 | 50 bcf; field depleted | |
| Mari-B | 2000 | 2004 to 2015 | 1 tcf; field depleted | |
| Tamar | 2009 | 2013 | 10.8 tcf (trillion cubic feet) | |
| Dalit | 2009 | Not in production | 700 bcf (billion cubic feet) | |
| Leviathan | 2010 | 2019 | 22 tcf | |
| Dolphin | 2011 | Not in production | 81.3 bcf | |
| Tanin | 2012 | Not in production | 1.2–1.3 tcf | |
| Karish | 2013 | 2022 | 2.3–3.6 tcf | |
| Zeus | 2022 | Not in production | 0.46 tcf | 13 |
| Athena | 2022 | Not in production | 0.41 tcf | 11.75 |
| Hermes | 2022 | Not in production | 0.53 tcf | 15 |
| Katlan | 2022 | Not in production | 2.4 tcf | 68 |

== Power stations ==
List of Natural gas-fired power stations in Israel:

- Dalia Power Station
- Dorad Power Station
- Eshkol Power Station
- Mishor Rotem Power Station
- Reading Power Station

== See also ==
- Energy in Israel
- Energy Triangle
- Economy of Israel
- Arab Gas Pipeline
