= Randa Slim =

Lebanese-American foreign-policy professional

Randa Slim is a Lebanese-American foreign-policy professional specializing in Track II diplomacy.

== Career ==
Slim is founding director of the Initiative for Track II Dialogues at the Middle East Institute as well as a senior research fellow at the Johns Hopkins School of Advanced International Studies' Foreign Policy Institute and the New America Foundation.

She has said that her interest in Track II diplomacy—so-called to distinguish conflict-resolution conversations that are not part of official Track I talks—came from her experiences as a girl during the Lebanese Civil War.

From 1991 to 2000, Slim worked at the Kettering Foundation on the Dartmouth Conferences, confidential U.S.-Soviet, then U.S.-Russian, discussions that began in 1961 at Dartmouth College. She was part of the multi-year Inter-Tajik Dialogue.

After the September 11 attacks on New York City and Washington, D.C., Slim decided to become involved in Track II diplomacy in the Middle East. She worked on an Iraqi national reconciliation dialogue involving Iraqi parliamentarians, tribal leaders and representatives of Iraqi opposition groups. After the Syrian civil war broke out in 2011, Slim initiated Track II diplomacy aimed at resolving the conflict. She particularly emphasized making women part of the conflict-resolution dialogue.

The BBC's Kim Ghattas wrote in Foreign Policy, "The sessions organized by Slim continue, and they stand out because unlike most 'Track II' dialogues, which include only former officials and experts, these include advisors and aides to current officials. Both Saudis and Iranians have attended all the sessions." As director of the Middle East Institute's Initiative for Track II Dialogues, Slim seeks to extend non-official talks to help resolve conflicts across the region.
