= Nea Peramos, Kavala =

Nea Peramos Νέα Πέραμος
- Community
- Location within Greece
- Coordinates: 40°50.3′N 24°18.2′E
- Country: Greece
- Administrative region: East Macedonia and Thrace
- Regional unit: Kavala
- Municipality: Pangaio
- Municipal unit: Eleftheres

Population (2021)
  - Community: 3,516
- Time zone: UTC+2 (EET)
  - Summer (DST): UTC+3 (EEST)

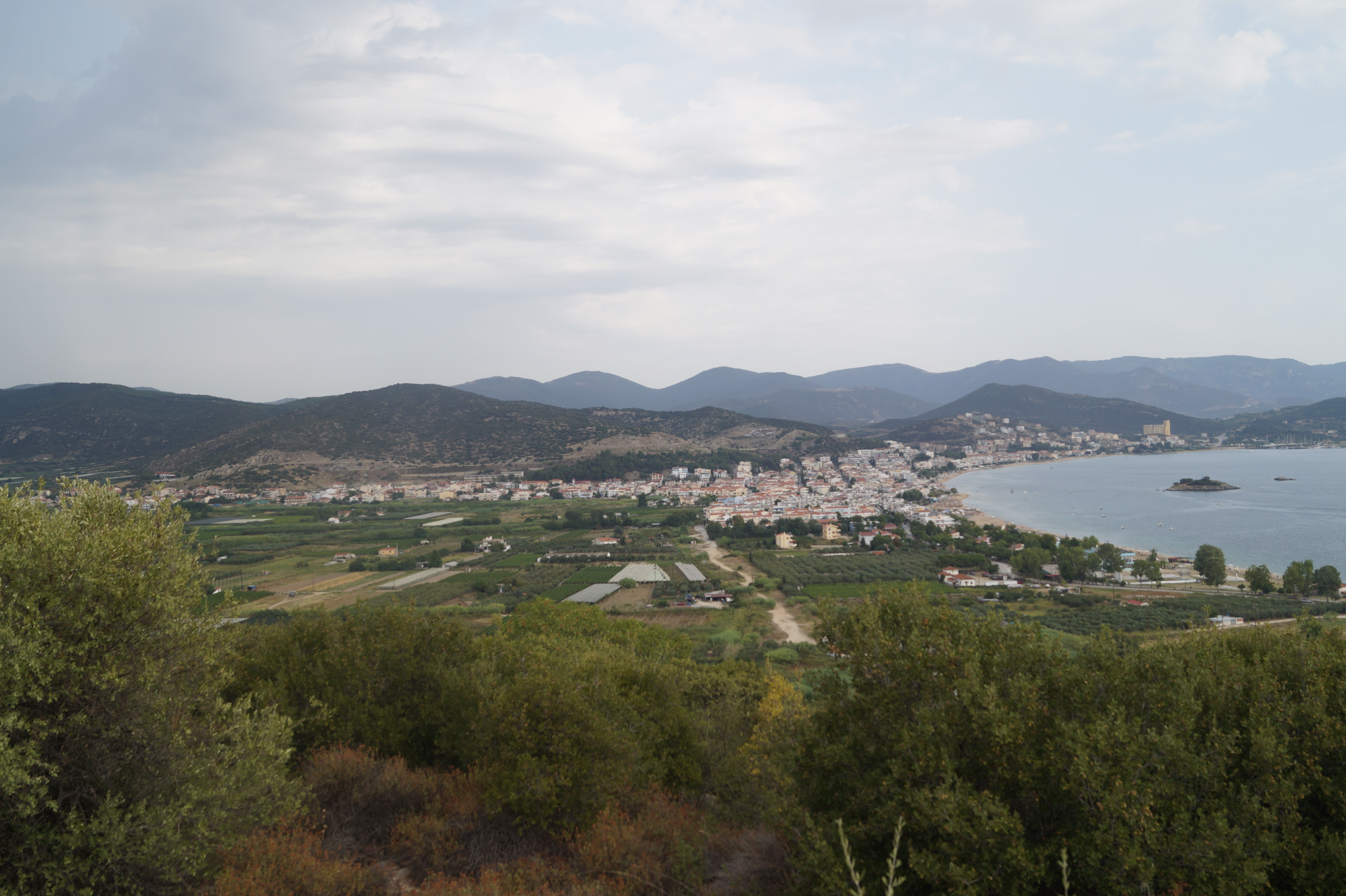
Nea Peramos

Nea Peramos (Greek: Νέα Πέραμος) is a town 17 kilometres from Kavala, the capital of the regional unit of Kavala, Greece. Its population at the 2021 census was 3,516.

Nea Peramos was settled in 1924 by Greek refugees from Peramos in Asia Minor (today Karsiyaka, Erdek in Turkey) following the Population exchange. Since 1998, according to the Law of Kapodistrias, seven villages (Nea Peramos, Nea Iraklitsa, Agios Andreas, Eleftheres, Elaiochori, Myrtofyto, Folea) joined in a new municipality which was called Municipality of Eleftheres. The central administration authority resided in Nea Peramos, which is the largest of the villages listed above. The first Mayor of the Community of Eleftheres was Iraklis Karaberidis. At the 2011 Kallikratis reform, the municipality of Eleftheres became part of the new municipality of Pangaio.

Nea Peramos is one hour from the island of Thasos, to the city of Kavala, and also to ancient Philippi, which is about 30 km distant.
