= Prinos, Thasos =

Village in Thasos, Greece

Prinos Πρίνος
- Community
- Location within Greece
- Coordinates: 40°40′N 24°40′E
- Country: Greece
- Administrative region: East Macedonia and Thrace
- Regional unit: Thasos
- Municipality: Thasos

Population (2021)
  - Community: 1,330
- Time zone: UTC+2 (EET)
  - Summer (DST): UTC+3 (EEST)
- Website: www.thassos.gr

Prinos (Greek: Πρίνος) is a village on the island of Thasos in northern Greece. The village is located in the northwest of the island, 17.4 km southwest from the island's capital and main port of Limenas, and 21.8 km north of Limenaria (in the south of Thasos). The village of Skala Prinou (Σκάλα Πρίνου) is home to the second largest ferry port on the island, with regular routes to Kavala and twice weekly to Nea Peramos which is only for commercial traffic, on mainland Greece.

The village of Prinos hosts a market each Monday.
