= Energean =

Hydrocarbon exploration and production company

Energean plc
- Company type: Public
- Traded as: LSE: ENOG; FTSE 250 component
- Industry: Energy
- Founded: 2007; 19 years ago
- Headquarters: London, United Kingdom
- Area served: Southeast Europe, North Africa
- Key people: Karen Simon (Chairman); Mathios Rigas (CEO)
- Products: Oil and Gas Exploration; Natural Gas Trading; Oil Refining
- Revenue: ▼US$1,728.1 million (2025)
- Operating income: ▼US$268.0 million (2025)
- Net income: ▼US$(257.6) million (2025)
- Total assets: ▼US$5,589.3 million (2025)
- Total equity: ▼US$141.6 million (2025)
- Owner: UBS Asset Management (17.5%); Stathis Topouzoglou (9.47%); Leumi Partners Ltd. (8.70%); Mathios Rigas (8.34%)
- Website: www.energean.com

Energean plc is an international hydrocarbon exploration and production company, with a focus on natural gas. It is listed on the London Stock Exchange as well as the Tel Aviv Stock Exchange and is a constituent of the FTSE 250 Index.

== History ==
The company was established as Aegean Energy SA, a Greek-owned business, in 2007. It started operations when it acquired Eurotech Services SA from Regal Petroleum in December 2007.

It changed its name to Energean Oil & Gas in 2010 after it started developing sites in the north Aegean Sea. It was then the subject of an initial public offering in March 2018 on the London Stock Exchange. The company listed on the Tel Aviv Stock Exchange in October 2018.

In June 2019, it was reported to be in talks with financial entities to raise up to $1.5 billion. In July 2019, Energean made a deal to buy Italy's Edison oil and gas business for $750 million, which would be funded via a $265 million equity placing and a $600 million loan followed by a further $100 million payment after first gas would be streamed from an Italian gas development. In October 2019, Energean agreed to sell Edison North Sea assets to Neptune Energy Group for up to $280 million as part of an ongoing plan to sell non-core assets.

The company changed its name from Energean Oil & Gas plc to Energean plc in May 2020.

== Operations ==
In December 2016, Energean acquired 100 percent of the Karish and Tanin natural gas fields from Delek Drilling and Avner Oil for $148 million as required by the Israeli government in order to open the sector to competition. In March 2018, the company signed a $1.275 billion financing deal with Bank Hapoalim, Morgan Stanley, Societe Generale, and Natixis in order to develop Karish and Tanin. In March 2019, the company reported that it had begun drilling for natural gas at Karish North in order to verify reserves estimated at up to 36 BCM on top of the already confirmed 67 BCM. In June 2019, Energean signed an agreement with the Israel Natural Gas Lines Company (INGL) to build a reception terminal connected to the Israeli gas transport system, consisting of an undersea segment 10 kilometers from the coast and a coastal land segment near Dor, for NIS 369 million. Excess capacity in the terminal could be used by other producers who wish to connect to the INGL's gas grid. In November 2019, the company said that its appraisal of the Karish North discovery had revealed 1.2 trillion cubic feet of recoverable natural gas resources plus 34 million barrels of light oil, a significant increase from its original estimate. In January 2020, Energean signed a letter of understanding with DEPA, a Greek gas corporation, for the sale of up to 2 BCM of gas annually through the projected undersea gas pipeline to Europe, the construction of which is estimated to cost $9 billion.

Energean expects to bring the Karish field on line in the third quarter of 2022. As of late 2021, the company has signed contracts for the supply of 7.2 billion cubic metre of gas per year (appx. 46 million barrel of oil equivalent/year) to various Israeli consumers from the field out of the 8 BCM total annual production capacity of its FPSO processing vessel.

== Legal issues ==
In November 2019, Energean was sued at the Tel Aviv District Court for NIS 603 million by Tsabar Gas and Oil. The lawsuit claimed that Energean had acted in breach of contract and had deprived Tsabar of its rightful share to the Karish and Tanin fields. In response, Energean denied the claims and asserted that it was the sole owner of the rights to the Karish and Tanin gas fields and that it had acted in complete transparency. On 25 November 2019, Tsabar sent a strongly worded letter to Natural Resources Administration Director and Petroleum Commissioner Yossi Wurzburger in which it complained of allegedly inappropriate conduct by Energean that included Energean's alleged physical refusal to accept a delivery of documents from a messenger informing it of the lawsuit. Energean responded, disputing the claims.
