= Island of Peace massacre =

1997 attack on a group of Israeli schoolgirls in Jordan

- Part of the Arab–Israeli conflict
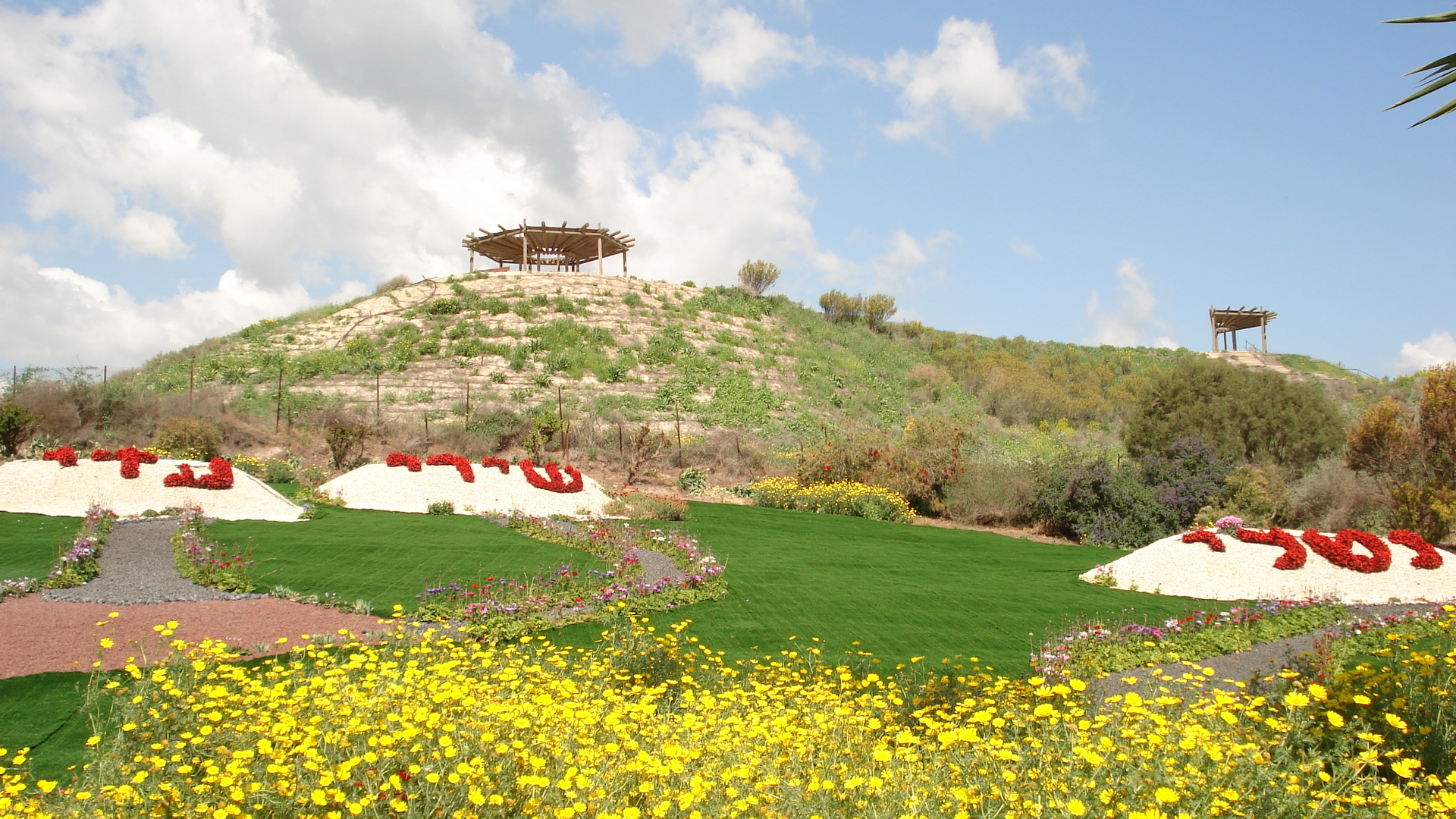
- Memorial for the victims in Naharayim

- Location within Jordan Location relative to Israel
- Native name: הטבח בנהריים; مذبحة جزيرة السلام
- Location: 32°38′26″N 35°34′0″E; Island of Peace, Jordan
- Date: 13 March 1997; 29 years ago
- Attack type: Mass shooting
- Weapon: M16 rifle
- Deaths: 7 Israeli schoolgirls
- Injuries: 6 (five Israeli schoolgirls and a teacher)
- Assailant: Cpl. Ahmad Daqamseh (Royal Jordanian Army)
- Motive: Islamism (per Daqamseh's family) or mental illness (per Jordanian medics)
- Convicted: Daqamseh: 20 years in prison with hard labour

The Island of Peace massacre was a high-profile shooting attack that took place on 13 March 1997, when a Jordanian soldier opened fire on a group of young Israeli schoolgirls and their teacher at the Island of Peace. Seven of the girls were killed, while five more and the teacher were injured; all of the girls in the group were aged 13–14. The perpetrator of the attack was Ahmad Daqamseh, a corporal serving in the Royal Jordanian Army. He had been stationed at the international border between Jordan and Israel, and encountered the girls while they were visiting Jordan's Island of Peace as part of a field trip from their AMIT school in the city of Beit Shemesh. Shortly after the attack began, Daqamseh's M16 rifle jammed and he was subdued by nearby Jordanian soldiers, who then rushed to help the victims.

Daqamseh was arrested and later diagnosed with antisocial personality disorder by a Jordanian medical team. He was tried and convicted by a five-member military tribunal, which sentenced him to 20 years in prison with hard labour.

Shortly after the attack, Jordanian king Hussein bin Talal personally visited the families of the victims and offered his condolences. His trip was seen as a sincere and unusual act in the history of the Arab–Israeli conflict, deeply moving the mourning Israeli public and helping to further improve the relationship between the two countries in light of the 1994 Israel–Jordan peace treaty.

Several Jordanians reacted positively to the attack; Daqamseh was called a "hero" by Jordanian politician Hussein Mjalli, and in 2013, a petition began to circulate in the Parliament of Jordan, as the overwhelming majority of MPs (110/120) alleged that he had finished his sentence and advocated his release. Nonetheless, Daqamseh served his sentence in full, being released on 12 March 2017. His family expressed pride for his actions and Daqamseh himself showed no signs of remorse, having told Jordanian interrogators in prison that he would have killed all of the girls had his M16 not jammed halfway through.

== Attack ==
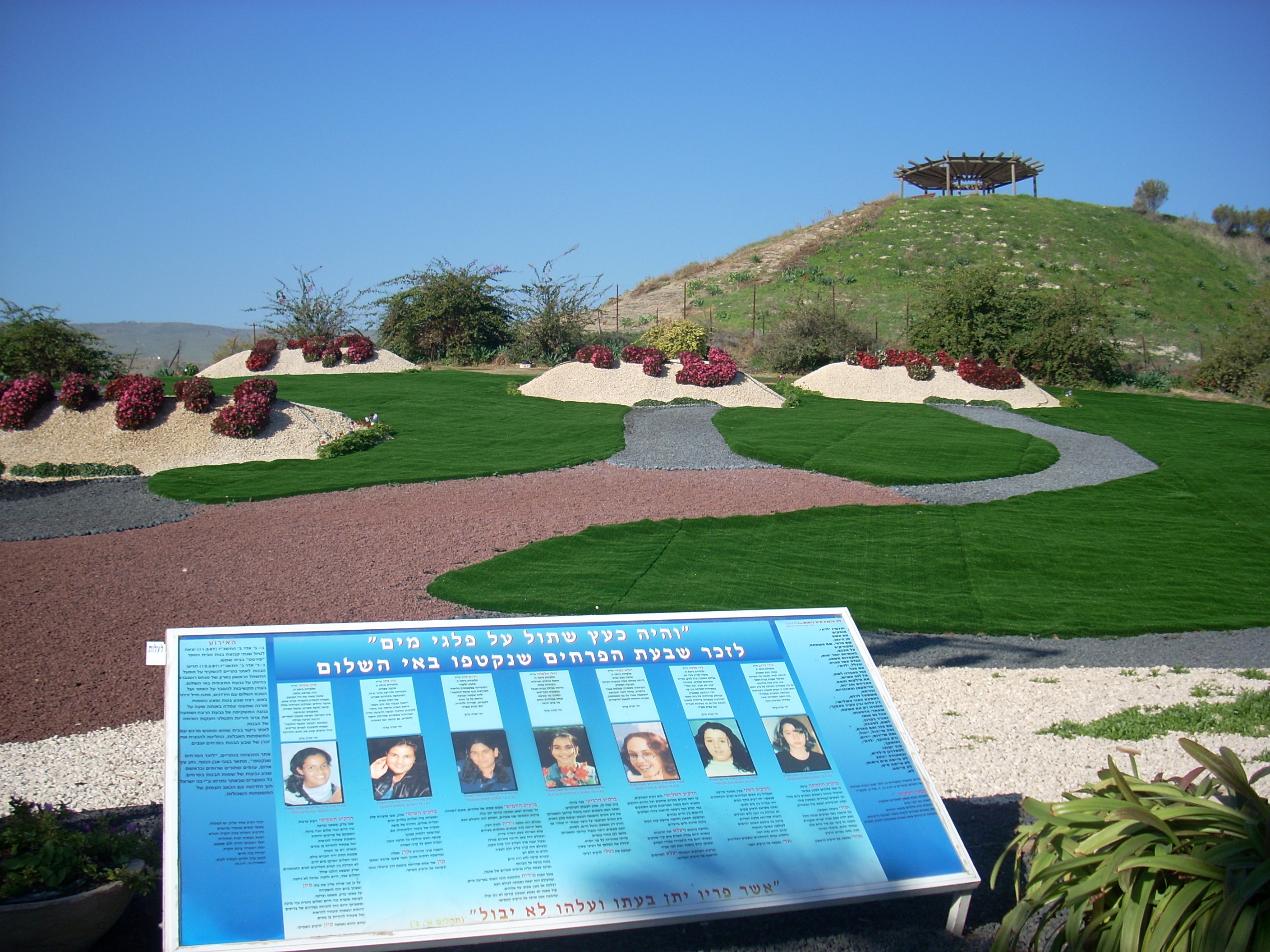
Memorial to the victims in Naharayim, Israel

On Thursday, March 13, 1997, 80 seventh- and eighth-grade schoolgirls from the Fuerst (Fürst) School of Beit Shemesh, west of Jerusalem, were on a field trip to the Jordan Valley and the Golan Heights. Part of the trip was to Naharayim, visiting the "Island of Peace", a joint Israeli-Jordanian tourist resort under Jordanian rule.

During the afternoon, the class reached the "Island of Peace" site and the girls got off the bus. As they were heading towards the observatory, a Jordanian soldier stationed at the site opened fire on the group with an M16 rifle.

The assailant killed seven schoolgirls and wounded five others and a teacher before his rifle jammed, and Jordanian soldiers rushed to help the victims after seizing him while yelling "Madman! Madman!".

=== Fatalities ===
- Sivan Fathi, 13, of Tzelafon
- Karen Cohen, 14, of Beit Shemesh
- Ya'ala Me'iri, 13, of Beit Shemesh
- Shiri Badayev, 14, of Beit Shemesh
- Natali Alkalai, 13, of Beit Shemesh
- Adi Malka, 13, of Beit Shemesh
- Nirit Cohen, 13, of Beit Shemesh

=== Memorial ===
The memorial site was founded by members of neighbouring kibbutz Ashdot Ya'akov. It shows 7 white small hills for every murdered girl with her name "written" by flowers. On a board a biblical quotation from Psalm 1:3 is written: "And he will be like a tree planted by the rivers of water, which brings forth his fruit in his season; his leaves will not wither."

== Assailant ==
The assailant was Jordanian Army Corporal Ahmed Daqamseh, who stated that he attacked because he was insulted and angered that the girls were whistling and clapping while he was praying.

Speaking on Al Jazeera in May 2001, Daqamseh's mother said, "I am proud of my son, and I hold my head high. My son did a heroic deed and has pleased God and his own conscience. My son lifts my head and the head of the entire Arab and Islamic nation. I am proud of any Muslim who does what Ahmad did. I hope that I am not saying something wrong. When my son went to prison, they asked him: 'Ahmad, do you regret it?' He answered: 'I have no regrets.' He treated everyone to coffee, honored all the other prisoners, and said: The only thing that I am angry about is the gun, which did not work properly. Otherwise I would have killed all of the passengers on the bus."

== Aftermath ==
The attack carried a resemblance to an incident where an Israeli Army clerk fired on a group of Palestinians in the Hebron vegetable market on 1 January 1997, wounding seven. He too was found to be mentally unstable by the Israeli authorities. Other media outlets drew parallels with the 1994 Cave of the Patriarchs massacre, where an Israeli Army reserve captain killed 29 and injured 125 in a Hebron mosque.

There were reports from Amman that hundreds of Jordanian soldiers had lined up to donate blood at the hospital where the girls were taken.

=== Jordanian reaction ===
After Daqamseh was captured, the Jordanian army officially announced that Daqamseh was mentally ill. A specialized medical team diagnosed him with antisocial personality disorder.

On March 16, 1997, a few days after the attack, King Hussein of Jordan personally apologized for the incident, traveling to Israel to visit and pay respects to the grieving families of the seven murdered girls during the traditional Jewish mourning ceremony known as shiva. King Hussein's visit to the parents of the victims was broadcast live in Israel and Jordan. During the visit, in which King Hussein stood alongside Israeli Prime Minister Benjamin Netanyahu, he expressed an apology on behalf of the Kingdom of Jordan telling the parents, "Your daughter is like my daughter. Your loss is my loss." He added that they were all "members of one family" and that the shooting was "a crime that is a shame for all of us... I feel as if I have lost a child of my own. If there is any purpose in life it will be to make sure that all the children no longer suffer the way our generation did."

Afterwards King Hussein also visited the wounded schoolgirls in the hospital, and offered to provide financial compensation to the families affected by the attack.

King Hussein's sincere act was an unusual act in the history of the Arab–Israeli conflict which deeply moved the mourning Israeli public and helped improve the relationship between the two countries after the attack. Nevertheless, various Jordanian individuals and groups criticized King Hussein's act for prostrating himself before Israel.

=== 1997: Daqamseh's trial and conviction ===
While the majority of Jordanians disapproved of the attacks and expressed sympathy for the victims, Daqamseh became a hero to some Jordanians who opposed normalization with Israel. Police prevented a pilgrimage to his house, and 200 Jordanian lawyers led by the Jordanian Bar Association competed to represent him.

In July 1997, a five-member Jordanian military tribunal found Daqamseh guilty of killing the Israeli schoolgirls and sentenced him to 20 years with hard labour in prison. He could have faced the death penalty but the tribunal spared him because he was determined to be mentally unstable.

=== 2011: Jordanian justice minister calls for Daqamseh's release ===
On February 14, 2011, Jordan's new justice minister Hussein Mjalli joined dozens of protesters in demanding the early release of Daqamseh. Mjalli, a long-time oppositionist, was appointed to the position as a result of the 2011 Jordanian protests, part of the larger Arab Spring against the region's established regimes.

Mjalli previously served as the defense lawyer of Daqamseh in his 1997 trial. As an Arab nationalist opposed to the 1994 Israel–Jordan peace treaty, Mjalli views Daqamseh as a hero who should not be in prison. The Israeli Foreign Ministry issued a statement saying that Mjalli's comments were received in Israel with "revulsion and shock." Israeli Embassy spokeswoman Merav Horsandi said it "is difficult for us to comprehend how there are people who support the release of a cold-blooded murderer of young children."

To allay Israeli concerns and anger regarding a possible early release, Jordan's foreign ministry issued a statement reassuring that Daqamseh would serve out his life sentence and that Mjalli had just expressed his personal opinion.

=== 2013: Parliament of Jordan calls for Daqamseh's release ===
In April 2013, 110 of 120 Jordanian Members of Parliament signed a petition calling for the release of Daqamseh. The petition called for a special pardon to release him. The cause of the petition is that Daqamseh allegedly finished his sentence.

The families of the seven murdered schoolgirls expressed outrage over the petition and vowed to do everything in their power to thwart Daqamseh's release. Nurit Fatihi, mother of Sivan Fatihi, said: "I expected [Daqamseh] to rot in jail, but I see I can’t count on the Jordanian court and authorities to promote justice. We’ve addressed government officials in the past, but it didn’t really help... Just like I will never see my daughter again, so too he does not deserve to see his family. Every one of the girls would have a family and children by now." On April 15, 2013, during Yom Hazikaron, the families of the victims held a memorial service in front of the Jordanian embassy in Ramat Gan. At the end of the ceremony, the Jordanian ambassador, Walid Khalid Obeidat, invited the parents into the embassy, and assured them that Daqamesh would not be released at the time.

=== 2017: Daqamseh is released from prison ===
On 12 March 2017, Daqamseh was released, after completing his prison term of 20 years.

"We respect the Jordanian judiciary, and now we can only remember the image of King Hussein consoling the families of the victims," commented Alice Wells, then American ambassador to Jordan, when asked about the embassy's opinion on Daqamseh's release.
