= Cold peace =

Public disgust of relative peace by at least one party

A cold peace is a state of relative peace between two countries that is marked by the enforcement of a peace treaty ending the state of war while the government or populace of at least one of the parties to the treaty continues to treat the treaty with vocal disgust domestically. The term “cold peace” was first introduced in late 1982 by Boutros Boutros-Ghali, who was then serving as a junior foreign minister and would later become UN Secretary-General. He used the phrase to refer to a situation in which peace existed in name, but efforts to deepen cooperation and foster connections between the two populations remained limited or intentionally restrained.

It is contrasted against a cold war in which at least two states are not openly pursuing a state of war against each other but openly or covertly support conflicts between each other's client states or allies. Cold peace, while marked by similar levels of mistrust and antagonistic domestic policy between the two governments and populations, do not result in proxy wars, formal incursions, or similar conflicts.

== Examples ==
=== Egypt and Israel ===
The Camp David Accords, the Egypt–Israel peace treaty and the aftermath of relations between Israel and Egypt are considered a modern example of cold peace. After having engaged each other in five prior wars, the populations had become weary of the loss of life, and the negotiation of the accords and the treaty were considered a high point of the Middle Eastern peace process. However, Egyptian popular support for the treaty plummeted after the 1981 assassination of Anwar Sadat and the 1982 Israeli invasion of Lebanon, and perception of the treaty has not recovered in the Egyptian populace ever since.

The drop in support for the treaty was not entirely reflected in Egyptian government policy, as from 1981 to his 2011 ouster, Anwar Sadat's successor, Hosni Mubarak continued to retain the treaty's terms but also played public sentiment against Israelis and Jews through state media. After Mubarak's ouster and the installation of a military junta in power until the inauguration of the next civilian government, protesters voiced strong opposition against the 1979 treaty with Israel and the Israeli response to Palestinian attacks on Israeli civilians and military personnel resulted in the withdrawal of the Egyptian ambassador over the deaths of five Egyptian security personnel in the Sinai, ostensibly by Palestinian militants or Israeli military personnel engaged in a retaliatory air raid on Gaza.

The lack of Egyptian support for the 1979 treaty is caused in part by pan-ethnic and religious fundamentalist sympathies in Egypt for Palestinians against Israel, a Jewish-majority state currently in conflict over the territory of Israel and Palestine, as well as by Egyptian nationalist sentiment against Israel dating back to before Israel's independence in 1948. Furthermore, most of the letter of both the accords and the treaty has been maintained, but the spirit of normalization that had been intended are perceived as not having been fulfilled.

=== Jordan and Israel ===
The Israel–Jordan peace treaty and the aftermath of relations between Israel and Jordan is another modern example of a cold peace. Just like the Egypt–Israel peace treaty, the Israel–Jordan peace treaty was closely linked to efforts to achieve peace between Israel and the Palestinians.

However with the election of Benjamin Netanyahu as Prime Minister of Israel in 1996, relations began to deteriorate.

On 27 September 1997 eight Mossad agents entered Jordan using fake Canadian passports and attempted to assassinate Jordanian citizen Khaled Mashal, head of the militant Islamist Palestinian group Hamas. King Hussein was preparing for a 30-year Hamas-Israel truce three days prior to the attempt, after Hamas had launched two attacks in Jerusalem. Two Mossad agents followed Mashal to his office and injected poison into his ears, but they were caught by Mashal's bodyguard. The two agents were then held by the Jordanian police, while the six other agents hid in the Israeli embassy. Furious, King Hussein met with an Israeli delegate who attempted to explain the situation; the King said in a speech about the incident that he felt that somebody "had spat in his face." Jordanian authorities requested Netanyahu to provide an antidote to save Mashal's life, but Netanyahu refused to do so. Jordan then threatened to storm the Israeli embassy and capture the rest of the Mossad team, but Israel argued that it would be against the Geneva Conventions. Jordan replied that the Geneva Conventions "do not apply to terrorists," and a special operations team headed by Hussein's son Abdullah was put in charge of the operation. King Hussein called American President Bill Clinton and requested his intervention, threatening to annul the treaty if Israel did not provide the antidote. Clinton later managed to get Israel's approval to reveal the name of the antidote, and complained about Netanyahu: "This man is impossible!" Khaled Mashal recovered, but Jordan's relations with Israel deteriorated and Israeli requests to contact King Hussein were rebuffed. The Mossad operatives were released by Jordan after Israel agreed to release 23 Jordanian and 50 Palestinian prisoners including Sheikh Ahmed Yassin.

All of these caused King Hussein a bitter disappointment, and his son and successor King Abdullah II described the relations between Jordan and Israel as a "cold peace". In an interview from 2010, King Abdullah II said that "Jordan-Israel relations have reached the lowest point since the peace treaty", and in another interview he described the relations as "a cold peace that keeps getting colder".

After the peace agreement between Israel and Jordan, Israel transferred a portion of the land area in Tzofar to Jordanian control, known as Al Ghamr, but Israel rented the land so that Israeli workers from the moshav could continue to cultivate it. The 25-year renewable lease would end in 2019. The Jordanian government announced its intention to end the lease. The treaty gives Jordan the right to do so only on one condition-that a one-year prior notice is given, which coincided with the announcement on 21 October 2018, by the King Abdullah II, who said that he does not intend to extend the lease. He added that after the expiry of the lease on 10 November 2019, Israeli farmers will be banned from entering the Al Ghamr enclave. During late April 2020 the land was handed back to Jordanian control.

In an interview with CNN in December 2022, after the inauguration of the new Israeli government, King Abdullah II warned Israel not to change the status of the Muslim and Christian holy sites and stated "If people [Israeli government] want to get into a conflict with us, we're quite prepared".

=== Iran and Iraq (1989–2003) ===
After the Iran-Iraq War, although Saddam Hussein's Iraq and the Islamic Republic of Iran had a truce, relations between the two countries were not normalized until the Ba'athist regime was overthrown by the Iraq War.

=== India and Pakistan ===
After numerous clashes over Kashmir, India and Pakistan maintained a long-term ceasefire and calm near the Line of Control, despite maintaining a minimum level of communication between the two sides.
