= Zofar =

Zofar may refer to the following:

- Tzofar, a village in southern Israel
- ZFR, VHF omnidirectional range on the J10 Airway in Israel
- Ẓófar in the Book of Job

== See also ==
- Zophar (disambiguation)
