= Munther Haddadin =

Jordanian politician

Dr. Munther Haddadin was born in Ma'in, Jordan. He became a government minister in 1997 and resigned in 1998. He was also a senior peace negotiator in the Israel-Jordan Peace Talks of 1994.

== Biography ==
Haddadin is an author of six books and many professional articles published in international journals, and is a Courtesy Professor at three American universities. He served the Hashemite Kingdom of Jordan as Minister of Water and Irrigation, Senior Peace Negotiator, chairman of the board and CEO of the Jordan Valley Authority, and was an institution builder in the Kingdom of Jordan between 1971 and 1998.

Haddadin was a member of the Jordanian delegations to the Middle East Peace Process. He was in charge of the files of water, energy and the environment in the bilateral negotiations conference, and was head of the Jordan delegation to the Water Resources Working Group of the multilateral conference. In the Trilateral Economic Committee chaired by the US with Jordan and Israel as members, Haddadin presented his own ideas on the integrated development of the Jordan Rift Valley including the Red Sea – Dead Sea linkage. He successfully negotiated the same in the bilateral conference and assigned a special article for it in the Peace Treaty. He was one of three Jordanians who worked with their Israeli counterparts after the Washington Declaration of July 1994 and their efforts culminated in the Peace Treaty between Jordan and Israel.

Haddadin earned his first degree in Civil Engineering from Alexandria University in Egypt, and his Master's and Ph.D. from the University of Washington in Seattle, Washington. He worked as a researcher in engineering designs in the United States and in founding the Royal Scientific Society in Jordan. Haddadin left his prints in the integrated development of the Jordan Valley for four years since 2016, he was selected a senator in the upper house of parliament. He served as chairman of the Board of Trustees of the Jordan University of Science and Technology in 2018 for four years, and as chairman and CEO of Abdali Group of companies in 2009. He has been decorated by King Hussein and by foreign heads of state, and by the Greek Orthodox Patriarch of Jerusalem.
