= Mjalli =

Mjalli is a surname. Notable people with the surname include:

- Hussein Mjalli (1937–2014), Jordanian politician and lawyer
- Yasmeen Mjalli (born 1996), American and Palestinian fashion designer and activist
