= Naharayim =

Disused works situated mainly in Jordan

Coordinates: 32°38′39.83″N 35°34′22.26″E

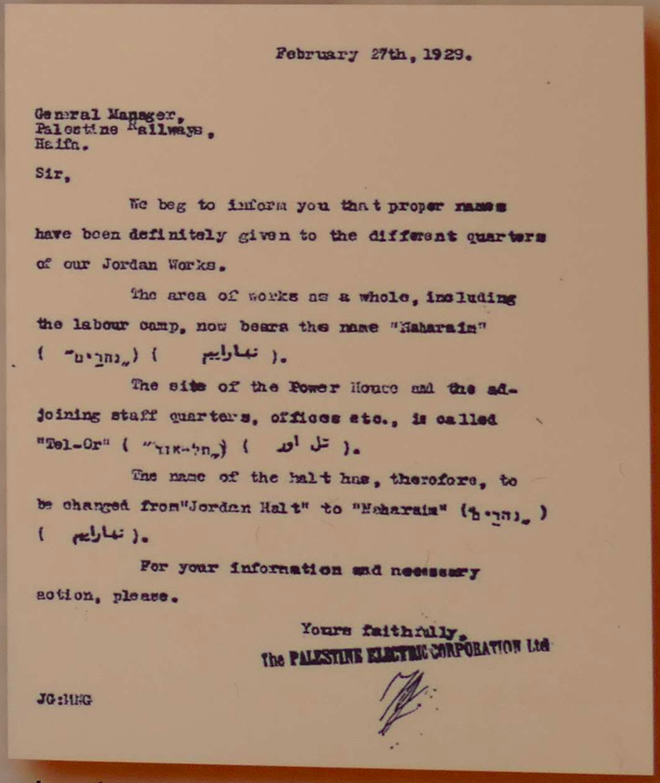
PEC letter naming Naharaim and Tel-Or.

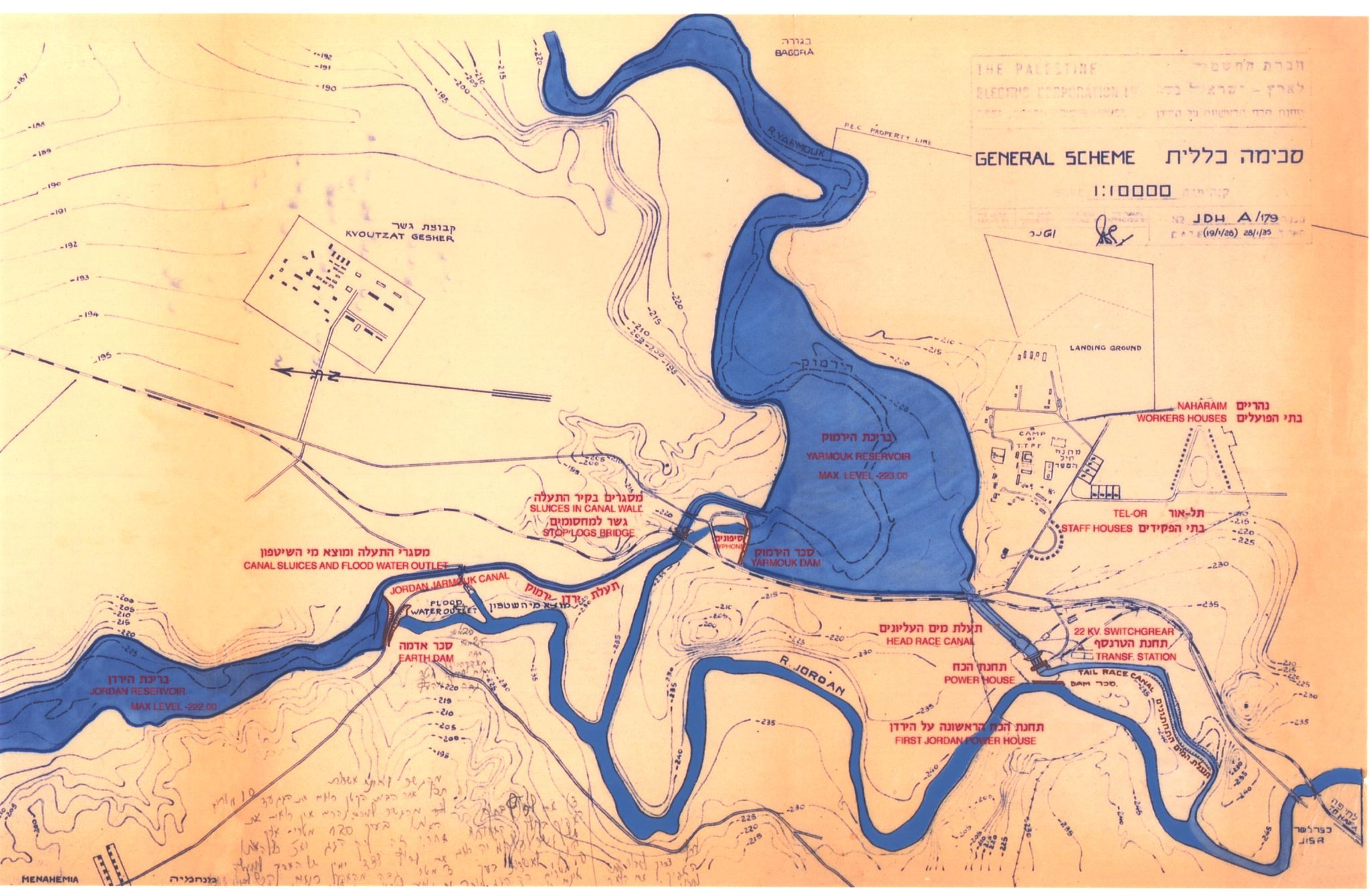
1935 Palestine Electric Corporation General Scheme for the area around the First Jordan Power House

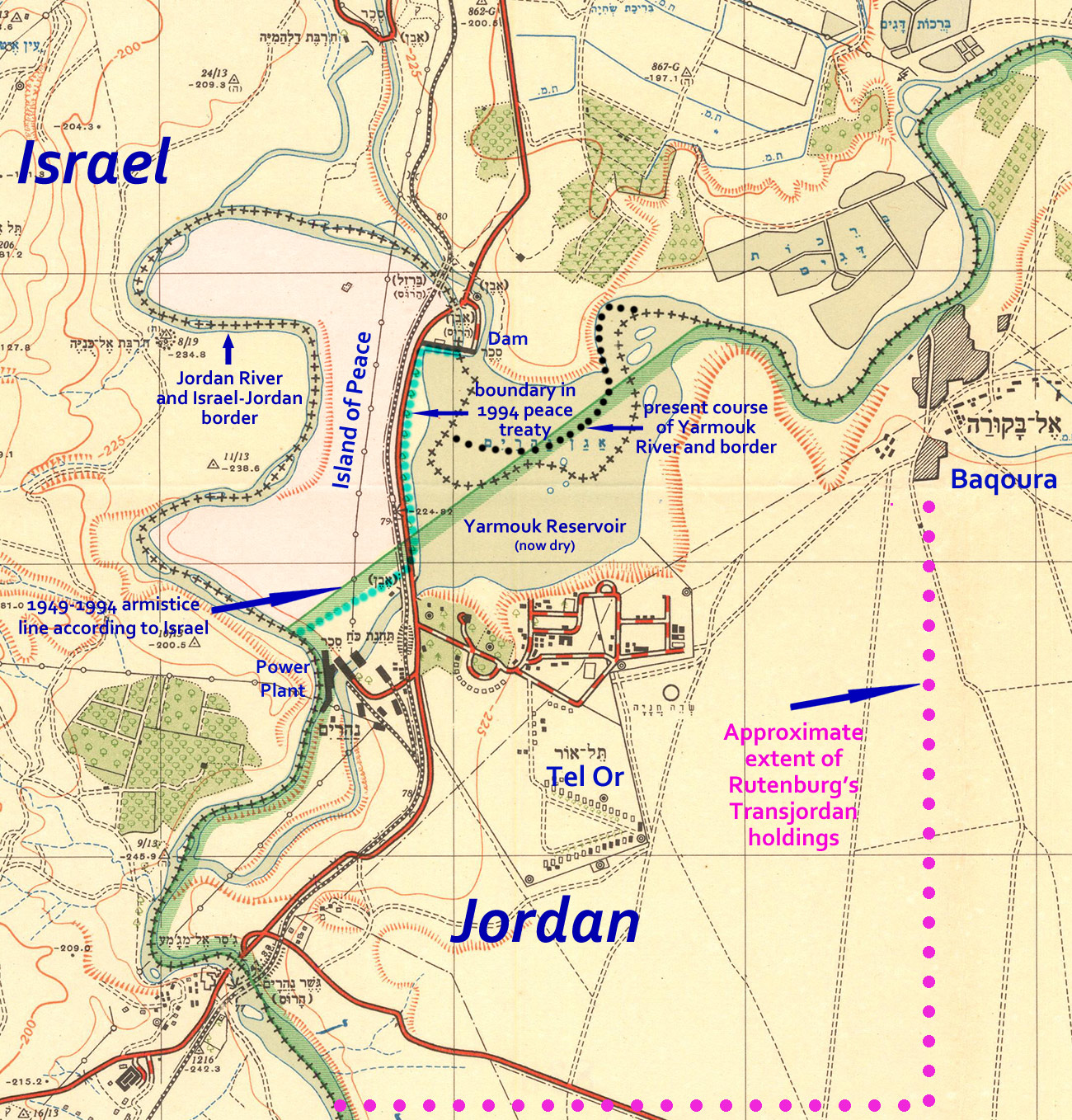
Nahariyim/Baqoura region in 1953 and now

Naharayim (Hebrew: נַהֲרַיִים; lit. 'Two Rivers'), historically the Jisr Majami area (Arabic: جسر المجامع; lit. 'Meeting Bridge area'), is the area where the Yarmouk River flows into the Jordan River. It was the site of the "First Jordan Hydro-Electric Power House", constructed between 1927–33, and located near an ancient Roman bridge known as Jisr Majami. The site was named by the Palestine Electric Company which assigned "proper names" to the "different quarters of our Jordan Works", one of these being the "works as a whole including the labour camp" to be called "Naharaim", and another being the site of the "Power House and the adjoining staff quarters, offices" to be called "Tel Or" (Hebrew: תל אור; lit. 'Hill of Light'). Most of the plant was situated in the Emirate of Transjordan and stretched from the northern canal near Kibbutz Ashdot Ya'akov in northern Mandatory Palestine to the Jisr el-Majami in the south.

The plant, now no longer in use, was built by Pinhas Rutenberg. It produced much of the energy consumed in Mandatory Palestine, until the 1948 Palestine war. The channels and dams built for the power plant, together with the two rivers, formed a man-made island. The residential area is known today as Qaryet Jisr Al-Majame (Arabic: قرية جسر المجامع - Community Bridge Village).

The 1994 Israel–Jordan peace treaty recognized part of the area – known as the Naharayim/Baqura Area in the treaty or, according to the map annexed to the treaty and authenticated by both Israel and Jordan, the Baqura/Naharayim area – to be under Jordanian sovereignty, but leased Israeli landowners freedom of entry. The 25-year renewable lease ended in 2019. The Jordanian government announced its intention to end the lease; the treaty gives Jordan the right to do so only on one condition – that one year prior notice is given, which coincided with the announcement in October 2018. Jordan reclaimed Al-Baqoura in November 2019 after a one-year notice of termination submitted by the Jordanian government.

== History ==
=== Jisr al Majami ===
Historically the only structure in the area was the Roman bridge of Jisr Majami. A railway bridge was built parallel to it in the early 20th century to carry the Jezreel Valley railway, opened in 1905. The bridge played a strategic role in World War I; it was taken by the 19th Lancers during the Capture of Afulah and Beisan. When the Rutenberg concession was given, it was defined as the area around Jisr Majami.

=== Hydroelectric power station ===
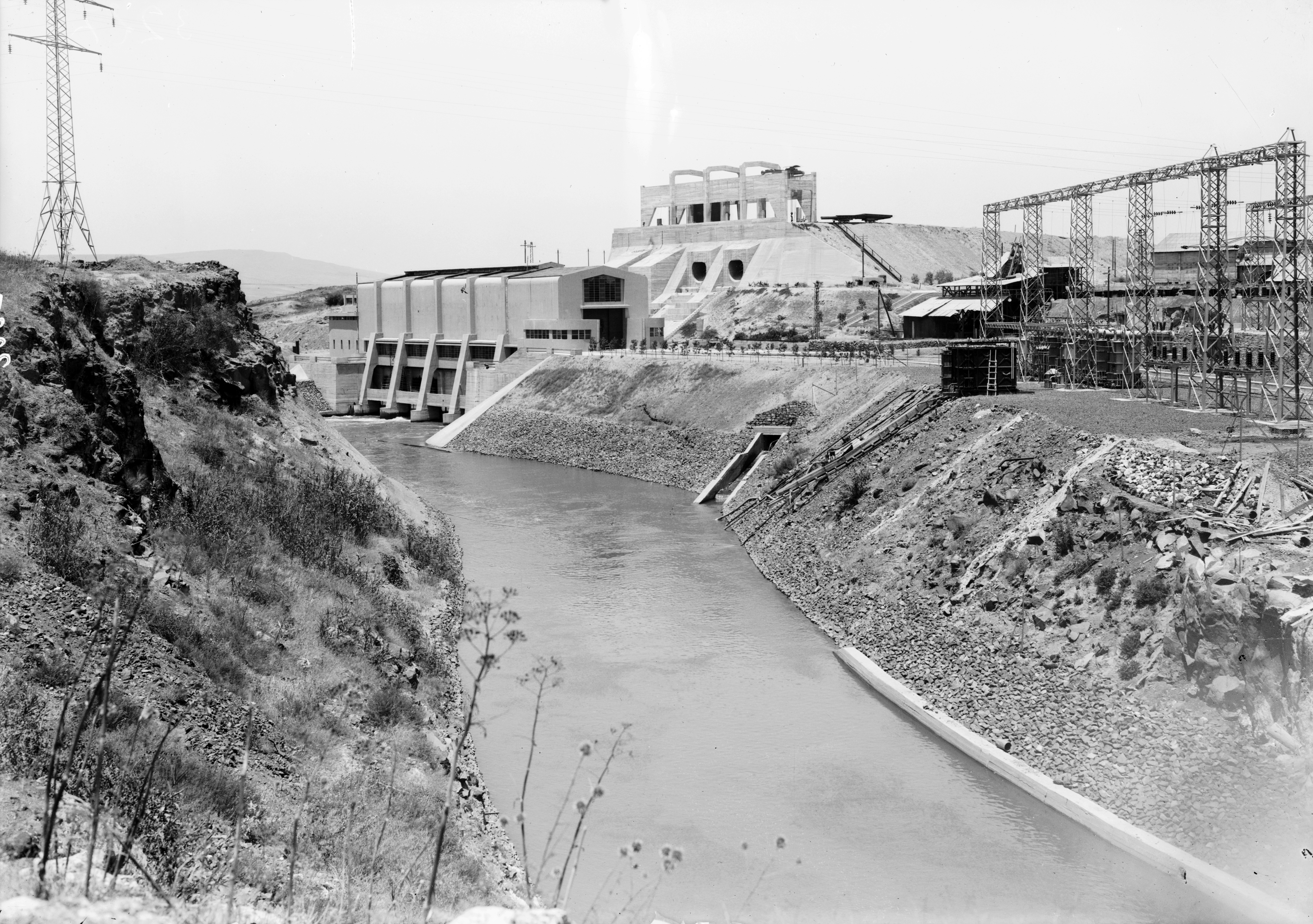
First Jordan Hydro-Electric Power House, circa 1933

Pinhas Rutenberg, a Russian-born Zionist and engineer immigrated to Palestine in 1919. After submitting a plan to the Zionist movement for the establishment of 13 hydroelectric power stations and securing financing for the plan, he was awarded a concession from the British Mandatory government to generate electricity, first from the Yarkon River near Tel Aviv, and shortly thereafter, utilizing all the running water in western Palestine.

Naharayim is part of 6,000 dunams (600 ha) sold to the Palestine Electric Corporation (PEC) run by Pinhas Rutenberg. The Naharayim site was chosen for the strong water flow and the possibility of regulating the flow through storage in the Sea of Galilee during the winter rainy season and release of the water reserves in the summer. Construction began in 1927 and continued for five years, providing employment for 3,000 workers. The site was named Naharayim, Hebrew for "Two Rivers."

=== Workers' village ===
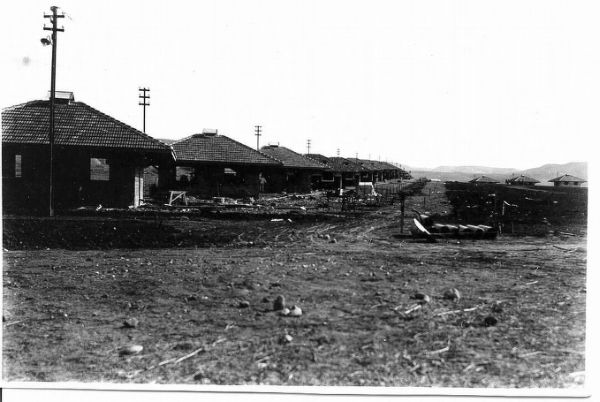
Homes in the workers village, 1932/1933

A residential neighborhood was built near the plant to house employees. It was the only Jewish village in Transjordan at the time. It was designated for residence of the permanent employees of the power plant and their families, aiming to create an agricultural village at the Eastern border of the Land of Israel.

Employees of the power station also farmed thousands of dunams of land and sold some of the produce at a company workers' supermarket in Haifa. Due to its relative isolation and despite the limited number of resident families, the village included a clinic, a kindergarten, and even a school, established by Yosef Hanani for the children of employees.

The families of the employees at Tel Or were evacuated from the settlement in April 1948, leaving behind only workers with Jordanian ID cards. Following a prolonged battle between Palestinian Jewish forces and the Transjordanian Arab Legion in the area, the remaining residents of Tel Or were given an ultimatum to surrender or leave the village. Tel Or was abandoned by the residents, who were evacuated to Jewish-controlled areas across the river.

During the 1948 War, 70 Palestinian Arab families from a village just meters away on the Palestinian side of the Jordan River populated the abandoned site.

=== 1947/8 diplomacy ===
In the lead up to the End of the British Mandate for Palestine and Israeli independence, Naharayim was the venue for a meeting between Golda Meir and King Abdullah on 17 November 1947. There was a second meeting in Amman on 10 May 1948, after the Gesher incident (see below), in an attempt by the Jewish leadership to head off Jordanian participation in the war.

=== 1948 war ===
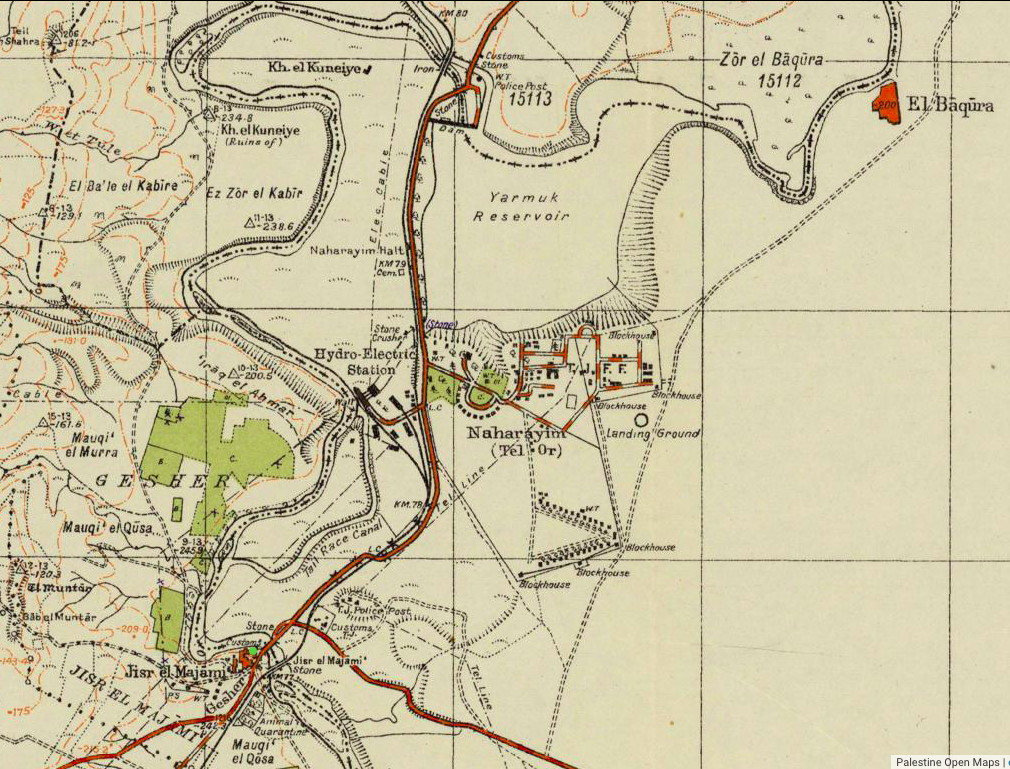
1940s Survey of Palestine map of the area

On 27 April 1948, in violation of a November 1947 agreement between Golda Meir and King Abdullah, the Arab Legion's 4th Battalion launched a mortar and artillery attack on the Naharayim police fort and Kibbutz Gesher (on the Palestinian side of the border). On the evening of 27 April, the Legion began shelling the fort and kibbutz, stepping up the attack the following day. Many of the kibbutz buildings were destroyed.

On the morning of April 29, a Legion officer demanded the evacuation of the fort, but was turned down. After protests to the British Mandate administration, the shelling was halted, and Abdullah was reprimanded for "aggression against Palestine territory." Although the attack did constitute a violation of the understanding, a British officer of the Legion claimed afterwards that it was an unfortunate local misunderstanding. The impetus for the attack was the seizure by the settlers of the police fortress which the British had invited Glubb Pasha to take over. The settlement would have fallen except that Abdullah told his son Talal to halt the attack. In the wake of the attack 50 children of the kibbutz were evacuated, first to the Ravitz Hotel on the Carmel, and then to a 19th-century French monastery on the grounds of Rambam Hospital in the Bat Galim neighborhood of Haifa, where they lived for the next 22 months. An Iraqi brigade invaded at Naharayim on May 15, 1948, in an unsuccessful attempt to take the kibbutz and fort. The power plant was occupied and looted by the Iraqi forces.

To prevent Iraqi tanks from attacking Jewish villages in the Jordan Valley, the sluice gates of the Degania dam were opened. The rush of water, which deepened the river at this spot, was instrumental in blocking the Iraqi-Jordanian incursion.

== 1949 armistice line ==
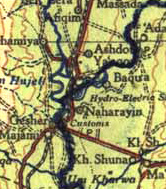
Armistice line as shown on the official map

Although the 1949 Israel-Jordan armistice agreement did not explicitly mention this region, the map attached to the agreement showed the armistice line cutting off a corner of Jordan between the two rivers (the present day Island of Peace). When Israel sent military forces into this corner in August 1950, Jordan filed a complaint with the United Nations Security Council. According to Jordan, the map had been improperly altered from the original agreed by the parties, was inadequately signed, and in any case the armistice agreement was never intended to alter the territory of Jordan. Israel responded that it was immaterial how the map came to be how it was, as only the final version was binding. The Security Council then questioned Ralph Bunche, who had been the UN mediator at the armistice negotiations at Rhodes. He said that the parties had brought map overlays to Rhodes from earlier informal negotiations and they were transferred manually onto a 1:250,000 map (shown right). He could not explain why a part of Jordan had been cut off and was sure it had not been brought up in the formal meetings. However, his opinion was that although the region remained sovereign Jordanian territory it was on the Israeli side of the armistice line because the map was an integral part of the agreement which both parties had signed.

== Peace treaty and property rights ==
The 1994 peace treaty included a photo-map of the area in its appendix

Two kibbutzim, Ashdot Ya'akov Meuhad and Ashdot Ya'akov Ihud, worked some 820 dunams (82 ha) on an island (present day Island of Peace) that was part of PEC land, which was in Israeli hands following the signing of the 1949 armistice agreement. The bulk of the 6,000 dunams, including the destroyed plant, remained in Jordanian hands and were placed under the Guardian of Enemy Property. In the 1994 Israel–Jordan peace treaty, Jordanian sovereignty over the 820 dunam area was confirmed, but Israelis retained private land ownership and special provisions allow free Israeli travel and protect Israeli property rights.

The Jordanian King Abdullah II said that as of Sunday, 10 November 2019, Israeli farmers will not be able to access the lands without a visa after the lease ended.

== Peace park ==
The remains of the power station are part of the Jordan River Peace Park south of the Island of Peace on the Israel-Jordan border. The project is spearheaded by the trilateral NGO EcoPeace Middle East, headquartered in Tel Aviv, Bethlehem and Amman.

== 1997 massacre ==
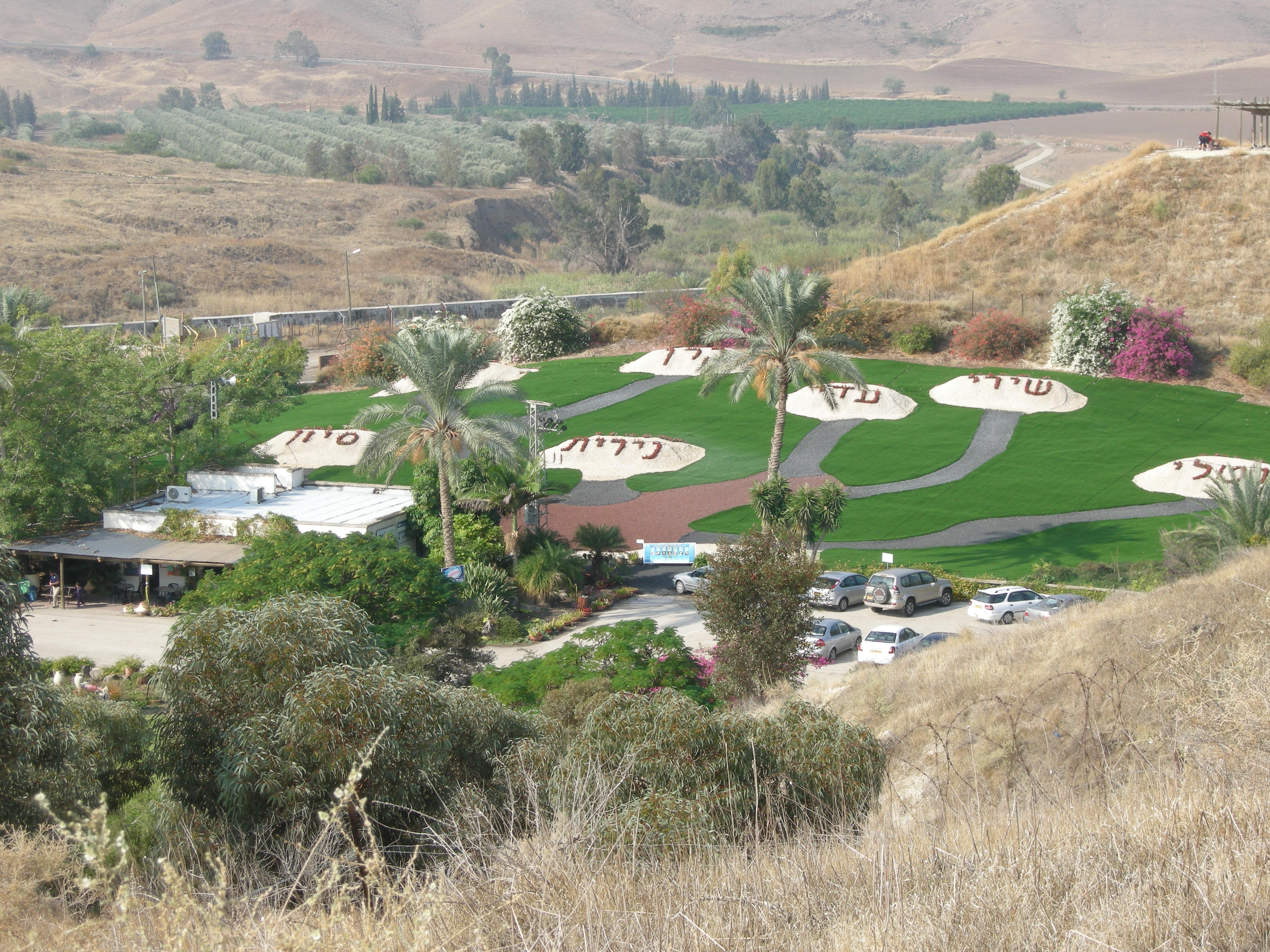
Naharayim Memorial to the victims of the Island of Peace massacre

On March 13, 1997, the AMIT Fuerst (Fürst) Zionist religious junior high school from Beit Shemesh was on a class trip to the Jordan Valley, and Island of Peace. Jordanian soldier Ahmed Daqamseh opened fire at the schoolchildren, killing seven girls aged 13 or 14 and badly wounding six others. King Hussein of Jordan came to Beit Shemesh to extend his condolences and ask forgiveness in the name of his country, a step which was seen as both touching and courageous. Daqamseh was tried by a Jordanian military tribunal, sentenced to twenty years in prison, and was released on 12 March 2017 after completing his sentence.

== See also ==
- Island of Peace
