= Zophar (disambiguation) =

Zophar may refer to:

- Tzofar, a moshav in southern Israel
- Zophar, a man mentioned in the Book of Job
- Zophar (Lunar series), a video game villain from the game Lunar: Eternal Blue
