= Ben-Gurion-Jabotinsky Agreements (London Agreements) =

The London Agreements (Hebrew: הסכמי לונדון) are a series of agreements signed between the Zionist Labor leader, David Ben-Gurion, and the leader of the Zionist Revisionist movement, Zeev Jabotinsky, on 26 October 1934 as part of an attempt to reconcile and bridge the gaps between the two movements in the early 1930s. The agreements were signed in London, England, and were mediated by Pinhas Rutenberg during 16 meetings that were held between Ben-Gurion and Jabotinsky over a period of a month. After years of severe violence and rivalry between the two movements in the Jewish community it was the high point of rapprochement between the two movements and their leaders in an attempt to heal the rift in the Zionist movement. In the winter of 1935, the agreement was rejected in a referendum carried out by the Labor Federation.
