= Ehvam - International Spiritual Center for Peace =

International Spiritual Center for Peace

- אֶוָום - מרכז רוחני בינלאומי לשלום
- Nickname: Arava Spiritual Center
- Formation: 2013; 13 years ago
- Founder: Dvora Tzvieli
- Type: Nonprofit
- Headquarters: Moa Oasis at Tzofar in the Arava Valley, Israel
- Methods: Yoga programs; Meditation; Spiritual retreats; Multicultural activities; Lecture events
- Founder & Spiritual Director: Dvora Tzvieli
- Website: ehvam.org

The Ehvam - International Spiritual Center for Peace (Hebrew: אֶוָום - מרכז רוחני בינלאומי לשלום) also known as the Arava Spiritual Center (Hebrew: מרכז רוחני ערבה), which is located in the southern Arava region in Israel, is a non-profit, non-governmental, and non-political organization founded in 2013 by Dvora Tzvieli. It is funded by donations through the "Shita Vechochma" (Hebrew: עמותת שיטה וחוכמה) (Method & Wisdom) NPO.

== History ==
The Ehvam - International Spiritual Center for Peace was established in 2013 by Dvora Tzvieli, known to her students as Lama Dvora-Hella, a student of Lama Sermey Rinpoche Geshe Lobsang Tarchin, whom she met in 1998. Tzvieli, a veteran of the Diamond Mountain Retreat Center in Phoenix Arizona where she spent 3 years in solitary retreat in the late 2000s, has devoted her life to the study, teaching and practice of Buddhism and traditions of the Far East.

=== Goal ===
The main focus in the establishment of the center was to act towards sustainable peace in the Middle East and thus contribute to World Peace.

=== The meaning of Ehvam ===
The name "Ehvam" is composed of two Sanskrit syllables (ཨེ་ཝཾ) and has a deep symbolic meaning in the Buddhist tradition. Amongst other things it conveys the ultimate enlightened state of complete freedom, purity, and wisdom. It also conveys the inseparability of a pure and peaceful world with peace and purity in the hearts of its inhabitants and the attainment of inner purity and peace which is ultimately reflected in the environment around us.

== Activities ==
The center facilitates study programs on the topic of Buddhism, Yoga and Meditation courses and workshops, workshops led by both local and guest speakers, retreats, joint activities between Israeli Jews, Arabs, Palestinians and people from around the world.

In 2019, the center hosted Lama Gyume Khensur Rinpoche Lobsang Jampa, a Lama globally-known for his Buddhist teachings. That same year, the center hosted world-renowned meditation researcher B. Alan Wallace.

On January 8, 2021, the center initiated a year-long silent retreat workshop which concluded in January 2022. During this silent retreat, participants were completely devoid of any communication with the outside world. This workshop is thought to be the first of its kind conducted in Israel.

In February 2023, the center hosted Thomas Hübl, a world-renowned spiritual teacher, author, and facilitator in the field of healing collective trauma, as part of the center's annual "One Heart" convention.

=== Activity during 2023 Israel–Hamas war ===
On the morning of October 7, 2023, following the unexpected missile attack by Hamas on Israel and the subsequent reports of a massacre in the southern region, members of the organization prepared to absorb around 100 Israeli residents and children from the Gaza perimeter.

== Controversy ==
A report published in Haaretz highlighted criticisms, made by at least ten past students and students' family members, of the unconventional methods endorsed in the center. Those include the unreserved loyalty demanded by Tzvieli, services students felt expected to provide to the teacher, such as feeding, cleaning, massage, and monetary donations, and a practice of boycotting students who decided to leave. Some students turned to the Israeli Center for Cult Victims after a period in the center. The report described an incident in which a student's marriage nearly terminated following an episode of "tantric relationship" with Tzvieli.
