= Pinhas Rutenberg =

Russian-Jewish engineer (1879–1942)

- Пётр Рутенберг
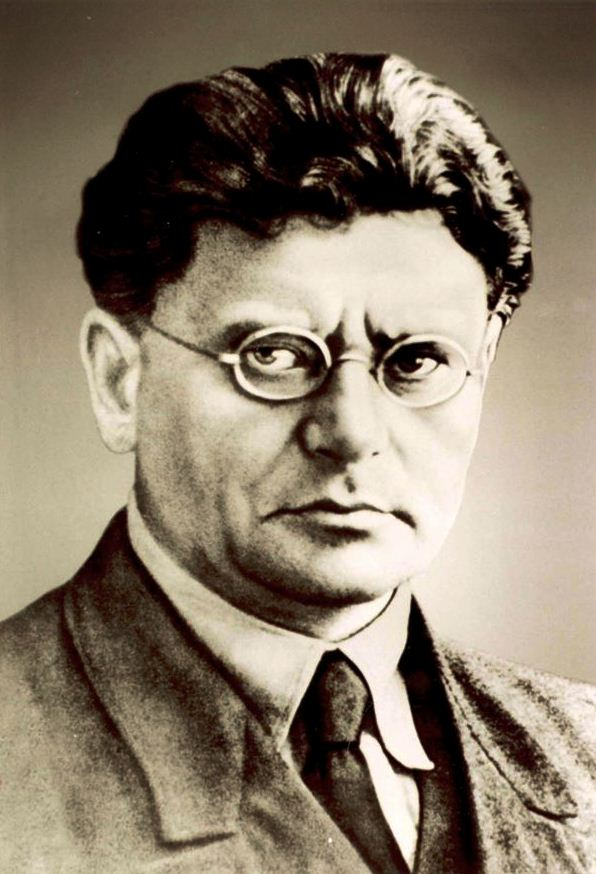
- Rutenberg, c. 1940
- Born: 5 February 1879; Romny, Russian Empire
- Died: 3 January 1942 (aged 62); Jerusalem, Mandatory Palestine

Pinhas Rutenberg (Russian: Пётр Моисеевич Рутенберг, romanized: Pyotr Moiseyevich Rutenberg; Hebrew: פנחס רוטנברג; 5 February 1879 – 3 January 1942) was a Russian-Jewish businessman, hydraulic engineer and political activist. In Russia, he was a member of the Socialist Revolutionary Party and fled due to the Bolshevik Revolution. During World War I, he was among the founders of the Jewish Legion and of the American Jewish Congress. Later, he immigrated to Mandatory Palestine and used his education and diplomacy to obtain a concession for production and distribution of electric power and founded the Palestine Electric Corporation in 1923, currently the Israel Electric Corporation. A vocal and committed Zionist, Rutenberg also participated in establishing the Haganah, and founded Palestine Airways. He subsequently served as a president of the Jewish National Council.

== Socialist and revolutionary ==
Pinhas Rutenberg was born in the town of Romny, north of the city of Poltava in the Russian Empire (present-day Ukraine), also the hometown of Haim Arlosoroff and three of the founders of the first kibbutz, Degania. After graduating from a practical high school, he enrolled to the Technology Institute in Saint Petersburg and joined the Socialist-Revolutionary Party (also known as the S.R. or Eser party). He worked as a workshop manager at the Putilov Plant, the largest Petersburg factory. The plant was a center of the Assembly of Russian Factory and Plant Workers, founded in 1903 by a popular working-class leader, Father George Gapon. Gapon collaborated in secret with the Police Department (the Okhrana), which believed this to be the way to control the workers' movement. Rutenberg became Gapon's friend, which made him a noticeable figure in the S.R. party.

For Sunday, 22 January [O.S. 9 January] 1905, Gapon organised a "peaceful workers' procession" to the Winter Palace in order to present a petition to the Emperor. Rutenberg participated, with his party's approval. In a tragic turn of events, army pickets fired directly into the crowd, and hundreds were killed. Amid the panic, Rutenberg retained self-control and actually saved Gapon's life, taking him away from gunfire. This incident, known as Bloody Sunday, sparked the Russian Revolution of 1905.

Gapon and Rutenberg fled abroad, being welcomed in Europe both by prominent Russian emigrants (such as Georgy Plekhanov and Vladimir Lenin), and by French socialist leaders (such as Jean Jaurès and Georges Clemenceau). Before the end of 1905, Rutenberg returned to Russia, and Gapon followed him.

Gapon soon revealed to Rutenberg his contacts with the police and tried to recruit him, too, reasoning that double loyalty was helpful to the workers' cause. However, Rutenberg betrayed his trust and reported this provocation to his party leaders, Yevno Azef and Boris Savinkov. Azef demanded that the traitor be put to death. Ironically, he was in fact an agent provocateur himself, exposed by Vladimir Burtsev in 1908.

On 26 March 1906, Gapon arrived to meet Rutenberg in a rented cottage outside Saint Petersburg, and after a month, Gapon was found there hanged. Rutenberg asserted later that Gapon was condemned by a comrades' court and that three S.R. party combatants overheard their conversation from the next room. After Gapon had repeated his collaboration proposal, Rutenberg called the comrades into the room and he left. When he returned, Gapon was dead.

However, the S.R. party leadership refused to assume responsibility, announcing that the execution was undertaken by Rutenberg individually and that the cause was a personal one, denying ever having sent their comrades to the meeting on 26 March. Rutenberg was then condemned and expelled from the party.

== Turn to Zionism ==
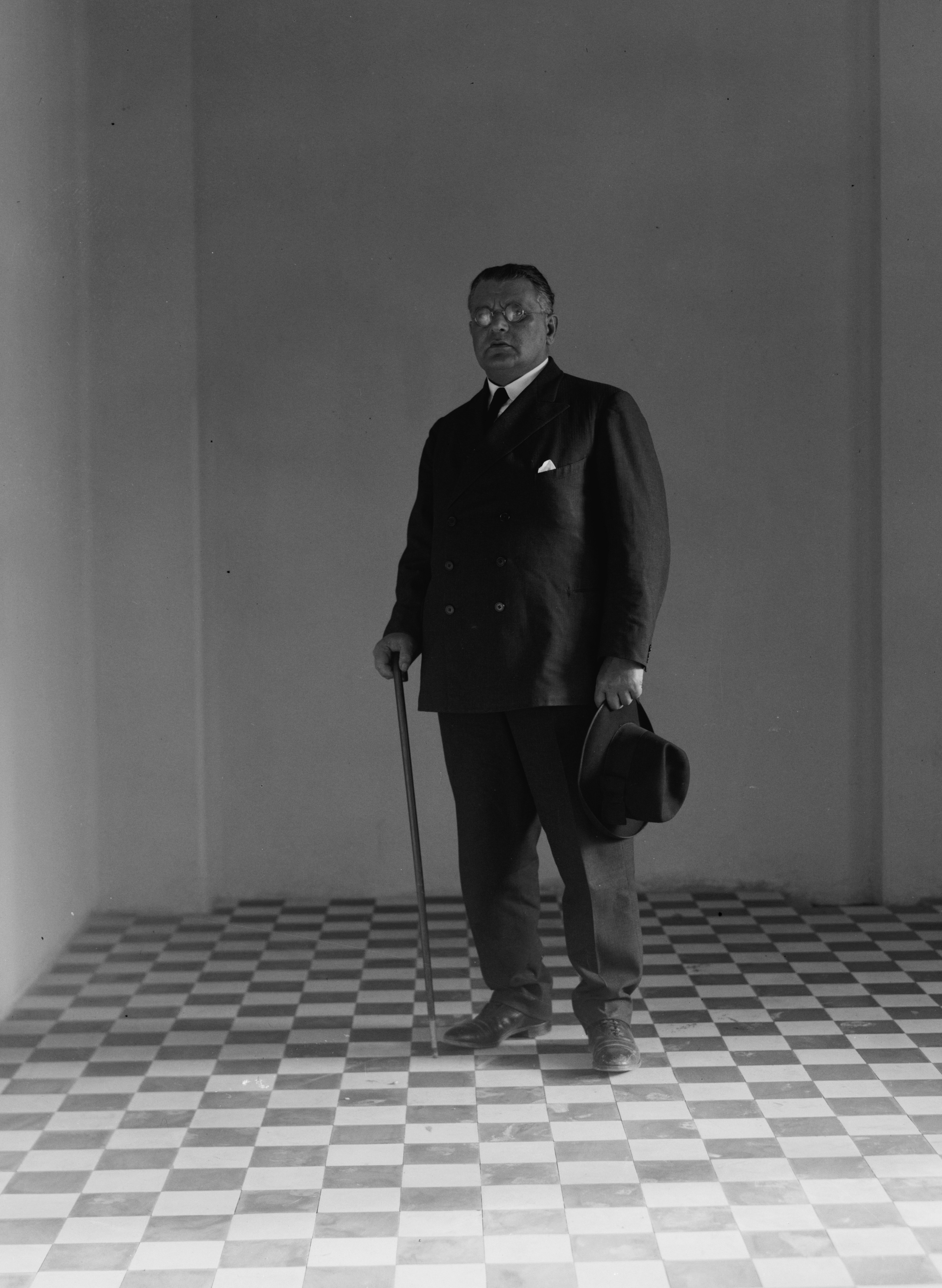
Pinhas Rutenberg c. 1940

Forced to emigrate, Rutenberg settled in Italy. Away from politics, he concentrated on hydraulic engineering. Pondering on specific Jews problems, he became convinced that the solution was to establish a national home for the Jewish people.

After World War I broke out, the Zionist movement mainly supported the Entente Powers. Rutenberg set the goal to create a Jewish armed force to fight for the Land of Israel. He visited European capitals, met prominent politicians and Zionist leaders, and finally joined the efforts of Zeev Jabotinsky and Joseph Trumpeldor to set up the Jewish Legion. In May 1915, on Jabotinsky's approval, Rutenberg travelled to the United States to promote this idea among the American Jewry.

He found strong support among Jewish organizations in New York City. Rutenberg endorsed the labour party (Poalei Zion) and cooperated with David Ben-Gurion, Itzhak Ben-Zvi, and Ber Borochov. Together with Chaim Zhitlowsky, he founded the American Jewish Congress. At the same time, Rutenberg published his book The National Revival of the Jewish People under the pseudonym Pinhas Ben-Ami (in Hebrew: my people's son).

While in the US, Rutenberg managed to complete a detailed design for utilizing the Land of Israel's hydraulic resources for irrigation and electrical power production, which was his long-time dream.

== Anti-Bolshevik ==
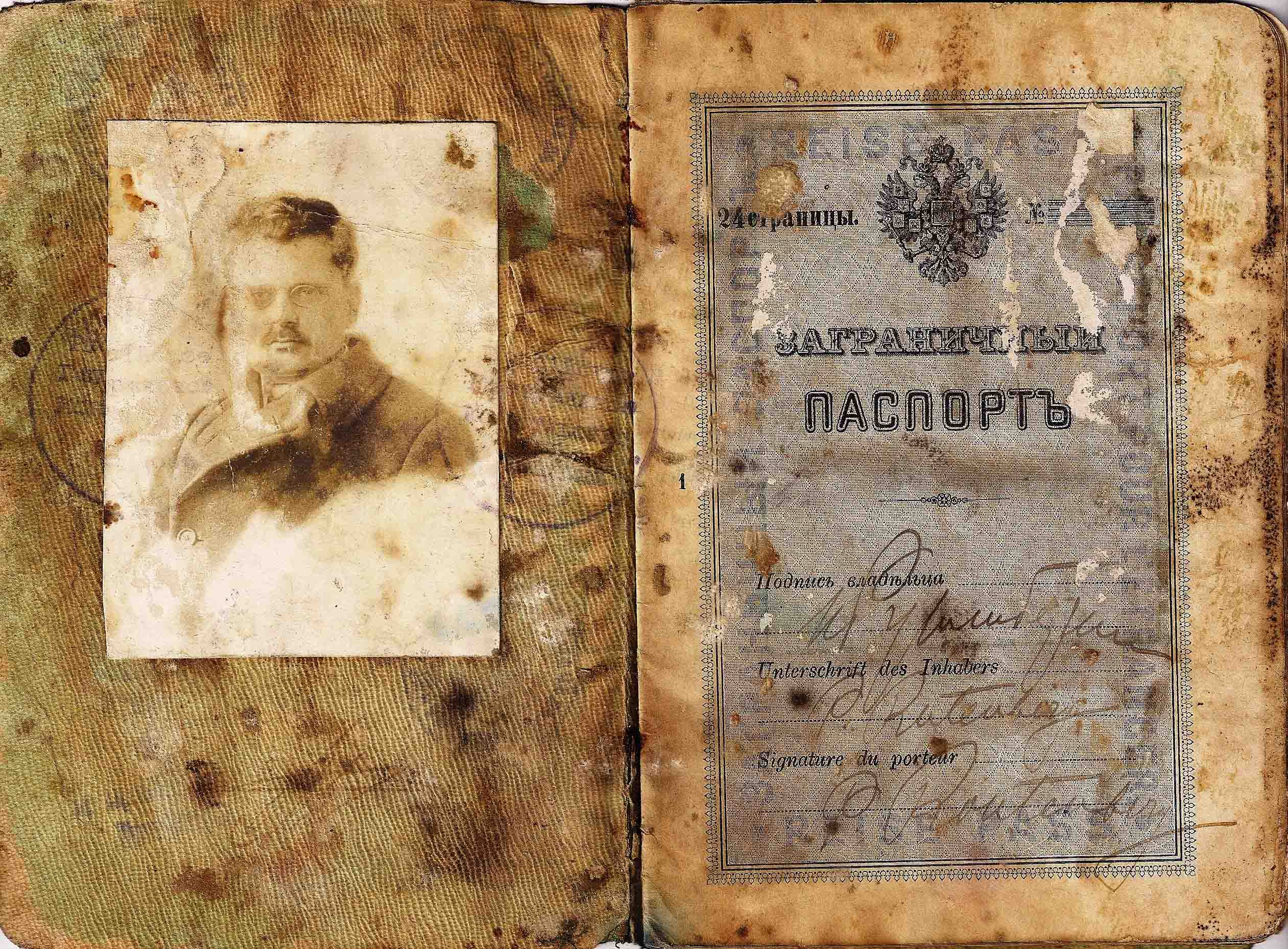
Passport used by Pinhas Rutenberg in 1919 to escape from Odessa

Rutenberg greeted the Russian February Revolution of 1917, and in July 1917, he returned to Petrograd, welcomed by the prime minister of the Russian Provisional Government, Alexander Kerensky, also an S.R. party member. Despite 12 years of absence in Russia, Rutenberg was soon named vice-president of the Petrograd municipality, the local Duma.

In a couple of months, Petrograd Soviet, headed by Leon Trotsky, became an alternative power in the capital, hostile towards the Duma. It was clear that the Soviets were planning to overthrow the government. On 3 November, Rutenberg became a member of the emergency Supreme Council, created by Kerensky to preserve order and justice. During an assault on the Winter Palace on 7 November, the night of the October Revolution, Rutenberg defended the government residence after Kerensky had escaped. When the Bolsheviks prevailed, he was arrested and put in jail, together with the "capitalist ministers".

In March 1918, when German troops approached Petrograd, the Bolsheviks released Rutenberg, among many others. He moved to Moscow, the new capital, and took a position in the cooperative movement. However, after the unsuccessful attempt upon Lenin's life by Fanny Kaplan in August 1918, the "Red Terror" campaign against "Esers" was launched. Rutenberg escaped from Moscow. His last location in Russia was in the port city of Odessa, where he was a member of the defense committee. The city was governed by White Russians who were supported by the French Army. On 17 March 1919, he managed to obtain a Russian passport and with an exit visa boarded an American vessel that took him to the Allied-controlled city of Constantinople. From there he sailed to Marseille, later going on to the United Kingdom before departing to British Mandate of Palestine.

== In Palestine ==
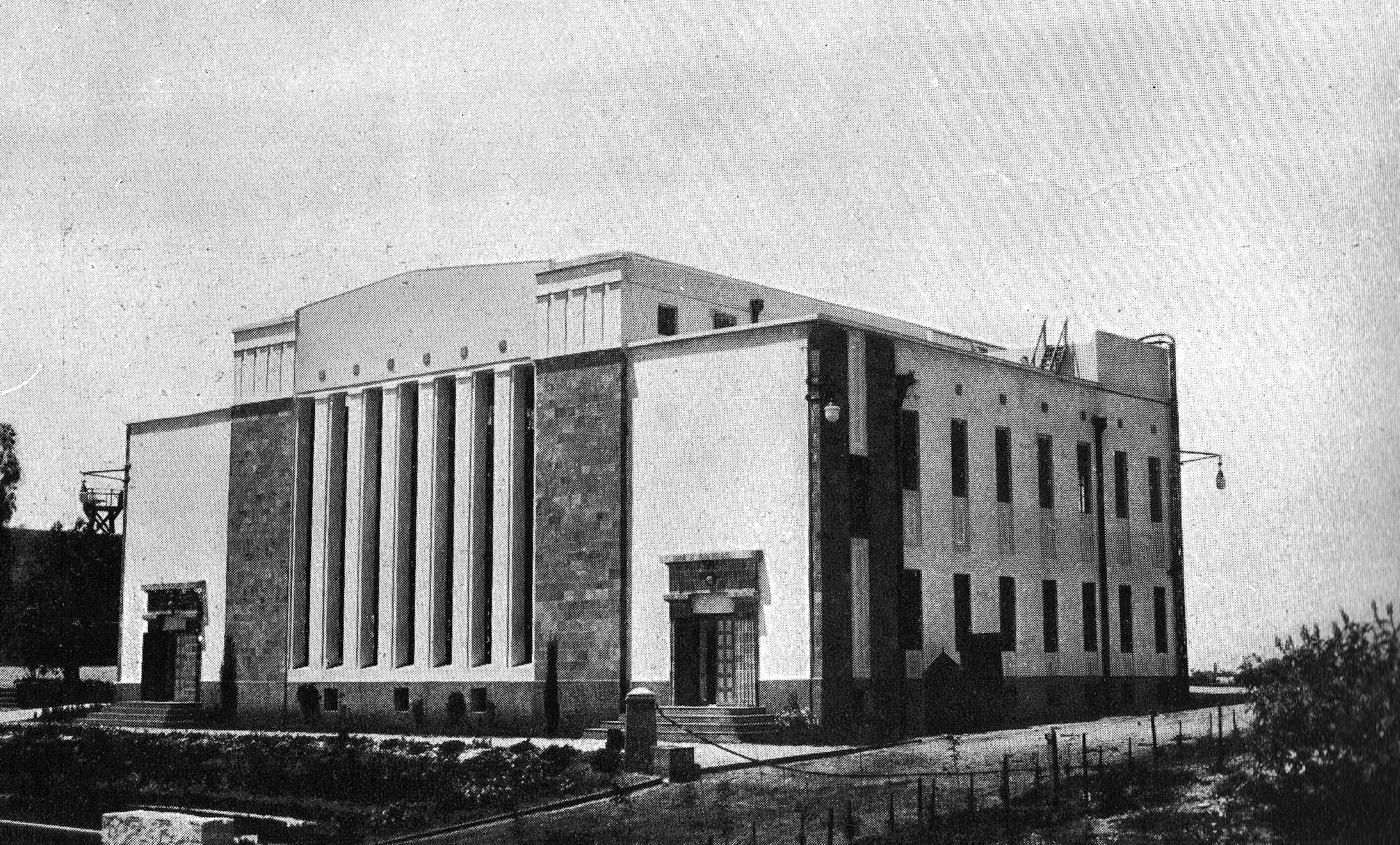
The first diesel-powered station in Tel Aviv, architect Joseph Berlin, built in 1923

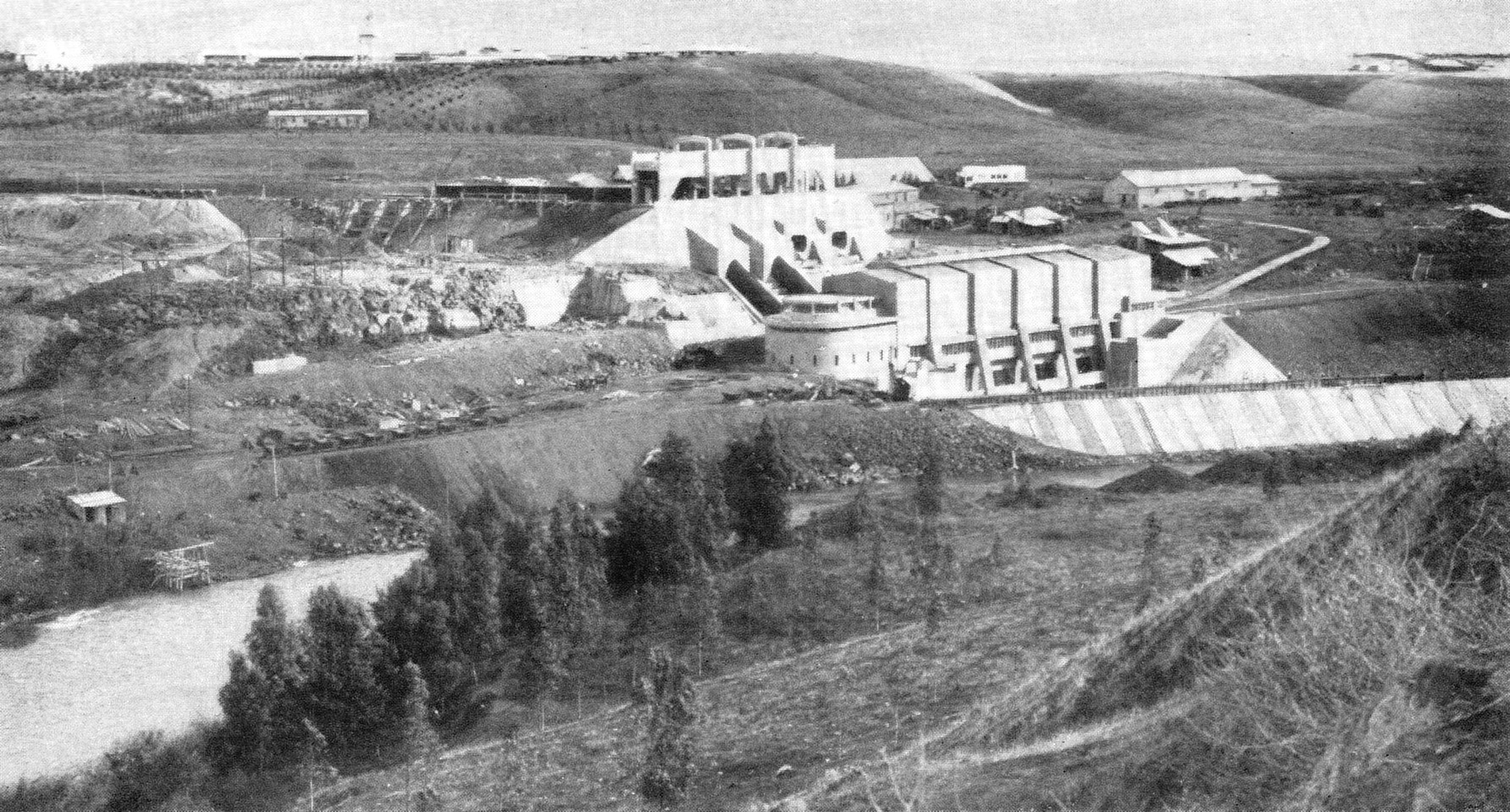
The Naharayim power station. 1935

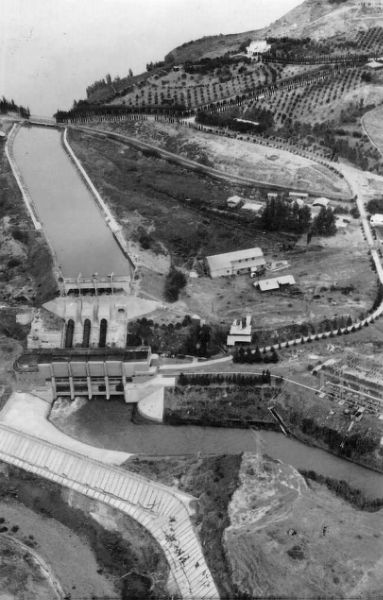
Naharayim. 1937

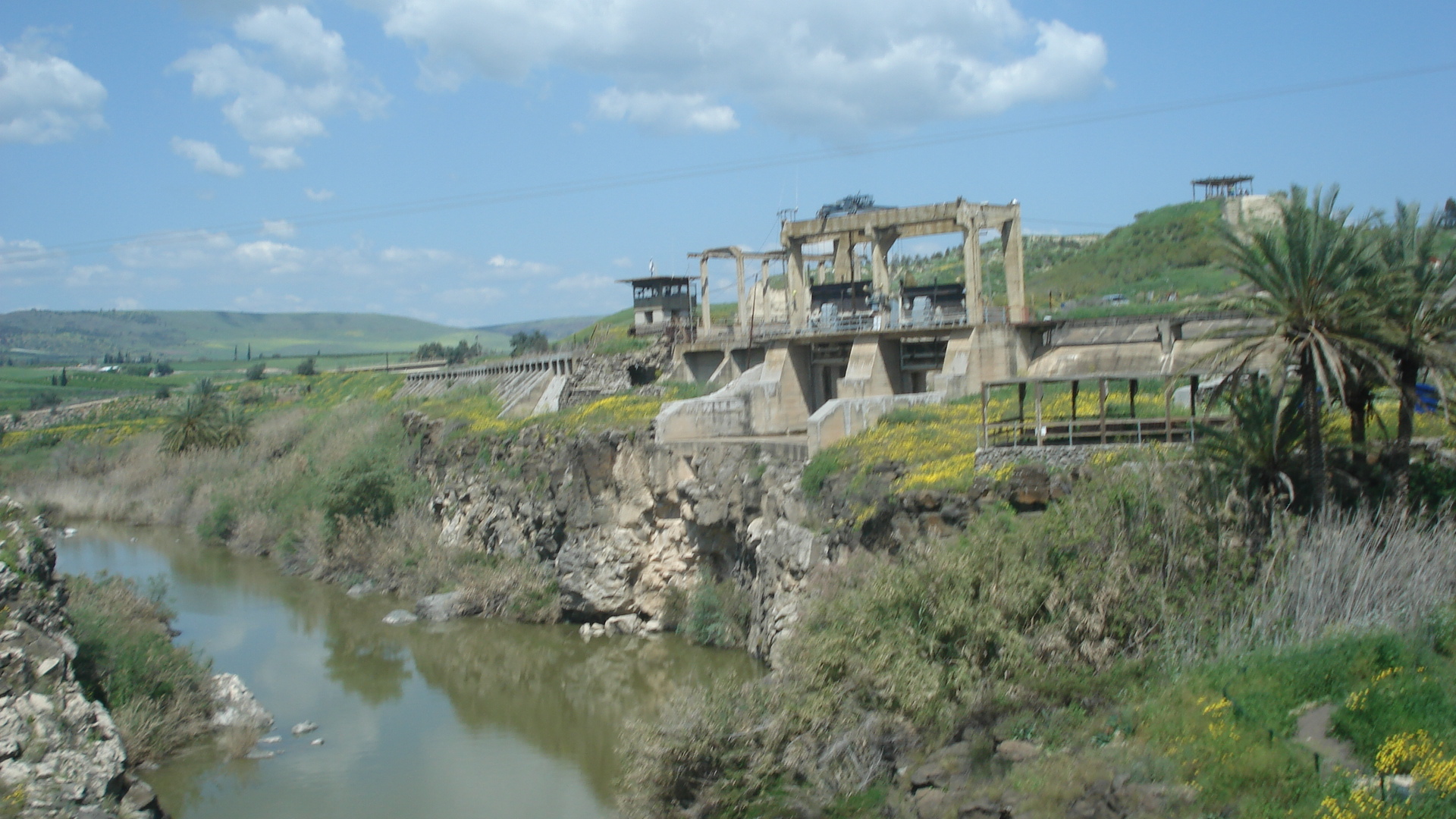
Ruins of the Naharayim power station. 2009

In 1919, Rutenberg appeared in Paris and joined other Zionist leaders, preparing propositions for the Treaty of Versailles. Promoting the electrification plan, he received financial support from Baron Edmond James de Rothschild and his son James A. de Rothschild and, finally, settled in Palestine to realise it.

However, his first contribution after arrival was establishing, together with Jabotinsky, the Jewish self-defense militia, the Haganah. Rutenberg was the chief officer of these troops in Tel Aviv during the Arab hostilities in 1921.

He participated in the demarcation of Mandatory Palestine's northern border, defining British and French areas of interest.

In 1921, over fierce Arab-Palestinian protests against giving the Yishuv an economic stranglehold of the country, the British granted Rutenberg the Jaffa and (later) the Jordan River electricity concessions. The Jaffa concession had been the first to have been executed. Operating under the name of the Jaffa Electric Company, Rutenberg in 1923 built a grid that gradually covered Jaffa, Tel Aviv, neighbouring (mainly Jewish) settlements, and the British military installations in Sarafend. The grid was powered by diesel engines, in contrast to the original commitment of Rutenberg to build a hydro-electric power station on the Auja (Yarkon) River. In 1923, Rutenberg founded the Palestine Electric Corporation. Following initial difficulties in launching the project, he sought and received support from then Colonial Secretary Winston Churchill. Rutenberg invited influential British politicians, such as Lord Herbert Samuel and Lord Reading, as well as Hugo Hirst, the Director of the General Electric Company, to be members of his Corporation Council.

The formidable achievement of Rutenberg was the "First Jordan Hydro-Electric Power House" at Naharayim on the Jordan River, which opened in 1930, and earned him the nickname "The Old Man of Naharayim". Other power plants were built in Tel Aviv, Haifa, and Tiberias, which supplied all of Palestine. Jerusalem was the only part of the Mandatory Palestine not supplied by Rutenberg's plants. The concession for Jerusalem was granted by the Ottoman Empire to Greek citizen Euripides Mavromatis. After Palestine was conquered by British forces, Mavromatis resisted Palestine Electric Company's attempts of building a power station that would serve Jerusalem. Only in 1942, when his British-Jerusalem Electric Corporation failed to supply the demands of the city, did the Mandatory government ask the Palestine Electric Company to take over the responsibility for supplying electricity to Jerusalem.

In October 1934, Rutenberg acted as mediator between David Ben-Gurion and Zeev Jabotinsky, during a series of meetings in London intended to reconcile the two, but the resulting London Agreements were short-lived.

On 17 September 1939, Rutenberg was elected for the second time as the president of the Jewish National Council. That same year Rutenberg moved into his new mansion on the Carmel overlooking Haifa. However, suffering from throat cancer he moved to Jerusalem in July 1941 to be nearer to Hadassah Hospital.

Rutenberg died in Jerusalem on 3 January 1942 at age 62. He left his house for the education of youth. The current resident at Beyt Rutenberg (Rutenberg House) is the Rutenberg Institute. A large modern power station near Ashkelon is named after him. Additionally, streets in Ramat Gan and Netanya are named in his honor.
