= Al Ghamr =

Area in Jordan

Coordinates: 30°32′25.2″N 35°14′29.0″E

Al Ghamr (Arabic: الغمر) is an area in Wadi Arabah, Aqaba Governorate, Jordan.

== History ==
The area was occupied by Israeli forces after the Six-Day War in 1967 and a Nahal settlement was founded in 1968 where Bildad Camp is now. In 1975, it was established as a moshav, to be known as Tzofar, by city residents and native moshavniks and moved several kilometers north to reach its modern site.

After the Israel–Jordan peace treaty of 1994, Israel transferred a portion of the area to Jordanian control but rented the land so that Israeli workers from the moshav could continue to cultivate it. The 25-year renewable lease lasted until 2019 and the Jordanian government announced the end of the lease. The treaty gives Jordan the right to do so on the condition that one years' notice is given, which coincided with the announcement in October 2018.

The enclave is next to Tzofar, which comprises 4,500 dunams, of which 1,500 dunams are cultivated as agricultural land, including greenhouses. In practice, it was a demilitarized zone that allowed the residents of Tzofar to do agricultural work from morning until nightfall.

In October 2019, Israeli officials said that King Abdullah II of Jordan agreed that Israeli farmers can continue working their crops in Al Ghamr enclave for another season. Jordan denied the Israeli officials' claim and said the decision to take the land was "final and decisive". Abdullah II said that as of November 10, 2019, Israeli farmers will be banned from entering Al Ghamr enclave.

During late April 2020, the land was handed back to Jordanian control.
