= Hussein Mjalli =

Jordanian politician and lawyer

Hussein Mujalli
- حسين محمد مجلي عبدالرحيم الرواشدة (أبو شُجاع) حسين مجلي

Member of the House of Representatives
- In office 1989–1993

Justice Minister
- In office 10 February 2011 – 26 May 2011
- Monarch: Abdullah II of Jordan
- Prime Minister: Marouf al-Bakhit
- Succeeded by: Ibrahim Omoush

Personal details
- Born: 1937 Kitta, Jerash Governorate, Jordan
- Died: 12 October 2014 (aged 77) Amman, Jordan

Hussein Mjalli (1937 – 12 October 2014) was a Jordanian politician and lawyer. He was a member of the House of Representatives from 1989 until 1993. He served as President of the Jordanian Bar Association for several terms. After the capture of Saddam Hussein in Iraq, he joined his defence team, while still President of the Jordanian Bar Association. In 2011 he joined the government of Prime Minister Marouf al-Bakhit as Minister of Justice. He resigned the same year.

== Career ==
Mjalli was made Chairman of the Jordanian Bar Association in 1970 and remained in office until 1975. He was President of the Arab Lawyers Bar from 1974 until 1984. He was the first Jordanian to join the International Bar Association, and was the first Arab member of the board of the association. He served as President of the Jordanian Bar Association for five terms. He resigned in 2008 when the Jordanian cabinet passed a draft law barring professional organisations from engaging in politics. He also served as lecturer at the Faculty of Law of the University of Jordan.

In 1989 he was elected to the House of Representatives. During his time in office he chaired the Legal Affairs Committee. In 1993 he left the House.

In April 1998 Mjalli voiced his displeasure about the ban on press coverage regarding the case of Leith Shubeilat, a former member of parliament and opposition figure, who was charged inciting an illegal demonstration. The case was pending before a state security court when the press ban was imposed. Mjalli made his comments in his capacities as the lawyer of Shubeilat and the President of the Jordanian Bar Association. Mjalli said that the ban had no legal grounds and should be disregarded. He called it an infringement on the public freedoms safeguarded by the constitution, which strengthened the governments suppression of the freedom of the press.

Mjalli was involved in the legal defence of Saddam Hussein in 2004. He had been appointed to a 20-member team by Hussein's wife Sajida Talfah. They argued that "given the invasion of Iraq [had] no legal basis, US-led occupation forces [had] no right to change or cancel the Iraqi constitution". Mjalli added that "Iraq, [the] Iraqi people, Iraqi law, and the Iraqi president were hijacked", concluding that "the occupation of Iraq was illegal so ipso facto everything that follows is illegal." Mjalli considered Saddam Hussein to still be the legitimate President of Iraq. Although the group had power of attorney they claimed they were prevented from seeing Hussein by the United States. In August 2005 the team of twenty lawyers was replaced by lawyer Khalil al-Duleimi.

In February 2011, Mjalli joined the government of Marouf al-Bakhit as Justice Minister. The cabinet had been appointed in response to the Jordanian protests. Mjalli was a member of the Ba'ath Party, an opposition party in Jordan, and seen as somewhat to the political left. One week after being appointed, Mjalli was embroiled in controversy when protesters assembled outside his office. The protesters demanded the early release of Ahmed Daqamseh, the perpetrator of the Island of Peace massacre. Mjalli joined the protesters, declaring he was participating in his capacity as Daqamseh's defence lawyer, which he had earlier been at the trial. He also declared Daqamseh a hero. The incident caused a disturbance in the relations between Israel and Jordan. Jordan's government dismissed Mjalli's comments as being his personal comments which did not represent the government's stance.

Mjalli resigned on 26 May 2011 when Khaled Shahin, a businessman who had been convicted of bribery, was released to receive medical treatment abroad. Ibrahim Omoush replaced Mjalli.

Mjalli died of a heart attack on 12 October 2014, aged 77, and was buried in his hometown of Kitta in Jerash Governorate.
