= Island of Peace =

Area in Northern Jordan

- Al-Baqoura
- الباقورة נַהֲרַיִים
- Interactive map of Island of Peace
- Type: Park
- Location: Northern Jordan, at the confluence of the Jordan River and Yarmouk River
- Coordinates: 32°38′26″N 35°34′0″E
- Established: 1994 (Israel–Jordan Treaty of Peace)
- Operator: Jordanian government
- Status: Under full Jordanian control since November 2019

The Island of Peace, or Al-Baqoura as it is known in Jordan, is an area in northern Jordan bordering the Jordan River. The park is at the confluence of the Jordan River and Yarmouk River. Pinhas Rutenberg's First Jordan Hydro-Electric Power House can be seen from here.

The 1994 Israel–Jordan peace treaty recognized the area to be under Jordanian sovereignty but leased Israeli landowners freedom of entry. The 25-year renewable lease ended in 2019. The treaty gives Jordan the right to end the lease on one condition—that a one-year prior notice is given, which the Jordanian government did, by an announcement made in October 2018.

On 10 November 2019, Jordan reclaimed full control of the area, with King Abdullah II stating that Jordan was asserting "full sovereignty over every inch of those lands".

== History ==
=== British Mandate: the power plant ===
Land along the Jordan River's alluvial slopes and floor bed was under Jewish ownership before the establishment of the State of Israel. In 1927, Pinchas Rutenberg, founder of the Palestine Electric Company, signed an agreement with King Abdullah I of Jordan to build a hydroelectric power station. The channels and dams built for this purpose, together with the two rivers, created a man-made island. The plant began supplying electricity in 1932. Operations were shut down in the wake of the 1948 Arab-Israeli War.

=== 1994 Israel-Jordan peace treaty ===
In 1994, Israel ceded the area to Jordan as part of the Israel-Jordan Treaty of Peace. Jordan agreed to lease it back so the Israeli farmers from Kibbutz Ashdot Ya'akov could continue to cultivate the land.

=== 1994-2019 arrangements ===
Farming continued under a 25-year, automatically renewable lease. A gate was established to enable Israeli tourists to visit the park without a visa or passport, on presentation of their identity cards to the Jordanian guards at the border crossing. As of 2012, tourists could only enter in a group with an authorised guide. Tourism researchers Alon Gelbman and Darya Maoz published an analysis of the stories told by the guides to Israeli tourists.

=== 2019 arrangements ===
In 2019 Jordan took full control over the area leased to Israeli farmers in 1994.

== 1997 massacre ==
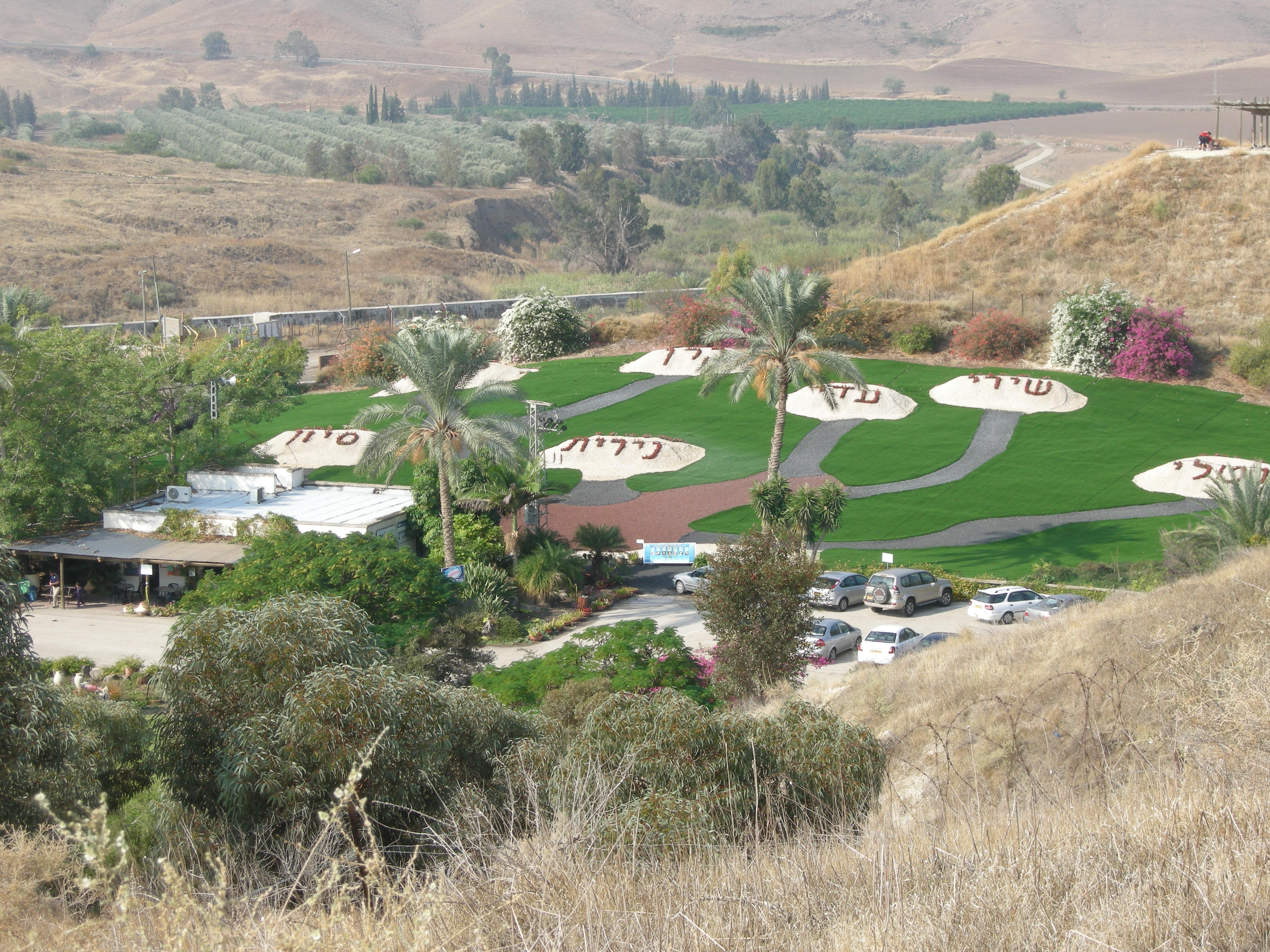
Naharayim Memorial

On March 13, 1997, the AMIT Fuerst (Fürst) Jewish Zionist religious junior high school from Beit Shemesh was on a class trip to the Jordan Valley, and Island of Peace. Jordanian soldier Ahmed Daqamseh opened fire at the schoolchildren, killing seven girls aged 13 or 14 and badly wounding six others. He later claimed he would have murdered many more had his weapon not jammed. In 2013, a petition calling for a special pardon circulated in the Parliament of Jordan garnered overwhelming support of MPs (110/120).

King Hussein of Jordan came to Beit Shemesh to extend his condolences and ask forgiveness in the name of his country.
