= Tzofar =

Place in Southern Israel

Tzofar: צופר (Hebrew)
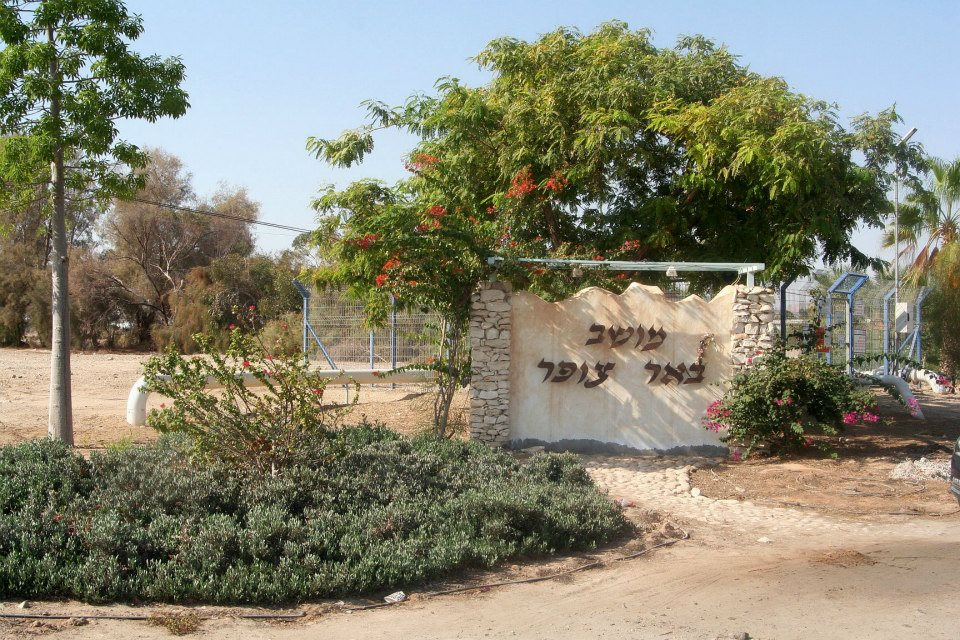

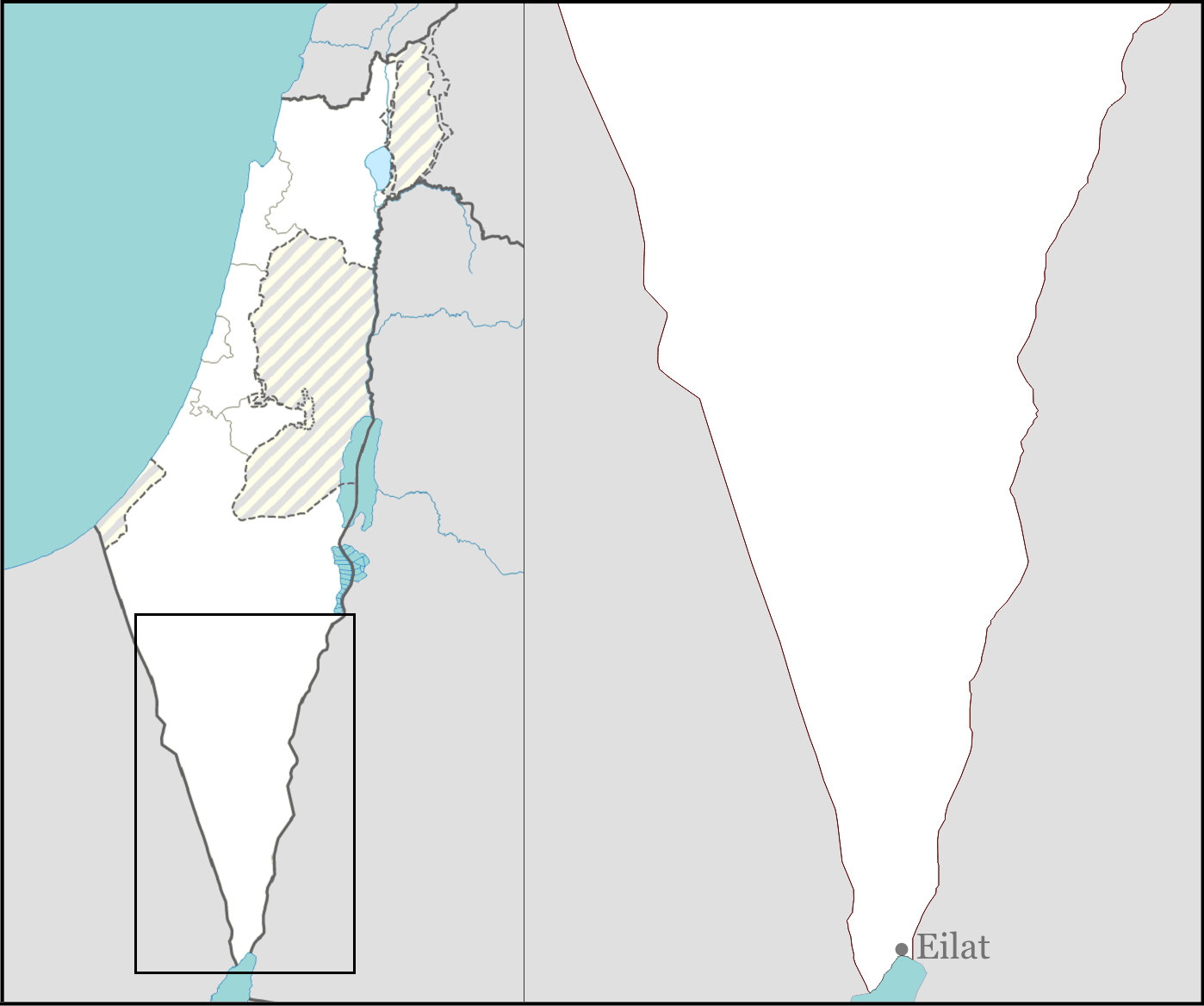
- Location within Southern Negev region of Israel Location within Israel
- Coordinates: 30°33′38″N 35°10′53″E
- Country: Israel
- District: Southern
- Subdistrict: Beersheba
- Council: Central Arava
- Affiliation: Moshavim movement
- Founded: 1970
- Founder: Former Nahal soldiers
- Population (2024): 891
- Website: www.zofar.org.il

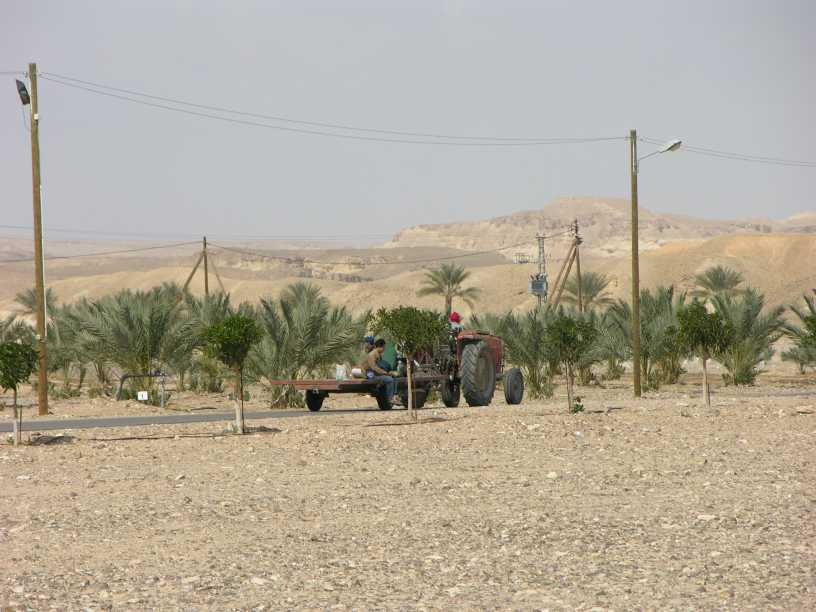
Agriculture in Tzofar

Tzofar (Hebrew: צופר) is a moshav in southern Israel. Located in the Arava valley, it falls under the jurisdiction of the Central Arava Regional Council. In 2024 it had a population of 891.

== Etymology ==
The name derives from the nearby Tzofar stream, and is also referring to one of the "friends" of Job (f.e. Job 2:11). In the Negev there are also kibbutzim with the names of the two other "friends"; nearby former Mahane Bildad, since 2001 named Tzukim, and Elifaz in the southern Arava.

== History ==
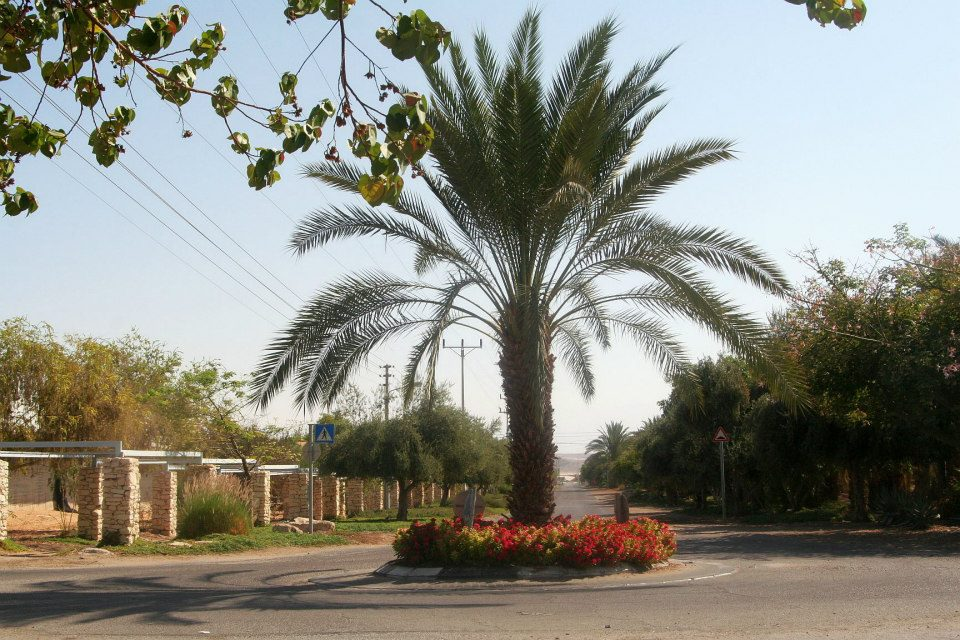
Street in Tzofar

The settlement was founded as a Nahal settlement in 1968 where Bildad Camp is currently located. In 1975 it was established as a moshav by city residents and native moshavniks and relocated several kilometers north to reach is present-day location.

After the peace agreement between Israel and Jordan, Israel transferred a portion of the land area in Tzofar to Jordanian control, known as Al Ghamr, but Israel rented the land so that Israeli workers from the moshav could continue to cultivate it. The 25-year renewable lease would end in 2019. The Jordanian government announced its intention to end the lease. The treaty gives Jordan the right to do so only on one condition-that a one-year prior notice is given, which coincided with the announcement in October 2018.

In October 2019, Israeli officials said that King Abdullah II of Jordan agreed that Israeli farmers can continue working their crops in the Al Ghamr enclave for another season. Jordan denied the Israeli officials' claim and said the decision to take the land was "final and decisive."

The Jordanian King Abdullah II said that as of 10 November 2019, Israeli farmers will be banned from entering Al Ghamr enclave.

== Economy ==
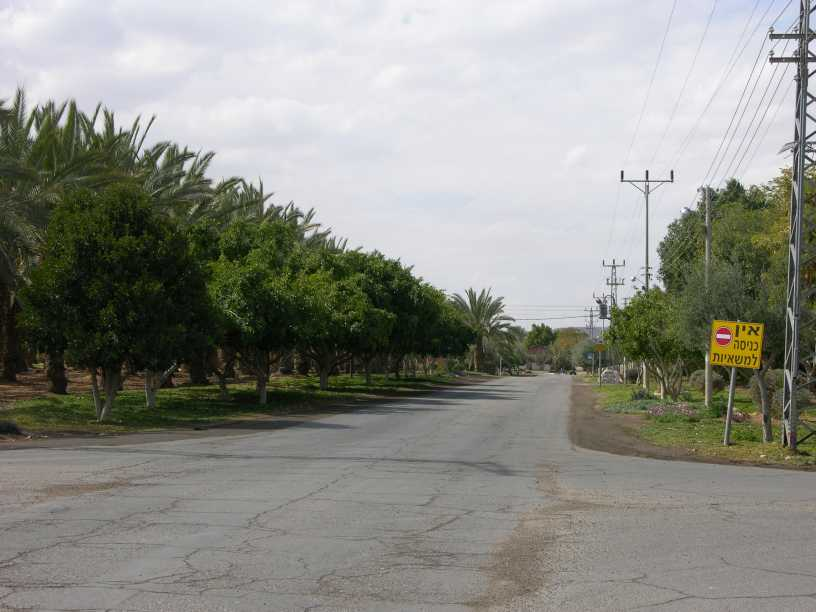
Tzofar trees

Winter farming is the main industry of the moshav. The produce is intended mainly for export, while some of it is sold locally. Vegetables grown in the moshav include melons, peppers, and tomatoes.

An attempt has been made to farm lobster in artificial ponds. Pens for cattle have been constructed to serve as a holding place for cattle being imported into Israel. The moshav also contains a grove of palm trees jointly owned by all the inhabitants.

A secondary source of income is tourism, based on the proximity of Tzofar to the ancient Nabataean spice route and ancient Nabataean city of Moa.

=== Arava Spiritual Center ===
Within the jurisdiction of the moshav is the "Ehvam - International Spiritual Center for Peace", also known as the "Arava Spiritual Center", which was founded in 2007.
