= Israel–Jordan peace treaty =

1994 agreement between the State of Israel and the Hashemite Kingdom of Jordan

Israel–Jordan Peace Treaty
Treaty of Peace Between the State of Israel and the Hashemite Kingdom of Jordan
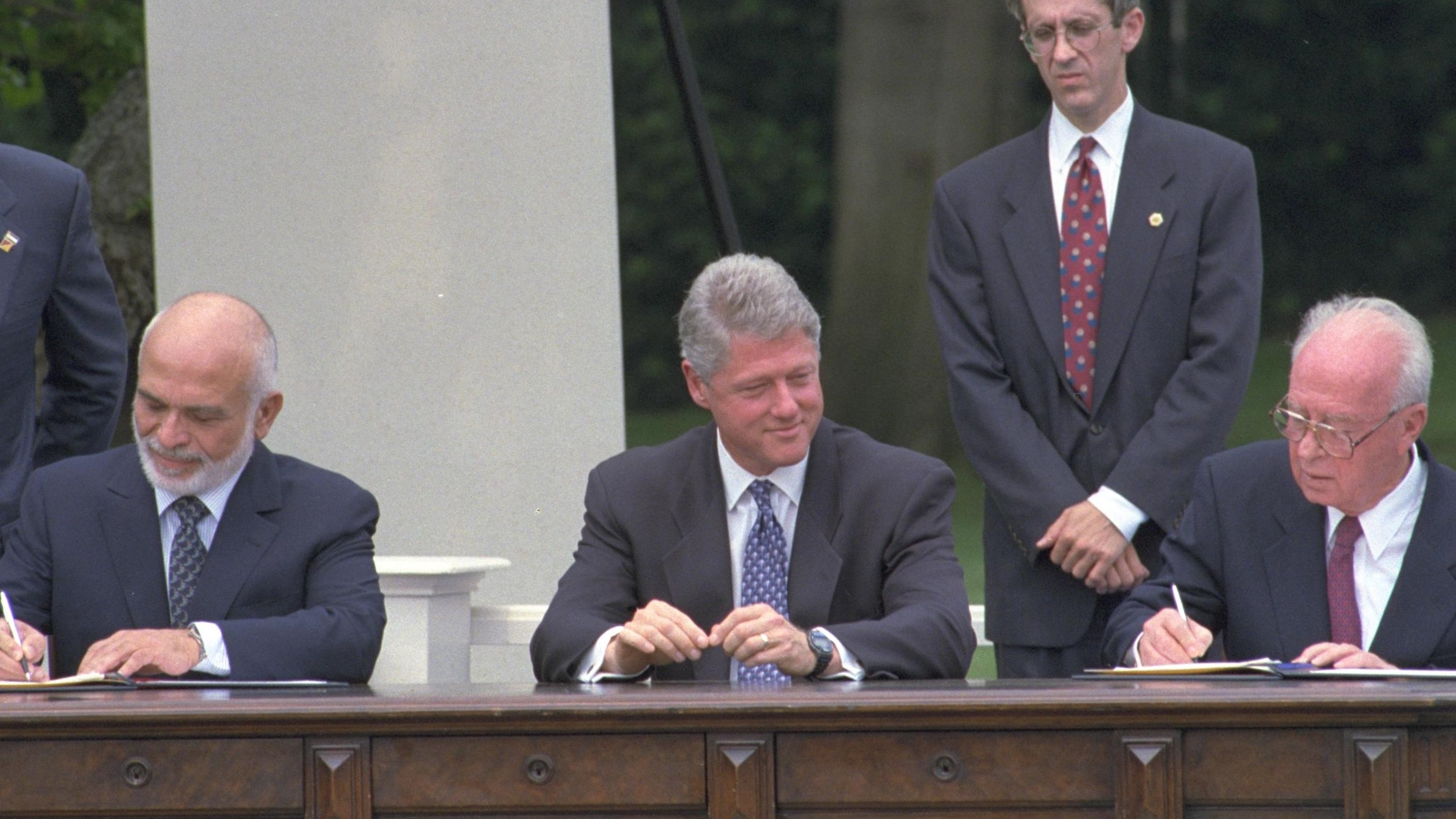
- U.S. President Bill Clinton (center) watches Jordan's King Hussein (left) and Israeli Prime Minister Yitzhak Rabin (right) sign the Washington Declaration on the White House lawn
- Type: Peace treaty
- Signed: 26 October 1994; 32 years ago
- Location: Arabah, Israel
- Signatories: Yitzhak Rabin (Prime Minister of Israel); Abdelsalam Majali (Prime Minister of Jordan)
- Depositary: Secretary-General of the United Nations
- Citations: UNTS 35325
- Language: English

The Israel–Jordan peace treaty (formally the Treaty of Peace Between the State of Israel and the Hashemite Kingdom of Jordan), (Note: Hebrew: הסכם השלום בין ישראל לירדן, romanized: Heskem Ha-Shalom beyn Yisra'el Le-Yarden; Arabic: معاهدة السلام الأردنية الإسرائيلية, romanized: Mu'ahadat as-Salaam al-'Urdunniyah al-Isra'yliyah) sometimes referred to as the Wadi Araba Treaty, is an agreement that ended the state of war that had existed between the two countries since the 1948 Arab–Israeli War and established mutual diplomatic relations. In addition to establishing peace between the two countries, the treaty also settled land and water disputes, provided for broad cooperation in tourism and trade, and obligated both countries to prevent their territory being used as a staging ground for military strikes by a third country.

The signing ceremony took place at the southern border crossing of Arabah on 26 October 1994. Jordan was the second Arab country, after Egypt, to sign a peace accord with Israel.

== History ==
In 1987 Israeli foreign affairs minister Shimon Peres and King Hussein tried secretly to arrange a peace agreement in which Israel would concede the West Bank to Jordan. The two signed an agreement defining a framework for a Middle Eastern peace conference. The proposal was not consummated due to Israeli prime minister Yitzhak Shamir's objection. The following year Jordan abandoned its claim to the West Bank in favor of a peaceful resolution between Israel and the Palestine Liberation Organization (PLO).

Discussions began in 1994. Israeli prime minister Yitzhak Rabin and Foreign Minister Shimon Peres informed King Hussein that after the Oslo Accords with the PLO, Jordan might be "left out of the big game". Hussein consulted with Egyptian president Hosni Mubarak and Syrian president Hafez al-Assad. Mubarak encouraged him, but Assad told him only to "talk" and not sign any accord. U.S. president Bill Clinton pressured Hussein to start peace negotiations and to sign a peace treaty with Israel and promised him that Jordan's debts would be forgiven. The efforts succeeded and Jordan signed a nonbelligerency agreement with Israel. Rabin, Hussein and Clinton signed the Washington Declaration in Washington, D.C., on 25 July 1994. The Declaration says that Israel and Jordan ended the official state of enmity and would start negotiations in order to achieve an "end to bloodshed and sorrow" and a just and lasting peace.

== Signing ==
On 26 October 1994, Jordan and Israel signed the peace treaty in a ceremony held in the Arava valley of Israel, north of Eilat and near the Jordanian border. Prime Minister Rabin and Prime Minister Abdelsalam al-Majali signed the treaty and the President of Israel Ezer Weizman shook hands with King Hussein. Clinton observed, accompanied by US secretary of state Warren Christopher. Thousands of colorful balloons released into the sky ended the event.

Egypt welcomed the agreement while Syria ignored it. The Lebanese militia group Hezbollah resisted the treaty and 20 minutes prior to the ceremony launched mortar and rocket attacks against northern Galilee towns. Israeli residents, who were forced to evacuate the towns for the safety of shelters, took with them transistor radios and mobile TVs in order not to miss the historical moment of signing a second peace treaty with an Arab state.

== Content ==
The peace treaty consists of a preamble, 30 articles, 5 annexes, and agreed minutes. It settles issues about territory, security, water, and cooperation on a range of subjects.

- Annex I concerns borders and sovereignty. Section Annex I (a) establishes an "administrative boundary" between Jordan and the West Bank, occupied by Israel in 1967, without prejudice to the status of that territory. Israel recognises Jordan's sovereignty over the Naharayim/Baqura area (including Peace Island) and the Tzofar/Al Ghamr area.
- Annex II concerns water and related matters. Pursuant to Article 6 of the Treaty, Jordan and Israel agreed to establish a "Joint Water Committee" (Article VII).
- Annex III concerns crime and illicit drugs.
- Annex IV concerns environment.
- Annex V concerns border crossings, passports and visas. Article 6 stipulates that ″Each Party has the right to refuse entry to a person, in accordance with its regulations″.
- The Agreed Minutes of the treaty give some details about the implementation of the peace treaty.

=== Main principles ===
1. Borders: The international boundary between Israel and Jordan follows the Jordan and Yarmouk Rivers, the Dead Sea, the Emek Ha'Arava/Wadi Araba, and the Gulf of Aqaba. The section of the line that separated Jordan from the West Bank was stipulated as "without prejudice to the status of [that] territory."
2. Diplomatic relations and cooperation: The Parties agreed to establish full diplomatic and consular relations and to exchange resident embassies, grant tourists visas, open air travel and seaports, establish a free trade zone and an industrial park in the Arava. The agreement prohibits hostile propaganda.
3. Security and defense: Each country promised respect for the sovereignty and territory of each side, to not enter the other's territory without permission, and to cooperate against terrorism. This included thwarting border attacks, smuggling, preventing any hostile attack against the other and not cooperating with any terrorist organization against the other.
4. Jerusalem: Article 9 links the Peace Treaty to the Israeli–Palestinian peace process. Israel recognized the special role of Jordan in Muslim holy shrines in Jerusalem and committed itself to give high priority to the Jordanian historic role in these shrines in negotiations on the permanent status.
5. Water: Israel agreed to give Jordan 50,000,000 cubic metres (1.8×10^{9} cu ft) of water each year and for Jordan to own 75% of the water from the Yarmouk River. Both countries could develop other water resources and reservoirs and agreed to help each other survive droughts. Israel also agreed to help Jordan use desalination technology in order to find additional water.
6. Palestinian refugees: Israel and Jordan agreed to cooperate to help the refugees, including a four-way committee (Israel, Jordan, Egypt and the Palestinians) to try to work towards solutions.

== Follow-up ==
Wolfsfeld et al. (2002) said that Prime Minister Rabin and King Hussein collaborated in selling the agreement to their people. The Knesset approved the agreement 92 to 3, but "The level of elite support in Jordan was considerably lower. ... [A] number of political parties and institutions were opposed to making peace with Israel."

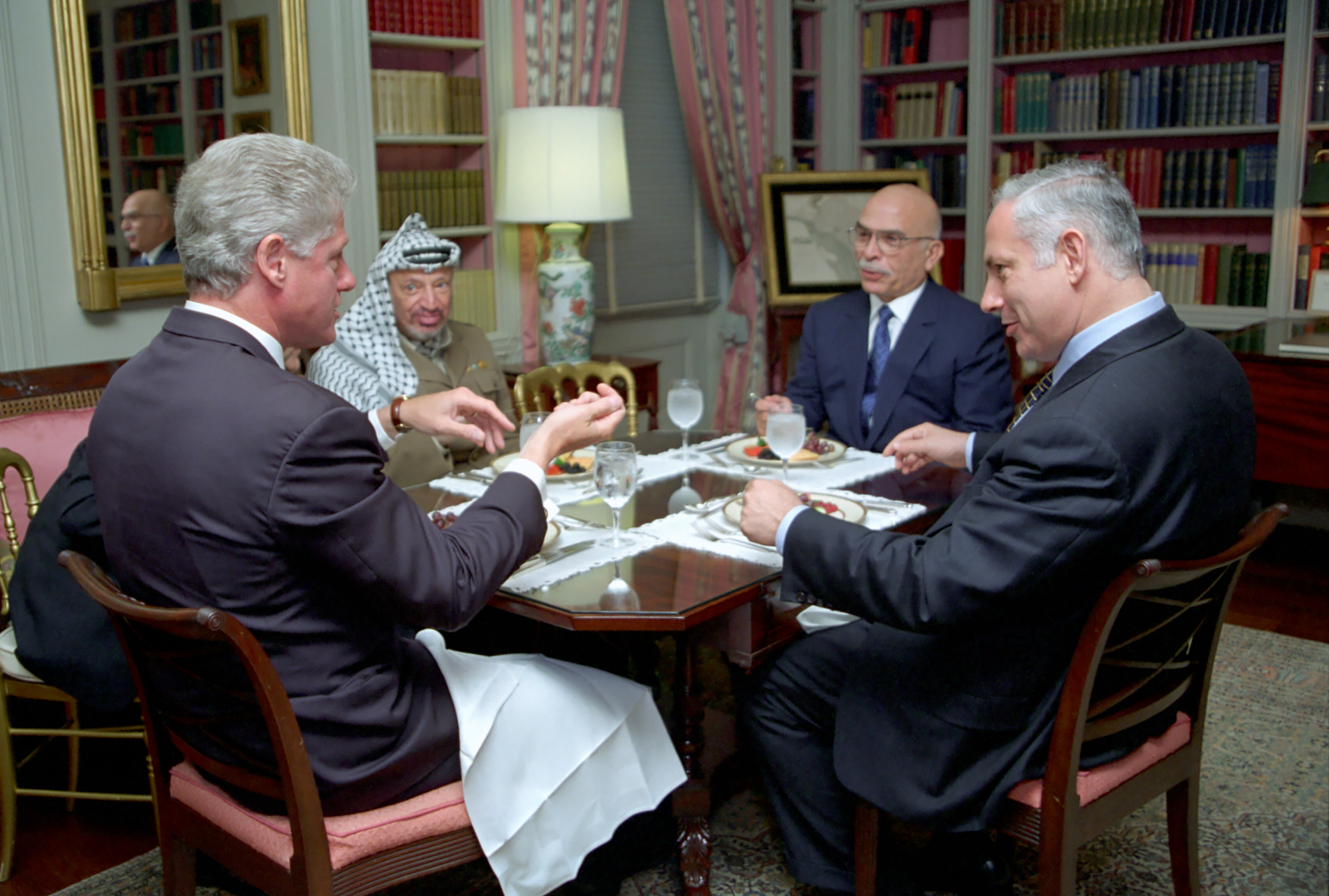
President Bill Clinton with King Hussein of Jordan, Israeli Prime Minister Benjamin Netanyahu and Palestinian leader Yasser Arafat in October 1996

Following the agreements, Israel and Jordan opened their borders. Several border-crossings were erected, allowing tourists, businessmen and workers to travel between the two countries. Israeli tourists started to visit Jordan, many to see the sela ha'adom ("Red Rock") of Petra – a stone-carved city of the Nabataeans which had fascinated Israelis during the 1950s and 1960s, often luring adventurers to visit it secretly.

On 4 November 1995 the Israeli prime minister Yitzhak Rabin was assassinated by a Jewish extremist, who aimed to undermine Rabin's peace efforts with the Palestinians. Due to the close relationship forged with Rabin during the negotiations of the treaty, Hussein was invited to give a speech during Rabin's funeral in Jerusalem. This was the first time Hussein had been in Jerusalem since the 1967 war. Hussein drew parallels between Rabin's assassination and his grandfather's assassination in 1951: "We are not ashamed, nor are we afraid, nor are we anything but determined to continue the legacy for which my friend fell, as did my grandfather in this city when I was with him and but a boy."

Jordan received $698.4 million of debt relief from the US government from 1995 onwards. Jordan's signing of a peace treaty with Israel, and other issues, were met with disdain by Syria's president Hafez al-Assad. The CIA handed the King a detailed report in December 1995 warning him of a Syrian plot to assassinate him and his brother Hassan. A month later, the CIA sent Hussein another report warning Jordan of Iraqi plots to attack Western targets in Jordan to undermine Jordan's security due to its support for the Iraqi opposition. In Israel, Shimon Peres of the leftist Labor Party and Benjamin Netanyahu of the right-wing Likud party, were competing for the post of prime minister. Hussein's popularity in Israel had peaked after the peace treaty was signed, and he was expected to express support for a candidate. Hussein initially remained neutral, but later expressed support for Netanyahu. Efraim Halevy, then head of the Israeli intelligence agency (Mossad), claims that Hussein had preferred Netanyahu over Peres as he had deeply mistrusted the latter. The Israeli general election held on 29 May 1996 witnessed Netanyahu's ascension to the prime ministry.

My distress is genuine and deep over the accumulating tragic actions which you have initiated at the head of the Government of Israel, making peace – the worthiest objective of my life – appear more and more like a distant elusive mirage. I could remain aloof if the very lives of all Arabs and Israelis and their future were not fast sliding towards an abyss of bloodshed and disaster, brought about by fear and despair. I frankly cannot accept your repeated excuse of having to act the way you do under great duress and pressure. I cannot believe that the people of Israel seek bloodshed and disaster and oppose peace. Nor can I believe that the most constitutionally powerful Prime Minister in Israeli history would act on other than his total convictions. The saddest reality that has been dawning on me is that I do not find you by my side in working to fulfill God's will for the final reconciliation of all the descendants of the children of Abraham. Your course of actions seems bent on destroying all I believe in or have striven to achieve . . .

— From King Hussein's letter to Prime Minister Benjamin Netanyahu on 9 March 1997

Hussein's support for Netanyahu soon backfired. Israel's actions during the 1996 Qana massacre in Southern Lebanon, the Likud government's decision to build settlements in East Jerusalem, and the events at the Temple Mount where clashes between Palestinian and Israeli police ensued after Israeli tunnel diggings around the Mount, generated an uproar of criticism for Netanyahu in the Arab World. On 9 March 1997 Hussein sent Netanyahu a three-page letter expressing his disappointment. The King lambasted Netanyahu, with the letter's opening sentence stating: "My distress is genuine and deep over the accumulating tragic actions which you have initiated at the head of the Government of Israel, making peace – the worthiest objective of my life – appear more and more like a distant elusive mirage."

Four days later, on 13 March, a Jordanian soldier patrolling the borders between Jordan and Israel in the north near the Island of Peace, killed seven Israeli schoolgirls and wounded six others. The King, who was on an official visit to Spain, returned home immediately. He travelled to the Israeli town of Beit Shemesh to offer his condolences to the grieving families of the Israeli children killed. He went on his knees in front of the families, telling them that the incident was "a crime that is a shame for all of us. I feel as if I have lost a child of my own. If there is any purpose in life it will be to make sure that all the children no longer suffer the way our generation did." His gesture was received very warmly in Israel, and Hussein sent the families $1 million in total as compensation for the loss of life. The soldier was determined to be mentally unstable by a Jordanian military tribunal and was sentenced to 20 years in prison, which he served entirely.

Clashes between Israeli forces and Palestinian militant groups in Gaza and the West Bank surfaced. Hussein's wife, Queen Noor, later claimed her husband was having trouble sleeping: "Everything he had worked for all his life, every relationship he had painstakingly built on trust and respect, every dream of peace and prosperity he had had for Jordan's children, was turning into a nightmare. I really did not know how much more Hussein could take."

On 27 September 1997 eight Mossad agents entered Jordan using fake Canadian passports and attempted to assassinate Jordanian citizen Khaled Mashal, head of the militant Islamist Palestinian group Hamas. Hussein was preparing for a 30-year Hamas-Israel truce three days prior to the attempt, after Hamas had launched two attacks in Jerusalem. Two Mossad agents followed Mashal to his office and injected poison into his ears, but they were caught by Mashal's bodyguard. The two agents were then held by the Jordanian police, while the six other agents hid in the Israeli embassy. Furious, Hussein met with an Israeli delegate who attempted to explain the situation; the King said in a speech about the incident that he felt that somebody "had spat in his face." Jordanian authorities requested Netanyahu to provide an antidote to save Mashal's life, but Netanyahu refused to do so. Jordan then threatened to storm the Israeli embassy and capture the rest of the Mossad team, but Israel argued that it would be against the Geneva Conventions. Jordan replied that the Geneva Conventions "do not apply to terrorists", and a special operations team headed by Hussein's son Abdullah was put in charge of the operation. Hussein called American President Clinton and requested his intervention, threatening to annul the treaty if Israel did not provide the antidote. Clinton later managed to get Israel's approval to reveal the name of the antidote, and complained about Netanyahu: "This man is impossible!" Khaled Mashal recovered, but Jordan's relations with Israel deteriorated and Israeli requests to contact Hussein were rebuffed. The Mossad operatives were released by Jordan after Israel agreed to release 23 Jordanian and 50 Palestinian prisoners including Sheikh Ahmed Yassin.

Mounting opposition in Jordan to the peace treaty with Israel led Hussein to put greater restrictions on freedom of speech. Several dissidents were imprisoned including Laith Shubeilat, a prominent Islamist. A few months into his imprisonment, the King personally gave Shubeilat, his fiercest critic, a ride home from the Swaqa prison. However, the crackdown led the opposition groups in Jordan to boycott the 1997 parliamentary elections. In 1998 Jordan refused a secret request from Netanyahu to attack Iraq using Jordanian airspace after claiming Saddam held weapons of mass destruction.

In December 2013, Israel and Jordan signed an agreement to build a desalination plant on the Red Sea, near the Jordanian port of Aqaba, as part of the Red Sea–Dead Sea Canal.

In October 2018, Jordan notified Israel of its intention not to renew lands leased under Annex I of the agreement. The annex granted Jordan the right not to renew the lease of Naharayim (Baqoura) and Tzofar/Al Ghamr after 25 years, given that a notice is given a year prior.

== Gallery ==
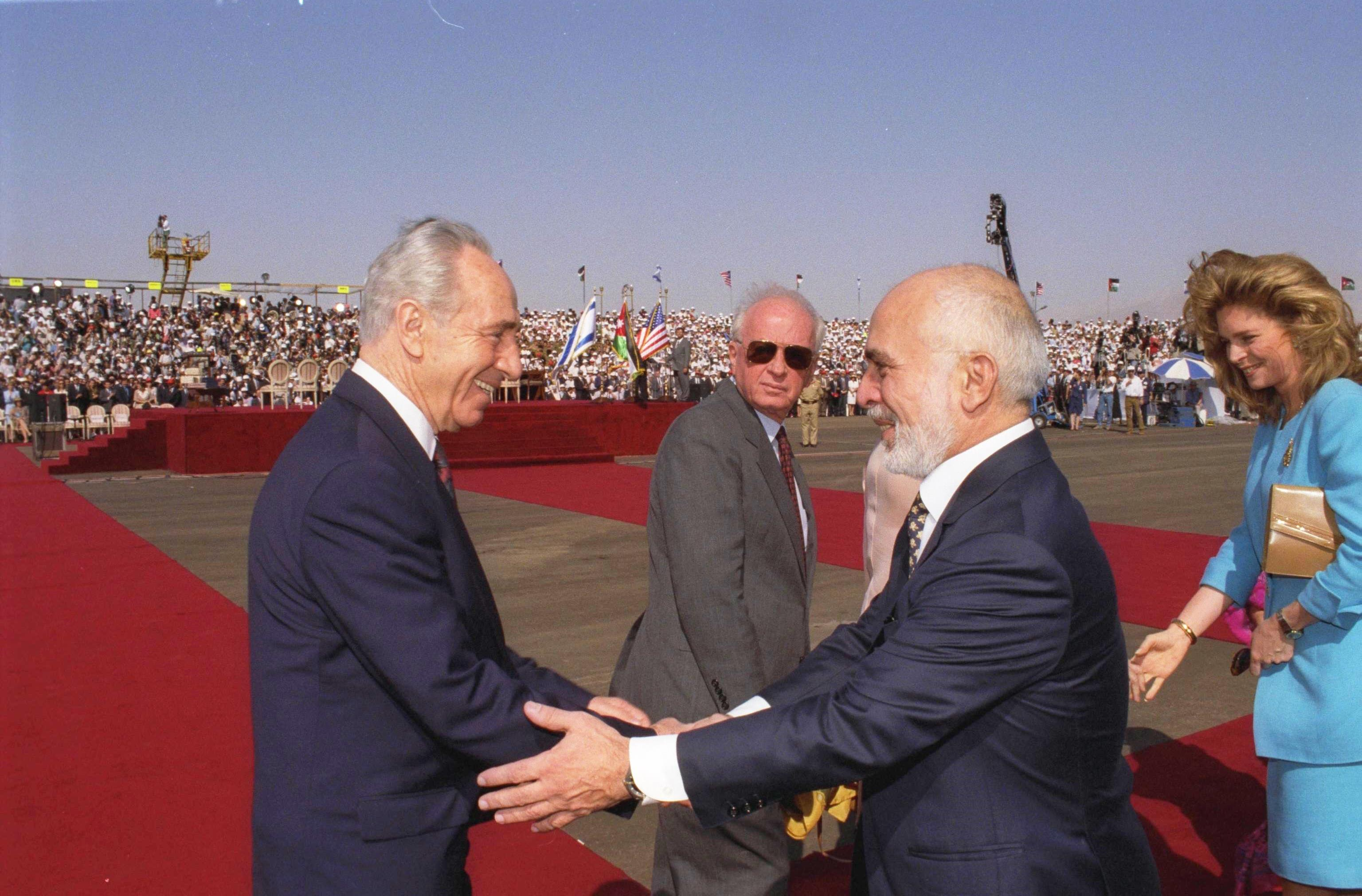
Shimon Peres (left) with Yitzhak Rabin (center) and King Hussein of Jordan (right), prior to signing the Israel–Jordan peace treaty.

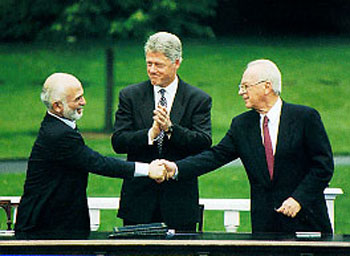
A handshake between King Hussein and PM Rabin, accompanied by President Clinton, during the Israel-Jordan peace negotiations, 25 July 1994

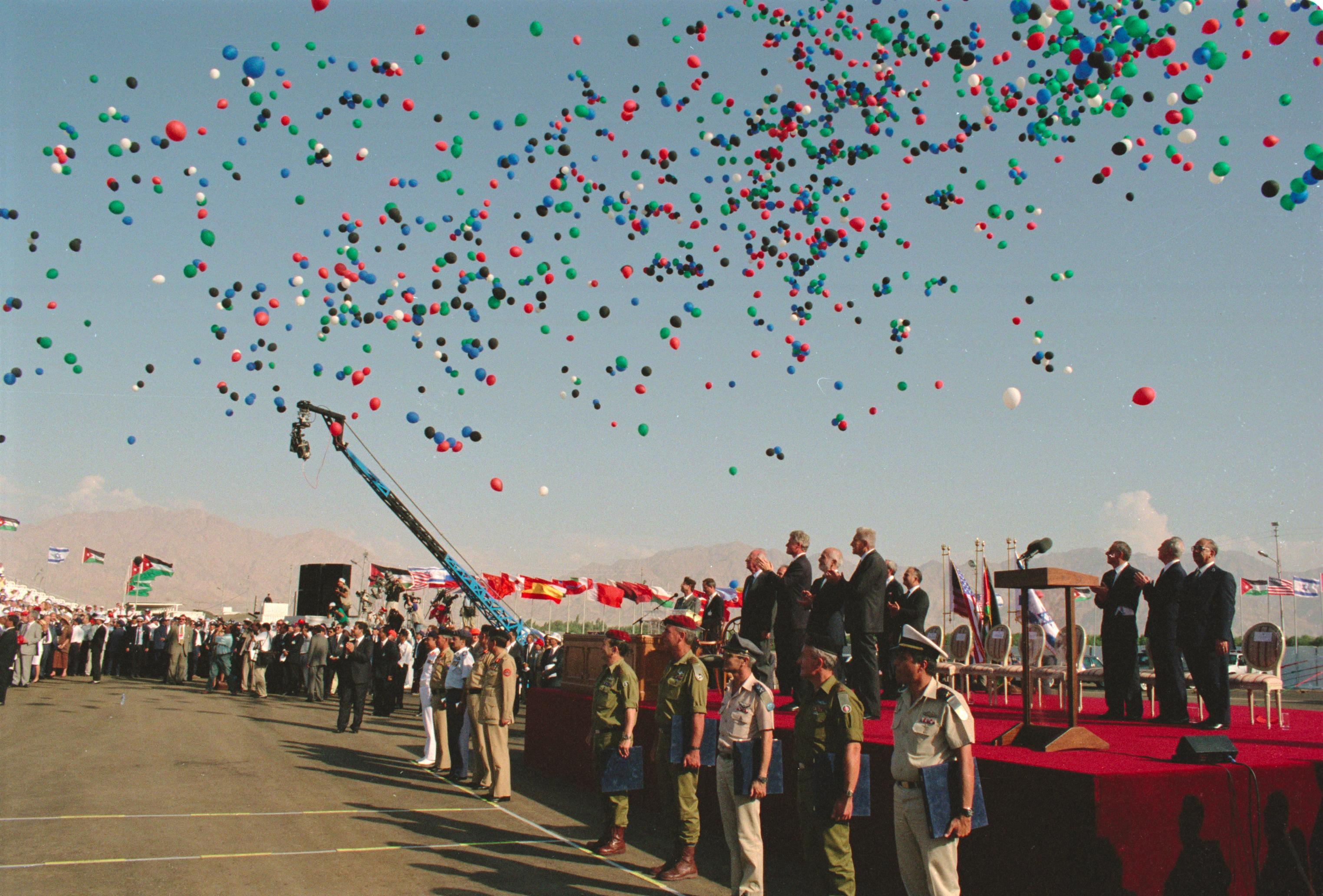
Balloons released into the air during the Israel-Jordan Peace Treaty signing ceremony at the Arava Terminal

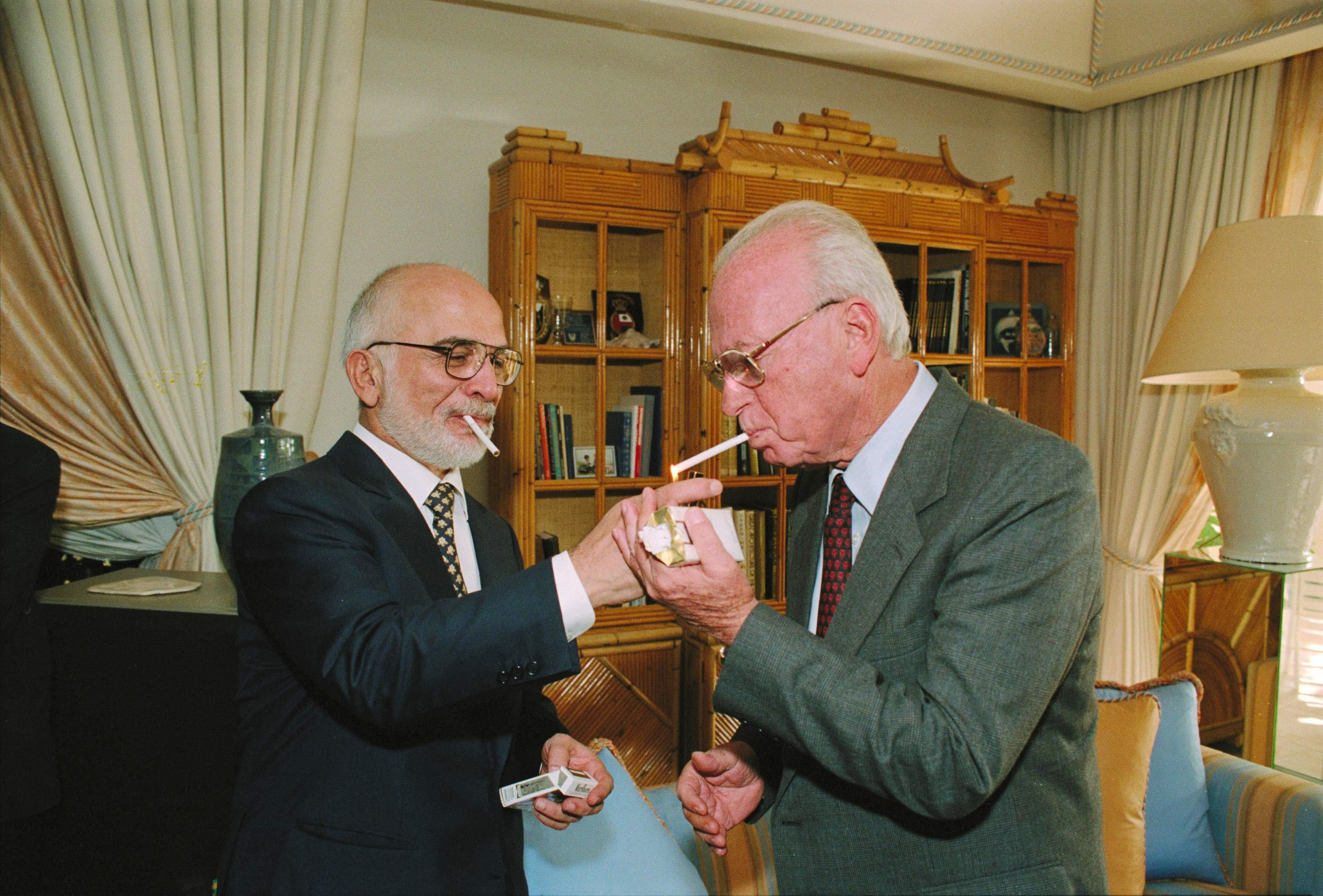
King Hussein lights Yitzhak Rabin's cigarette at the royal residence in Aqaba, shortly after the signing of the peace treaty, 26 October 1994

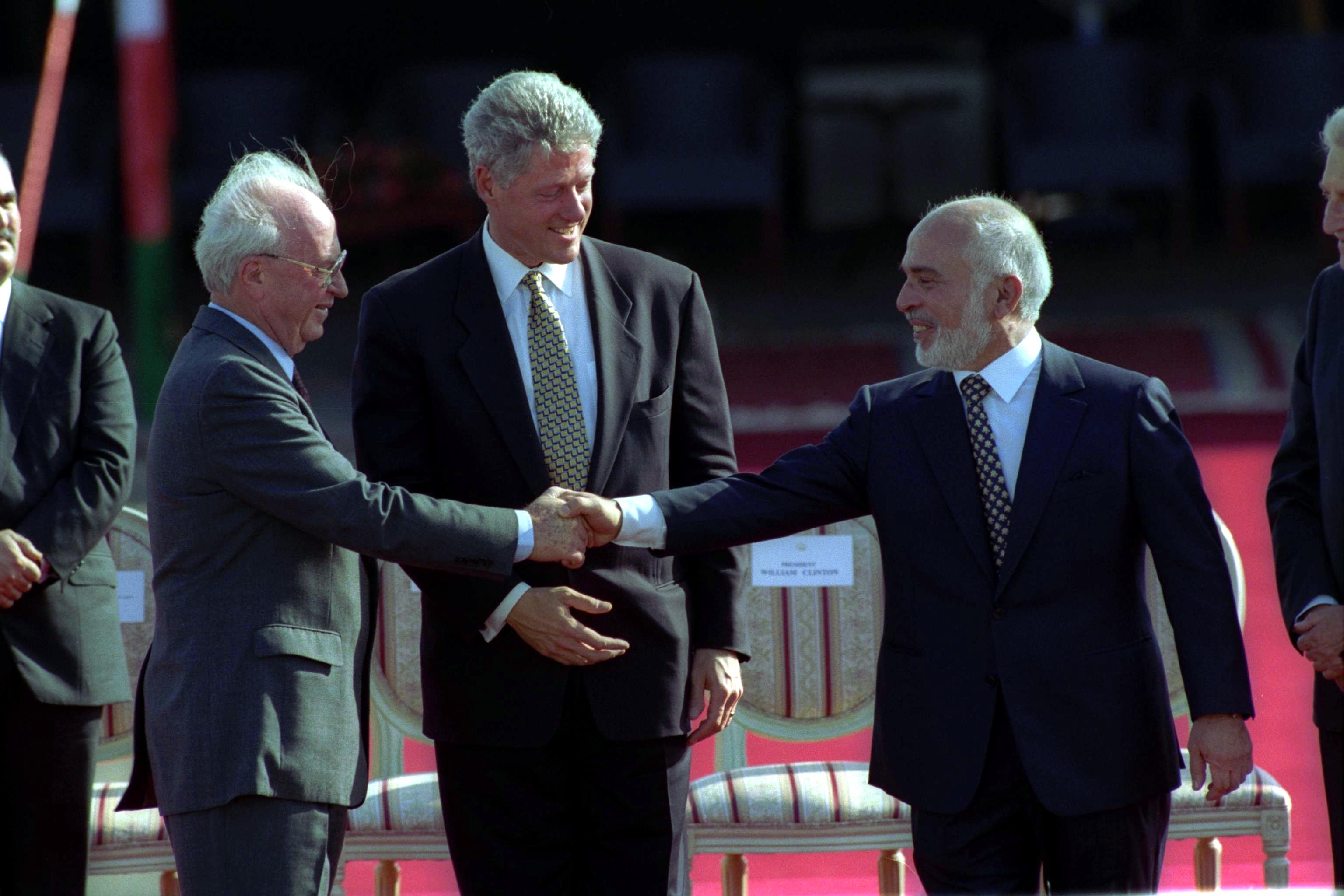
U.S. President Bill Clinton watches Jordan's King Hussein and Israeli Prime Minister Yitzhak Rabin shaking hands, October 1994

Excerpts from the signing of the peace agreement with Jordan in a video clip of the Channel 2 news company, 1994

== See also ==
- Arab–Israeli conflict
- Recognition of Israel
- Hashemite custodianship of Jerusalem holy sites
- Abraham Accords
- Bahrain–Israel normalization agreement
- Camp David Accords
- Egypt–Israel peace treaty
- Israel–Morocco normalization agreement
- Israel–Sudan normalization agreement
- Israel–United Arab Emirates normalization agreement
- Kosovo and Serbia economic normalization agreements (2020)

== Bibliography ==
- Shlaim, Avi (2009). Lion of Jordan: The Life of King Hussein in War and Peace. Vintage Books. ISBN 9781400078288.
- Wolfsfeld, Gadi; Rami George Khouri; Yoram Peri (2002). "News About the Other in Jordan and Israel: Does Peace Make a Diﬀerence?". Political Communication. 19: 189–210. ISSN 1058-4609. Wikidata Q125474891.
