= Economy of Palestine =

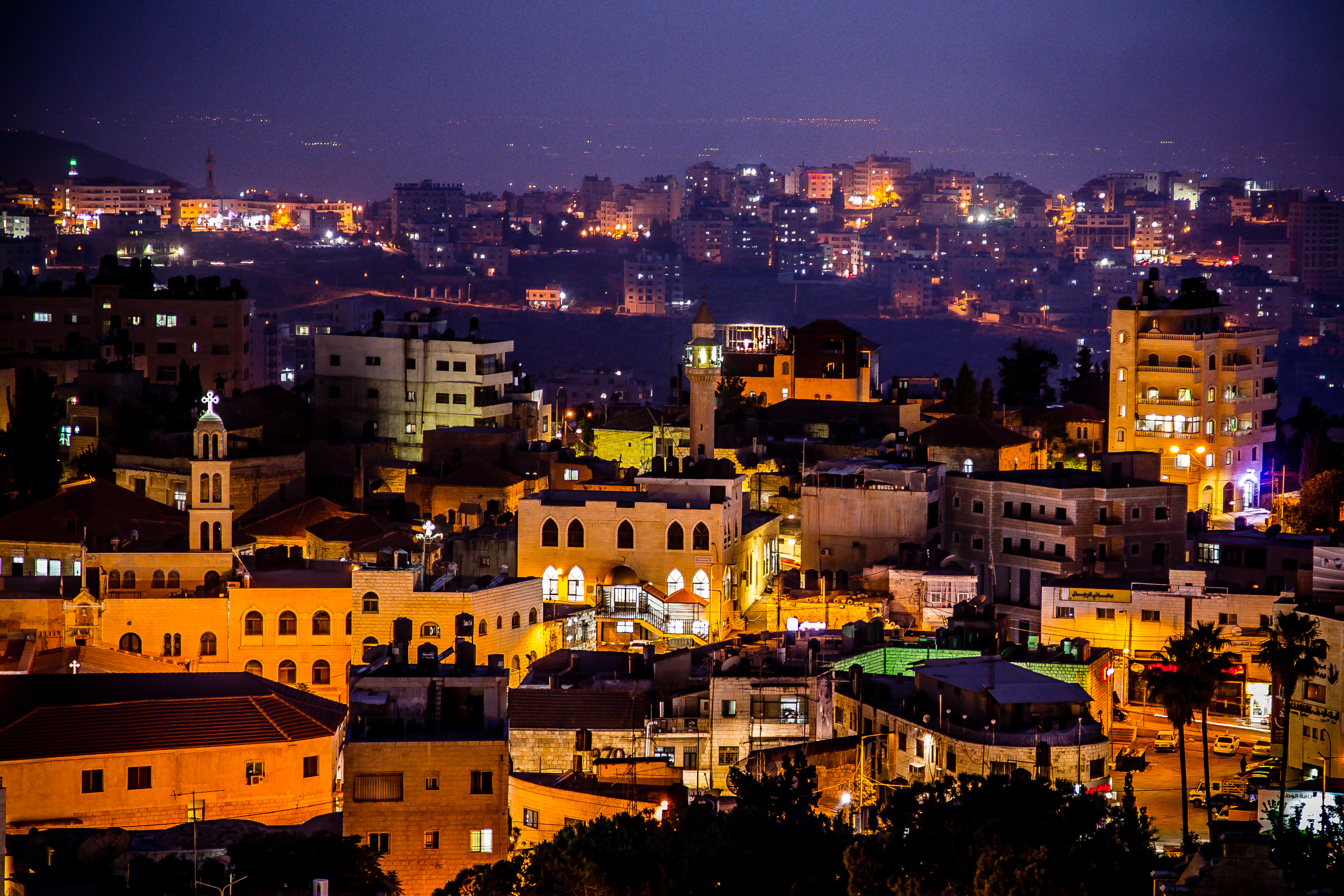
- Ramallah, the financial hub of Palestine
- Currency: No official currency (Note: Presently, Palestine does not issue its own currency. It relies on a multi-currency system, primarily using the Israeli new shekel (ILS) for financial transactions. The Jordanian dinar (JOD) and U.S. dollar (USD) are widely used.)
- Fiscal year: Calendar year
- Trade organisations: OIC, Group of 77
- Country group: Developing/Emerging; Lower-middle income economy

Statistics
- Population: ▲5,876,648 (2025)
- GDP: ▲$14 billion (2026f); ▼$13.79 billion (2027f)
- GDP growth: ▲4.1% (2025); ▲4.5% (2026f)
- GDP per capita: ▼$2,064 (nominal, 2026f); ▼$3,846 (PPP, 2024e)
- GDP by sector: Agriculture: 5.5%; Industry: 23.4%; Services: 71.1%; (2014 UN data)
- Inflation (CPI): ▲3% (2026)
- Human Development Index: ▲0.690 medium (2018) (119th); ▲0.597 medium IHDI (2018)
- Labour force: ▲1,316,023 (2019); ▼32.0% employment rate (2018)
- Labour force by occupation: Agriculture: 12%; Industry: 23%; Services: 65%; (2008 est.)
- Unemployment: ▼51.1% (2024)
- Main industries: Cement, quarrying, textiles, soap, olive-wood carvings, mother-of-pearl souvenirs, food processing

External
- Exports: $720 million (2011)
- Export goods: Olives, fruit, vegetables, limestone, citrus, flowers, textiles
- Main export partners: Israel 80.6%; Jordan 9.89%; United Arab Emirates 1.81%; United States 1.49%; Turkey 0.96%; Kuwait 0.9% (2022)
- Imports: $4.2 billion (2011)
- Import goods: Food, consumer goods, construction materials
- Main import partners: Israel 56.6%; Turkey 5.86%; Egypt 5.66%; Jordan 4.37%; China 3.8%; Germany 2.02% (2022)

Public finance
- Government debt: $4.2 billion (June 2013)
- Foreign reserves: $464 million (March 2016) (163nd)
- Budget balance: $1.3 billion (13% of GDP; 2012)
- Revenue: $2.2 billion (2012 est.)
- Spending: $3.54 billion (2012)
- All values, unless otherwise stated, are in US dollars.

Palestine has a developing economy. It based on substantial financial aid from various international donors, including governments and international organizations. Exports were recorded at US$1 billion, with an import value of US$6 billion. Main contributors to the national economy are the service sector (47%), wholesale and repair (19%), manufacturing (12%), agriculture (7%), finance and banking (3%), construction (5%), information technology (5%) and transportation sector (2%). Tourism in Palestine is centered around Bethlehem and Jerusalem while cities like Ramallah and Hebron are home to major economic centres.

Foreign aid supports the Palestinian Authority and public services. The Palestinian diaspora provide significant remittance income to the country. The economy remains heavily reliant on international aid from various sources, including UNRWA, Qatar, Turkey, the European Union, and non-governmental organizations. The Gazan labour market experiences mobility issues due to the Israeli blockade of goods and services in and out of Gaza. Approximately 100,000 Palestinians find employment in Israeli companies as low-cost labor, earning significantly less than the average Israeli worker.

== History ==
GDP per capita in the Palestinian territories rose by 7% per year from 1968 to 1980 but slowed during the 1980s. Between 1970 and 1991 life expectancy rose from 56 to 66 years, infant mortality per 1,000 fell from 95 to 42, households with electricity rose from 30% to 85%, households with safe water rose from 15% to 90%, households with a refrigerator rose from 11% to 85%, and households with a washing machine rose from 23% in 1980 to 61% in 1991.

Economic conditions in the West Bank and Gaza Strip, where economic activity was governed by the Paris Economic Protocol of April 1994 between Israel and the Palestinian Authority, deteriorated in the early 1990s. Real per capita GDP for the West Bank and Gaza Strip (WBGS) declined 36.1% between 1992 and 1996 owing to the combined effect of falling aggregate incomes and robust population growth. The downturn in economic activity was due to Israeli closure policies in response to terrorist attacks in Israel, which disrupted previously established labor and commodity market relationships. The most serious effect was the emergence of chronic unemployment. Average unemployment rates in the 1980s were generally under 5%; while by the mid-1990s it had risen to over 20%. After 1997, Israel's use of comprehensive closures decreased and new policies were implemented. In October 1999, Israel permitted the opening of a safe passage between the West Bank and the Gaza Strip in accordance with the 1995 Interim Agreement. These changes in the conduct of economic activity fueled a moderate economic recovery in 1998–99.

As a result of the Israeli blockade, 85% of factories were shut or operated at less than 20% capacity. It is estimated that Israeli businesses lost $2 million a day from the closure while Gaza lost approximately $1 million a day. The World Bank estimated the nominal GDP of the territories at US$4,007,000 and of Israel at US$161,822,000. Per capita these numbers are respectively US$1,036 and US$22,563 per year.

=== Prosperity ===
During the worldwide recession of the 1930s, Palestine, including its Arab population, suffered severe economic hardships. The global economic downturn had an impact on the region, leading to economic decline and increased unemployment. However, by the end of World War II, Palestine had experienced a significant level of prosperity and was considered one of the most advanced countries in the Middle East in terms of economic development. This prosperity was attributed to several factors. Firstly, during the war, Palestine served as a center of British communications, which brought numerous benefits to the economy. The region benefited from contracts in transport, military construction, and supply, as well as the establishment of a large oil refinery in Haifa. These activities created employment opportunities and stimulated economic growth. Additionally, agricultural exports, particularly citrus fruit, saw a marked increase during this period. The disruption of supplies from other parts of the Mediterranean due to the war, especially the actions of the Germans, created a higher demand for Palestinian citrus products. This presented an opportunity for both Arab and Jewish citrus producers to take advantage of the increased demand and contribute to the economic growth. Although many contracts awarded by the British Mandatory authorities during this period went to the new Jewish immigrants, Arab Palestinians also benefited from the economic opportunities. Arab Palestinians were able to provide cheaper labor, which made them attractive for employment in various sectors. They found employment in the railroads, large military construction projects, and government departments like the police.

During the war, Palestine experienced a period of economic prosperity, which coincided with new forms of investment and trade that connected the region and its entrepreneurs to the global market. The profits generated during this time were invested in various financial instruments such as shares, government bonds, and commodity stocks. After the dispersion of people in 1948, some individuals were able to recover a portion of their wealth through these investments. The passage suggests that data collected by the Mandatory government provides estimates of the wealth held in Palestine during that period. According to the data, the total ownership of capital in the country in 1945 amounted to 281 million Palestinian pounds. Of this total, approximately 47 percent (132.6 million pounds) was owned by the Arab community. The majority of this wealth (74.8 million pounds) was invested in rural landholdings that could not be transferred abroad. However, there were other assets, such as investments in foreign stocks and shares, which were in a form that could be recovered by those who went into exile. These foreign liquid assets amounted to just over 39 million pounds. Additionally, Arab banks in Palestine held 7 million pounds in bank deposits, and another 3 million pounds were deposited in the Ottoman Bank or the local branch of Barclays Bank, some of which was recovered through international litigation in the early 1950s.

A significant portion of the bank deposits held in Arab banks in Palestine, amounting to approximately 10 million pounds, was transferred to Jordan. This transfer occurred as a result of the mass displacement of Palestinians during the 1948–1949 Arab-Israeli war, with many seeking refuge in Jordan. Furthermore, it mentions that at least 1.5 million pounds in the form of banknotes was brought into the country prior to the abolition of the Palestinian currency. This indicates that individuals who left Palestine took physical banknotes with them as they sought refuge or migrated to other regions. At least 1.5 million pounds in the form of banknotes was transferred to Syria. Smaller amounts being sent to Egypt and Iraq. These transfers suggest that some individuals who left Palestine took physical banknotes with them to these countries.

=== Economic rise (1970—2000) ===
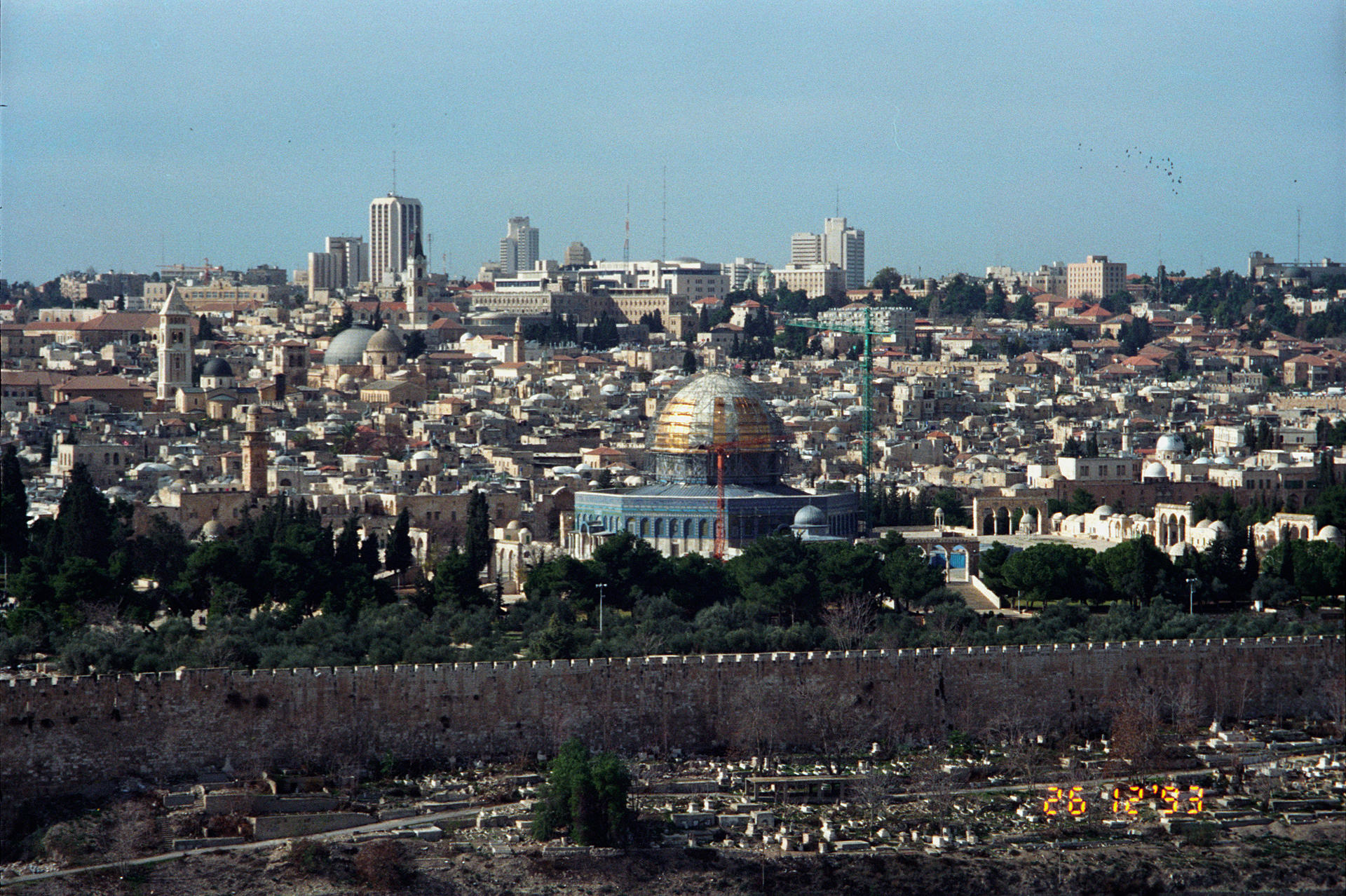
East Jerusalem in 1993, the year of Oslo Accords

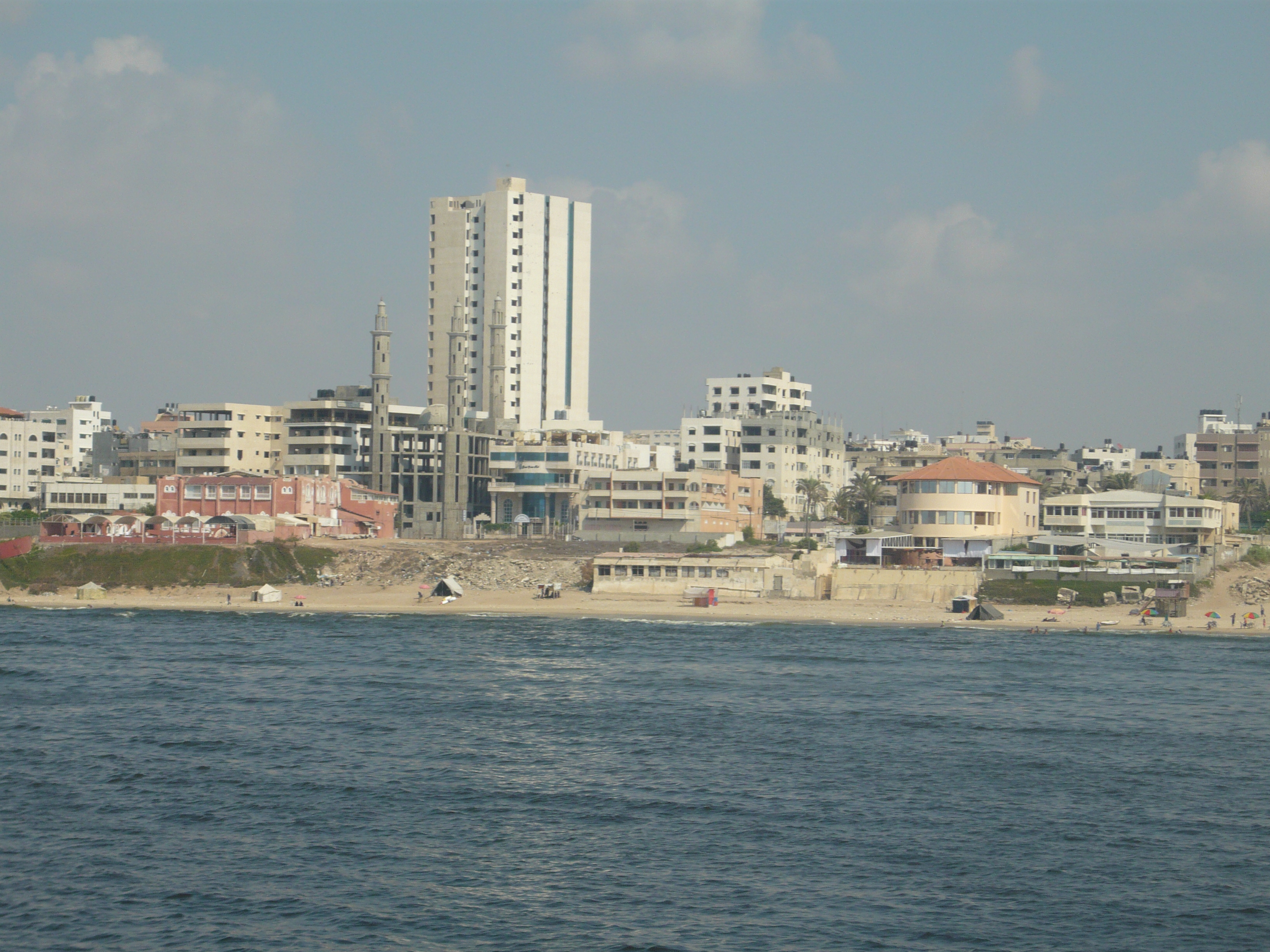
Modern buildings in Gaza before intifada in 2000

During the 1970s and subsequent years, a considerable number of Palestinians sought employment opportunities in Israel. This labor integration provided income and remittances, which had positive effects on the Palestinian economy. Palestinian workers played a significant role in various sectors of the Israeli economy, such as construction, agriculture, and manufacturing. While there were some economic benefits from labor integration, the overall economic disparities between Israel and the occupied Palestinian territories persisted. Palestinians faced limited access to resources, markets, and capital, which hindered their economic development.

Integration into the Israeli labor market provided Palestinians with access to job opportunities that were not readily available in the occupied territories. Palestinians found employment in various sectors, including construction, agriculture, manufacturing, and services. This helped alleviate unemployment and provided a source of income for Palestinian workers and their families. The General Federation of Trade Unions, representing Palestinian workers, was founded to advocate for their rights and interests.

Palestinian exports peaked in 1981 followed by a decline through the 1990s. In the same time period imports nearly doubled, increasing a trade deficit of 35% of GDP in 1981 to a deficit of 45% of GDP in 1996. The first Intifada, a Palestinian uprising against Israeli occupation, which took place from 1987 to 1993, had a profound impact on the Palestinian economy. The Intifada led to widespread disruptions, closures, and restrictions imposed by Israel, which greatly affected economic activities and livelihoods. In 1991, the invasion of Kuwait and resulting Gulf War affected the Palestinian economy. The Madrid Conference, held that same year, improved economic collaboration between the Arab countries and Israel.

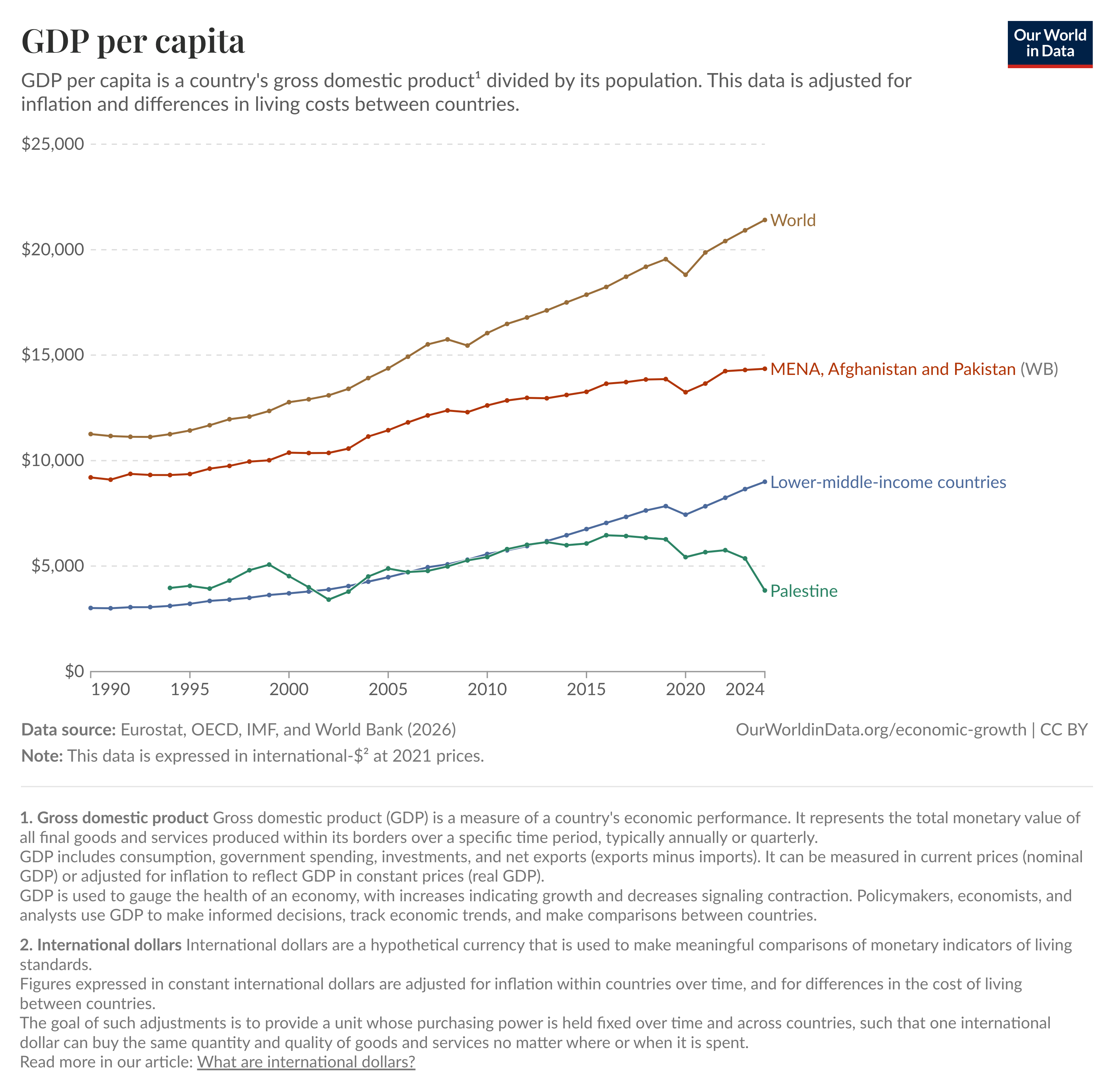
Palestine's GDP per capita from 1990 to 2024

The Oslo Accords, signed in the 1990s, led to the establishment of the Palestinian Authority (PA) and limited self-governance in parts of the West Bank and Gaza. The PA took on responsibilities in areas such as trade, investment, and public services. However, the overall impact on the Palestinian economy was mixed, as the peace process faced setbacks and the Israeli occupation persisted. In 1994, The Paris Protocol was signed, outlining economic relations between Israel and the PA, including provisions for labor movement and employment. Next year, the Israeli government imposed restrictions on the movement of Palestinian workers within Israel due to security concerns. The PA assumed control over some economic sectors, including tourism, trade, and investment by 1995. Until 1999 the Palestinian economy experienced a period of relative growth and stability with increased international aid and improved economic indicators.

For 30 years, Israel permitted thousands of Palestinians to enter the country each day to work in construction, agriculture and other blue-collar jobs. During this period, the Palestinian economy was significantly greater than the majority of Arab states. Until the mid-1990s, up to 150,000 people—about a fifth of the Palestinian labor force—entered Israel each day. After Palestinians unleashed a wave of suicide bombings, the idea of separation from the Palestinians took root in Israel. Israel found itself starved for labor, and gradually replaced most of the Palestinians with migrants from Thailand, Romania and elsewhere.

=== Intifada and recovery (2000–present) ===
In 2005, the PNA Ministry of Finance cited the Israeli West Bank barrier, whose construction began in the second half of 2002, as one reason for the depressed Palestinian economic activity. Real GDP growth in the West Bank declined substantially in 2000, 2001, and 2002, and increased modestly in 2003 and 2004. The World Bank attributed the modest economic growth since 2003 to "diminished levels of violence, fewer curfews, and more predictable (albeit still intense) closures, as well as adaptation by Palestinian business to the contours of a constrained West Bank economy". Under a "disengagement scenario" the Bank predicted a real growth rate of −0.2% in 2006 and −0.6% in 2007.

In the wake of Israel's unilateral disengagement from Gaza, there were shortages of bread and basic supplies due to closure of the al Mentar/Karni border-crossing into Israel. Israel's offer to open other crossings was turned down by the Hamas-run Palestinian authority.

Following the January 2006 legislative elections, decisively won by Hamas, the Quartet (apart from Russia) cut all funds to the Palestinian Authority led by prime minister Ismail Haniyah (Hamas). The PA had a monthly cash deficit of $60 million-$70 million after it received $50 million – $55 million a month from Israel in taxes and customs duties collected by Israeli officials at the borders. After the elections, the Palestinian stock market fell about 20%, and the PA exhausted its borrowing capacity with local banks. Israel ceased transferring $55 million in tax receipts to the PA. These funds accounted for a third of the PA's budget and paid the wages of 160,000 Palestinian civil servants (among them 60,000 security and police officers). The United States and the European Union halted direct aid to the PA, while the US imposed a financial blockade on PA's banks, impeding the transfer of some of the Arab League's funds (e.g. Saudi Arabia and Qatar). In May 2006, hundreds of Palestinians demonstrated in Gaza and the West Bank demanding payment of their wages. Tension between Hamas and Fatah rose as a result of this "economic squeeze" on the PA.

In 2009, the Israeli military removed its checkpoint at the entrance of Jenin in a series of reductions in security measures. In September 2012, EU activists stated that the Palestinian economy "lost access to 40% of the West Bank, 82% of its groundwater and more than two-thirds of its grazing land" due to the occupation and settlement construction.

The first planned Palestinian city named Rawabi is under construction north of Ramallah, with the help of funds from Qatar. In 2013, commercial trade between Israel and the Palestinian territories was valued at US$20 billion annually.

== Sectors ==
=== Agriculture ===
Agriculture is a mainstay in the economy. The production of agricultural goods supports the population's sustenance needs and fuels Palestine's export economy. According to the Council for European Palestinian Relations, the agricultural sector formally employs 13.4% of the population and accounts for 90% of informal employment. Around 183,000 hectares of land in the Palestinian territories are cultivated, of which around half is used for olive production. Olive products earn more in export income than any other agricultural crop.

Over the past 10 years, unemployment rates in Palestine have increased and the agricultural sector became the most impoverished sector in Palestine.

Palestinian agriculture suffers from numerous problems, blockades to exportation of produce and importation of necessary inputs, widespread confiscation of land for nature reserves as well as military and settler use, confiscation and destruction of wells, and physical barriers within the West Bank. Because the root of the conflict is with land, the disputes between Israel and Palestine are well-manifested in the agriculture of Palestine.

=== High tech ===
During the 2000s, a high-tech sector emerged in the Palestinian territories, supported by its proximity to Israel, and by 2013, 4,500 Palestinians worked in the IT sector, specializing in software outsourcing (including outsourced work from Israeli companies), telecommunication development and manufacturing equipment. The Palestinian IT sector grew from 0.8% of GDP in 2008 to 5% in 2010. The industry has seen a 64% increase in foreign business since 2009. The majority of Palestinian IT companies are concerted in the city of Ramallah north of Jerusalem.

Since 2010, Israeli high-tech companies have begun to employ Palestinian engineers. To date, most of them are outsourced workers, but Mellanox, a computer hardware firm, plans to hire 15–20 Palestinian engineers as regular employees. Joint economic cooperation between Israelis and Palestinians officials has experienced growth over the past years. Starting in 2008, Cisco Systems began a concerted effort to jump-start the nascent Palestinian IT sector with a holistic ecosystem approach, encompassing venture capital, private equity, capacity building and direct outsourcing to Palestinian companies. The company invested $15 million toward that end and drew in other major international investors and donors, including Microsoft, HP and Google. The Palestinian IT sector has since grown from 0.8% of GDP in 2008 to 5% in 2010.

In May 2018, the World Bank published a major report into the Palestinian technology sector entitled, "Tech startup ecosystem in West Bank and Gaza." According to the report, as of early 2017, there were 241 active tech start-ups in Palestinian Territories, which has created a total of 1,247 jobs. The report also recorded 51 active investors in Palestinian tech companies (around 75 percent angel investors and 25 percent venture capital firms). Among the major VC firms listed are Sadara Ventures, Ibtikar Fund and Oasis500. Venture capital firms reported having invested just under US$150 million in over 40 Palestinian tech companies by 2017. The report also recorded 20 start-up accelerator programs, 19 of which are in the West Bank, and one, Gaza Sky Geeks, in the Gaza Strip. Today Palestine is known as the "Silicon Valley of the NGOs".

=== Traditional industries ===
A wide variety of handicrafts, many of which have been produced by Arabs in Palestine for hundreds of years, continue to be produced today. Palestinian handicrafts include embroidery work, pottery-making, soap-making, glass-making, weaving, and olive-wood and Mother of Pearl carvings, among others. Some Palestinian cities in the West Bank, particularly Bethlehem, Hebron and Nablus have gained renown for specializing in the production of a particular handicraft, with the sale and export of such items forming a key part of each city's economy.

=== Stonecutting ===
Stonecutting is a traditional source of income for the Palestinian economy. The annual average output per worker in the stone industry is higher than in any other sector. There are 650 stone production outlets in the West Bank, 138 of them in Beit Fajjar. The quarried material is cut into a rich range of pink, sand, golden, and off-white bricks and tiles known as Jerusalem stone. According to a 2014-2018 reported by the Palestinian Ministry of National Economy, the State of Palestine was the 12th largest producer of stone and marble globally, with an estimated 22 million square meters produced annually.

=== Tourism ===
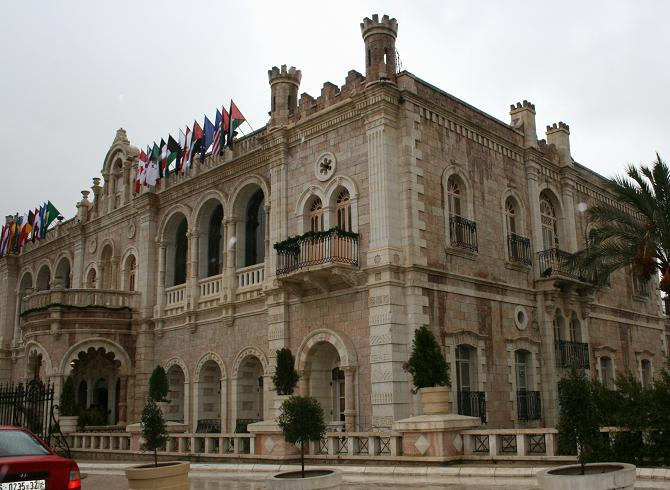
Intercontinental Jacir Palace in Bethlehem

In 2010, 4.6 million people visited the Palestinian territories, compared to 2.6 million in 2009. Of that number, 2.2 million were foreign tourists while 2.7 million were domestic. This number of international visits is misleading, however, since most tourists come for only a few hours or as part of a day trip itinerary. In the last quarter of 2012 over 150,000 guests stayed in West Bank hotels; 40% were European and 9% were from the United States and Canada. Major travel guides write recently that "the West Bank is not the easiest place in which to travel but the effort is richly rewarded."

The Palestinian Authority and Israeli tourism ministries have attempted to work together on tourism in the Palestinian territories in a Joint Committee. Recent cooperation to share access to foreign tourists has not proven successful in Palestine for many reasons relating to the occupation. Israel controls the movement of tourists into the West Bank. Foreign tourism is presently restricted to East Jerusalem and the West Bank, following the August 2013 indefinite closing of the Rafah crossing located between Egypt and the Hamas controlled Gaza Strip. There is essentially no tourist flow to Gaza since 2005 because of the ongoing Israeli military land, air, and sea blockade.

In 2013 Palestinian Authority Tourism minister Rula Ma'ay'a stated that her government aims to encourage international visits to Palestine, but the occupation is the main factor preventing the tourism sector from becoming a major income source to Palestinians. There are no visa conditions imposed on foreign nationals other than those imposed by the visa policy of Israel. Access to Jerusalem and the West Bank is controlled by the Government of Israel and access to Gaza is controlled by Hamas. Entry to the occupied Palestinian territories requires only a valid international passport but entry to Israel may be denied for Palestinians or Arabic visitors. In October 2009, a new project got underway promoting tourism and travel between the two areas. New business efforts and tourist attractions have been initiated in Jenin.

A large number of international brands operates their hotels in the Palestinian territories of both the West Bank and the Gaza Strip. These include Intercontinental Jacir Palace, Seven Arches Hotel Intercontinental, Marriott Gaza (later Al-Mashtal) and Millennium Palestine Ramallah Hotel. In 1995, Marriott International proposed to construct a business center-cum-luxury hotel in Gaza. The project was later changed to another hotel, in the same city.

=== Oil and gas ===
The presence of oil and gas reserves in Palestine has become a contentious issue, with some advocates suggesting that these fossil fuel resources are influencing Israel's attacks on the region. According to a 2019 U.N. report, it is estimated that over 3 billion barrels of oil exist off the coast and beneath the occupied lands of Palestine. Additionally, the Levant Basin in the Mediterranean is believed to hold around 1.7 billion barrels of oil, with another 1.5 billion barrels estimated to lie beneath the occupied West Bank area. However, under Israeli occupation, Palestinians are not allowed to drill for oil and gas or develop their independent energy systems, including solar energy. Meanwhile, Israel has been actively claiming these resources for itself, approving licenses for companies to explore for more offshore gas fields. The Israeli government is also interested in building a pipeline to export gas to European nations, particularly as Europe seeks alternative energy providers due to the ongoing conflict between Russia and Ukraine.

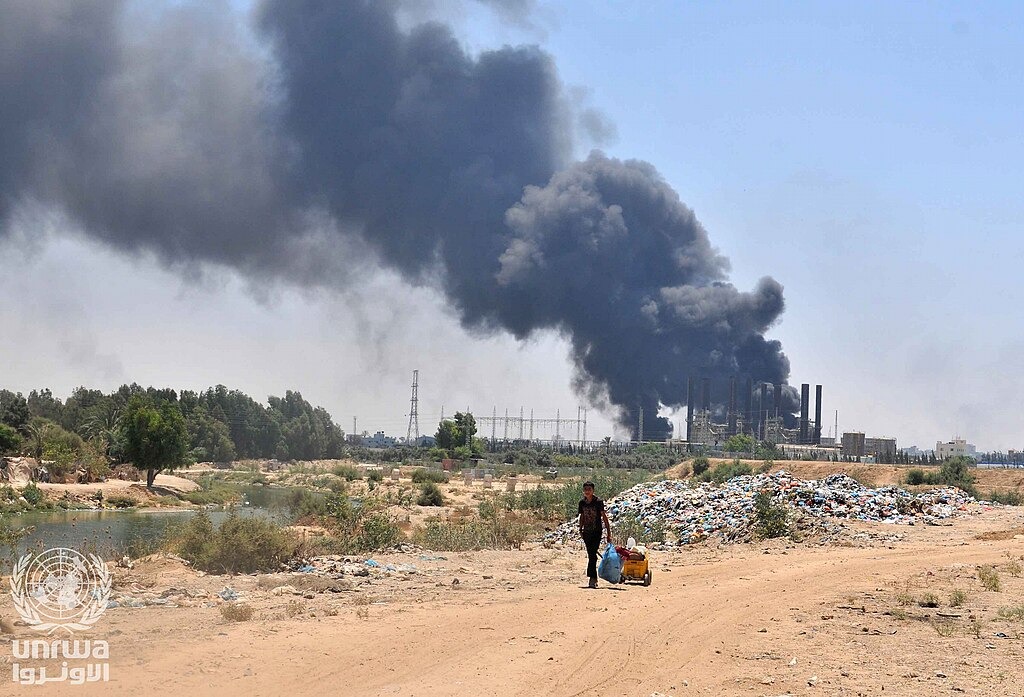
The Gaza Power Plant was attacked by the Israeli army during the 2014 Gaza War.

Many advocates argue that foreign interests in extracting these resources from Palestinian lands are contributing to the potential genocide faced by Palestinians. Throughout history, foreign policy in the Middle East has often revolved around fossil fuels, and this situation seems no different. The struggle between Israelis and Palestinians dates back to colonial times, with tensions and conflicts fueled by the desire for community, safety, and control of the land. The discovery of oil in the region further complicated the situation, as world powers sought to secure access to this crucial commodity. The intertwined history of oil and the creation of modern Middle Eastern states makes it difficult to separate conflicts in the region from the influence of oil and gas resources. The presence of billions of barrels of oil in Palestine, combined with the geopolitical interests of various actors, adds another layer of complexity to the Israel–Palestine conflict. When it comes to the presence of oil and gas reserves in Palestine, there is an ongoing conflict between Israel and Palestine over the ownership and exploitation of these resources. In 1999, a gas field was discovered about 20 miles off the coast of Gaza. However, negotiations between Israel and Palestine to divide these resources were disrupted by the Second Intifada, or Palestinian uprisings, which began in 2000.

Under international law, the oil and gas resources in Palestine should belong to the occupied territory and not the occupying power (Israel). However, Israel has been benefiting from the oil and gas reserves beneath Palestinian lands and waters. Palestine has been unable to access these resources, resulting in a loss of billions of dollars of economic potential. Moreover, there are concerns about the environmental impact of fossil fuel extraction, and Palestinian activists are pushing for a focus on renewable energy instead. The international community's complicity in the ongoing Israeli occupation and the conflict in Gaza is seen by some as intricately tied to capitalist interests and the pursuit of profit. The history of colonialism and the extraction of oil resources in the Middle East is seen as part of the wider context of the Israel-Palestine conflict. While some argue that fossil fuels have a marginal role in the conflict, others believe that religious ideology, geopolitical strategies, and access to trading routes play a bigger role. Overall, the conflict in Palestine and the pursuit of oil and gas resources have deep historical and geopolitical roots that contribute to the ongoing tensions in the region.

Palestine holds massive potential reserves of oil and gas. Over 3 billion barrels (480,000,000 m^{3}) of oil are estimated to exist off the coast and beneath occupied Palestinian lands. The Levant Basin holds around 1.7 billion barrels (270,000,000 m^{3}) of oil, with another 1.5 billion barrels (240,000,000 m^{3}) barrels beneath the occupied West Bank area. Around 2 billion barrels (320,000,000 m^{3}) of oil reserves are believed to exist in shore of the Gaza Strip. According to a report by the UNCTAD, around 1,250 billion barrels (1.99×10^{11} m^{3}) of oil reserves are in the occupied Palestinian territory of the West Bank, probably the Meged oil field. As per the Palestinian Authority, 80% of this oil field falls under the lands owned by Palestinians.

Masadder, a subsidiary of the Palestine Investment Fund is developing the oilfield in the West Bank. Block-1 field, which spans an area of 432 square kilometres (167 sq mi) from northwest Ramallah to Qalqilya in Palestine, has significant potential for recoverable hydrocarbon resources. It is estimated to have a P90 (a level of certainty) of 0.03 billion barrels (4,800,000 m^{3}) of recoverable oil and 6,000,000,000 cubic feet (170,000,000 m^{3}). The estimated cost for the development of the field is $390 million, and it will be carried out under a production sharing agreement with the Government of Palestine. Currently, an initial pre-exploration work program is underway to prepare for designing an exploration plan for approval, which will precede the full-fledged development of the field.

Natural gas in Palestine is mostly found in Gaza Strip. Gaza Marine is a natural gas field, located around 32 kilometres (20 mi) from the coast of the territory in the Mediterranean shore. It holds gas reserves ranging between 28 billion cubic metres (990 billion cubic feet) to 32 billion cubic metres (1.1 trillion cubic feet). These estimates far exceed the needs of the Palestinian territories in energy. The gas field was discovered by the British Gas Group in 1999. Upon the discovery of the gas field, it was lauded by Yasser Arafat as a "Gift from God". A regional cooperation between the Palestinian Authority, Israel and Egypt were signed for developing the field and Hamas also gave approval to the Palestinian Authority. However, since the ongoing Gaza war, this project have been delayed.

== Infrastructure ==
=== Communications ===
The World Bank estimated in 2016 that restrictive measures placed by Israel on telecommunication operators in the West Bank have had a notable negative impact on the development of the Palestinian telecommunications networks, which is sustaining losses in the range of $1 billion. These restrictive measures include the denial to operate in 60% of the West Bank under Israeli military administration (Area C), limitations on the importation of technology for ICT companies, requiring Palestinian operators to access international links via a company with Israeli registration, delaying in the provision of mobile broadband, the failure to set in place an independent regulator for the sector in the territories, and Israeli operators who lack appropriate authorizations who continue to operate in the Palestinian market.

== By sub-region ==
=== West Bank ===
In 2007, the economy in the West Bank improved gradually. Economic growth reached about 4–5% and unemployment dropped about 3%. Israeli figures indicated that wages in the West Bank rose more than 20% in 2008 and trade rose about 35%. Tourism in Bethlehem increased to about twice its previous levels, and tourism increased by 50% in Jericho. Life expectancy is 73.4, placing the territories 77th in the world, compared with a life expectancy of 72.5 in Jordan, 71.8 in Turkey, and 80.7 in Israel. Car sales in 2008 were double those of 2007. The International Monetary Fund report for the West Bank forecast a 7% growth rate for 2009.

The Bethlehem Small Enterprise Center opened in early 2008. Funded by Germany, the center has helped to promote computer literacy and marketing skills.

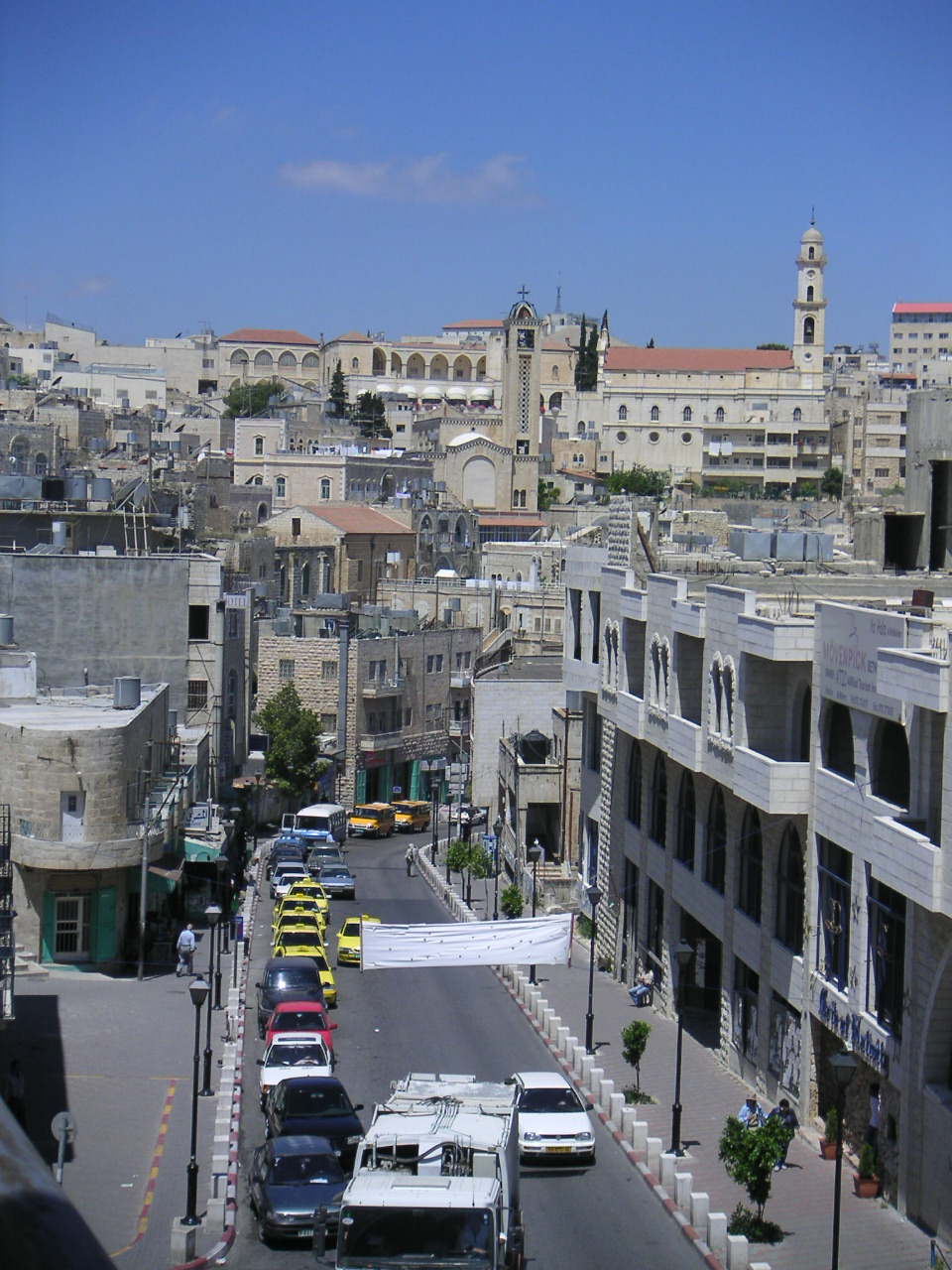
View of Bethlehem

In 2009, efforts continued to build Palestinian local institutions and governments from the ground up. Much of this work was done by Tony Blair and US General Keith Dayton. Some analysts saw this as a more substantial way to lay a groundwork for viable institutions and for local peace. In August 2009, a state of the art web-based system for tracking goods coming in and out of the area by Palestinian customs was launched in partnership with the United Nations Conference on Trade and Development.

In 2009, an economic "boom" began with growth reaching 8 percent, higher than in Israel or the West. However, with inflation around 9.9% that same year, real economic growth is actually negative insofar as purchasing power has decreased. Tourism to Bethlehem, which had doubled to 1 million in 2008, rose to nearly 1.5 million in 2009. New car imports increased by 44 percent. New shopping malls opened in Jenin and Nablus. As an outcome of the Palestine Investment Conference, Palestinian developers are planning to build the first modern Palestinian city, Rawabi.

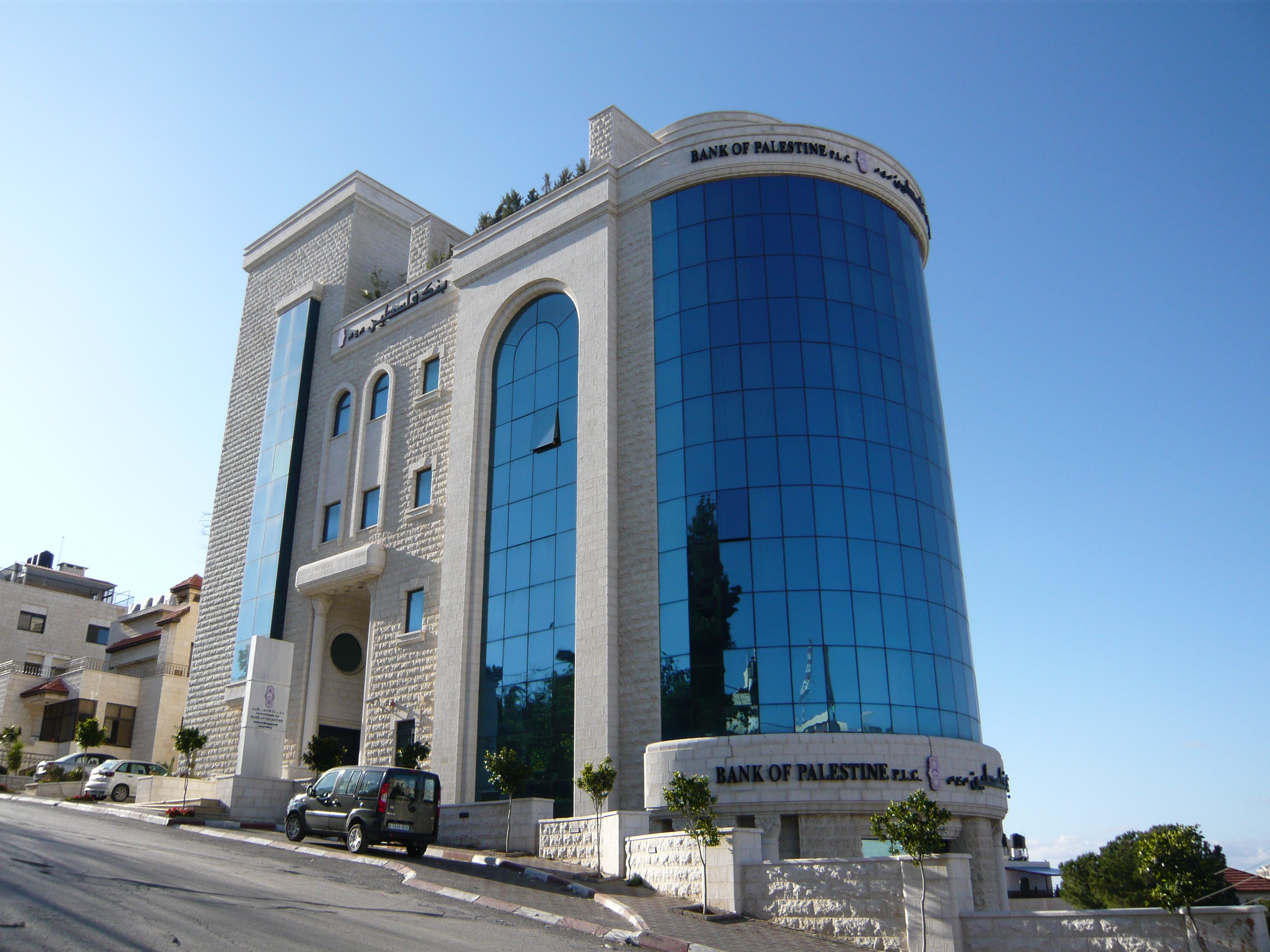
Bank of Palestine, Ramallah

In 2010, Ramallah was described as a hub of the economic activity thanks to improved security within the city, successful battle against corruption and large consumer base.

In 2011, the Palestinian Planning Minister said that GDP growth was expected to reach 9%, rising to 10% in 2012 and 12% in 2013.

=== East Jerusalem ===
East Jerusalem was once the business and shopping hub of the West Bank. However, since the advent of Israeli security checkpoints and the separation barrier starting over a decade ago, it has become isolated from its customer base leading to serious economic decline. According to Hanna Siniora of the Palestinian-American Chamber of Commerce, the turning point was 1993. He states that since then East Jerusalem has become a closed city through isolation from the rest of the West Bank causing a loss of 50% of its business between 1993 and 2001.

According to a 2012 report by the Association for Civil Rights in Israel and interviews conducted by the Forward, the decline of the economy in East Jerusalem has led to unprecedented levels of poverty, with 80% of the Palestinian population living below the poverty line. The main cause is seen as the political and physical barriers separating it from the rest of the West Bank. The ACRI report attributing the problem to "'the cumulative effects of annexation, neglect, rights violations and the completion of the separation barrier." Another contributing factor to the economic decline is the housing situation. The Israeli government has facilitated extensive construction for Israeli settler neighborhoods, but has severely restricted development and building for the Palestinian population.

=== Gaza Strip ===
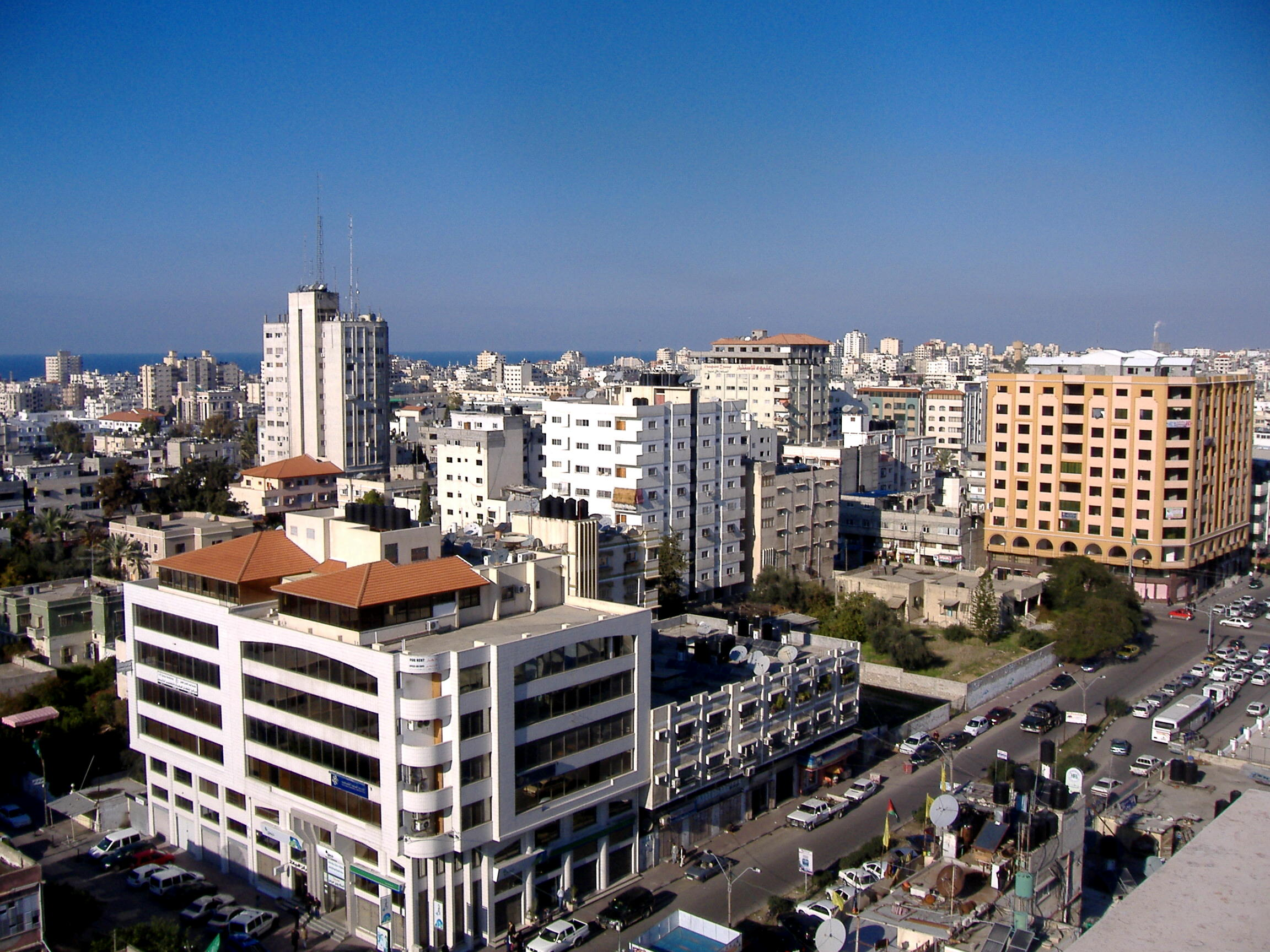
Gaza City

According to CIA's The World Factbook, Israel's closure policy, which was extended when the Hamas administration came to power in 2007, was responsible for high levels of poverty and unemployment and a significant decline of the private sector which was heavily reliant upon export markets. Israel blamed Hamas for taking actions that led to the closure policy. A large part of the population is dependent on humanitarian assistance, primarily from the UN agencies.

An easing of Israel's closure policy in 2010 resulted in an improvement in some economic indicators, but regular exports from the Gaza Strip were still prohibited. According to the Israel Defense Forces, the economy improved in 2011, with a drop in unemployment and an increase in GDP. New malls have opened, local industry is developing and the economic upswing has led to the construction of hotels and a rise in the import of cars. Wide-scale development has been made possible by the unhindered movement of goods into Gaza through the Kerem Shalom Crossing and tunnels between the Gaza Strip and Egypt. The current rate of trucks entering Gaza through Kerem Shalom is 250 trucks per day. This figure fluctuates depending on the level of interference with goods being brought into Gaza from Egypt through tunnels. The increase in building activity has led to a shortage of construction workers. To make up for the deficit, young people are being sent to learn the trade in Turkey. In 2022, 81.5% of Gaza's residents were living below the poverty line.

== Currency ==
Under the Protocol on Economic Relations, the Palestinians are not allowed to independently introduce a separate Palestinian currency. Instead, the Israeli new shekel is the main currency of the Palestinian territories. In the West Bank the Jordanian dinar is also used. The shekel is used for most transactions, especially retail, while the dinar is used more for savings and durable goods transactions. The United States dollar is also sometimes used for savings and for purchasing foreign goods. The dollar is used by the overwhelming majority of transactions overseen by the Palestinian Monetary Authority (that functions as Palestine's central bank), which only represent a fraction of the transactions conducted in Palestine or by Palestinians.

In the Gaza Strip, the shekel is also the main currency, though it is in short supply due to the blockade of the Gaza Strip by the PA, Israel and Egypt.

Because the Palestinian Monetary Authority does not issue its own currency, it is therefore unable to pursue an independent and effective monetary policy. At the same time, the use of multiple currencies increases the costs and creates inconvenience arising from fluctuating exchange rates.

== Taxation ==
Taxation in the Palestinian territories is a complex system which may involve payment to the Palestinian Authority (PA) and/or Israel. In 2005, the PA collected approximately $34 million per month from taxes and other charges, while Israel collected about $75 million per month in tariffs on foreign imports and value added taxes (VAT) on Israeli goods and services and on average retained about $15 million for the payment of water and power bills of Palestinians, while forwarding the other $60 million to the PA. Israeli collected funds account for about two-thirds of the PA's self-generated revenue, which Reuters put at $100 million in December 2012. Since the 2006 Palestinian legislative election and the formation of a Hamas government in the PA, Israel has regularly withheld the taxes it owes the PA.

== Employment ==
According to the Council for European Palestinian Relations, the agricultural sector formally employs 13.4% of the population and informally employs 90% of the population. Over the past 10 years, unemployment rates in Palestine have increased and the agricultural sector became the most impoverished sector in Palestine. Unemployment rates peaked in 2008 when they reached 41% in Gaza.

=== By Israelis ===
High unemployment in the Palestinian economy led about 100,000 Palestinians to work in Israel. By March 2014, about 45,000 permits were issued for work in Israel with further 25,000 issued for work in West Bank settlements. It is estimated 35,000 Palestinian work through illegal channels and without a permit. Recently the quota for permits has increased and minimum age for obtaining one was reduced from 26 to 24. Sectors in which Palestinians are employed include construction, manufacturing, commerce and agriculture.

As of 2013, average daily wages in Israel and the settlements is nearly 2.2 times higher than in the private sector in the West Bank and over 4 times that in Gaza. As of 2022, Palestinian monthly minimum wage is ₪1,450, almost a quarter of the Israeli minimum wage of ₪5,300. In the West Bank, Israeli labour laws are partially applied through military enactments, and a ruling of the Supreme Court of Israel of 2007 apply the law for work done inside Israeli settlements. Yet, there have been incidents where Israeli employers did not fulfill their legal obligations to the employees by refusing to provide a paycheck or hide the number of work hours to avoid labour laws such as minimum wage or social security benefits.

In 2014, an article published in the weekly economic supplement of Al-Hayat Al-Jadida, the Palestinian Authority's official daily, praised Israeli treatment of Palestinian workers. With having added benefits such as transportation, medical and pensions, Palestinians are quick to leave their Palestinian employers and work for Israelis, whenever they have the opportunity to do so. Safety rules are enforced strictly by Israeli Workers' Union and physical examinations are done by doctors. The PA has passed labour laws but do not enforce rules such as the minimum wage, annual vacations, sick leave or extra payments for overtime work.

== Foreign aid ==
In 2008, the West Bank and Gaza economies were heavily reliant on foreign aid which stood at 1.8 billion. Approximately 30% of the GDP, or US$487 per Palestinian per year came from aid. Foreign aid provided essential services for nearly half of the Palestinian people, and allowed the Palestinian Authority to operate and pay its estimated 140,000 employees.

In 2010, Arab states cut financial aid to the Palestinian Authority. According to the Palestinian Finance Ministry, the PA received $583.5 million in budget support by August 2010, of which only 22 percent came from Arab states. The remainder was from international donors, including the European Union and the United States. Salah Rafat, a member of the PLO Executive Committee, urged the Arab countries to honor their financial pledges.

In April 2011, Salam Fayyad met with Western donors in Brussels and requested $5 billion in aid.

As part of a 2013 effort to inspire peace talks between Israelis and Palestinians, US Secretary of State John Kerry proposed a $4 billion plan of private investment in the Palestinian economy. The plan was described as having the potential to significantly grow the economy of the West Bank, but no specifics were provided as to what projects were envisioned, who would invest the money, or what modifications might be required in Israel's restrictions on the West Bank for the plan to work. The proposal was coordinated in association with the Quartet, a Middle East peacemaking group comprising the United States, Russia, the European Union and the United Nations, for which former UK Prime Minister Tony Blair served as an envoy. The Palestinian Authority responded by indicating that it would not trade its political aspirations for economic aid, but was assured that the plan was meant as a complement to negotiations, and not as a substitute. Peace talks failed for unrelated reasons without any implementation of the proposal.

== Israeli–Palestinian relations ==
=== Commerce ===
Olives of Peace is a joint Israeli–Palestinian business venture to sell olive oil. Through this project, Israelis and Palestinians have carried out joint training sessions and planning. The oil is sold under the brand name "Olives of Peace." The two regions are planning a joint industrial zone which would bridge the border. Palestinians would produce locally made handicrafts and sell them through Gilboa to other regions of the world. Another possible project is a joint language center, where Israelis and Palestinians would teach each other Arabic and Hebrew, as well as aspects of their cultural heritage.

In 2011, bilateral trade between Israel and the Palestinian-ruled areas reached $4.3 billion, with Israeli exports to the PA amounting to $3.5 billion and Palestinian exports to Israel amounting to $816 million. According to Nader Tamimi, chair of the Association of Traditional Industries in the PA, there are regular interactions between Palestinian and Israeli businessmen.

At a conference hosted by the Faculty of Business and Management at Ben-Gurion University of the Negev in 2012, Israeli and Palestinian trade experts met to discuss ways of promoting cross-border business interactions.

In 2013, commercial trade between Israel and the Palestinian Authority were valued at US$20 billion annually. The continuously increasing transactions led to the creation of the joint Palestinian and Israeli initiative, the Jerusalem Arbitration Center (JAC). The center will specialize as an independent institution focusing on business arbitration between Israelis and Palestinians.

Due to the clearance crisis with Israel, the Palestinian economy was severely hit in terms of public finances, according to the World Bank's report in 2019. World Bank Acting Country Director for West Bank Gaza Anna Bjerde said, "The economy, which in 2018 saw no real growth, is now facing a severe fiscal shock because of the standoff over clearance revenue transfers." The report states, "Against a background of declining aid flows, the recent standoff stemmed from Israel’s unilateral deduction of US$138 million from the PA’s clearance revenues in 2019 to offset estimated payouts to Palestinian martyrs and prisoners' families."

=== Conflict ===
In 2006, the unity of the Palestinian economy was fractured following Fatah-Hamas split prompting Israel to sever direct ties between the West Bank and Gaza. The following war in 2008–2009 destroyed most of the economic infrastructure of the Gaza Strip and left the Palestinian economy without any remaining activity and $1.4 billion in debt. The Oslo Accords in 1993 aimed to prevent this, but was unable to keep the Palestinian economy from fluctuating. Currently, the Palestinian economy lives on foreign aid and customs revenue between Israel and Palestine. However, Israeli restrictions continue to hamper and fragment the Palestinian economy. By 2008, 71% of the Gaza Strip's population was unemployed. The import and export prosperity in Palestine was impacted by the border restrictions and constant Israeli control in the West Bank and Gaza, which also weakened the industrial and agricultural sectors. In order for the Palestinian economy to prosper, the restrictions on Palestinian land must be removed. In the West Bank, the Israeli restrictions caused the Palestinian economy to lose $3.4bn (35% of the annual GDP), according to The Guardian and a World Bank report.

Unemployment in Gaza and the West Bank	2000	2001	2002	2003	2004	2005	2006	2007	2008
Percentage	12.5%	21%	32%	26%	27.5%	24.5%	23%	21.5%	26.5%

== Economic statistics ==
Exports of Palestine by product category (2019) Chemical products Transportation Machines Mineral products Plastics and rubbers Metals Foodstuffs Precious metals Textiles Instruments Animal products Vegetable products Paper goods Footwear and headwear Miscellaneous Stone and glass Wood products Animal and vegetable bi-products Animal hides Arts and antiques Weapons

The following table shows the main economic indicators in 1994–2023. Inflation below 5% is in green.

Year	GDP (in bn. US$PPP)	GDP per capita (in US$ PPP)	GDP (in bn. US$ nominal)	GDP per capita (in US$ nominal)	GDP growth (real)	Inflation rate (in Percent)	Unemployment (in Percent)	Government debt (in % of GDP)
1994	5.85	2,524	2.84	1,227	n/a	n/a	18.6%	n/a
1995	▲6.40	▲2,575	▲3.28	▲1,322	▲7.1%	n/a	▲18.7%	n/a
1996	▲6.59	▼2,506	▲3.41	▼1,296	▲1.2%	n/a	▲23.5%	n/a
1997	▲7.69	▲2,763	▲3.76	▲1,351	▲14.7%	▲7.6%	▼20.1%	n/a
1998	▲8.89	▲3,096	▲4.07	▲1,417	▲14.3%	▲5.6%	▼14.2%	n/a
1999	▲9.76	▲3,295	▲4.27	▲1,442	▲8.3%	▲5.5%	▼11.8%	n/a
2000	▼9.13	▼2,990	▲4.31	▼1,413	▼−8.6%	▲2.8%	▲14.3%	20.0%
2001	▼8.47	▼2,697	▼4.00	▼1,276	▼−9.3%	▲1.2%	▲25.3%	▲22.2%
2002	▼7.52	▼2,333	▼3.56	▼1,103	▼−12.5%	▲5.7%	▲31.2%	▼20.9%
2003	▲8.75	▲2,639	▲3.97	▲1,197	▲14.0%	▲4.4%	▼25.5%	▼20.7%
2004	▲10.95	▲3,214	▲4.60	▲1,351	▲21.9%	▲3.0%	▲26.8%	▲21.1%
2005	▲12.57	▲3,583	▲5.13	▲1,461	▲11.3%	▲5.3%	▼23.5%	▲24.0%
2006	▲12.83	▼3,552	▲5.35	▲1,481	▼−1.0%	▲3.8%	▲23.7%	▼19.3%
2007	▲13.68	▲3,677	▲5.82	▲1,564	▲3.8%	▲1.9%	▼21.7%	▲23.7%
2008	▲14.97	▲3,919	▲7.31	▲1,913	▲7.4%	▲9.9%	▲26.6%	▼23.0%
2009	▲16.36	▲4,171	▲8.09	▲2,062	▲8.6%	▲2.8%	▼24.5%	▲24.0%
2010	▲17.52	▲4,354	▲9.68	▲2,406	▲5.8%	▲3.8%	▼23.7%	▼22.7%
2011	▲19.59	▲4,750	▲11.19	▲2,712	▲9.6%	▲2.9%	▼20.9%	▲26.3%
2012	▲21.18	▲5,010	▲12.21	▲2,889	▲6.1%	▲2.8%	▲23.0%	▲29.8%
2013	▲22.55	▲5,210	▲13.52	▲3,123	▲4.7%	▲1.7%	▲23.4%	▲30.2%
2014	▲22.91	▼5,171	▲13.99	▲3,159	▼−0.2%	▲1.7%	▲26.9%	▲34.0%
2015	▲23.98	▲5,293	▲13.97	▼3,084	▲3.7%	▲1.4%	▼25.9%	▲37.1%
2016	▲26.35	▲5,689	▲15.41	▲3,326	▲8.9%	▼−0.2%	▲26.9%	▼31.0%
2017	▲27.20	▲5,747	▲16.13	▲3,407	▲1.4%	▲0.2%	▼25.5%	▲31.8%
2018	▲28.40	▲5,851	▲16.28	▼3,353	▲1.2%	▼−0.2%	▲26.3%	▲33.1%
2019	▲30.49	▲6,127	▲17.13	▲3,443	▲1.4%	▲1.6%	▼25.4%	▲34.5%
2020	▼28.61	▼5,608	▼15.53	▼3,045	▼−11.3%	▼−0.7%	▲25.9%	▲47.1%
2021	▼27.88	▼5,333	▲18.11	▲3,464	▲7.0%	▲1.2%	▲26.4%	▲50.2%
2022	▲31.09	▲5,805	▲19.17	▲3,579	▲4.1%	▲3.7%	▼24.4%	▼47.1%
2023	▼30.46	▼5,562	▼17.42	▼3,181	▼−5.4%	▲5.9%	n/a	49.7%

== See also ==
- Blockade of the Gaza Strip
- List of banks in Palestine
