= Energy in Palestine =

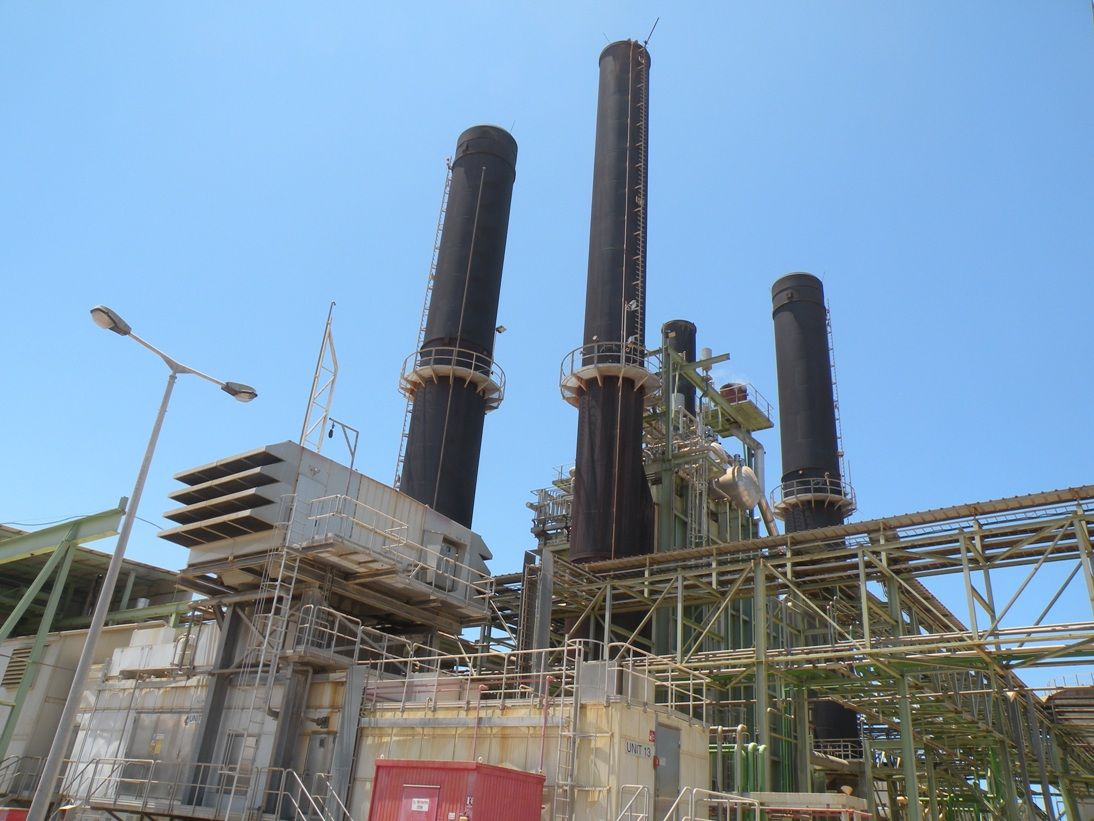
Gaza Power Plant is operated by the Palestine Electric Corporation.

Palestine produces no oil or natural gas, and is predominantly dependent on the Israel Electric Corporation (IEC) for electricity. Between 2000 and 2023, Palestine’s energy consumption grew from 6TWh to 24TWh. In the same period, generation of energy in Palestine grew from 0.03TWh (approximately 0.5% of consumption) to 1.02TWh (4%). The only domestic source of energy is the disputed Gaza Marine gas field, which has not yet been developed. According to UNCTAD, the Palestinian Territory "lies above sizeable reservoirs of oil and natural gas wealth" but "occupation continues to prevent Palestinians from developing their energy fields so as to exploit and benefit from such assets." In 2012, electricity available in the West Bank and Gaza was 5,370 GW-hour (3,700 in the West Bank and 1,670 in Gaza), while the annual per capita consumption of electricity (after deducting transmission loss) was 950 kWh. National sources only produce 445 GWh of electricity, supplying less than 10% of demand.

The Palestinian Electricity Transmission Company (PETL), formed in 2013, is currently the sole buyer of electricity in the areas under Palestinian Authority (PA) control. It buys electricity from the Palestine Power Generation Company (PPGC), IEC, and other neighboring countries, which is then distributed to the six Palestinian district electricity distribution companies.

Structurally, Palestine does not have sufficient distribution companies or systems. This problem leads to constraints on electricity efficiency. The West Bank and the Gaza Strip receive and consume energy in different ways.

== Petroleum ==
Almost all liquid fuel used in the Palestinian territories is supplied by or via Israel. The supply of petroleum is centrally located at two different terminals in the West Bank and one terminal at the Israel–Gaza barrier, at the Kerem Shalom crossing. These terminals do not have storage capacity for petroleum, which must therefore be used daily.

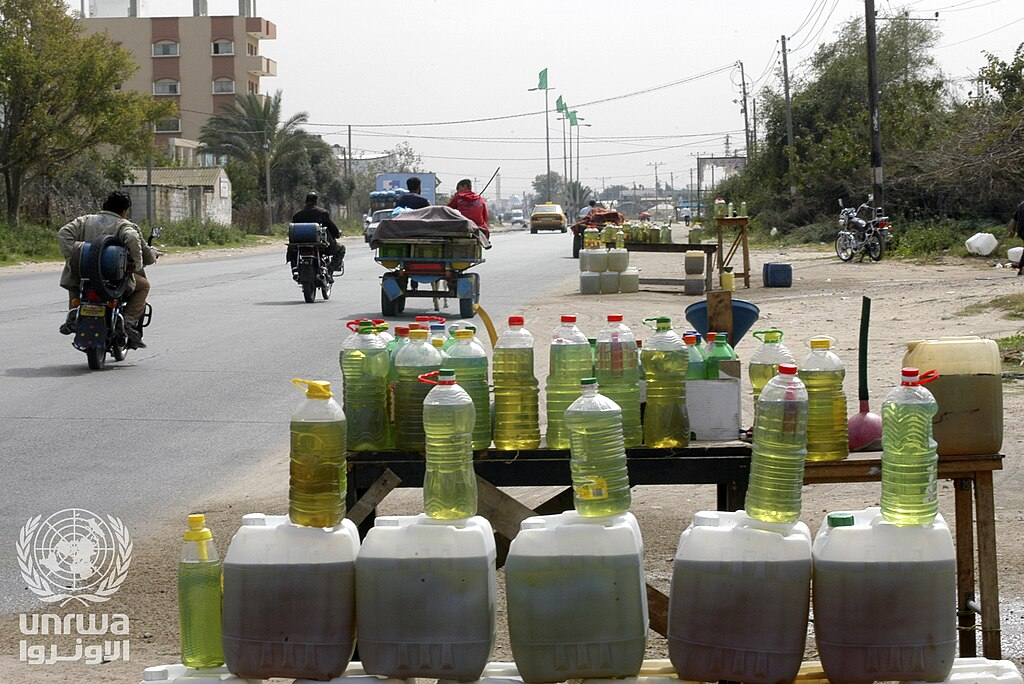
During the blockade of the Gaza Strip fuel has been smuggled in through tunnels.

In the case of Gaza, imported fuel is required to power the Gaza power plant, as well as for transportation and generators. The diesel fuel has been exempted from the blockade of the Gaza Strip, with some limitations, which has been in place since 2007.

In 2011, Hamas began buying cheaper fuel from Egypt, bringing it via a network of tunnels, and refused to buy it from Israel.

In early 2012, disagreement between the Palestinian Authority and Hamas led to Egypt reducing supplies of fuel being smuggled through the tunnels, while Hamas continued to refuse to accept fuel from or via Israel. Egypt attempted to stop the use of tunnels for delivery of Egyptian fuel purchased by Palestinian authorities, and severely reduced supply through the tunnel network. As the crisis deepened, Hamas wanted fuel to be imported from Egypt with the Rafah terminal between Egypt and Gaza being equipped for fuel transfer, and refused to accept fuel delivered via Kerem Shalom. This proposal was inconsistent with Egypt's agreement with Israel and the PA.

In mid-February, the crisis escalated and Hamas rejected an Egyptian proposal to bring in fuel via Kerem Shalom. Ahmed Abu Al-Amreen of the Hamas-run Energy Authority refused it on the grounds that Kerem Shalom is operated by Israel. Egypt could not ship diesel fuel to Gaza through the Rafah crossing, which is limited to the movement of individuals.

In early March, the head of Gaza's Energy Authority again insisted that Egypt transfer fuel through Rafah, although this crossing was not equipped to handle the 500,000 litres needed each day. In late March, Egypt agreed to provide 600,000 litres of fuel to Gaza daily, but it had no way of delivering it to which Hamas would agree.

Israel permitted the entry of the normal diesel for hospitals, and also shipped 150,000 litres of diesel through Kerem Shalom, which was paid for by the Red Cross. In April 2012, the PA and Hamas reached a deal, with the involvement of the Red Cross, for the transfer of fuel via Kerem Shalom, with the fuel being accepted by the PA, which was then transferred to Hamas after Hamas made payment to the PA.

== Electricity generation ==
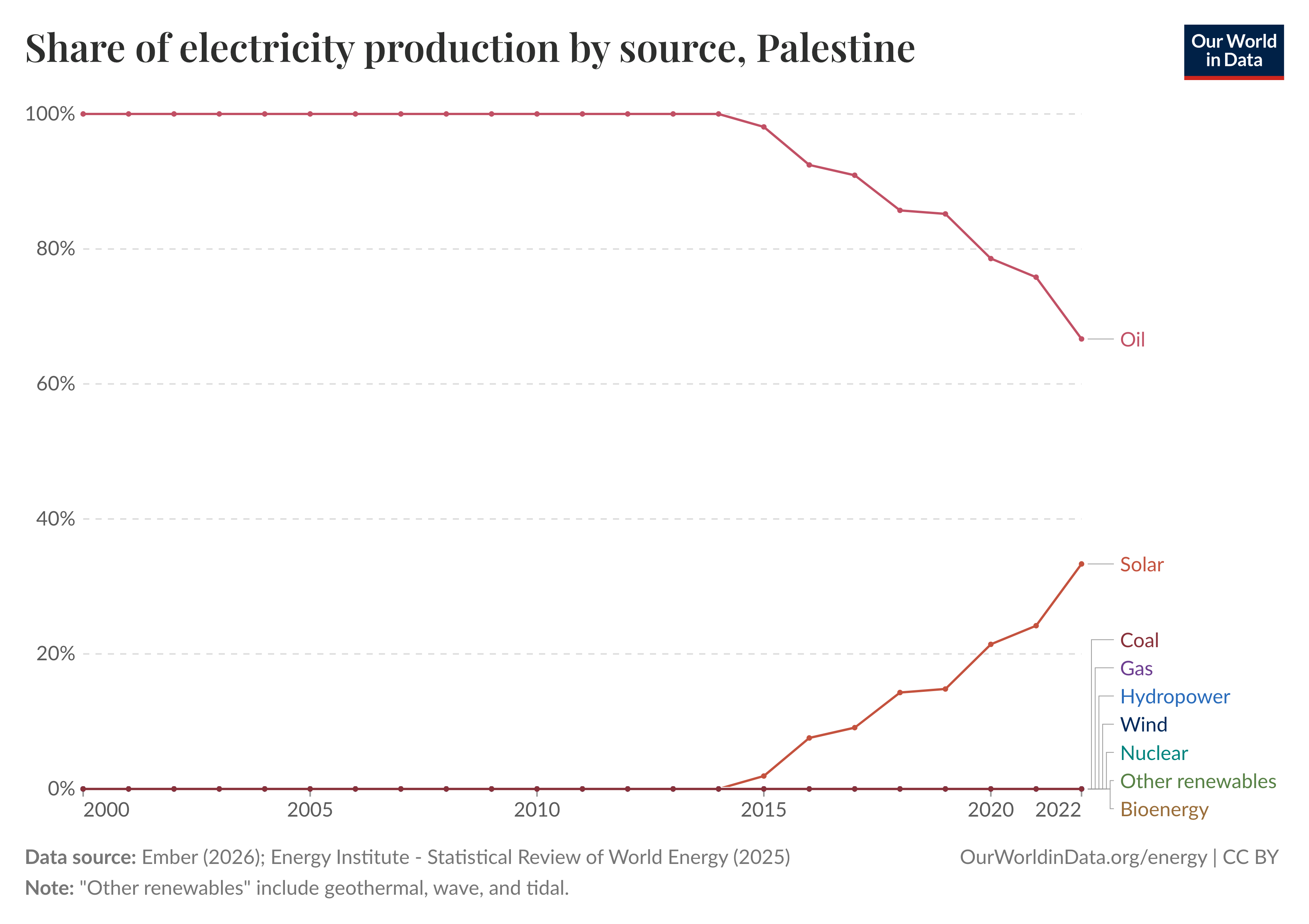
Palestine electricity production sources, 2000 to 2022

In 1999, Palestine Electric Company (PEC) was formed in the Palestinian territories as a subsidiary of Palestine Power Company LLC to establish electricity generating plants in territories under PA control.

In 2010, PADICO Holdings, PEC and other Palestinian companies formed the Palestine Power Generation Company (PPGC) to build power plants in areas under PA control, and to reduce Palestinian dependence on imported energy.

According to a study published in 2019, about three-quarters of Gaza's electricity was imported (66.6% from Israel and 8.5% from Egypt) and the remainder was generated at the Gaza Power Plant.

=== Gaza power plant ===
The Gaza Power Plant is the only power plant in the Gaza Strip. It is owned by Gaza Power Generating Company (GPGC), a subsidiary of the Palestine Electric Company (PEC). It is located on Salaheddin Road and relies on diesel fuel imported via Israel.

Following the Hamas takeover of Gaza in 2007, the Gaza Strip has been subject to a blockade, though fuel for the Gaza power plant has been exempted in normal circumstances, as had electricity supplies. Development of the energy sector in Gaza ceased, while Gaza faced increasing demand from a growing population. During past military offensives, Israeli targets included energy infrastructure in the Gaza Strip. In late October 2007, in response to persistent rocket fire on southern Israel, Israel cut diesel exports to Gaza by 15% and gasoline exports by 10%, and created targeted electrical outages of 15 minutes after a rocket attack.

Until June 2013, diesel fuel required as fuel for the power plant was smuggled from Egypt, where fuel at the time was highly subsidized. Egypt took measures against the Gaza Strip smuggling tunnels, halting these cheap imports. With a halt to such smuggling and with restricted amounts of fuel supplied via Israel the power plant began operating at partial capacity.

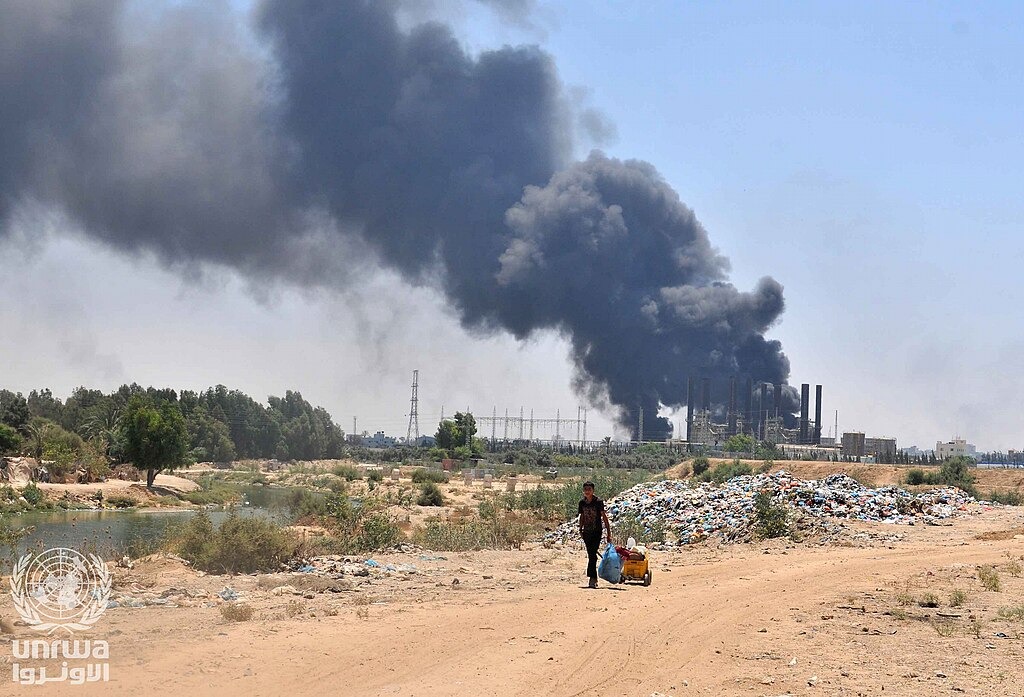
The plant in 2014 after being attacked by the IDF

The Gaza power plant's main fuel tanks were hit by an Israeli tank shell in the 2014 Gaza War, setting about 3 million cubic liters of fuel on fire. Originally reported as destroyed and facing a year of repairs, the plant returned to operation in six weeks.

In 2016, Qatar provided fuel for the Gaza power plant. PA President Abbas objected to the arrangement because the PA would be unable to collect taxes on the fuel.

In August 2019, following three rockets being fired from the Gaza Strip, Israel cut by half the amount of fuel it supplied to Gaza's power plant. Before the cut, residents had six hours of electricity followed by 12 hours of blackout, and it was said that the cut would result in a decrease of power time to four-hour periods.

In August 2020, following the launching of incendiary balloons from the Gaza Strip that caused brush fires in southern Israel, Israel suspended fuel shipments to the Gaza Strip, resulting in the shutting down of the Gaza power plant within a week. In September 2020, Qatar brokered a ceasefire between Israel and Hamas that is reported to include "plans to build a power station operated by Qatar." For the 2021 year, and perhaps in earlier years, Qatar has been paying for fuel for Gaza's power plant. Transfers of fuel for the power plant were stopped by Israel during the Gaza War in May 2021 and resumed by the end of June.

Before the Gaza war that began in October 2023, the Gaza Strip's energy needs were about 600MW. The Gaza Power Plant produced 60MW and imported energy from Israel accounted for 120MW. Israel cut off power to the Strip as part of a total blockade. The Gaza Power Plant ran out of fuel days into the war and remained inactive. Energy from Israel powered a waste treatment and desalination plant in Gaza until March 2025 when Eli Cohen, Israel's Minister of Energy, instructed the IEC not to supply power in order to pressure Hamas. By November 2025, during a ceasefire, Gaza's energy infrastructure was badly damaged and most Palestinians were without electricity and relied on charging points running on private generators or solar power.

=== Jenin power plant ===
The PA approved PPGC's proposal for the construction of the Jenin power plant in the north of the West Bank. PPGC has acquired around 148,300 m2 of land for the project in Jalamah, Jenin Governorate. The Jenin power plant is planned as a gas fired power plant with a generation capacity of approximately 450 megawatts, supplied by natural gas from the Gaza Marine gas field. Power generation from the plant is expected to commence at the end of 2023. The power plant is expected to provide around 40% of Palestine's annual electricity needs in both the West Bank and Gaza Strip, with a total annual production capacity of around 3,700 GWh. The PA has granted Palestinian Electricity Company an exclusive right to generate electricity in the Gaza Strip and sell it to PA owned or managed institutions for 20 years, which may be extended for a maximum of two consecutive five-year terms. The electricity produced in the Jenin Power Plant will be sold to PETL.

=== Renewable energy ===
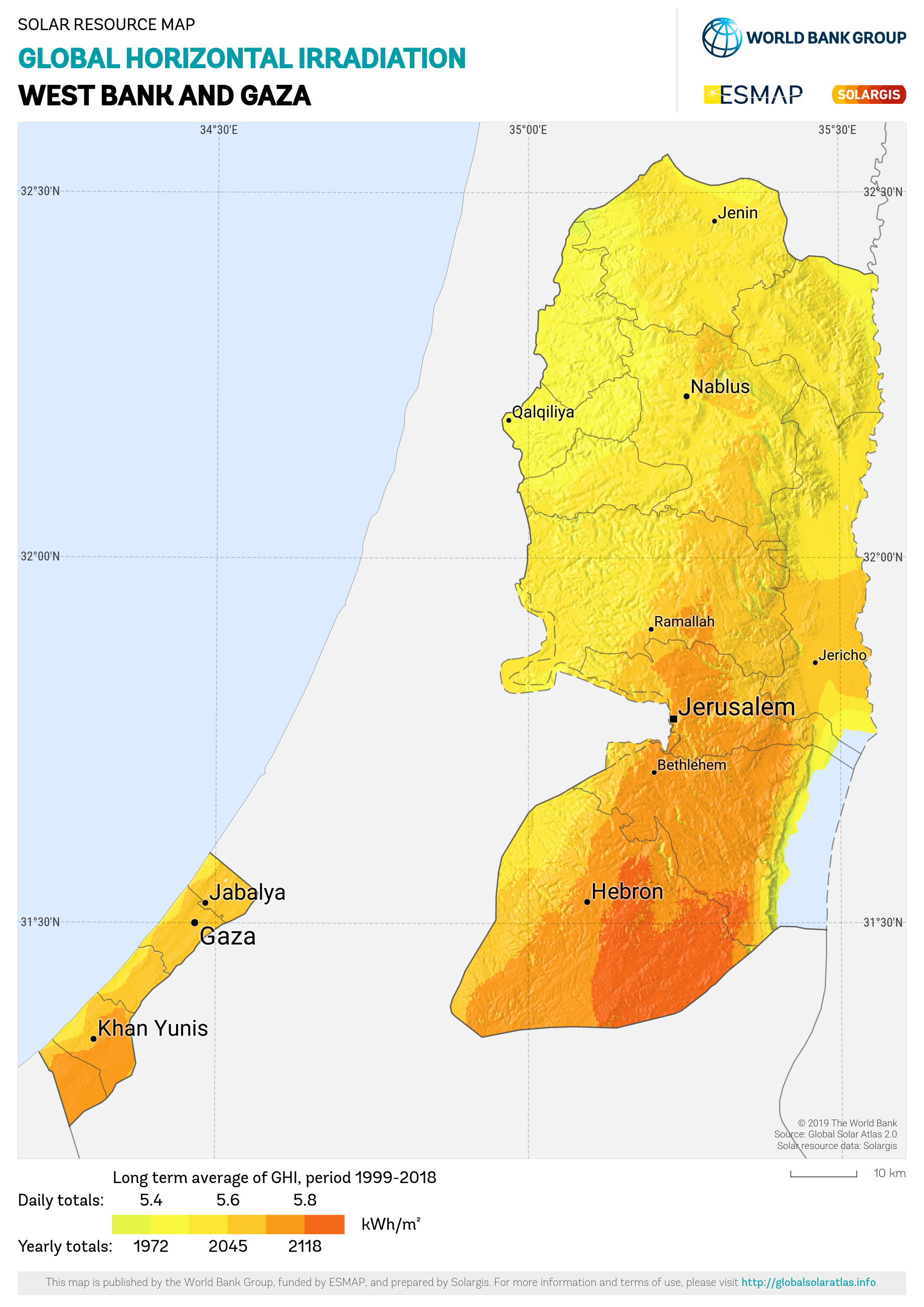
Solar potential of Palestine

In 2018 the PA and the World Bank began an initiative to increase the amount of energy produced through solar panels.

=== Gaza electricity crisis ===
As of 2017, Gaza's normal energy needs were estimated to be approximately 400-600 megawatts (MW) for full 24-hour supply to all residents. Gaza's electricity is normally supplied by its sole diesel power plant, which has a nominal rating of 60-140 MW (figures vary due to degree of operation and damage to the plant) and which is reliant on crude diesel fuel, which is imported via Israel. An additional 125 MW is supplied by Israel via 10 power lines, and 27 MW is supplied by Egypt. Even in normal conditions, the current rated supply of Gaza is inadequate to meet Gaza's growing needs.

The Gaza electricity crisis is a result of the tensions between Hamas, which rules the Gaza Strip, and the Fatah-controlled Palestinian Authority, which rules in the West Bank, over custom tax revenue, funding of the Gaza Strip, and political authority. Residents of the Gaza Strip receive electricity for a few hours a day on a rolling blackout basis. As a result of the crises the Gaza power plant has reduced and then ceased operations due to a lack of fuel, and the amount of imported electricity from Israel and Egypt has also been reduced.

Because of the unpredictability of the power supply, some Gazans and government institutions use private electric generators, solar panels and uninterruptible power supply units to produce power when regular power is not available. These alternative power sources depend on the availability of fuel.

Following the outbreak of the Gaza war in October 2023, Israel cut power supplies to Gaza. The only power station in Gaza ran out of fuel, and by March 2024 64.8% of the solar panels installed in the Gaza Strip had been damaged by the war. A 2025 assessment of the impact of the war suggested the damage to energy infrastructure in Gaza would cost over $494 million.

== Electricity imports ==
The Israel Electric Corporation (IEC) supplies most of the electricity in the Palestinian territories. PETL is the sole buyer of imported electricity for distribution in West Bank Areas A and B and in the Gaza Strip, which in turn supplies the electricity to the six Palestinian distribution companies. In West Bank Area C, including the settlements, IEC supplies the electricity directly.

In normal circumstances, IEC supplied 125 MW of electricity to the Gaza Strip via ten high voltage power lines, which has been exempt from the blockade of the Gaza Strip, with some limitations. PETL also buys 27 MW of electricity from Egypt for distribution in the Gaza Strip, though the supply from Egypt is considered unreliable. In May 2021, during the 2021 Israel–Palestine crisis, errant rockets fired by Hamas from the Gaza Strip at Israel damaged five of the ten power lines that supply electricity from Israel to the Gaza Strip, severely reducing the electricity supply. At the time, IEC stated that it could not repair the lines, and after the fighting ceased the IEC workers union released a statement refusing to repair the facilities until Israeli prisoners of Hamas (including Avera Mengistu and the bodies of Hadar Goldin and Oron Shaul) were returned.

In the West Bank, PETL buys around 5% of electricity from Jordan Electric Power Company (JEPCO) to distribute only in the Jericho Governorate.

== Electricity transmission ==
The Palestinian Electricity Transmission Company (PETL) was formed in 2013, and is currently the sole buyer of electricity in the Palestinian territories, though it effectively operates only in West Bank Areas A and B, where it buys electricity from IEC and some from Jordan. IEC distributes electricity in West Bank Area C.

A power substation located outside Jenin has been operating since July 2017 by PEC, and is capable of providing up to 135 MW, which is purchased by the IEC to supply the northern West Bank. In October 2020, Israel transferred control over another three power substations in the West Bank to the PA. The three substations were built by IEC and financed by the European Investment Bank. Two of the substations are managed by PETL, while the third is managed by JDECO.

PETL distributes electricity to the five Palestinian district electricity distribution companies operating in West Bank Areas A and B, that in turn distribute to customers in their respective licence areas.

== Electricity distribution ==
There are six electricity distribution companies that have been licensed by the Palestinian Authority to distribute electricity to customers within their respective exclusive concession areas. Five are in West Bank Areas A and B: Jerusalem District Electricity Company (JDECO); North Electricity Distribution Company (NEDCO), which covers Nablus and the Jenin area, and Toubas Electricity Distribution Company (TEDCO), which serve the northern parts of the West Bank; and Hebron Electric Power Company (HEPCO) and Southern Electric Company (SELCO), which serve the southern parts of the West Bank. Gaza Electricity Distribution Company (GEDCO) is the sole electricity distributor in the Gaza Strip. IEC distributes electricity in West Bank Area C.

JDECO is the largest and the oldest electricity distributor in the West Bank, existing from the period of the Jordanian rule of the West Bank. JDECO's licence area covers the East Jerusalem, Bethlehem, Ramallah and Jericho areas. JDECO also buys about 5% of its electricity from Jordan's JEPCO, which is only used in the Jericho district. JDECO supplies electricity to 30% of households in the West Bank and East Jerusalem. JDECO's activities in East Jerusalem are regulated by the Israel Electricity Authority, and in the West Bank by the Palestinian Authority (PA) or, in some cases, by the Israeli Civil Administration.

== History ==
After the 1967 occupation of the West Bank, agreements to distribute electricity to the West Bank from Jordan were terminated by the Israeli Military Governorate. Order 389 of 1970 vested the governance of the natural resources sector in an authority to be appointed by the military commander. The Israeli Civil Administration had the authority to supply electricity to the Israeli settlements, such as Kiryat Arba. The IEC was authorized to supply and sell electricity to the Hebron municipality. By 1980, the IEC held a concession for all of the power supply in the West Bank.

In 1994, with the signing of the Oslo Accords, the Palestinian Authority became responsible for civil matters in West Bank Areas A and B, but not Area C, and the Gaza Strip.

In 1999, Palestine Electric Company (PEC) was formed in the Palestinian territories as a subsidiary of Palestine Power Company LLC. PEC shares were listed in the Palestine Exchange in 2004, where 33% of its shares are owned by public shareholders and 67% owned by founding companies. The main objectives of PEC are to establish electricity generating plants in the territories of the Palestinian Authority (PA) and to carry out all the operations necessary for the production and generation of electricity. In 2010, PADICO Holdings, PEC and other Palestinian companies formed the Palestine Power Generation Company (PPGC) to build power plants in areas under PA control, and to reduce Palestinian dependence on imported energy.

In 1999, BG Group was granted an exploration licence by the PA, and in 2000 the company discovered natural gas about 36 kilometres (22 mi) offshore in the Mediterranean Sea in the Gaza Marine gas field. As of 2021, exploitation of the gas field is still subject to negotiations.

Between 2000 and 2023 Palestine’s energy consumption grew from 6TWh to 24TWh. In the same period, generation of energy in Palestine grew from 0.03TWh (approximately 0.5% of consumption) to 1.02TWh (4%).

== Debt to IEC ==
Israel Electric Corporation (IEC) sells electricity to Jerusalem District Electricity Company (JDECO) and to the Palestinian Authority, which on-sells them to the other four Palestinian district electricity distribution companies in the West Bank and to Gaza Electricity Distribution Company (GEDCO) in the Gaza Strip. The distributors provide electricity to customers in their respective licence areas of West Bank Areas A and B and the Gaza Strip. The distributors depend on their customers paying their bills to enable the distributors to pay IEC or the PA for the electricity supplied. The director of Northern Electric, for example, has been urging its customers to pay their bills. The majority of the debt to IEC is owed by the PA and JDECO. IEC said that it was losing ILS 85 million per month on power being supplied to Nablus and Jenin that was not being paid for, causing the majority of its quarterly loss. JDECO, for example, in 2012, owed IEC ILS 458 million.

In February 2015, the PA and the Palestinian electricity distributors owed IEC a total of ILS 1.9 billion (about US$500 million). On 23 February, after numerous notices, IEC cut power to several West Bank cities for about 45 minutes. Two days later it again cut power, saying it was a warning to the PA to begin paying down the debt. The Palestinians accused Israel and IEC of collective punishment, while IEC said it must operate independently of government and was treating the Palestinian electricity distributors as it would any customer who did not pay its bills.

In March 2016, the debts stood at ILS 1.7 billion (about US$460 million). On 31 March, IEC cut power in the Jericho area, on 4 April in the Bethlehem area, and on the following day in the Hebron area. On 6 April, IEC restored full power to the West Bank after it received a ILS 20 million payment, and an agreement to provide a full debt repayment schedule within seven days.

In April 2017, the PA told IEC that it would only pay ILS 25 million of the ILS 40 million monthly bill for Gaza and instructed IEC to reduce supply in the Strip. IEC reduced supplies to Gaza in May and June 2017, saying the dispute between Hamas and the PA was an internal Palestinian matter.

In May 2018, PETL agreed to repay PA's debt of almost ILS 1 billion. In June 2019, the debts stood at ILS 2.0 billion (about US$540 million), and the PA stopped all payments to IEC. In August 2019, with PA agreement, ILS 300 million was deducted from taxes that had been withheld by Israel for the PA and applied against the IEC debt.

On 8 September 2019, the debt was ILS 1.7 billion (about US$460 million) and IEC gave notice of its intention to cut power. Two months earlier the Supreme Court of Israel ruled that IEC must give 35 days notice before it can cut off electricity. On 28 December 2019, IEC started sporadic, three-hour power cuts in JDECO areas, to press for payment of some $519 million owed by JDECO. In January 2020, power cuts stopped after JDECO paid ILS 740 million ($214.21 million).

== See also ==
- Gaza Marine
- Gaza electricity crisis
- Blockade of the Gaza Strip
- Israel Electric Corporation
- Jerusalem District Electricity Company
