= International Investment Agreements of the State of Palestine =

The State of Palestine has concluded the following Bilateral Investment Treaties (BITs), Treaties with Investment Provisions (TIPs) and Investment Related Instruments (IRIs) according to the database of UNCTAD.

== Bilateral Investment Treaties ==
No.	Short title	Status	Parties	Date of signature	Date of entry into force
1	Turkey - State of Palestine BIT (2018)	Signed (not in force)	Türkiye	05/09/2018	
2	State of Palestine - Russian Federation BIT (2016)	In force	Russian Federation	11/11/2016	08/11/2017
3	Jordan - State of Palestine BIT (2012)	Signed (not in force)	Jordan	04/10/2012	
4	Germany - State of Palestine BIT (2000)	In force	Germany	10/07/2000	19/09/2008
5	Egypt - State of Palestine BIT (1998)	In force	Egypt	28/04/1998	19/06/1999

== Treaties with Investment Provisions ==
No.	Short title	Status	Parties	Date of signature	Date of entry into force
1	Palestine - United Kingdom Interim Political, Trade and Partnership Agreement (2019)	In force	United Kingdom	18/02/2019	01/01/2021
2	Palestine - Turkey FTA (2004)	In force	Türkiye	20/07/2004	01/06/2005
3	EFTA - Palestine Interim Agreement (1998)	In force	EFTA (European Free Trade Association)	30/11/1998	01/07/1999
4	EC - Palestine Association Agreement (1997)	In force	EU (European Union)	17/02/1997	01/07/1997
5	OIC Investment Agreement (1981)	In force		05/06/1981	02-1988
6	Arab Investment Agreement (1980)	In force		26/11/1980	07/09/1981
7	Arab League Investment Agreement (1970)	In force		29/08/1970	29/08/1970

== Investment Related Instruments ==
No.	Short title	Date of adoption	Level	Type
1	Islamic Corporation for the Insurance of Investment Credit	1992	Regional/Plurilateral	Intergovernmental agreements
2	Inter-Arab Investment Guarantee Corporation	1971	Regional/Plurilateral	Intergovernmental agreements
3	New York Convention	1958	Multilateral	Intergovernmental agreements

== See also ==
- Foreign relations of the State of Palestine
- Economy of the State of Palestine
