= Durapolist =

In industrial organization and in particular monopoly theory, a durapolist or durable good monopolist is a producer that manipulates the durability of its product. The term was coined by antitrust scholar Barak Orbach. The concept is used to explain how durable good manufacturers overcome the durability problem of their products and persuade consumers to purchase new goods. The concept utilizes a monopolist to simplify explanations regarding product durability.

== Overview ==
Once a durable-good manufacturer sells a product to a consumer, it faces a challenge to convince this consumer to purchase another good. A consumer needs one refrigerator, one razor, a limited number of shirts, and so forth. Durability, therefore, may mean limited prospects for businesses. Ronald Coase argued that because of the durability problem a durable-good monopolist may not be able to exploit its market position and charge monopolistic prices. His thesis is known as the Coase Conjecture. The durability problem is not limited to "monopolists" in the strict sense of the term. It may happen in all markets for durable goods, although it is easier to understand it with a single seller.

To overcome the durability problem, durable good manufacturers must persuade consumers to replace functioning products with new ones or to pay them money in other ways. Replacement of functioning goods refers to business strategies that persuade or force consumers to purchase new products. One category of strategies is contrived durability that refers to product design that intentionally shortens the product lifetime before it is released onto the market. In most instances, durability is built into a product by the manufacturer through its choices of inputs and production procedures. Another category of strategies refers is planned obsolescence that refers to shortening the lifetime of a product after it is released onto the market. Under this strategy, the manufacturer “convinces” the consumer to replace an old product with a new one, thereby rendering the lifetime of the old product shorter than its actual useful lifetime. Annual style changes of cars and revised editions of textbooks are prime examples of planned obsolescence. Although contrived durability and planned obsolescence are different in many ways, they are often confused.

Another strategy that is frequently used by durapolists is tying: a sale (or lease) of one product or service on condition that the buyer (or the lessee) take another product or service. Durable-good manufacturers tie to their durables non-durables and can boost profit. Razor and blades is favorite example. Durable-good manufacturers also use financing strategies (leasing, complex payment terms) to extract payments from consumers.

== See also ==
- Pacman conjecture
