= Electricity crisis in the Gaza Strip =

2023 energy crisis in Gaza

The electricity crisis in the Gaza Strip is an ongoing and growing electricity crisis faced by nearly two million residents of the Gaza Strip, with regular power supply being provided only for a few hours a day on a rolling blackout schedule. Some Gazans and government institutions use private electric generators, solar panels and uninterruptible power supply units to produce power when regular power is not available.

The crisis is predominantly the result of tensions between Hamas, which has ruled Gaza since June 2007, and the Palestinian Authority (PA) and Fatah, which rules in the West Bank, over custom tax revenue, funding of Gaza, and political authority. The Hamas government in Gaza has been reliant on the PA to help provide electricity in Gaza, with import duties on Gaza's fuel purchased via Israel being collected by Israel, as per Protocol on Economic Relations, which are passed to the PA, which pays the bills to Israel and Egypt for the electricity they supply to Gaza. In April 2017, the PA ceased paying the electricity bills issued by Israel Electric Corporation (IEC) and by Egypt. This decision was reversed in January 2018.

During the early stages of the Gaza war, Israel shut off the supply of electricity to Gaza. The sole remaining power station as the main supplier ran out of fuel on 11 October 2023.

== History ==
Until June 2013, diesel fuel for the power plant was smuggled from Egypt, where fuel at the time was highly subsidized. Egypt took measures against the Gaza Strip smuggling tunnels, halting these cheap imports. With a halt to such smuggling and with restricted amounts of fuel supplied via Israel, due to the Israeli blockade of the Gaza Strip, the power plant began operating at partial capacity. The supply of electricity by IEC was not subject to the blockade, and the supply from Egypt was unreliable.

During the 2014 Gaza War, the Gaza Power Plant was hit several times by Israeli shelling. Its fire extinguishing systems were struck and its fuel tanks were set ablaze. By 2015, the plant had undergone some basic repairs and relied on one small fuel tank to operate. The blockade renders maintenance and importing parts very difficult, and limits fuel imports.

=== Power crisis of 2017 ===
On 16 April 2017, the Gaza power plant closed after fuel supplied by Qatar and Turkey ran out. Hamas blamed the PA for the crisis by not passing tax revenues to Gaza, while the PA claimed that Hamas officials in Gaza were simply incapable of running the plant efficiently. As at 25 April 2017, all power lines from Egypt to Gaza were down. The electricity supplied by IEC was the only electricity available in the Gaza Strip.

In April 2017, the PA told IEC that it would only pay ILS 25 million of the ILS 40 million monthly bill for Gaza and instructed IEC to reduce supply. IEC reduced supplies to Gaza in May and June 2017, saying the dispute was an internal Palestinian matter. PA President Mahmoud Abbas was seen as seeking to ramp up pressure on Hamas. The Israeli military and the UN have warned that the electricity crisis and resulting humanitarian crisis may lead Gaza to initiate military hostilities. Hamas has labelled Israel's decision as "dangerous and catastrophic", threatening to renew violence.

According to Asharq Al-Awsat Egypt offered, in June 2017, to supply Gaza with electricity in exchange for the extradition of 17 wanted terrorists and other security demands. On 20 June 2017, it was reported that Egypt and Hamas reached an understanding according to which Egypt would supply 500 tons of diesel fuel daily. This supply was not subject to Israeli custom duties (which would have been withheld by the PA).

In July 2017, untreated sewage was directed to the sea, due to the lack of electricity, severely polluting Gaza's beaches. As a result, the number of beach goers plummeted. The Israeli beach of Zikim was closed as well due to the sewage pollution from Gaza. Gazan sewage was also pumped into Israel via Nahal Hanoun from Beit Hanoun and Beit Lahia polluting the Israeli coastal groundwater aquifer.

In August 2017, the United Nations human rights office called on Israeli, Palestinian and Hamas authorities to resolve the conflict, saying "We are deeply concerned about the steady deterioration in the humanitarian conditions and the protection of human rights in Gaza", and that the supply of electricity for less than four a hours a day since April "has a grave impact on the provision of essential health, water and sanitation services".

Israeli human rights group B'Tselem has documented how Gazans cope with electricity being provided on a rolling blackout schedule of a few hours a day, and has further said that Israel should take responsibility for the crisis, a responsibility Israel denies, saying that Hamas should allocate funds for electricity rather than personal gain and military expenditure on equipment and military tunnels.

=== Further disruptions ===
In August 2020, the Gaza power plant shut down after Israel suspended fuel shipments after dozens of incendiary balloons were launched from Gaza causing brush fires in southern Israel. Political sources described the effort as a bid to pressure Israel to ease its blockade and allow more Arab and international investment.

During the 2021 Israel–Palestine crisis, electric lines supplying Gaza from Israel were struck by errant Gazan rockets, knocking out three of the ten power lines from Israel, severely reducing the electricity supply. At the time, the Israel Electric Corporation stated that it cannot repair the lines, and after the fighting ceased the IEC Union released a statement refusing to repair the facilities until Israeli prisoners of Hamas (including Avera Mengistu and the bodies of Hadar Goldin and Oron Shaul) were returned.

During the Gaza war, Israel shut off the supply of electricity to Gaza. The sole remaining power station ran out of fuel on 11 October 2023.

== Power sources ==
Almost all of Gaza's liquid fuel and about half of its electricity is supplied by Israel. These supplies are normally not subject to the continuing blockade of the Gaza Strip, though limitations apply.

As of 2017, Gaza's normal energy needs are estimated to be approximately 400–600 megawatts for full 24-hour supply to all residents. The electricity is normally supplied by:

- Gaza's sole power plant which has a nominal rating of 60–140 MW (figures vary due to degree of operation and damage to the plant) which is reliant on diesel fuel imported via Israel,
- 125 MW supplied by Israel Electric Corporation (IEC) via 10 power lines, and
- 27 MW supplied by Egypt.

Even in normal conditions, the current rated supply of Gaza is inadequate to meet growing needs, and the crisis has led to further closure and reductions to each of these power sources.

== See also ==
- Energy crisis
- Energy in Palestine
- Water politics in the Middle East
