= Putty-putty =

In economics, putty-putty describes an attribute of capital in financial models. Putty-putty capital can be transformed from flexible capital into durable goods then back again. This contrasts with putty-clay capital which can be converted from flexible capital into durable goods but which cannot then be converted back into re-investable capital.
