= Pacman conjecture =

Economic theory

The conjecture compares the behavior of "get-it-while-you-can" consumers to that of the videogame character Pac-Man, who hungrily eats all available dots.

The Pacman conjecture holds that durable-goods monopolists have complete market power and so can exercise perfect price discrimination, thus extracting the total surplus. This is in contrast to the Coase conjecture which holds that a durable goods monopolist has no market power, and so price is equal to the competitive market price.

In a December 1989 journal article Mark Bagnoli, Stephen W. Salant, and Joseph E. Swierzbinski theorized that if each consumer could be relied upon to buy a good as soon as its price dipped below a certain point (with different consumers valuing goods differently, but all pursuing the same "get-it-while-you-can" strategy), then a monopolist could set prices very high initially and then "eat his way down the demand curve", extracting maximum profit in what Bagnoli et al. called "the Pacman strategy" after the voracious video game character. Specifically, Bagnoli et al. state that "Pacman is a sequential best reply to get-it-while-you-can", a result they call "the Pacman Theorem". Their proof, however, relies strongly on the assumption that there is an infinite time horizon.

== Durable-goods monopolists and the Coase conjecture ==
A durable-goods monopolist sells goods which are in finite supply and which last forever, (not depreciating over time). According to the Coase Conjecture, such a monopolist has no market power as it is in competition with itself; the more of the good it sells in period one the less it will be able to sell in future periods.

Assuming marginal costs are zero. In the first period the monopolist will produce quantity (Q_{1}) where marginal cost = marginal revenue and so extract the monopoly surplus. However, in the second period the monopolist will face a new residual demand curve (Q − Q_{1}) and so will produce quantity where the new marginal revenue is equal to the marginal cost, which is at the competitive market price.

There is then an incentive for consumers to delay purchase of the good as they realize that its price will decrease over time. If buyers are patient enough they will not buy until the price falls and so durable goods monopolists face a horizontal demand curve at the equilibrium price and so will have no market power.

== Durable-goods monopolists and the Pacman conjecture ==
The Pacman Conjecture on the other hand holds that consumers realize the price of the good will only fall when they purchase the good; therefore, a patient monopolist can exercise full market power and perfectly price-discriminate.

The monopolist sets the price of the durable good at time t equal to the highest reservation price of a consumer who hasn't purchased prior to that point t. The consumer then buys the good as soon as it is equal to their reservation price, as they realize price will not fall further unless they purchase it. (Bagnoli et al. refer to buyers exhibiting this behavior as "type ℓ buyers", or "buyers following the get-it-while-you-can strategy".)

The Pacman Conjecture requires that the monopolist to have perfect information about consumer reservation prices and an infinite time horizon. The buyers must not only follow the get-it-while-you-can strategy, but also must faithfully believe that the monopolist is following a perfect Pacman strategy (as otherwise they would be tempted to match patience with the monopolist in hopes of getting a better deal later). The monopolist will exercise full market power over the buyers in that pool, but will not be able to extract similar surpluses from buyers who come in from outside (for example, the children of the original buyers) without deviating from the pure Pacman strategy.

== Differences between Coase and Pacman conjectures ==
=== Pacman conjecture ===
- finite set of buyers,
- infinite time horizon,
- monopolists have maximum market power,
- monopolists perfectly price-discriminate.

=== Coase conjecture ===
- Patient buyers (discount factor greater than or equal to 0.5),
- non-atomic buyers,
- infinite time horizon,
- reservation prices are continuous,
- monopolists have no market power,
- price is equal to the perfectly competitive price equilibrium.
