= Coase conjecture =

Monopoly pricing model

The Coase conjecture, developed first by Ronald Coase, is an argument in monopoly theory. The conjecture sets up a situation in which a monopolist sells a durable good to a market where resale is impossible and faces consumers who have different valuations. The conjecture proposes that a monopolist that does not know individuals' valuations will have to sell its product at a low price if the monopolist tries to separate consumers by offering different prices in different periods. This is because the monopolist is, in effect, in price competition with itself over several periods and the consumer with the highest valuation, if he is patient enough, can simply wait for the lowest price. Thus, the monopolist will have to offer a competitive price in the first period which will be low. The conjecture holds only when there is an infinite time horizon, as otherwise a possible action for the monopolist would be to announce a very high price until the second to last period and then sell at the static monopoly price in the last period. The monopolist could avoid this problem by committing to a stable linear pricing strategy or adopting other business strategies.

== Simple two-consumer model ==
Imagine there are consumers, called $X$ and $Y$ with valuations of good with $x$ and $y$ respectively. The valuations are such as $x<y<2x$. The monopoly cannot directly identify individual consumers, but it knows that there are 2 different valuations of a good. The good being sold is durable so that once a consumer buys it, the consumer will still have it in all subsequent periods. This means that after the monopolist has sold to all consumers, there can be no further sales. Also assume that production is such that average cost and marginal cost are both equal to zero.

The monopolist could try to charge at a $\text{price} = y$ in the first period and then in the second period $\text{price} =x$, hence price discriminating. This will not result in consumer $Y$ buying in the first period because, by waiting, she could get price equal to $x$. To make consumer $Y$ indifferent between buying in the first period or the second period, the monopolist will have to charge a price of $\text{price} = dx +(1-d)y$ where $d$ is a discount factor between 0 and 1. This price is such as $dx + (1-d)y < y$.

Hence by waiting, $Y$ forces the monopolist to compete on price with its future self.

== n consumers ==
Imagine there are $n$ consumers with valuations ranging from $y$ to a valuation just above zero. The monopolist will want to sell to the consumer with the lowest valuation. This is because production is costless and by charging a price just above zero it still makes a profit. Hence to separate the consumers, the monopoly will charge first consumer $(1-d)^n y$ where $n$ is the number of consumers. If the discount factor is high enough this price will be close to zero. Hence the conjecture is proved.

== See also ==
- The Pacman conjecture
- Durapolist
