= Millennium Palestine Ramallah Hotel =

Hotel in Ramallah, Palestine

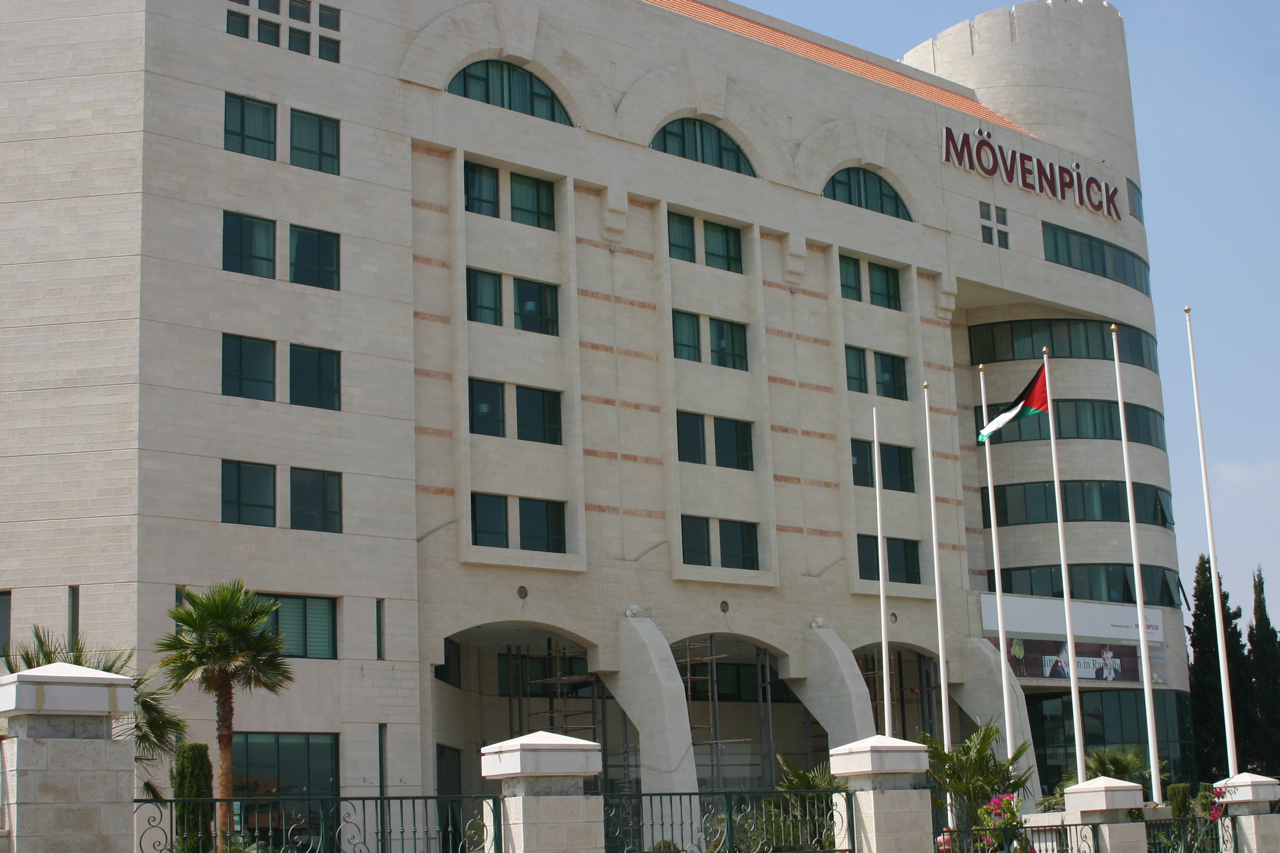

- Location within State of Palestine

General information
- Location: Ramallah, Palestine
- Coordinates: 31°53′43″N 35°12′17″E
- Opening: November 1, 2010
- Operator: Millennium Hotels and Resorts

Technical details
- Floor count: 6

Other information
- Number of rooms: 171
- Number of restaurants: 5

The Millennium Palestine Ramallah Hotel (Arabic: فندق موفنبيك) is a five-star hotel located in Ramallah, West Bank, Palestine. It cost $42.5 million (£26.4m) to build.

The hotel was first conceived in the 1990s but was delayed due to the political unrest that followed. Construction began in 2000 and was completed 10 years later. Progress was hindered by difficulties and delays relating to the importing of goods into the territory from Israel.

The hotel opened on November 1, 2010, managed by Mövenpick Hotels & Resorts as the Mövenpick Hotel Ramallah. It was renamed the Millennium Palestine Ramallah Hotel in August 2017, after Millennium Hotels and Resorts assumed management.

The hotel contains five restaurants and bars, 171 rooms including two presidential suites, a range of luxury banqueting and conference facilities, a heated outdoor pool, and a gym.

The hotel is aimed principally at a business clientele, and it also hopes to attract the growing number of tourists and pilgrims visiting the West Bank.
