= Levant Quartet =

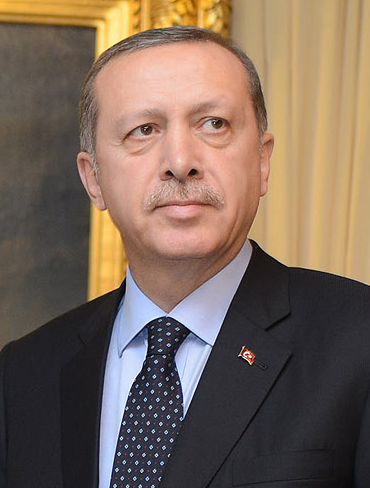
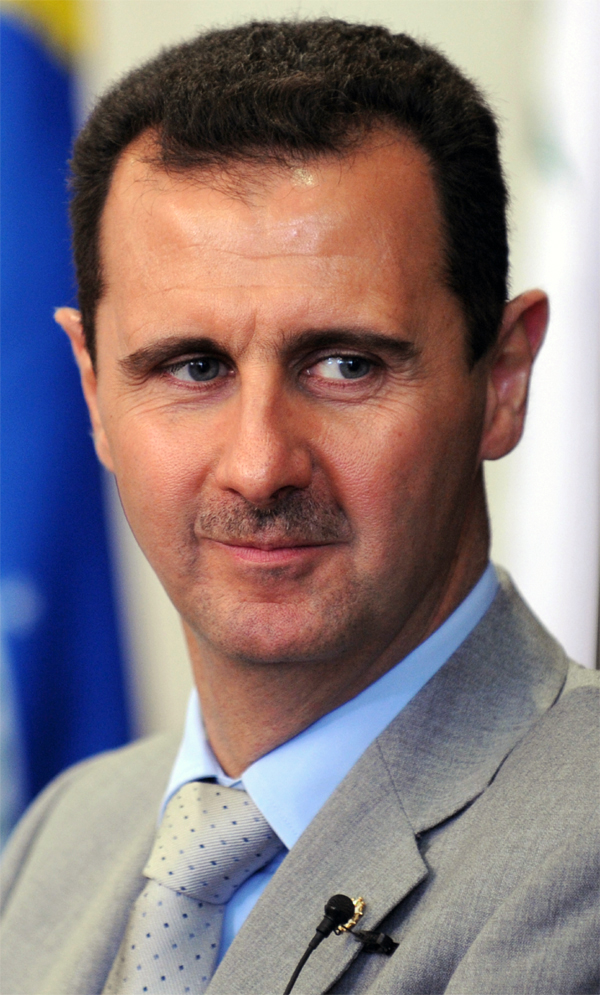
Recep Tayyip Erdoğan and Bashar al-Assad launched the Levant Quartet in 2010.

The Levant Quartet was a formal economic and cultural partnership of Turkey, Lebanon, Syria, and Jordan formed in December 2010. The Quartet had the stated aim of eventually giving rise to an economic, cultural, monetary and political union similar to the European Union in the Middle East. Projected member states included the four founders as well as Bahrain, Iran, Iraq, Kuwait, Oman, Qatar, the United Arab Emirates and Yemen.

The Quartet agreement was formed following a decade of increasing trade and diplomatic traffic between Turkey and the other member states. The Levant Business Forum was set up, with a secretariat at Beirut, with the intention of enabling free circulation of goods and people among the Quartet states. Also planned was a customs union called Shamgen, a pun on Sham and the EU's Schengen Agreement, in which Iran and Iraq would participate by issuing joint visas with Turkey and Syria. The project was effectively put to a stop when Turkey imposed economic sanctions on Syria in the wake of the uprising in Syria, less than a year after it was first announced. The participants in the original Levant Quartet agreement did announce their intention to resume negotiations "as soon as the situation normalizes".

World Bank analysts saw "sizable" benefits for the Levantine countries from the expected increase in trade that the Levant Quartet would have generated, had the Syrian Civil War not halted it. Soner Cagaptay commented that the plan fit within the AK Party's vision of Turkey as "the Brazil of the Middle East, a rising economic power with a burning desire to shape regional events".

== See also ==
- Accession of Turkey to the European Union
- Arab Spring
- Turkish involvement in the Syrian Civil War
