= Durable good =

Good that has long term use

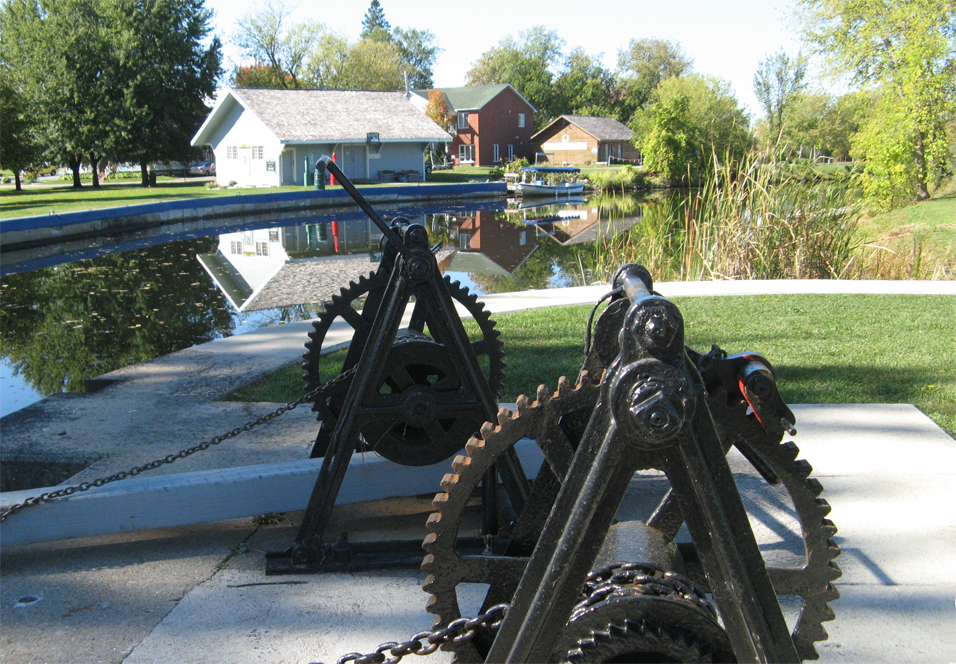
The heavy iron lock machinery at the Merrickville locks in the Rideau Canal, which was built in 1832, remains in use for pleasure boaters in 2025.

In economics, a durable good or a hard good or consumer durable is a good that does not quickly wear out or, more specifically, one that yields utility over time rather than being completely consumed in one use. Items like bricks could be considered perfectly durable goods because they should theoretically never wear out. Highly durable goods such as refrigerators or cars usually continue to be useful for several years of use, so durable goods are typically characterized by long periods between successive purchases.

Nondurable goods or soft goods (consumables) are the opposite of durable goods. They may be defined either as goods that are immediately consumed in one use or ones that have a lifespan of less than three years. Examples of nondurable goods include fast-moving consumer goods such as food, cosmetics, cleaning products, medication, clothing, packaging and fuel. While durable goods can usually be rented as well as bought, nondurable goods generally are not rented, apart from some clothing categories (e.g. formal wear rentals).

Durable goods are typically replaced due to obsolescence rather than breakdown.

== Role in economy ==
Durable goods are known to form an imperative part of economic production. This can be exemplified from the fact that personal expenditures on durables exceeded the total value of $800 billion in 2000. In the year 2000 itself, durable goods production composed of approximately 60 percent of aggregate production within the manufacturing sector in the United States.

== Examples ==
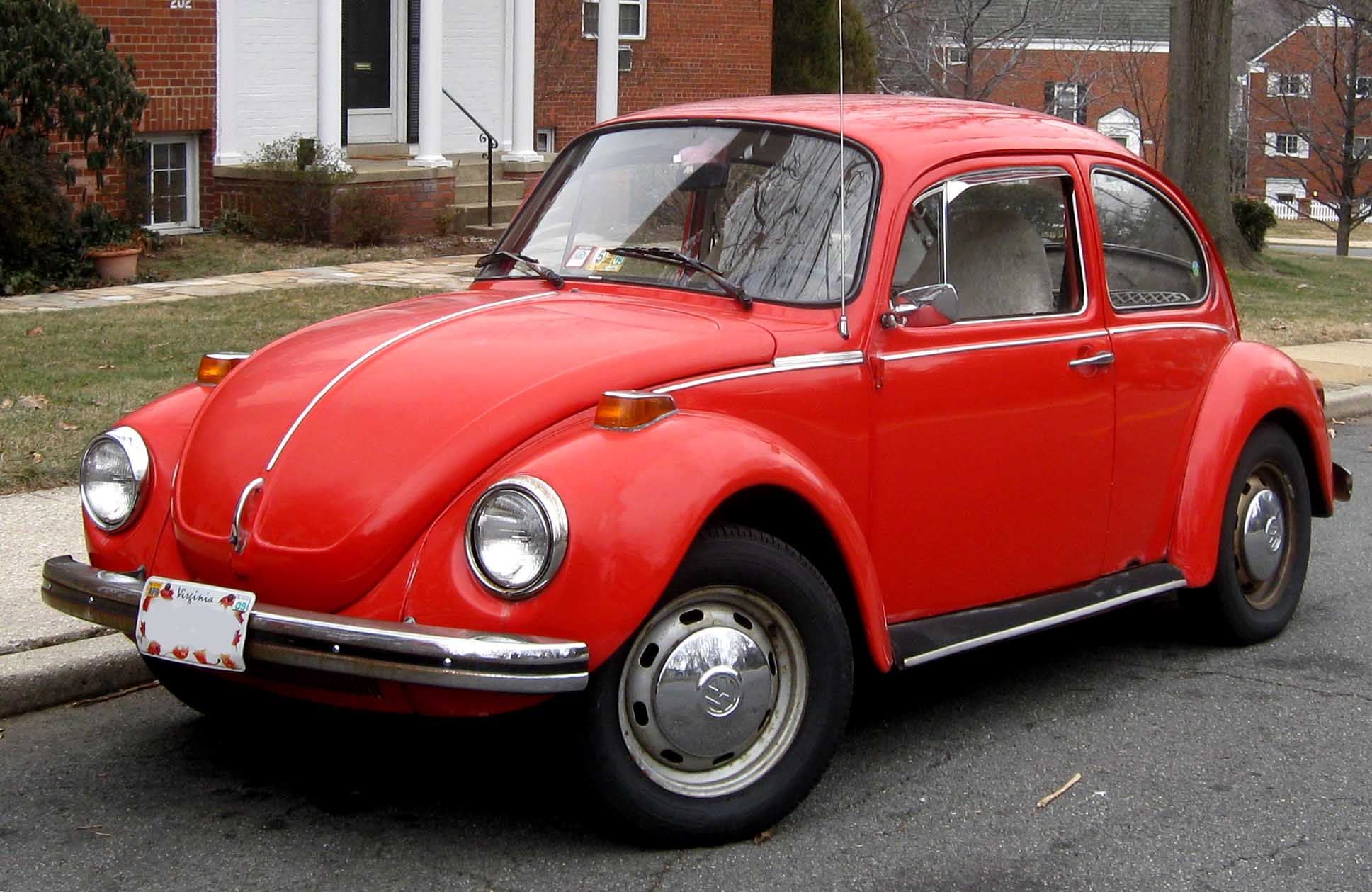
A car is a durable good. The gasoline that powers it is a non-durable (or consumable) good.

Examples of consumer durable goods include housing, vehicles, books, household goods (home appliances, consumer electronics, furniture, musical instruments, tools, etc.), sports equipment, jewelry, medical equipment, and toys.

== Durability ==
Durability can be defined "the ability of a product to perform its required function over a lengthy period under normal conditions of use without excessive expenditure on maintenance or repair". Several units may be used to measure the durability of a product according to its field of application such as years of existence, hours of use and operational cycles.

=== Product life spans and sustainable consumption ===
Stopping the production of non-durable goods was supported by many European respondents to the European Investment Bank Climate Survey 2020–2021. It was a less popular idea in China.

The life span of household goods is significant for sustainable consumption. The longer product life spans could contribute to eco-efficiency and sufficiency, thus slowing consumption in order to progress towards a sustainable consumption. Cooper (2005) proposed a model to demonstrate the crucial role of product life spans for sustainable production and consumption.

Durability, as a characteristic relating to the quality of goods that can be demanded by consumers, was not clear until an amendment of the law in 1994 relating to the quality standards for supplied goods.

The condition of the economy is one of the biggest factors as well as the philosophy of money. Consumers want to use their money effectively and essentially get what they paid for, and in the best-case scenario, get more than what they paid for. In the pursuit of durable goods through the lifespans of the products and consumption of those products money and price dictate two of the biggest factors other than supply and demand.

At some point, people will realize that they can trade more easily if they use some intermediate good—money. This intermediate good should ideally be easy to handle, store and transport (function i). It should be easy to measure and divide to facilitate calculations (function ii). And it should be difficult to destroy so that it lasts over time (function iii)

— de Bruin (2023)

Durable goods fall into this category, as ease of commerce and convenience are key factors in making it a good product to buy.

== See also ==
- Centennial Light
- Coase conjecture
- Disposable product
- Industrial organization
- Pacman conjecture
- Planned obsolescence
- Putty-putty
- Quality assurance
- Source reduction
- Yellow, red and orange goods
