= Natural gas in the Gaza Strip =

Offshore gas reserves off the Gaza coast

The reserves of natural gas were found offshore the Gaza Strip in 2000, within the framework of licensing to British Gas by the Palestinian Authority. The discovered Gaza Marine gas field, though mediocre in size, had been considered at the time as one of the possible drives to boost Palestinian economy and promote regional cooperation.

With the Hamas takeover of the Gaza Strip in 2007, the chances for developing the gas field reduced, due to a stand-off with the Palestinian administration and Israel's refusal to deal with Hamas. The chances further diminished with the discovery of major gas fields in the Israeli economic waters in 2009 and 2010, making Israel an unlikely customer for the Palestinian gas. In 2023 Israel has given preliminary approval for the development of the Gaza Marine gas field, with the involvement of the Palestinian Authority and Egypt, but, as of 2024, Gaza's natural gas was still underwater.

== History ==
=== Legal status ===
The legal status of the Gaza Marine gas field is complex and contested. In 1999, the license for the area was controversially granted to the Palestinian Authority by Israeli Prime Minister Ehud Barak, but its precise legal standing remains ambiguous. As a result, when the Houston-based Noble Energy and its Israeli partner Delek took BG Group to court in 2021 to challenge the license area it had been given by the PA, the court abstained from giving a verdict, because, according to the government of Israel, pending a final peace deal, it was the equivalent of “no-man’s water. Moreover, in 2001, Barak, as a goodwill gesture, adjusted the maritime boundary in the region, ensuring that the entirety of Gaza Marine would be situated within Palestinian territorial waters, rather than extending into Israel's Exclusive Economic Zone.

The Gaza Marine field's location complicates its management, as neither the Palestinian Authority nor Hamas, which controls Gaza, has full jurisdiction over it. According to the Oslo Accords, maritime zones near Gaza are under partial Palestinian control, yet any activity beyond 20 nautical miles requires Israeli naval approval. The situation is further complicated by increased Israeli control over the area since Hamas took over Gaza in 2007.

=== 1999-2004 ===
The Palestinians signed a memorandum of intent on November 8, 1999 with British Gas and a company linked to the Palestinian Authority, the Consolidated Contractors Company, giving them rights to explore the area. The natural gas deposits, found in two small gas fields dubbed Gaza Marine 1 and Gaza Marine 2, have been discovered in September 2000, 36 kilometres (22 mi) offshore, at a depth of 2,000 feet (610 m). The two Gaza Marine fields were estimated to contain more than 1 trillion cubic feet (about 30 billion cubic meters) of natural gas, more than is needed to power the Palestinian territories, with potential to export. Security and economic negotiations have been ongoing with Israel Electric Corporation (IEC) and Egypt exploring options for converting the natural gas into liquefied natural gas. The gas field has been portrayed as potentially beneficial to both Israelis and Palestinians.

The IEC initially refused to purchase gas from the Gaza Marine field because the price was higher than gas available from Egypt. However, reports later indicated that the refusal was politically motivated. In 2001, then-Prime Minister Ariel Sharon blocked any deal involving Palestinian gas. By May 2002, Sharon lifted the veto after encouragement from British Prime Minister Tony Blair, who believed that purchasing Palestinian gas could contribute to advancing peace efforts during a tense period. Despite some progress in negotiations, in the summer of 2003, Sharon reversed his stance, halting any deal that might allow funds to reach the Palestinian Authority (PA), citing concerns that such funds could support terrorism.

=== Negotiations after Arafat's death - 2004-2007 ===
Negotiations over the Gaza Marine gas field saw a positive shift after the death of Yasser Arafat in 2004 and the election of Mahmud Abbas, leading to a series of reforms in PA. Cooperation further improved with the election of Ehud Olmert as Israeli Prime Minister in 2006. On April 29, 2007, the Israeli cabinet agreed to reopen talks with the British Gas Group (BG), and by May, Israel had proposed purchasing 0.05 TCF (1.4 BCM) of Palestinian gas annually billion starting in 2009. A secret agreement between Abbas and the Israeli government ensured that the PA's gas revenues would be managed through an international account to prevent access by the Hamas-dominated PA government. The deal included plans to pipe gas to Ashkelon for liquefaction and distribution, which would support both Israeli and Gaza energy needs, fostering economic interdependence seen as beneficial for peace efforts.

=== After 2007 ===
In 2014, PA and Russian officials discussed a possible cooperation between Gazprom and the Palestinian Investment Fund in the field of gas and oil exploration and extraction. In September 2015, Abbas visited Moscow, where he further discussed with Russian President Vladimir Putin the possibility that Gazprom develops Gaza Marine field, but no specific formula was reached.

In 2015, the Palestinian government resumed negotiations on the agreement with BG and abrogated the exclusive rights it had given to the company. It also raised the PIF share from 10% under the old agreement to 17.5%. Subsequently, Shell acquired BG on April 8, 2016.

As of 2017, the Gaza Marine field licenses were owned by PIF with 17.5% of the field development rights, Consolidated Contractors Company owns 27.5% of these rights and Shell 55%. The development and gas extraction rights belonged to the Palestinians alone. In the year 2018, Shell company, which had taken over British Gas earlier, decided to relinquish its 60% stake in Gaza Marine, transferring it to Palestinian state companies.

=== Multilateral partnership between Egypt, Israel and PA ===
As of 2023, Israel, Egypt, and the Palestinian Authority reached an agreement to jointly develop this gas field. According to the agreement, PIF and the Consolidated Contractors Company each hold a 27.5 percent stake in the project, while the remaining 45 percent goes to Egypt's natural gas consortium, EGAS. The gas extraction will occur within Palestinian waters, and the gas will be transported via a 40-mile undersea pipeline to Egypt for processing. Once integrated into Egypt's energy grid, the natural gas will be sold, as an export, to Palestinians and others. In June 2023, Israel granted preliminary approval to the project, while clarifying that its implementation is "subject to coordination" between its security services, Egypt and the PA, in order to "maintain its security and diplomatic interests."

== See also ==
- Natural gas in Israel
