= Gaza Power Plant =

Power plant in Gaza, Palestine

Gaza Power Plant محطة توليد كهرباء غزة
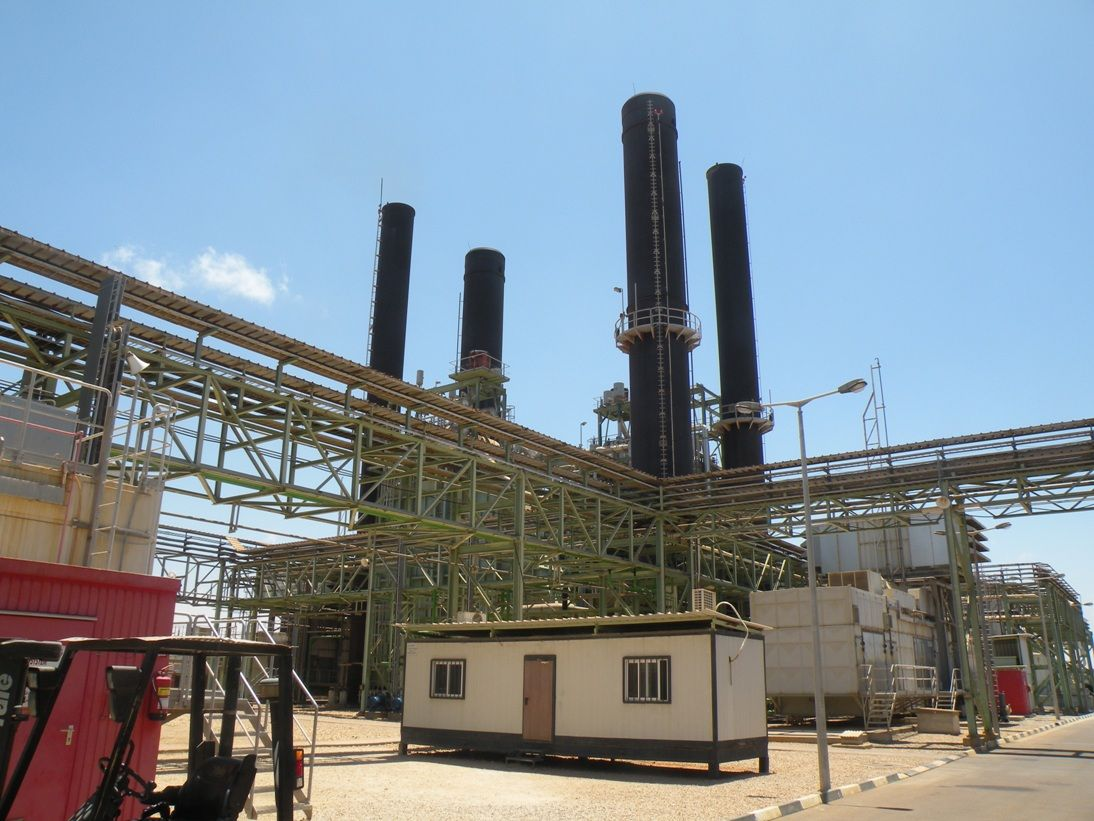
- The plant in 2010
- Official name: محطة توليد كهرباء غزة
- Country: Palestine
- Location: Gaza Strip
- Coordinates: 31°27′21.4″N 34°24′04.2″E
- Status: Operational
- Commission date: 2002

Thermal power station
- Primary fuel: Diesel fuel

Power generation
- Units operational: 4
- Nameplate capacity: 95 MW

External links
- Website: www.pec.ps/index.php?lang=en
- Commons: Related media on Commons

The Gaza Power Plant (Arabic: محطة توليد كهرباء غزة) is a fossil fuel power station in Gaza Strip, Palestine.

== History ==
The power plant was built in 2002. On 28 June 2006 during the 2006 Gaza–Israel conflict, the six transformers of the power plant were destroyed by missile attacks by Israeli Air Force. In 2007, the power plant was rebuilt and it operated at a maximum capacity of 80 MW.

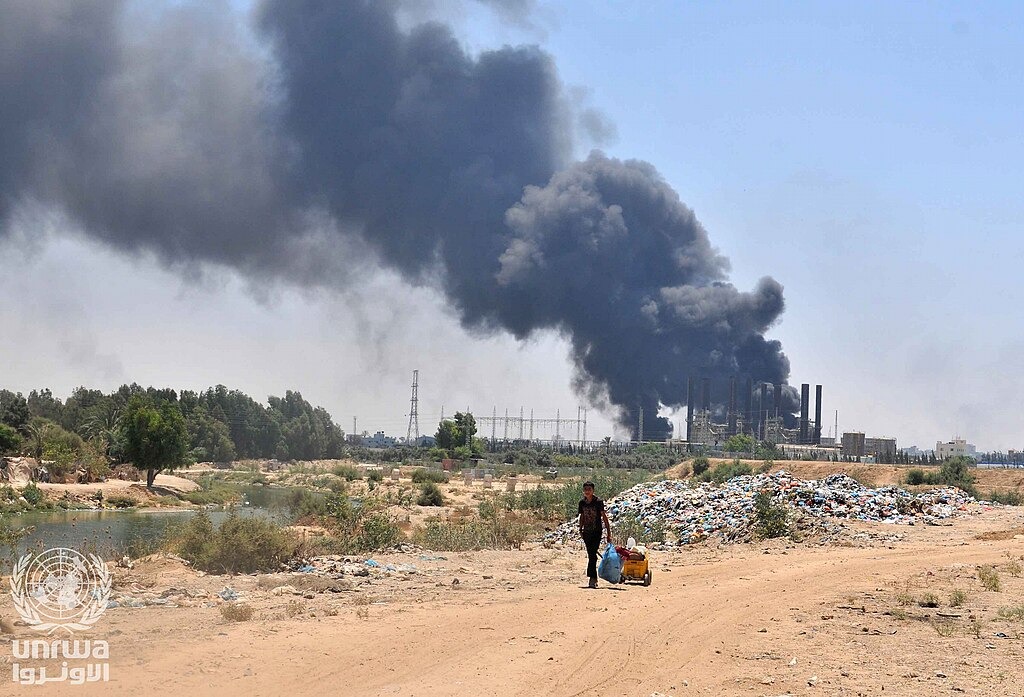
The power plant in 2014 after it was attacked by the Israeli army.

On 29 July 2014, the power plant was attacked again by the Israel Defense Forces.

On October 11, 2023, the plant reportedly stopped working after it ran out of fuel due to the blockade on Gaza imposed by Israel during the Gaza war.

== Technical specifications ==
The power plant has a total of four generating units with an installed capacity of 140 MW.

== See also ==
- Gaza electricity crisis
