= Concessions in Mandatory Palestine =

Monopolies for the operation of key economic assets

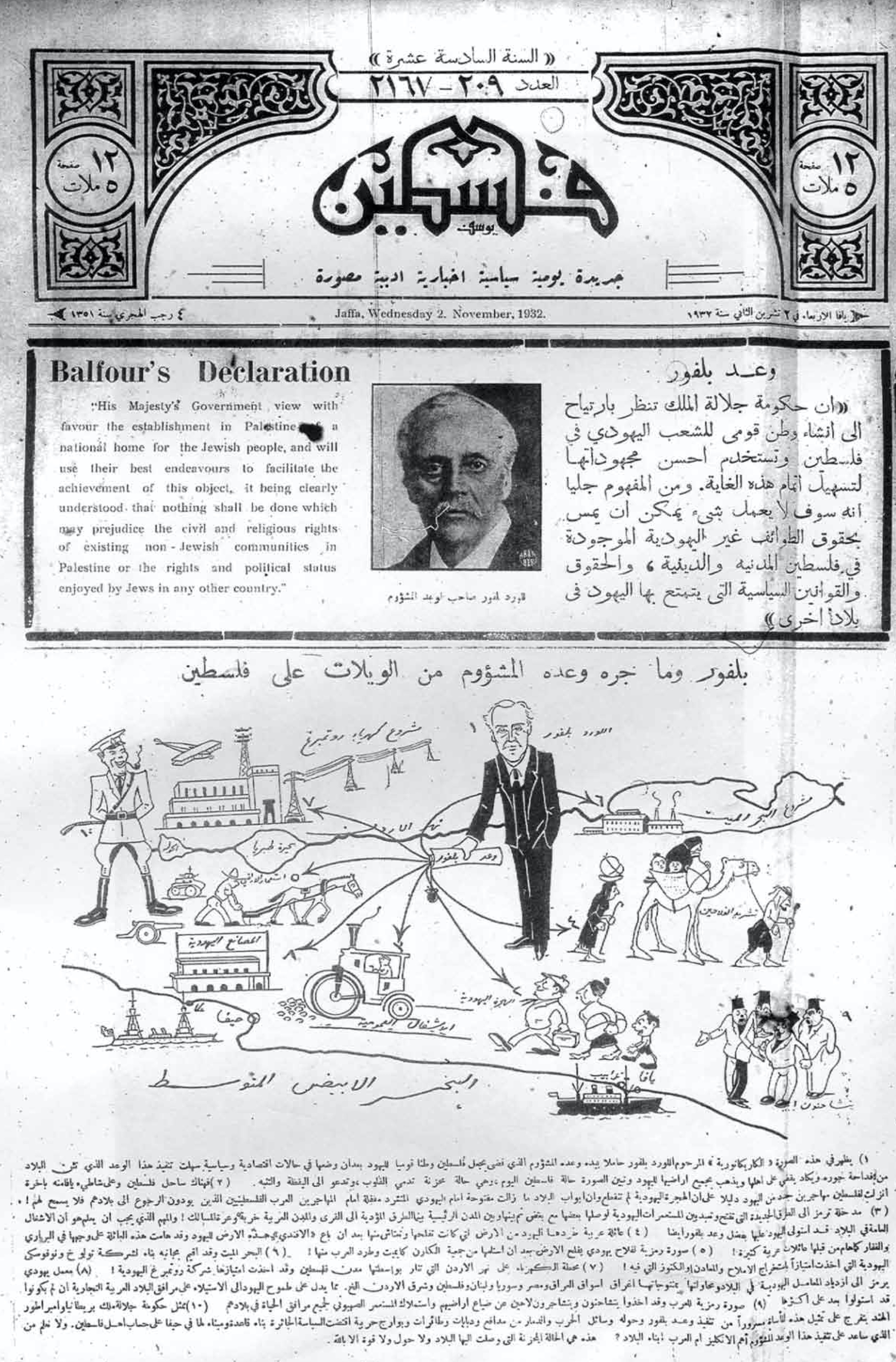
Front page of the Arabic newspaper Falastin on the 15th anniversary of the Balfour Declaration, 2 November 1932. The Jordan River Concession is shown in the top left corner of the cartoon (Arabic: مشروع كهرباء روتنبرغ, romanized: Mashrue Kahraba' Rutenburgh, lit. 'Rutenberg Electricity Project'), and the Dead Sea Concession is shown in the top right.

The Concessions in Mandatory Palestine were a number of monopolies for the operation of key economic assets in Mandatory Palestine.

== List of concessions ==
The 1937 Peel Commission and the 1938 Woodhead Commission provided a list of the concessions granted:

=== Bodies of water ===
- The Dead Sea Concession (Moshe Novomeysky's Palestine Potash Company)
- The Jordan River Concession (Pinhas Rutenberg's Palestine Electric Corporation and the First Jordan Hydro-Electric Power House)
- The Jerusalem Electric and Public Service Corporation (Euripides Mavrommatis; sold to Balfour Beatty in 1928)
- The Auja Concession (the Palestine Electric Corporation)
- The drainage of Lake Huleh and the adjacent marshes (see Hula Concession purchase)

=== Oil transport ===
- The Transit of Mineral Oils through Palestine and the Establishment of an Oil Refinery at Haifa (Anglo-Iranian Oil Company)
- The Transit of Mineral Oils through Palestine (Iraq Petroleum Company)

=== Shipping infrastructure ===
- Lighthouses (Marius Michel Pasha)
- Bonded warehouses (Levant Bonded Warehouses Company, owned by an Egyptian company today known as General Company for Silos and Storage)

=== Spas ===
- The Tiberias Hot Baths (the Hamei-Tiberia Company)
- El Hamma Mineral Springs (Suleiman Bey Nassif)

=== Table and details ===
Topic	Concession	Date / original grant	Holder / operator	Rights granted	Term
Oil transport	Anglo-Iranian Oil Company pipeline convention	18 October 1933	Anglo-Iranian Oil Company Ltd.	Construct, maintain and operate one or more pipelines and ancillary works to transport crude oil from the Iraqi frontier to a Palestinian coastal terminal, intended to be Acre Bay.	70 years
Oil transport	Anglo-Iranian Oil Company refinery convention	10 March 1938	Anglo-Iranian Oil Company Ltd.	Construct, maintain and operate one or more oil refineries and ancillary works within five years; load and unload oil at the Haifa Harbour oil dock.	Linked to the 1933 convention
Oil transport	Iraq Petroleum Company pipeline convention	5 January 1931	Iraq Petroleum Company Ltd.	Construct, maintain and operate one or more pipelines and ancillary works; pipelines were to terminate at Acre Bay if practicable.	70 years
Oil transport	Iraq Petroleum Company Haifa oil-dock agreement	10 July 1933	Iraq Petroleum Company Ltd.	Government undertook to construct and maintain an oil dock at Haifa Harbour; the company could load and unload oil there, operate and control the dock, and provide services.	Not separately stated
Oil transport	Iraq Petroleum Company supplemental convention	29 May 1939	Iraq Petroleum Company Ltd.	Facilities to dispose of unrefined petroleum to Consolidated Refineries Ltd. for its operations in Palestine.	Not separately stated
Oil transport	Trans-Arabian Pipeline Company convention	7 January 1946	Trans-Arabian Pipeline Company, subsidiary of the Arabian-American Oil Company	Construct, maintain and operate one or more pipelines, refineries and ancillary works; the coastal terminus was to be agreed with the High Commissioner.	70 years
Electricity	Jerusalem electricity concession	25 February 1926; amended 4 April 1928	Jerusalem Electric and Public Service Corporation (Euripides Mavrommatis; sold to Balfour Beatty in 1928)	Generate, supply and distribute electricity within an area defined by a 20 km radius from the central dome of the Church of the Holy Sepulchre.	44 years, with a 16-year extension
Electricity	Auja electricity and irrigation concession	12 September 1921	Pinhas Rutenberg; operated through Jaffa Electric Company Ltd., later amalgamated into the Palestine Electric Corporation	Use waters of the Auja basin to generate, utilise and supply electricity and provide irrigation in the former Jaffa Governorate, approximately the later Lydda District.	32 years, with provision for renewal
Electricity	Jordan River electricity concession	5 March 1926	Palestine Electric Corporation Ltd. (Pinhas Rutenberg; see First Jordan Hydro-Electric Power House)	Use the waters of the River Jordan and its basin, including the Yarmuk River, to generate electricity and supply and distribute it throughout Palestine and Trans-Jordan, subject to prior Jerusalem, Auja and Huleh rights.	70 years
Irrigation	Huleh concession	June 1914	Palestine Land Development Company, after transfers in 1918 and 1934	Drain Lake Huleh and the adjacent marshes.	Not stated in Chapter XXV
Potash	Dead Sea concession	1 January 1930	Palestine Potash Ltd. (Moshe Novomeysky)	Extract mineral salts, minerals and chemicals from or beneath Dead Sea waters or from land exposed by recession; navigate the Dead Sea for business; obtain fresh water, except for electricity generation; construct an aerial ropeway and, if Government did not do so, railways north to Beisan or south to Aqaba.	75 years
Hot springs	Tiberias Hot Springs concession	15 April 1912	Hamei-Tiberia (Tiberias Hot Springs) Company (Yehoshua Suprasky)	Exploit the Tiberias mineral springs; construct a thermal-bath establishment and lay out gardens.	60 years under the 1937 lease
Hot springs	El Hamma Mineral Springs concession	30 December 1930	Hamma Mineral Springs Ltd. (Suleiman Bey Nassif)	Develop the hot springs at El Hamma in the Yarmuk gorge; establish thermal baths and a hotel on 200 dunums containing three main springs.	Originally 31 years; extended to 45 years in 1937
Shipping infrastructure	Bonded warehouses concession	23 February 1922	Levant Bonded Warehouses Company, owned by an Egyptian company today known as General Company for Silos and Storage	Carry on the business of bonded warehousemen in Palestine and establish warehouses on land within the customs zones at Haifa and Jaffa.	50 years
Shipping infrastructure	Lighthouse concession	20 August 1860; consolidated 6 December 1930	Marius Michel Pasha	Erect, maintain and administer lighthouses on the Palestinian coast.	To 4 September 1949

== Other concessions ==
Other concessions not included in the Woodhead or Peel reports:

- The Kabbara Concession

== Bibliography ==
- Saʼid B. Himadeh, 1938, Economic Organization Of Palestine
- Gradus, Yehuda; Krakover, Shaul; Razin, Eran (10 April 2006). The Industrial Geography of Israel. Routledge. ISBN 978-1-134-97632-4.
