= Palestine Electric Company =

Palestine Electric Company may refer to:

- Israel Electric Company, originally founded as Palestine Electric Company in 1926, later renamed into its current name;
- Jerusalem District Electricity Company, de facto being the largest electricity supplier to Palestinians in the West Bank;
- Palestine Electric Company PLC, the company holding the Nissirat power plant in the Gaza Strip
