= James Graham (photographer) =

Scottish photographer and missionary (1806–1859)

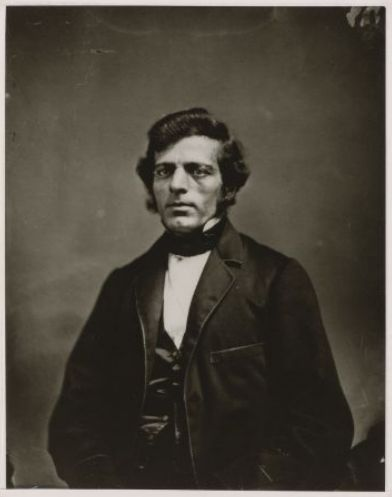
- Born: 1806
- Died: 1869 (aged 62–63)
- Known for: Photographs of Jerusalem

James Graham (1806–1869) was a Scottish photographer who took some of the earliest images of the Holy Land, where he was sent as lay secretary for the London Society for Promoting Christianity Amongst the Jews.

Graham, a former director of a Glasgow bank, having learnt the basics of photography, arrived in Jerusalem in December 1853 and stayed there for two-and-a-half years, taking lodgings in a tower on the Mount of Olives. While there he was visited by artists including Thomas Seddon and William Holman Hunt, both of whom seem to have used his photographs as reference material for their paintings.

When he exhibited photographs, he would often write an appropriate quotation from the Bible on the mount.

During his time in Jerusalem he taught photography to the Russian-born Mendel John Diness, who had been converted from Judaism, and baptised in 1849 by the British consul James Finn, as found in "Palestine and Egypt Under the Ottomans" By Hisham Khatib.

He was the author of a pamphlet called Jerusalem; its Missions, Schools, Converts etc. under Bishop Gobat published in London in 1858.

== See also ==
- Mendel Diness, a pupil of Graham in Jerusalem

== Sources ==
- Staley, Allen; Newall, Christopher (2004). Pre-Rapaelite Vision:Truth to Nature. London: The Tate Gallery.
