= Gerard Swope =

American electronics businessman (1872–1957)

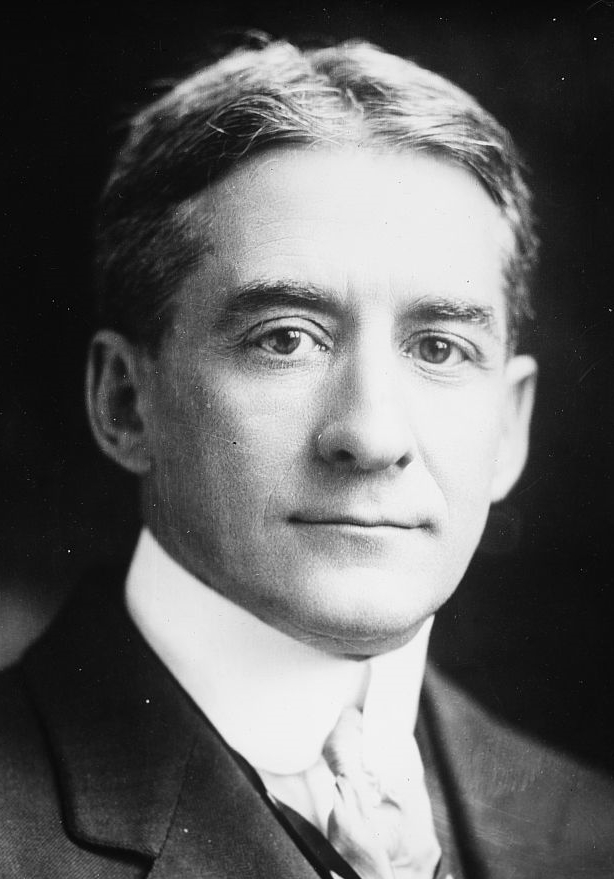
Gerard Swope

Gerard Swope (December 1, 1872 – November 20, 1957) was an American electronics businessman. He served as the president of General Electric between 1922 and 1940, and again from 1942 until 1945. During this time, Swope expanded GE's product offerings, reorienting GE towards consumer home appliances, and offering consumer credit services.

== Biography ==
Swope was born in St. Louis, Missouri, to Ida and Isaac Swope, Jewish immigrants from Germany. He graduated from the Massachusetts Institute of Technology in 1895. He married Mary Dayton Hill. He was the brother of Herbert Bayard Swope, and father of Henrietta Swope and John Swope, the Hollywood and Life Magazine photographer who married actress Dorothy McGuire.

He is possibly best known for his labor relations innovations. At General Electric, Swope implemented numerous labor reforms, making conditions better for employees with voluntary unemployment insurance, profit-sharing, and other programs that were considered radical in their day. Swope increased sales and overall efficiency (economics), earning high profits and market share and focused on employee training, retention, and loyalty. Before the passage of the Wagner Act, Swope "had long supported labor legislation."

He served as Chairman of The Business Council, then known as the Business Advisory Council, for the United States Department of Commerce in 1933. Swope's other Roosevelt administration roles included member, Industrial Advisory Board of the National Recovery Administration (NRA) (1933); member, Bureau of Advertising and Planning of the Department of Commerce (1933); chairman, Coal Advisory Board (1933); member, National Labor Board (1933); member, President's Advisory Council on Economic Security (1934); and member, Advisory Council on Social Security (1937–1938). In 1939, after reaching the GE mandatory retirement age of 67, he became chairman of the New York City Housing Authority, a full-time job. He left that post in 1942 to resume the presidency of G. E. for two years while Charles Edward Wilson served with the War Production Board. At Mr. Wilson's return Mr. Swope was elected honorary president. Swope was Assistant Secretary of the Treasury in 1942, when he was chairman of the committee to Study Budgets of Relief Appeals for Foreign Countries. For his work, he won the Hoover Medal.

== Later life ==
In 1949, Swope made his first visit to Israel at the suggestion of friends who were active in the Palestine Economic Corporation. On the trip, Swope expressed that he would consider moving to a kibbutz "if he didn't love New York so much." He was a long-time sponsor of the American Technion Society, which supported Technion University in Haifa.

He died in New York City on November 20, 1957. In 2005, Forbes Magazine ranked Swope as the 20th most influential businessman of all time.

In 1962, his family donated 245 acres of land in Westchester County, New York, to the Brooklyn Botanic Garden. That land promptly became the Teatown Lake Reservation, a nonprofit nature preserve and environmental education center that has since grown to more than 1,000 acres of land.

== Swope Plan ==
In September 1931, Swope presented a proposal for recovery. Under the Swope Plan, the Federal Trade Commission would supervise trade associations established for each industry. Trade associations would cover every company with at least 50 employees after three years. Associations would regulate output and set prices. Workers would receive life insurance, pensions, and unemployment insurance paid for in part by employers. The Chamber of Commerce and other conservative groups provided enthusiastic support.

President Herbert Hoover, who strongly supported voluntary trade associations, denounced the plan for being compulsory, inefficient, and monopolistic.

In an oral history interview, Leon H. Keyserling said the New Deal's National Industrial Recovery Act "started as a trade association act. The original draft of the act grew out of the so-called Gerard Swope Plan for Recovery." When asked in November 1933 about an updated Swope Plan, President Roosevelt said, "Mr. Swope's plan is a very interesting theoretical suggestion in regard to some ultimate development of N.R.A."

== Honors ==
- Hoover Medal, 1942
- Legion of Honor (France)
- Order of the Rising Sun (Japan)
- Honorary doctorates from Rutgers, Union, Colgate, Stevens Institute of Technology, Washington University in St. Louis, and Haifa Institute of Technology.
