= Hisham Khatib =

Jordanian politician, engineer and art collector

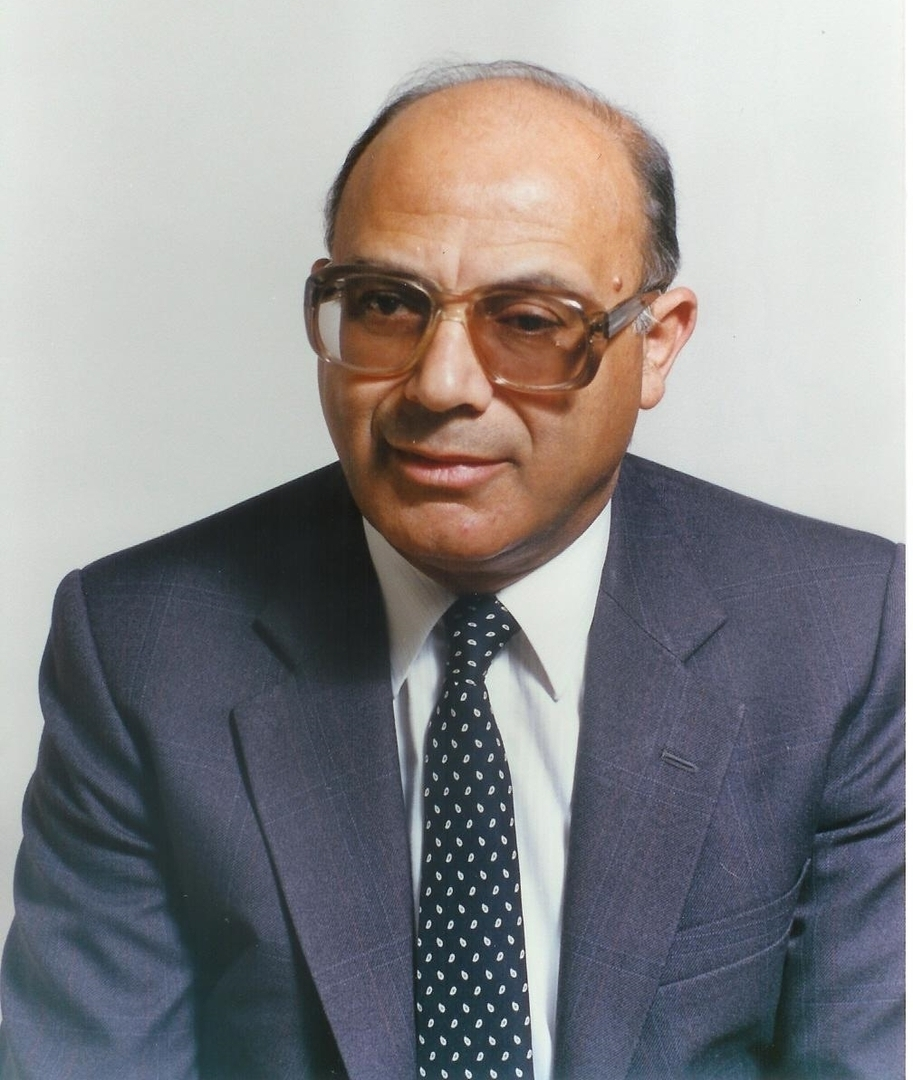
Hisham Khatib

Hisham Khatib (Arabic: "هشام الخطيب") (5 January 1936 – 31 May 2022) was a Jordanian politician and civil servant. He modernized and expanded the Jordanian and Palestinian electrical power capabilities during his service in the sector. He was the first Minister of Power and Mineral Resources in Jordan and Chairman of the Power Commission. During his later years, he served as a member of the Jordanian Senate.

Being of Palestinian origin and having spent much of his youth in Jerusalem, he developed a passion for the art and history of Palestine and the Holy Land. This developed into an interest in the region's 18th and 19th-century art and history. He spent considerable time collecting art, books, and artifacts relating to that era. He has also written many books on the topic, including his collection.

== Early life ==
Hisham Khatib was born in January 1936 in Acre at the house of his maternal grandfather, Sheikh Musa Al Tabari. His father Sheikh Mohammad Hashem Khatib was a judge. The family moved to Hebron for 1 year in 1941, then to Tulkarem in 1943 where they lived until 1945. They then moved again to Nablus where they lived until 1949 when his father was appointed as the Qadi (Judge) of Nablus. In 1949 the family moved to Jerusalem where his father was appointed to the Moslem Sharia Appeal Court of Jerusalem. In Jerusalem, Khatib attended El Rashadyia School headed by Tawfiq Abu Saud, then did his final year of schooling in Egypt in 1953 at El Nahrareh School.

== Education ==
After graduating from school, Dr. Khatib enrolled at the Engineering School of Ain Shams University, Egypt, in 1954 where he studied Electrical Engineering, finally receiving his BSc in 1959, the first of many degrees. In 1960 he won a scholarship to spend a two-year post-graduate apprenticeship in the UK. The apprenticeship did not live up to his ambitions, and he seized the opportunity to leave it and join a twelve-month M.Sc. course on electrical machines at the University of Birmingham. He completed his MSc in 1962 and returned to Jerusalem. After some time in the industry, he enrolled with Queen Mary University of London, UK to attain his two final degrees, a B.Sc. in Economics, and a Ph.D. in Electrical Engineering, for which he had to take a sabbatical leave from work. He finally received his Ph.D. in 1974.

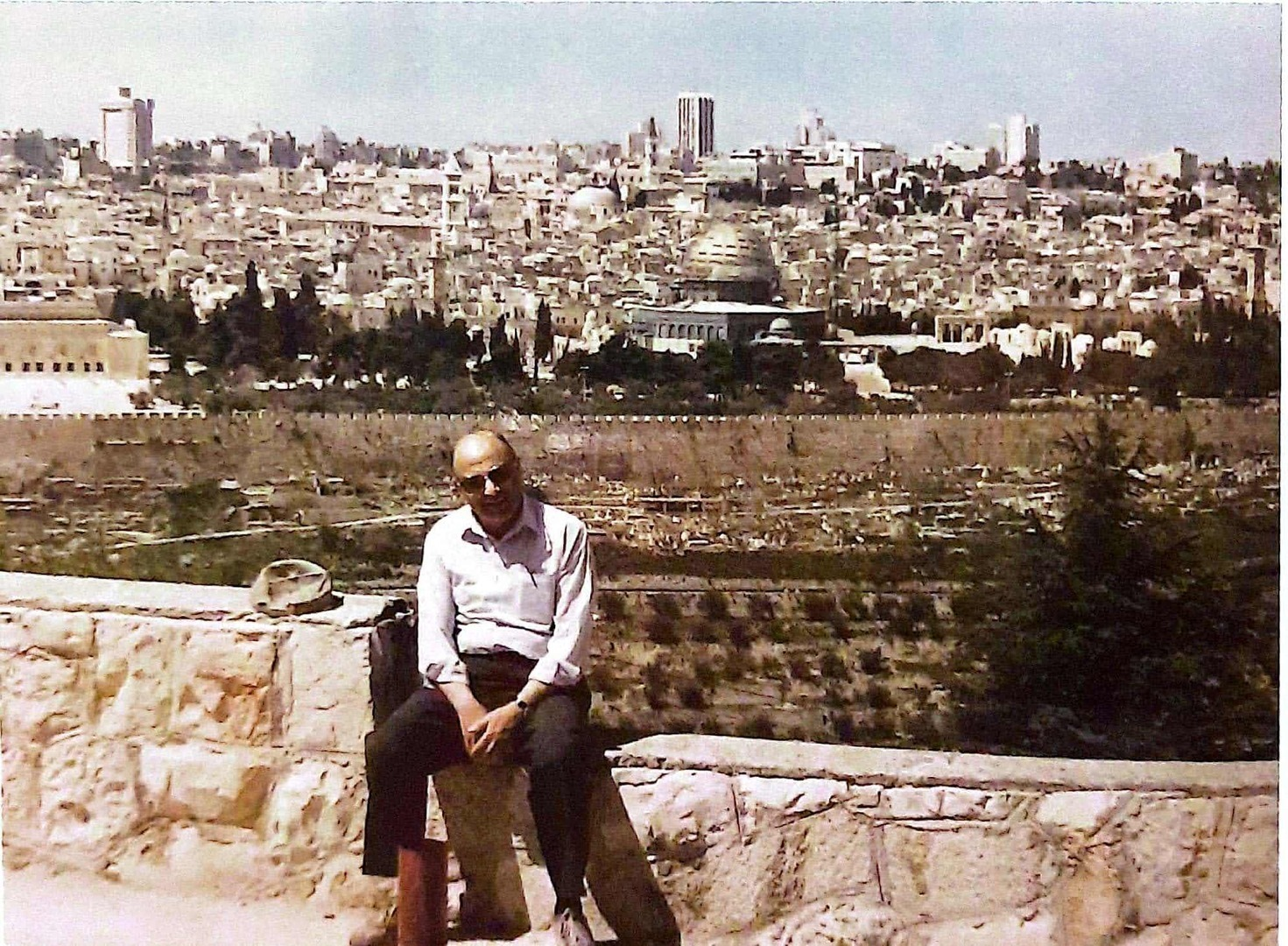
Hisham Khatib Jerusalem

== Early career ==
Upon returning to Jerusalem in 1959, after receiving his first B.Sc., he accepted an engineering position at the Jordan Jerusalem District Electricity Company (JJDEC). After completing his M.Sc. course, and continuing in his previous position for 4 years, he was appointed as Chief Engineer at JJDEC in 1966.

== Later career ==
In 1974, after receiving his Ph.D., he moved to Jordan where he worked as Deputy Director-General of the Jordan Electricity Authority. In 1976 he joined the Arab Fund for Economic and Social Development based in Kuwait as an Energy Expert. He returned to Jordan in 1980 to reclaim his position as the Director-General of the Jordan Electricity Authority. And was then also appointed as chairman of the board for the Jordan South Cement Company in 1982.

In 1984, Dr. Khatib was appointed as the first Minister of Energy and Mineral Resources in Jordan where he served until 1989. He then served as the Minister of Water and Irrigation from 1993 until 1994. Then, he served as Minister of Planning and International Cooperation from 1994 to 1995. In 2005 he was appointed as the first Chairman of the Energy and Minerals Commission where he served until 2009.

He was appointed to the 27th Jordanian Senate where he served from September 2016 to September 2020. He was a member of the Chairman of the Energy and mineral resources committee; Member of the Finance and Economics Committee; Member of the Palestine Committee.

He was appointed as chairman of the board of trustees for the Al-Balqaʼ Applied University in 2019 until he finally retired in 2021.

In between careers, he had a private consulting practice where he was contracted by numerous international agencies such as the United Nations Development Programme, the World Bank, the Arab Fund for Economic and Social Development, and many others.

== International Memberships and Affiliations ==
Dr. Khatib was very active internationally and a member of many committees and agencies all over the world, known for his diversified expertise in various fields of Engineering, Economics and Art. Dr. Khatib was a member of the following committees and agencies:

- Fellow of the Institute of Engineering and Technology (IET) in the UK
- Life Fellow of the Institute of Electrical and Electronics Engineers (IEEE) in the USA
- International Association for Energy Economics (IAEE) in the USA
- Palestine Exploration Fund (PEF)
- Association for the Study of Travellers to Egypt and the Near East (ASTENE)
- International Council on Large Electric Systems (CIGRE)
- Vice Chairman and then Honorary Vice Chairman, of the World Energy Council (WEC) and World Energy Award Winner 2007
- World Federation of Scientific Workers
- Darat Al Funun Honorary Board

== Family ==
Hisham had three sisters Aida, Maha, and Ghada Khatib, of whom he is the oldest. In 1970, he married Maha Daher Al-Khatib.

He and Maha had three children: Mohammad, born in 1972, Lynn, born in 1975, and Isam, born in 1979. Mohammad married Ruwaida Share in 2004, and they had three sons; Hisham, Zaid, and Kareem. Isam married Dima Bilbaisi in 2006, and they had the children Jeeda, Kinan, and Naya.

== Art collection ==
Dr. Khatib was a philanthropist of the arts and heritage, supporting many local and international organizations, including Darat al Funun, Tiraz Centre, and the Palestine Exploration Fund. Over 60 years, he personally collected an extensive collection of art from all over MENA (Middle East and North Africa), especially the Holy Land (Jerusalem), containing a variety of books, manuscripts, maps, photographs, paintings, Qurans, and many others. Using this collection, Hisham was able to preserve the Arab and Palestinian cultural heritage and knowledge for the coming generations, publishing 7 books on his collection, including:

- “The Holy Land: Palestine and Egypt Under the Ottomans” I.B. Tauris, UK, 2003
- “Palestine and Jordan 1500 – 1900” Darat al Funun, The Khalid Shoman Foundation, Jordan, 2005
- “Jerusalem, Palestine, and Jordan” Gilgamesh Publishing, UK, 2013
- “Panoramic Jerusalem” Pro-Jerusalem Society, 2015
- “Wild Flowers of Palestine and Jordan” Private Edition, 2016
- “Valuable Printed Books and Manuscripts in the Khatib Collection” Private Edition, 2019
- “A Voyage to Jerusalem” Reprint of a manuscript from 1901, 2019

== Other publications ==
Outside of art, Dr. Khatib was also a persevering scientist and economist, making other publications with the Institution of Engineering and Technology (IET) about economic evaluations in the electricity supply industry, broadening his range of expertise even further. These publications include:

- “Financial and economic evaluation of projects in the electricity supply industry” IET, 1998
- “Economic Evaluation of Projects in the Electricity Supply” IET, 2003
- “Economic Evaluation of Projects in the Electricity Supply Industry (3rd Edition)” IET, 2014

These publications, of course, do not include the countless articles on electrical engineering, economics, art, and many other topics found across many industries.

His final publication was his memoirs, titled “86 and still going… Slowly”, published in 2020, two years before his passing on the 31st of May 2022. In these memoirs, reserved for his friends, family, and loved ones, Dr. Khatib details intimate and personal details about his life, from beginning to end, teaching his grandchildren about their heritage, and highlighting the importance of family.
