= Mendel Diness =

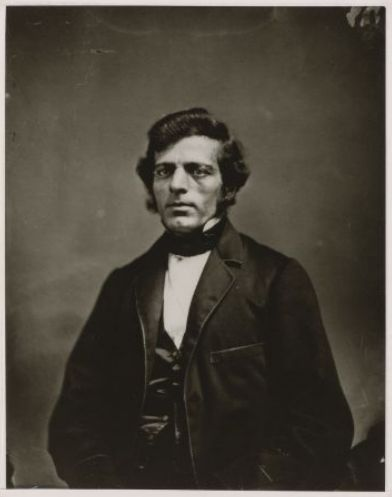
- by Mendel Diness, 1856
- Born: 1827; Odessa
- Died: December 1901 (aged 73–74); Port Townsend, Washington
- Occupation: Photographer
- Known for: Early photographs of Jerusalem

Mendel Diness (1827 in Odessa – December 1, 1900 in Port Townsend, Washington) was a Jewish watchmaker in 19th century Jerusalem who studied photography under the Scottish missionary and photographer James Graham and during the 1850s became the first Jewish photographer in Jerusalem.

Diness arrived in Jerusalem in Ottoman Palestine in 1848, where he eventually converted to Christianity, receiving the additional baptism name of John, after which he was divorced by his wife and lost his business due to boycotts by local Jews.

Around 1859-60 Diness relocated to the United States, changed his name to Mendenhall John Dennis, and became a minister and lecturer.

The early photographs of Diness and his mentor, James Graham, were the subject of an exhibition at Yeshiva University Museum at the Center for Jewish History from December 4, 2007 until April 6, 2008.
