= IEC Tower =

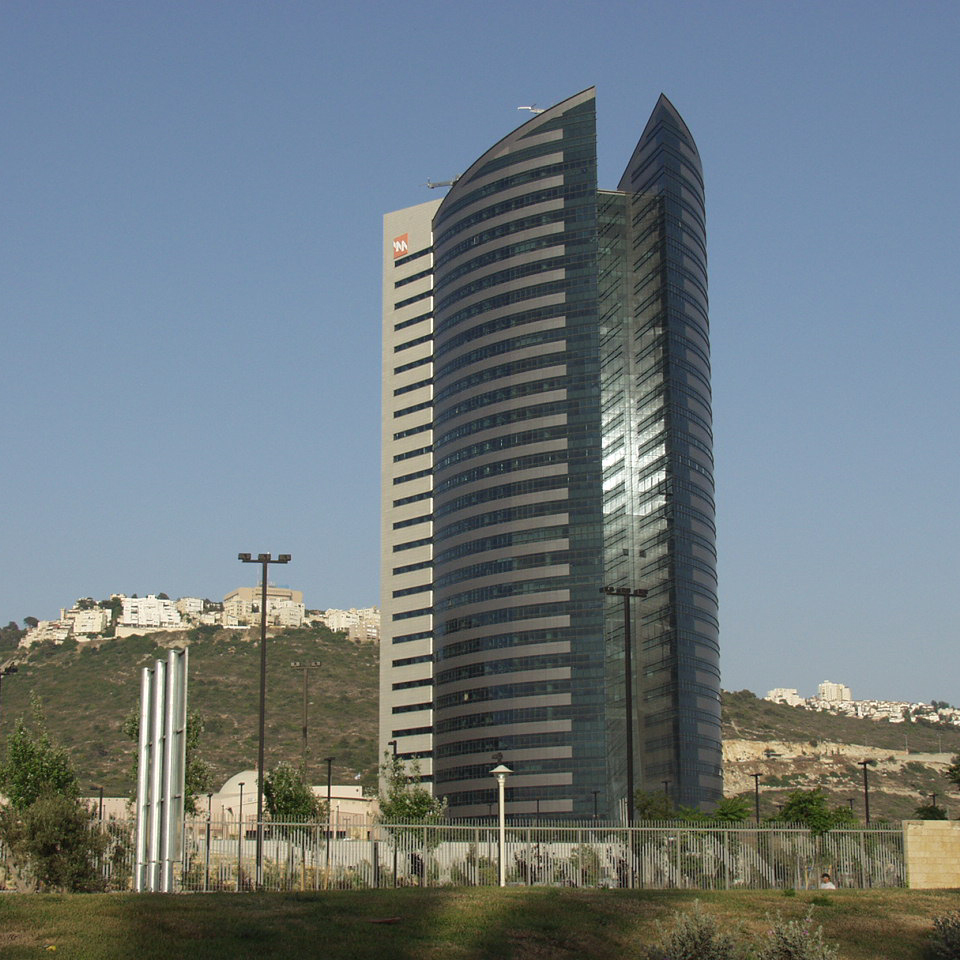
- The IEC Tower
- Interactive map of the IEC Tower area

General information
- Status: Completed
- Type: Offices
- Location: Haifa, Israel
- Coordinates: 32°47′17″N 34°57′53″E
- Opening: 2003
- Cost: $90 million

Height
- Roof: 130 m (430 ft)

Technical details
- Floor count: 30

Design and construction
- Architects: Rozov-Hirsch Architects; Mansfeld Kehat Architects

The IEC Tower is a skyscraper located in Haifa, Israel.

At 130 meters in height and at 30 floors is the second tallest building in the city and the thirteenth tallest in Israel. Completed in 2003, the IEC Tower was designed by Rozov-Hirsch Architects and Mansfeld Kehat Architects and is the tallest building in Israel to serve only one company, the Israel Electric Corporation who moved their headquarters here from Tel Aviv. It is also Haifa's tallest office building. The tower is located near the MATAM business park which is outside of the CBD of Haifa, and in terms of roof height is actually Haifa's tallest tower, overtaking the Sail Tower.

== See also ==
- Architecture of Israel
- Economy of Israel
