= First Jordan Hydro-Electric Power House =

Was an electric power plant in Jordan

Coordinates: 32.6334°N 35.5687°E

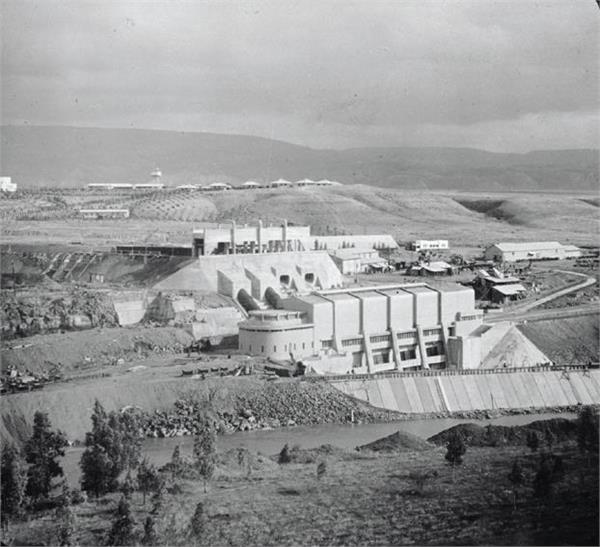
circa 1935

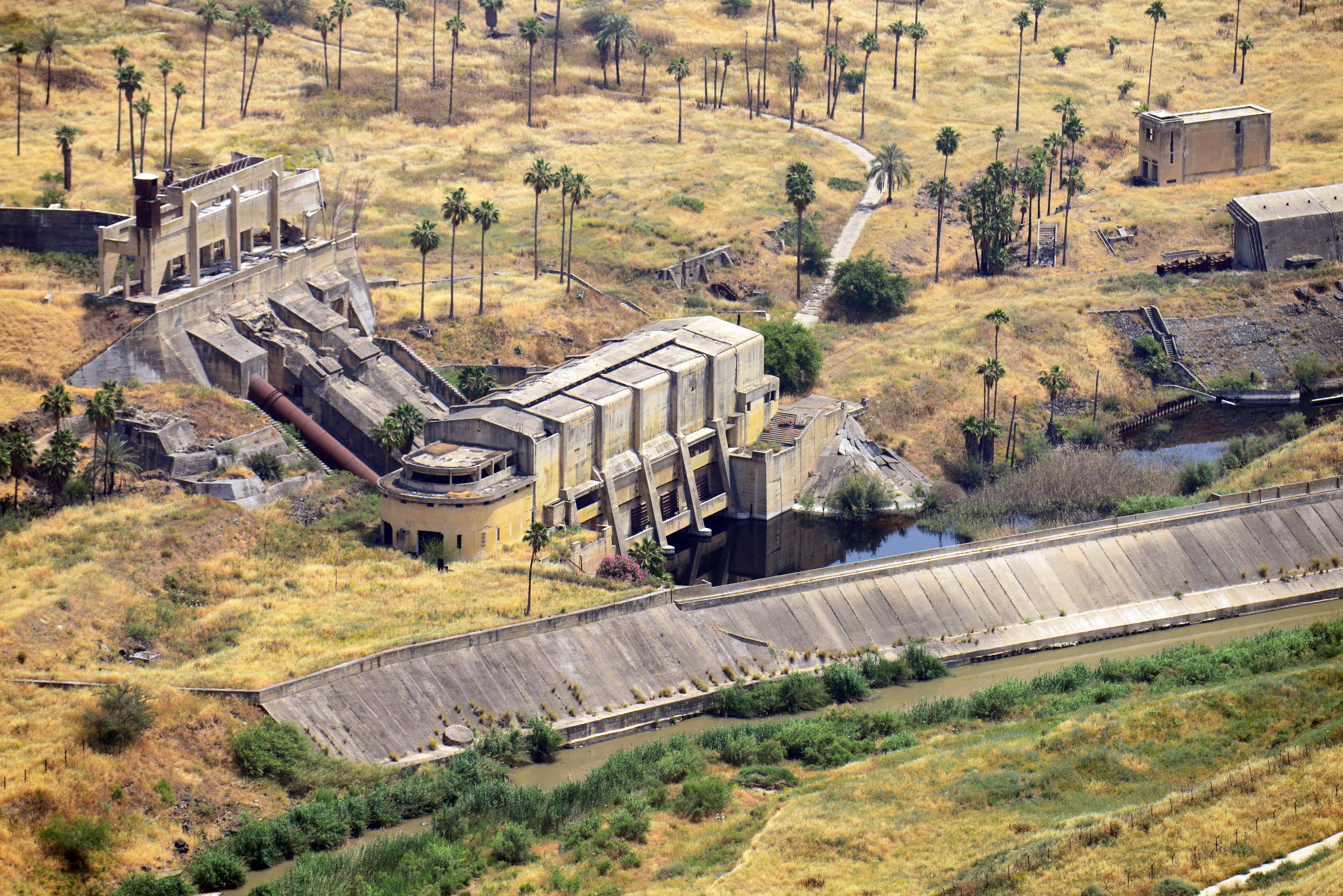
2013

Rutenberg's power station, known as the "First Jordan Power House"

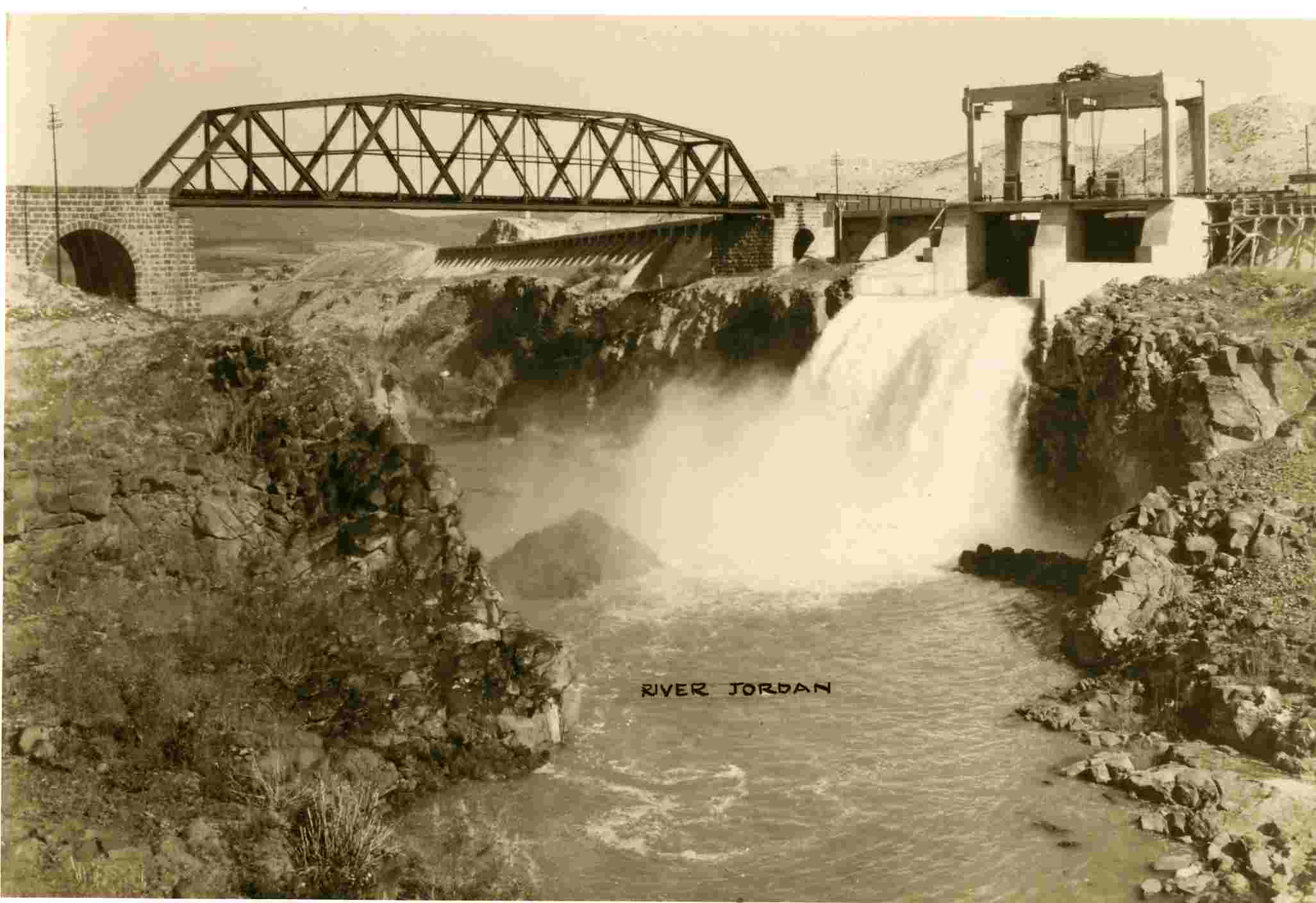
circa 1933

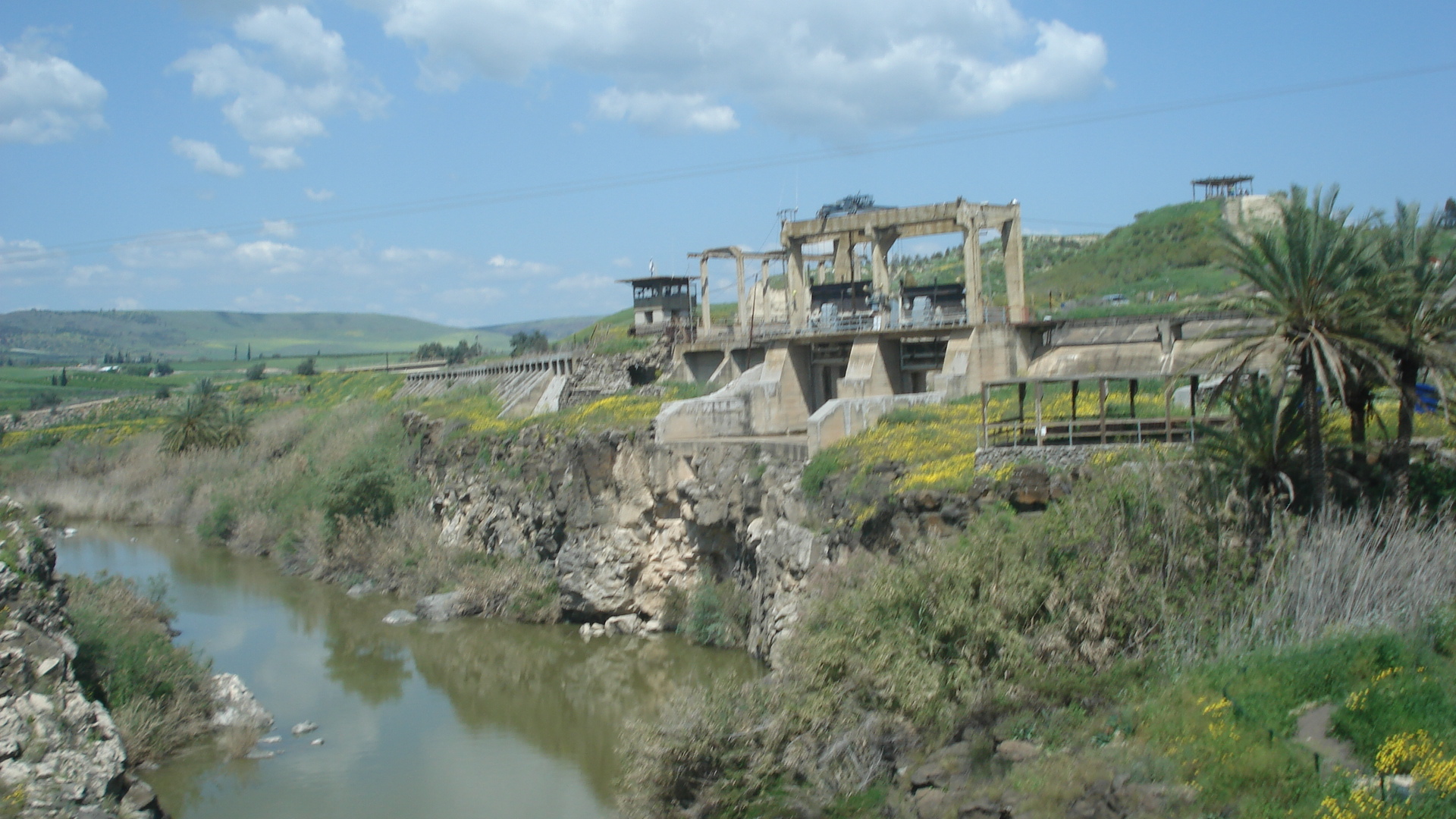
2009

Yarmouk Lake Dam

The First Jordan Hydro-Electric Power House, also known as the Rutenberg Power Station or the Naharayim Power Plant or the Tel Or Power Plant, was a conventional dammed hydroelectric power station on the Jordan river, which operated between 1932 and 1948. It was situated in the Emirate of Transjordan (modern Jordan), but built to supply power to Mandatory Palestine (modern Israel). The plant was built in an area known as Jisr el-Majami, later renamed by Pinhas Rutenberg's Palestine Electric Corporation as Naharayim, and following the Israel–Jordan peace treaty it is today part of the Jordanian area of Baqoura.

The plant was constructed – under concession from the Mandatory government – by the Palestine Electric Corporation based on a plan put forward in 1926. It followed his original 1920 Rutenberg plan to build ten reservoirs and fourteen hydroelectric plants on the Jordan river. Financial capital for the project came from the worldwide Jewish community, organized with limited publicity in order to allow Rutenberg to be presented as an "entrepreneur" rather than part of the Zionist Organization.

== Concession ==
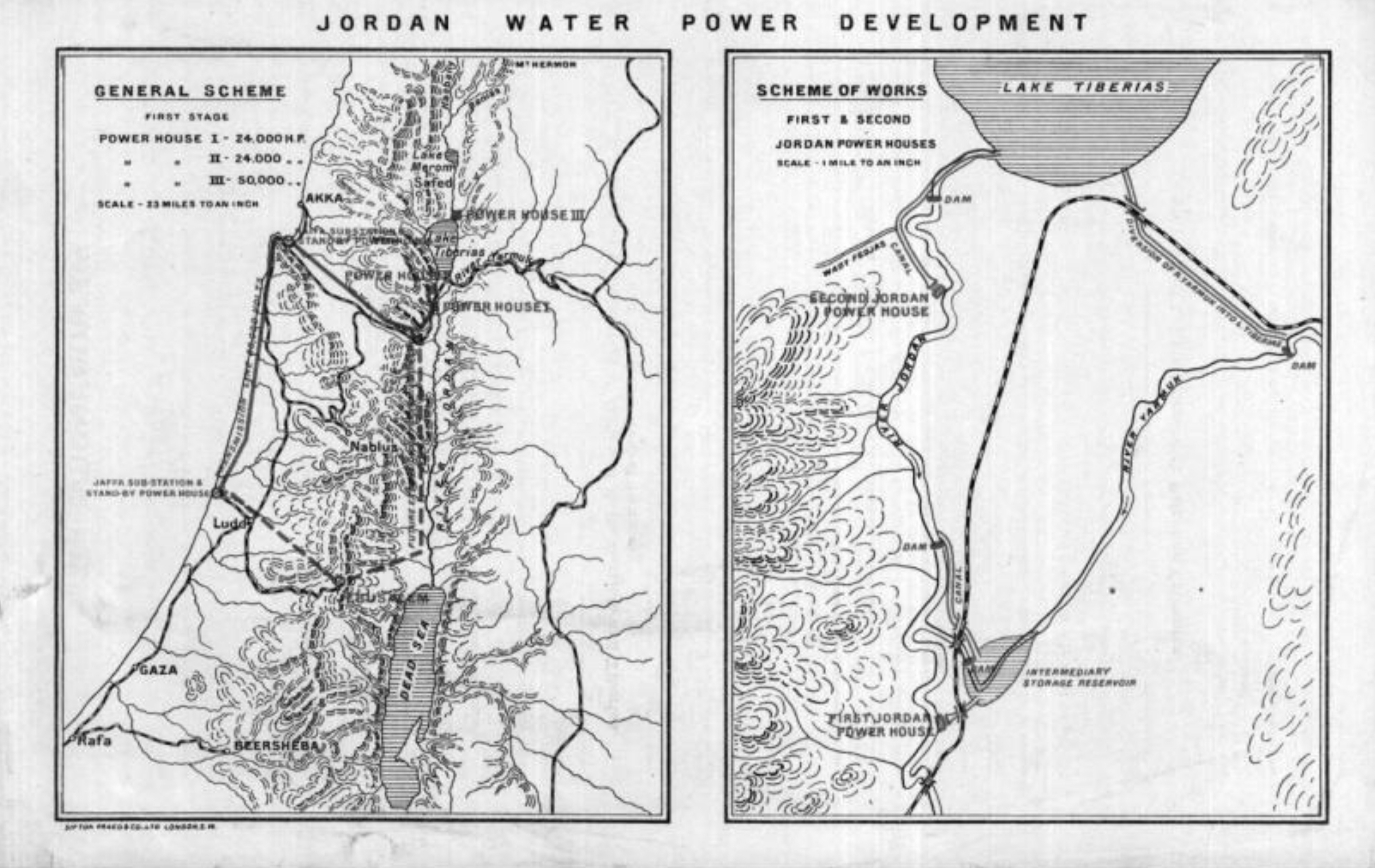
Palestine Electric Company: Plans for the three power stations across the region

On 8 December 1920, Pinhas Rutenberg submitted a 60 page proposal to the British government, proposing to build 14 hydroelectric power stations along the Jordan River On 21 September 1921, a concession agreement was signed between the British Government and Rutenberg granting him a monopoly over "utilization of such of the waters of the River Jordan and its basin including the Yarmuk River and all other affluents" and a right to "erect a power house near Jisr-el-Mujamyeh". This agreement required Rutenberg to form a company with at least GBP1 million of capital within two years; such company was formed, named the Palestine Electric Corporation (PEC). The concession was then formalized on 5 March 1926 for a 70-year period and validated in Mandatory Palestine by the Electricity Concessions Ordinance 1927 and in the Emirate of Transjordan by the Electricity Concession Law, 1928.

The political and financial backing for the project came almost entirely from Zionist organizations and Jewish philanthropists, among them the Jewish Colonial Trust and the Rothschild-funded Palestine Jewish Colonization Association, while Rufus Isaacs (Lord Reading) sat on the company's board representing several British trusts. American Jewish investors took part in June 1926 via the Palestine Economic Corporation and agreed to advance about $750,000 toward completing the works.

== Construction ==
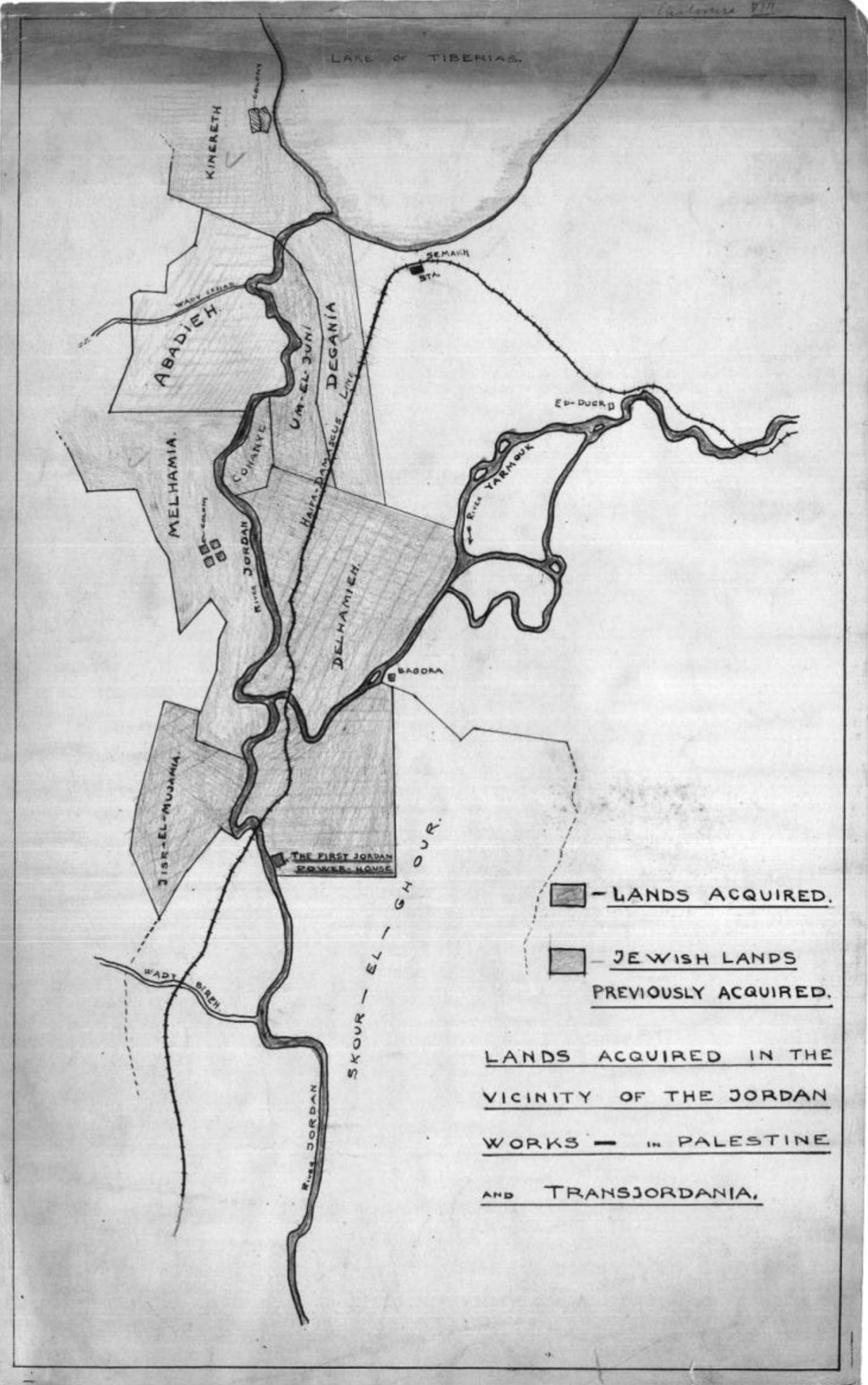
Jewish-owned lands in the area useful to the project (previous acquisitions, and additional ones made by the PEC)

The plant was constructed between 1926 and 1933. About 3000 workers were employed during the construction. Rutenberg's original proposal explained that the location near Jisr el-Majami was the only site on which it was "possible to begin construction of a powerhouse immediately", due to the required proximity to the Sea of Galilee (which would act as a natural reservoir) and because it represented the location which had been most densely settled by Jews. The choice of the location influenced the ongoing Anglo-French discussions over the location of the mandatory borders, which became the Paulet–Newcombe Agreement. A similar dynamic appeared in the finalization of the eastern border with respect to what became known as the "Semakh triangle".

== Operation ==
The plant operated between 1932 and 1948. The opening ceremony took place on 9 June 1932, attended by Emir Abdullah I of Jordan and British officials including the High Commissioner Arthur Grenfell Wauchope, Colonel Charles Henry Fortnom Cox, and Sir Steuart Spencer Davis.

The plant ceased operations following the 1948 Arab-Israeli war. It was captured and looted by the Iraqi Army on 14 May 1948. Transjordan had a secret agreement with Israel regarding protection of the works. United States Chargé d'affaires Wells Stabler reported in a confidential despatch that when the Iraqi army arrived, the Israeli operators of the plant blew up some of the electricity generators (alternators) in the plant and the plant was subsequently looted by the Iraqi troops. Thirty-eight workers were captured; they were released only after the Armistice Agreements were signed on 3 April 1949. Stabler's despatch on 11 July 1949, written after a visit to the site, read:

It is understood that prior to the hostilities In May 1948, the Jordan Government and the Jewish Agency reached some form of agreement concerning the protection of the Hydro-Electric works. It is possible that the Jordan Government would have been able to observe this agreement if it had not been for the arrival of the Iraqi forces. When the Iraqi forces came into the area, the Israelis departed, but only after blowing up certain of the dynamos in the main dynamo building. Later the Iraqi finished the job, even removing numerous machines.... The area has been under the control of the Arab Legion since the departure of the Iraqi troops three months ago. All looting and damage has been stopped by the Legion and the area is under guard. ... It is quite obvious that the Rutenberg Hydro-Electric works can only be operated again by an agreement between Jordan and Israel. Jordan, on its part, is incapable of operating such a works by itself and, moreover, the Israelis can control the flow of the Jordan. Israel, on the other hand, cannot commence operations of the works as all the buildings are in Jordan territory. In addition, Jordan can control the flow of the Yarmuk River. It would appear that it would take some time yet to reach an agreement on the operation of the Rutenberg Hydro-Electric works as it remains, along with the Dead Sea Potash Works, an important bargaining point for Jordan.

== 1948 proposals to reopen ==
Various proposals were made for cooperation between Israel and Jordan regarding the use of the Jordan river in the wake of the 1948 war. After an armistice agreement was signed PEC executives proposed to open the plant but the Jordanian king refused. Proposal to apply the seven-state Tennessee Valley Authority scheme to the area was submitted to the United Nations in 1953, stating:

Near the junction of the Jordan and Yarmuk Rivers is located the Tel Or hydroelectric plant with an installed capacity reported to be about 18,000 kilowatts. It was designed to use waters of both of these rivers, and to make use of Lake Tiberias for storage purposes. The unified development of the Jordan Valley waters giving primary consideration to irrigation uses will result in diverting most of the Yarmuk and Jordan waters from the Tel Or plant and will make its operation entirely in-feasible. It is at present reported to be incapable of being operated, and its repair and replacement for permanent service seems to be entirely unjustified, if the overall plan herein proposed is to be followed. The plant might be repaired and used during the development period as a temporary source of power for construction purposes.

— The Unified Development of the Water Resources of the Jordan Valley Region

== Tourism ==
After the Israel–Jordan peace treaty of 1994, the so-called "Peace Island" at the confluence of the Yarmuk and Jordan has become a tourist attraction, with plans to include visits to the actual power plant (the building with the turbines that lies south of Peace Island) sometime in the future. The 2019 cooling-down in the bilateral relations, with Jordan withdrawing the 25-year special arrangement for Naharayim/Baqoura, meant that the Peace Island became a no-go area for tourists, before any plans regarding the power plant were put into practice.

== Gallery ==
1921 Agreement for the Granting of a Concession for the Utilization of the Waters of the Rivers Jordan and Yarmuk and their affluents for generating and supplying Electrical Energy

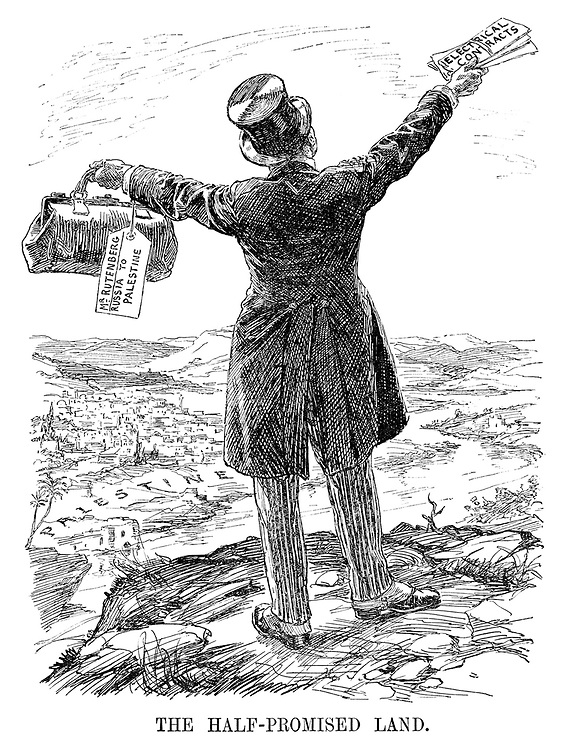
Rutenberg caricatured in Punch on 7 June 1922, whilst the concession was being actively discussed during the British House of Lords debates on the Mandate for Palestine.

1927 documents containing the concession as signed in 1926 and their passage into Palestinian law

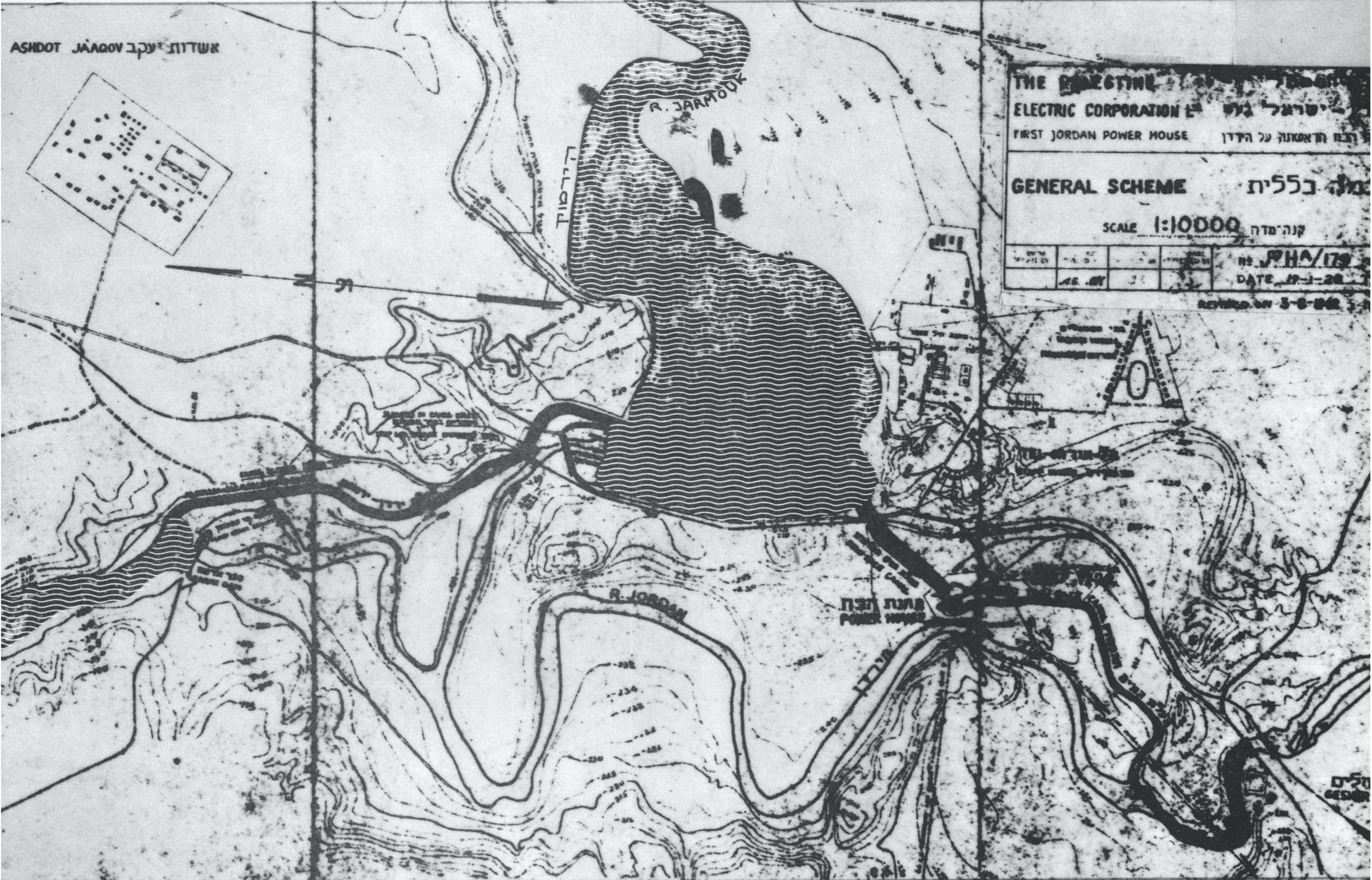
1928 General Scheme plan

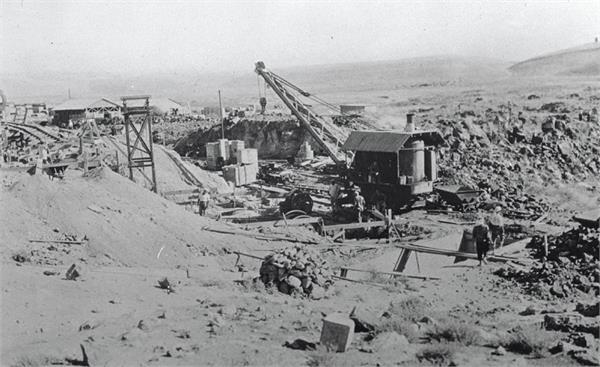
Under construction 1930

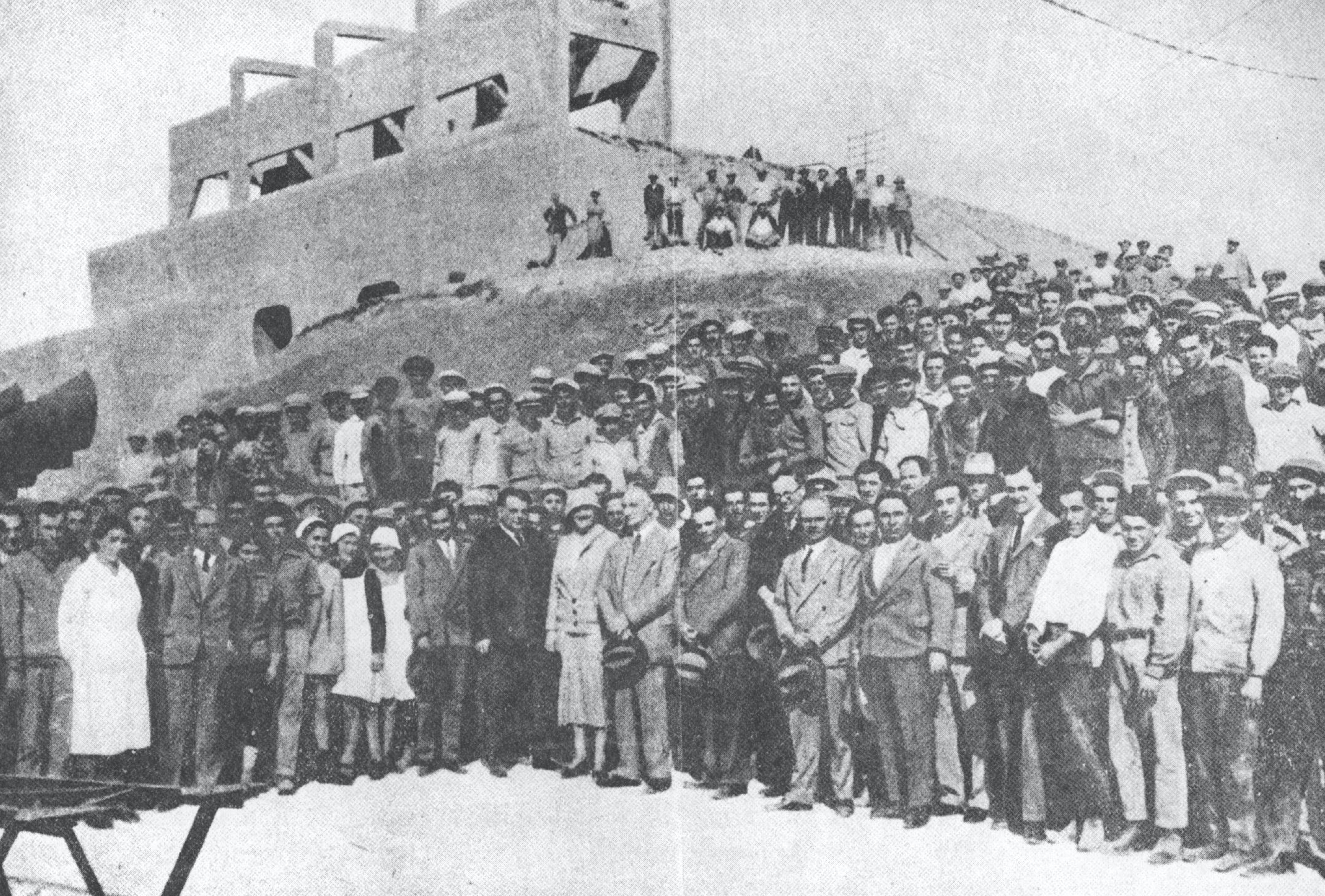
Opening ceremony

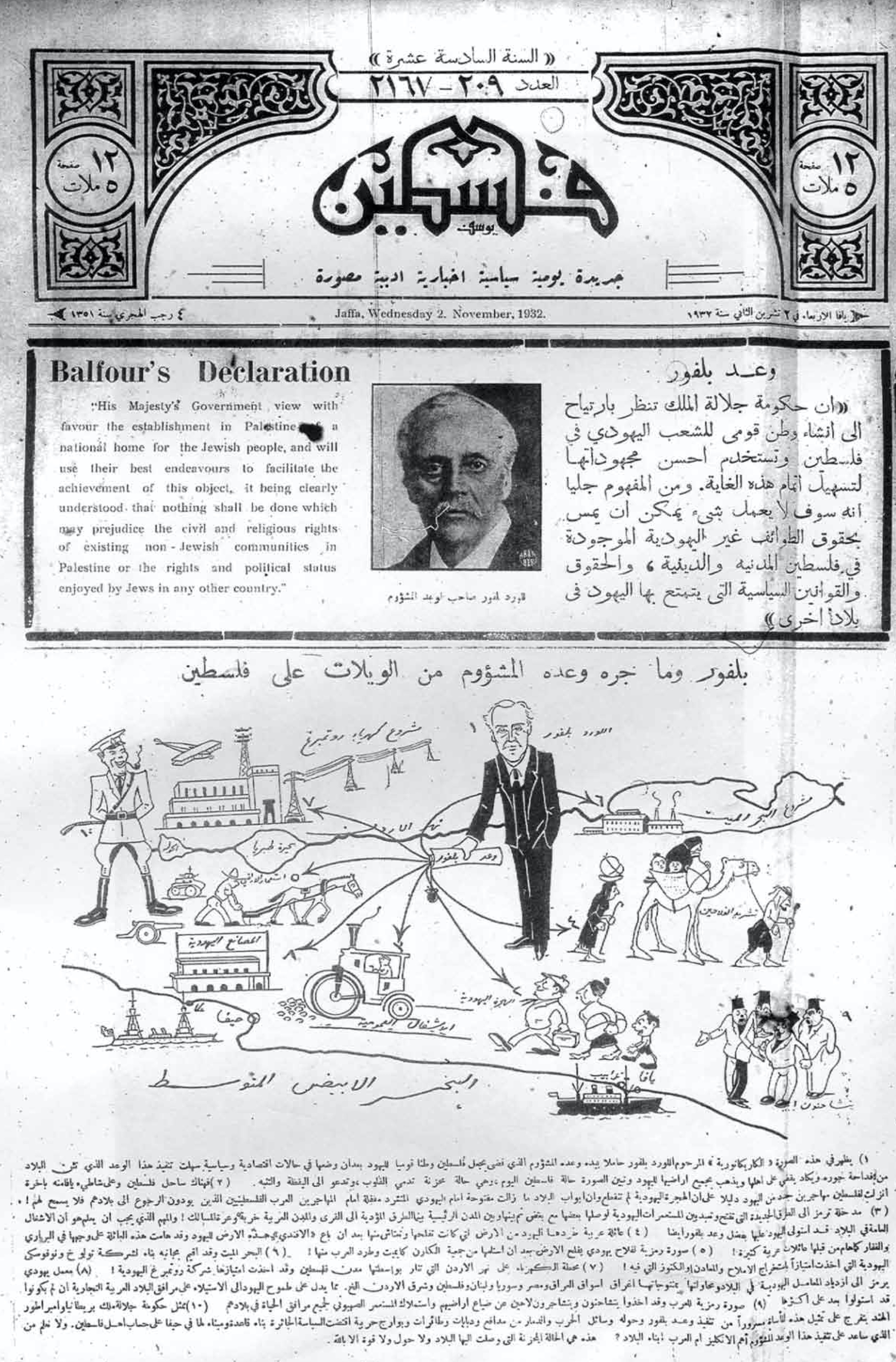
Front page of the Arabic newspaper Falastin on the 15th anniversary of the Balfour Declaration, 2 November 1932. The power plant is shown in the top left corner of the cartoon (Arabic: مشروع كهرباء روتنبرغ, romanized: Mashrue Kahraba' Rutenburgh, lit. 'Rutenberg Electricity Project')

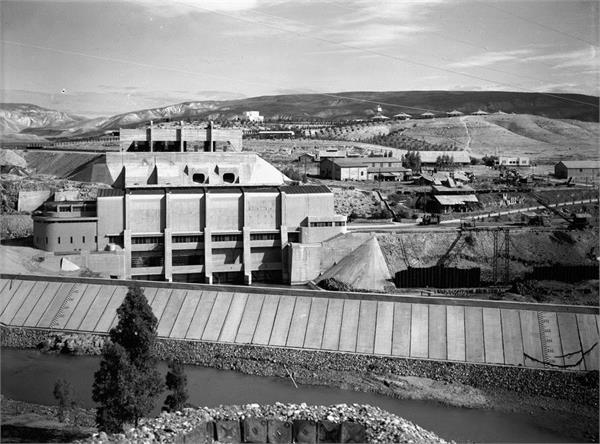
General view 1935

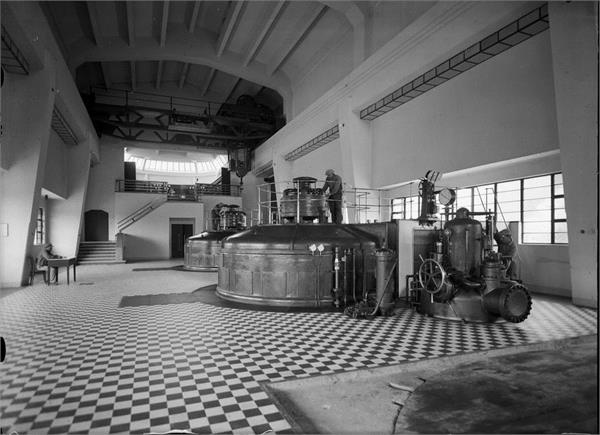
Interior of power station 1935

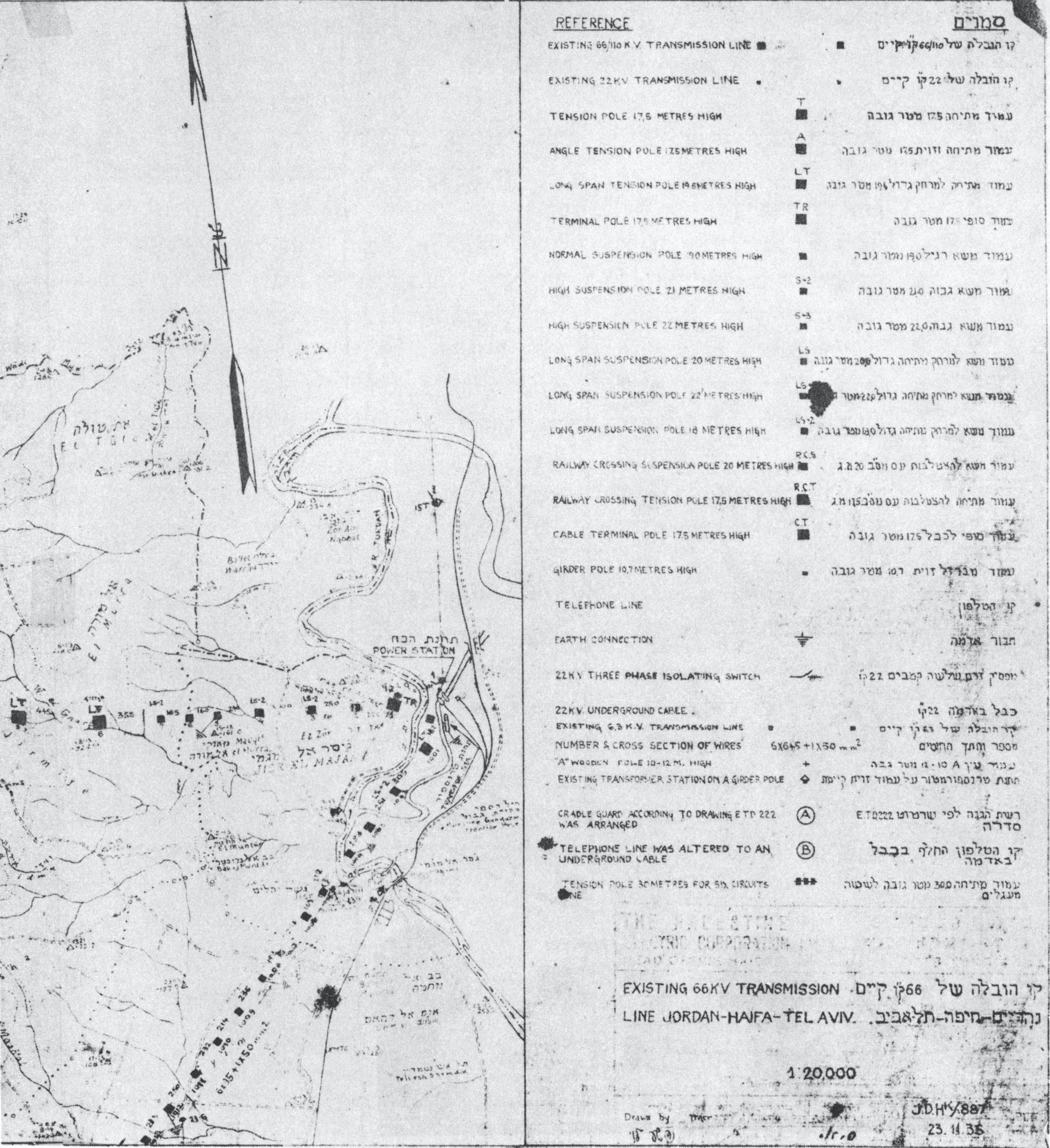
1936 diagram of the transmission lines leading from the plant

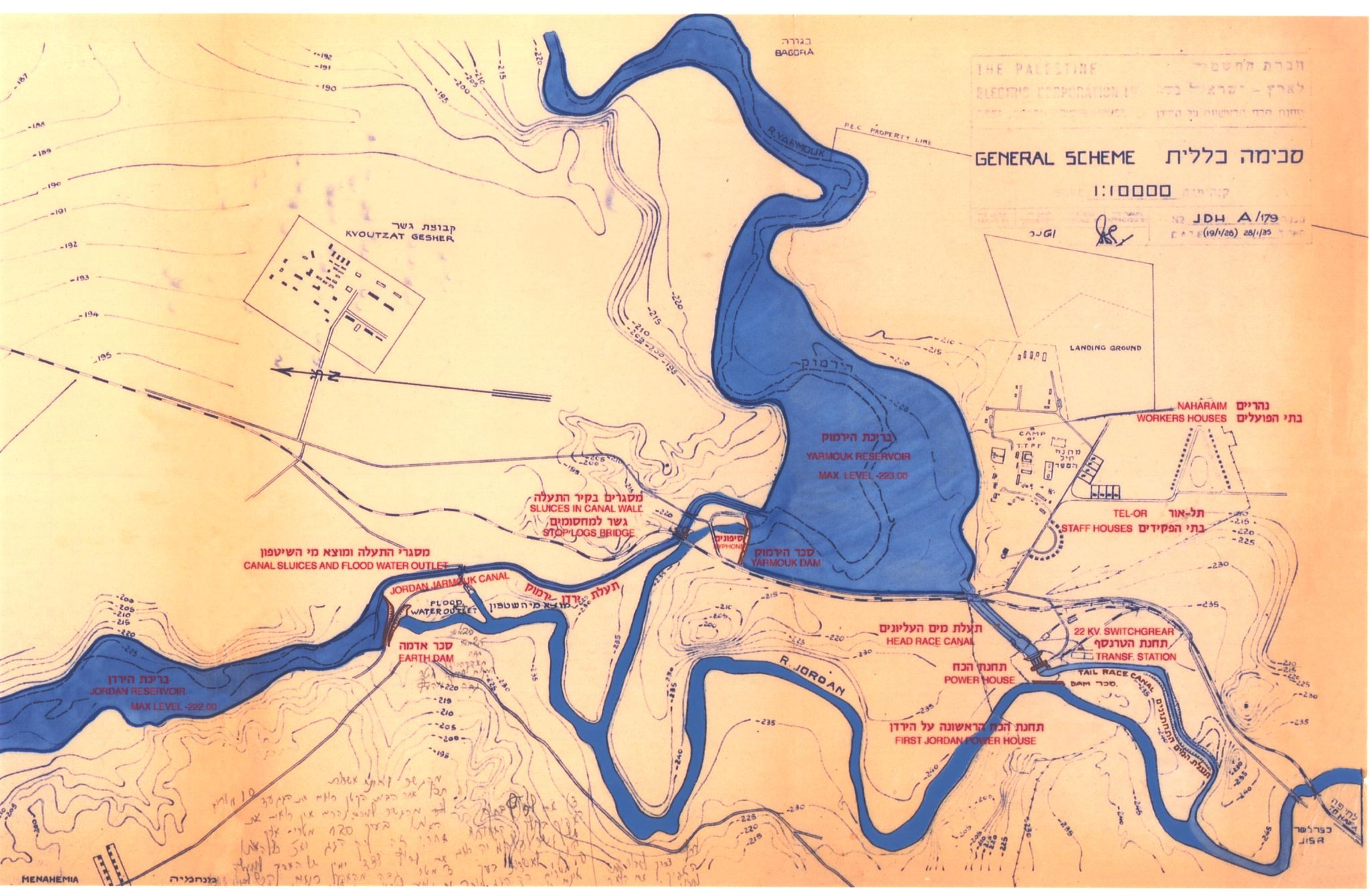
1935 General Scheme plan

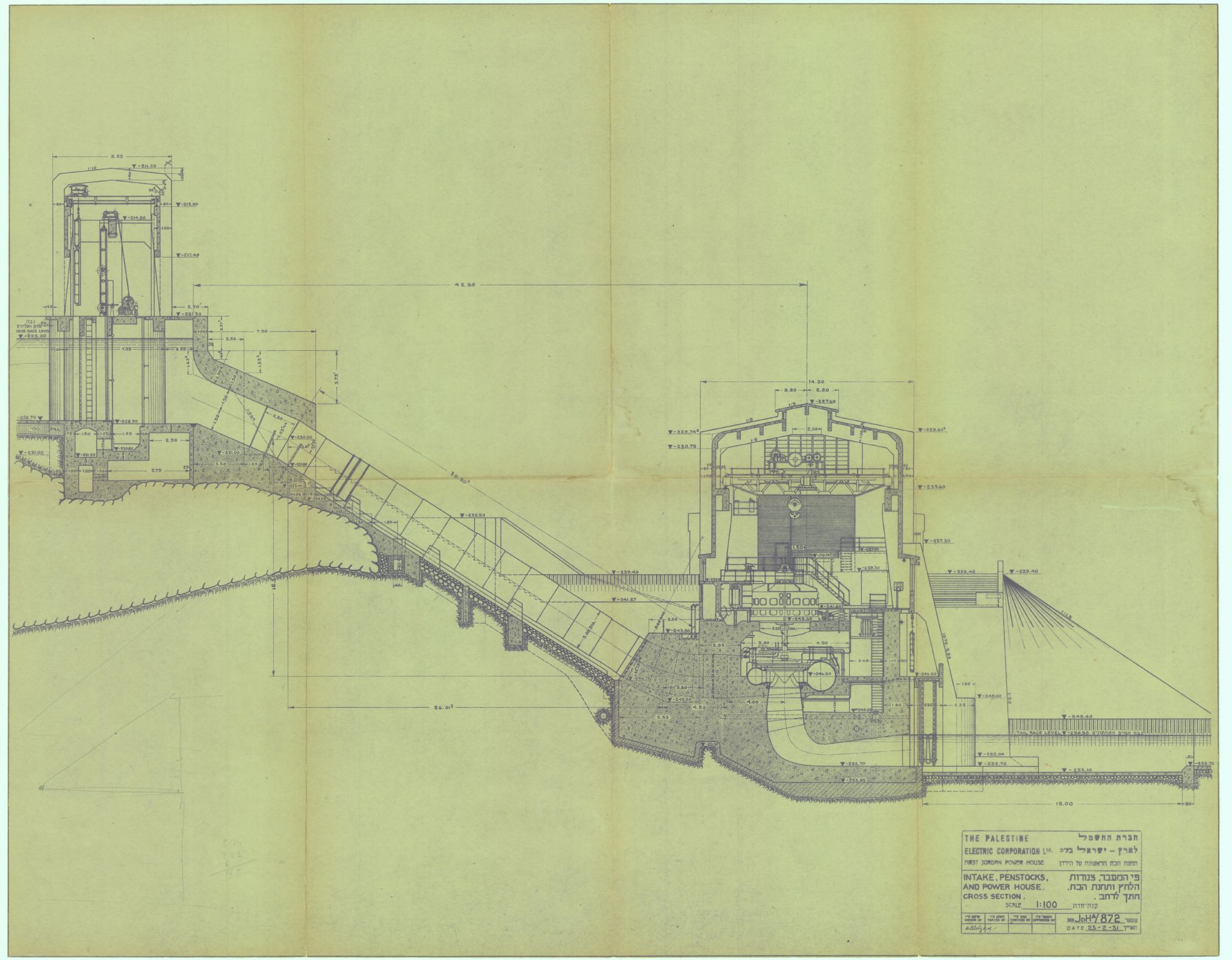
Cross section

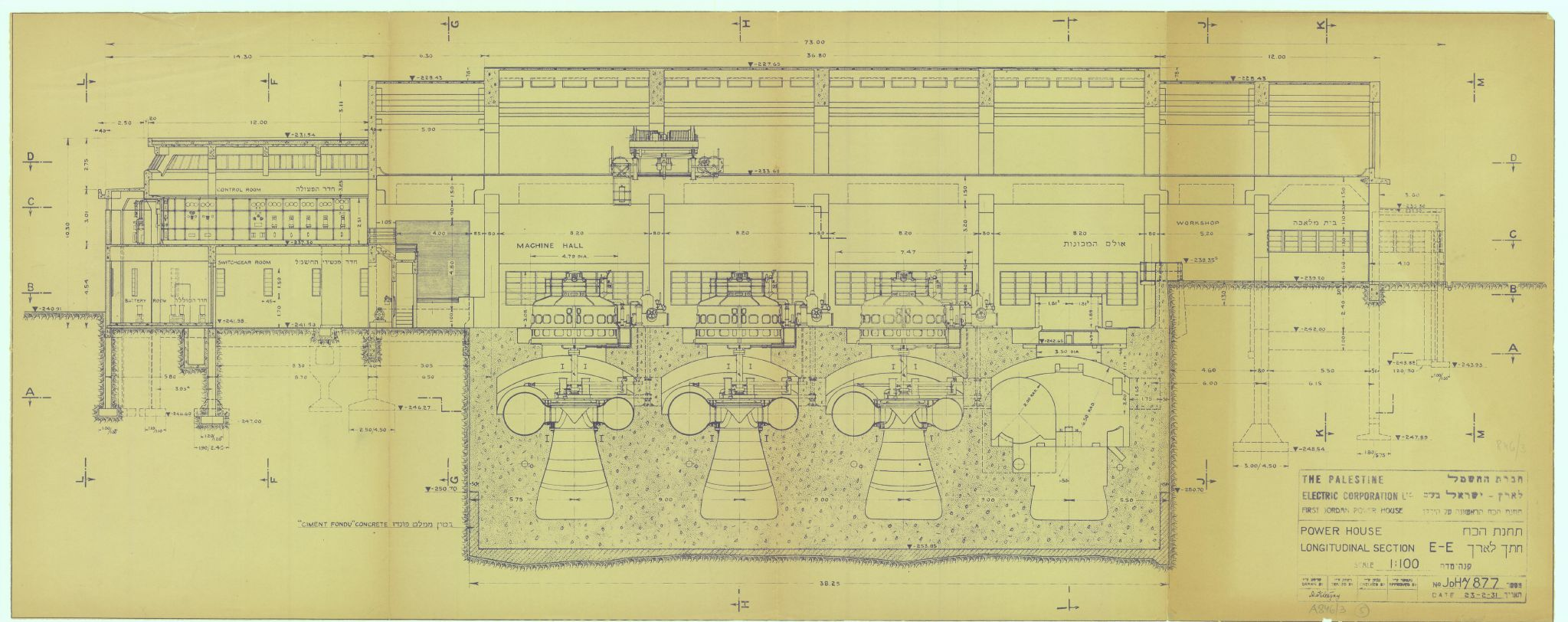
Longitudinal section

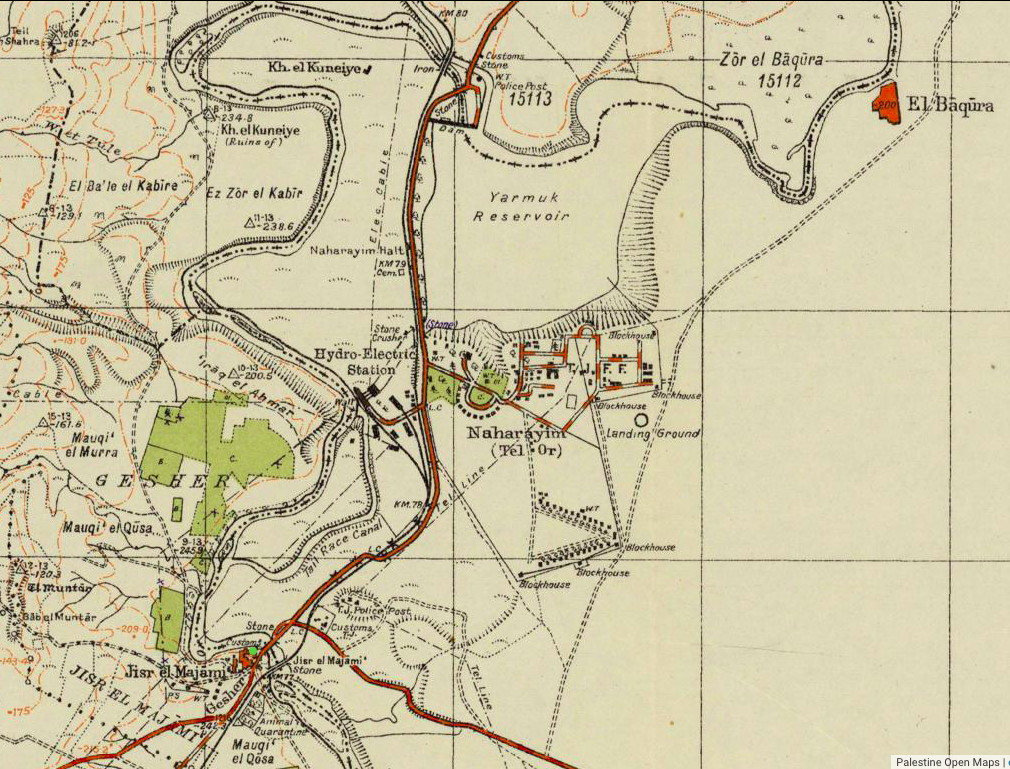
1940s Survey of Palestine map

== Relevant documents ==
- P. Rutenberg, "Water Resources of Palestine, I. Jordan Valley, Preliminary Project", a Confidential Report issued in Jerasalem, dated June 1920, bilingual (English and Hebrew), pp. 61 (Rutenberg proposal, 8 Dec. 1920, TNA CO 733/9)
- The Crown Agents for the Colonies and Mr. Pinhas Rutenberg, "Agreement for the Granting of a Concession for the Utilization of the Waters of the Rivers Jordan and Yarmouk and Their Affluents for Generating and Supplying Electrical Energy", witnessed by Burchells Solicitors of Westminster, London; Herbert Oppenheimer Nathan and Vandyk, Solicitors, London; and Harry Sacher, Barrister at Law and Notary Public, Jerusalem, dated 21 September 1921.
- 5 March 1926 concession agreement
- "Official Gazette No. 177", Princedom of Transjordan, 1928.
- House of Commons discussions:
  - ELECTRIC POWER CONCESSION, HC Deb 07 November 1921 vol 148 cc41-2
  - CONCESSIONS. PALESTINE (MR. RUTENBERG), HC Deb 31 May 1922 vol 154 cc2119-20W

== Bibliography ==
- Meiton, Fredrik (15 January 2019). Electrical Palestine: Capital and Technology from Empire to Nation. University of California Press. ISBN 978-0-520-96848-6.
- Meiton, Fredrik (2015). "The Radiance of the Jewish National Home: Technocapitalism, Electrification, and the Making of Modern Palestine". Comparative Studies in Society and History. 57 (4): 975–1006. doi:10.1017/S0010417515000419. S2CID 152010794.
- Shamir, Ronen (6 November 2013). Current Flow: The Electrification of Palestine. Stanford University Press. ISBN 978-0-8047-8868-7.
- Smith, Barbara J. (1 July 1993). "Monopoly Rights for Jewish Enterprise". The Roots of Separatism in Palestine: British Economic Policy, 1920-1929. Syracuse University Press. ISBN 978-0-8156-2578-0.
- Reguer, Sara (1995). "Rutenberg and the Jordan River: A Revolution in Hydro-Electricity". Middle Eastern Studies. 31 (4): 691–729. doi:10.1080/00263209508701076. JSTOR 4283757.
