= Economy of Mandatory Palestine =

Development between 1920 and 1948

Economy of Mandatory Palestine refers to the economy and financial development of the British Mandatory Palestine between 1920 and 1948.

Between 1922 and 1947, the annual growth rate of the Jewish sector of the economy was 13.2%, mainly due to immigration and foreign capital, while that of the Arab was 6.5%. Per capita, these figures were 4.8% and 3.6% respectively. By 1936, the Jewish sector earned 2.6 times as much as Arabs. Compared to Arab countries, the Palestinian Arab individuals earned slightly more.

The country's largest industrial zone was in Haifa, where many housing projects were built for employees. Haifa was the location of the Haifa oil refinery, established in the 1930s, and the end point of the Kirkuk-Haifa oil pipeline, transporting oil from the Kingdom of Iraq.

The Jaffa Electric Company was founded in 1923 by Pinhas Rutenberg, and was later absorbed into a newly created Palestine Electric Company. Palestine Airways was founded in 1934, Angel Bakeries in 1927, and the Tnuva dairy in 1926. Electric current mainly flowed to Jewish industry, following it to its nestled locations in Tel Aviv and Haifa. Although Tel Aviv had by far more workshops and factories, the demand for electric power for industry was roughly the same for both cities by the early 1930s.

== Economic growth ==
Between 1922 and 1947, the annual growth rate of the Jewish sector of the economy was 13.2%, mainly due to immigration and foreign capital, while that of the Arab was 6.5%. Per capita, these figures were 4.8% and 3.6% respectively. By 1936, the Jewish sector earned 2.6 times as much as Arabs. Compared to Arab countries, the Palestinian Arab individuals earned slightly more.

On the scale of the UN Human Development Index determined for around 1939, of 36 countries, Palestinian Jews were placed 15th, Palestinian Arabs 30th, Egypt 33rd and Turkey 35th. The Jews in Palestine were mainly urban, 76.2% in 1942, while the Arabs were mainly rural, 68.3% in 1942. Overall, Khalidi concludes that Palestinian Arab society, while overmatched by the Yishuv, was as advanced as any other Arab society in the region and considerably more than several.

== Energy ==
=== Oil ===
The country's largest industrial zone was in Haifa, where many housing projects were built for employees. Haifa was the location of the Haifa oil refinery, which began operations in 1939, and the end point of the Kirkuk-Haifa oil pipeline, completed 1934, transporting oil from the Kingdom of Iraq.

=== Electricity ===
The Jaffa Electric Company was founded in 1923 by Pinhas Rutenberg, and was later absorbed into a newly created Palestine Electric Company. Electric current mainly flowed to Jewish industry, following it to its nestled locations in Tel Aviv and Haifa. Although Tel Aviv had by far more workshops and factories, the demand for electric power for industry was roughly the same for both cities by the early 1930s.

== Transport ==
=== Air transport ===
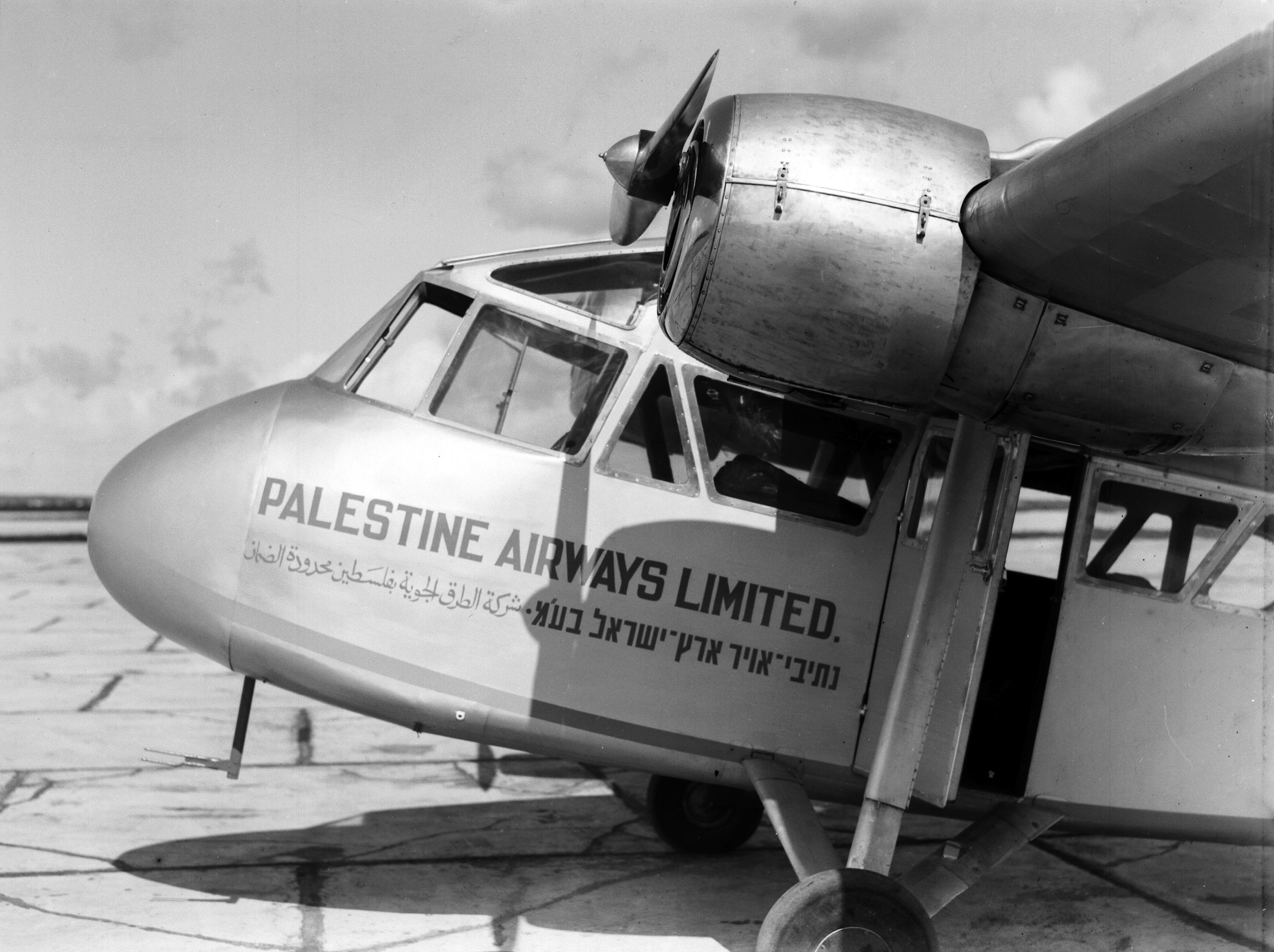
Palestine Airways airplane, 1934

Palestine Airways (also: Palestine Air Transport) was an airline founded by Zionist Pinhas Rutenberg in British Palestine, in conjunction with the Histadrut and the Jewish Agency. In 1937 the airline was taken over by British Government's Air Ministry, with the intention of it eventually being transferred back into private hands.

It operated from July 1937 until August 1940, under the aegis of the British corporation Imperial Airways.

=== Shipping ===
Until the beginning of the 20th century, Acre served as the main port for the region. However, the port eventually became clogged with silt, and was unable to accommodate large ships. The first person to comprehend the tremendous possibilities of a port in Haifa was Theodor Herzl, the father of Political Zionism, who in 1902 wrote a prophetic description of the town in his book AltNeuland. Construction of the port began in 1922, and it was officially opened on October 31, 1933 by Lieut. Gen. Sir Arthur Wauchope, the British High Commissioner for Palestine. The port allowed Haifa to blossom, and in 1936, the city had over 100,000 inhabitants. The port was a gateway for thousands of immigrants after the Second World War. The port had been the scene of the Patria disaster in 1940, which killed 267 people.

== See also ==
- Economy of Israel
- Economy of Jordan

== Bibliography ==
- Khalidi, Rashid (2006). The Iron Cage: The Story of the Palestinian Struggle for Statehood. Beacon Press. ISBN 978-0-8070-0308-4.
