= Palestine Economic Corporation =

Palestine Economic Corporation (PEC) was a public company originally incorporated in the United States, aimed at supporting the economic development of Palestine. It was formed in February 1925 with the merger of Palestine Co-operative Company with "capital from the offices of the Joint Distribution Committee".

In 1926, the corporation agreed to advance about $750,000 toward completing Pinhas Rutenberg's hydroelectric power station on the Jordan River. Its president was Bernard Flexner, and its board of directors included Louis Marshall, Herbert H. Lehman, Felix M. Warburg and the banana businessman Sam Zemurray.

== Early Investments and Operations ==
- Palestine Mortgage and Credit Bank Ltd.
- Central Bank of Co-operative Institutions in Palestine Ltd.
- Palestine Water Company Ltd.
- Bayside Land Corporation Ltd.
- Loan Bank Ltd.
