= Marius Michel Pasha =

French architect and lighthouse builder

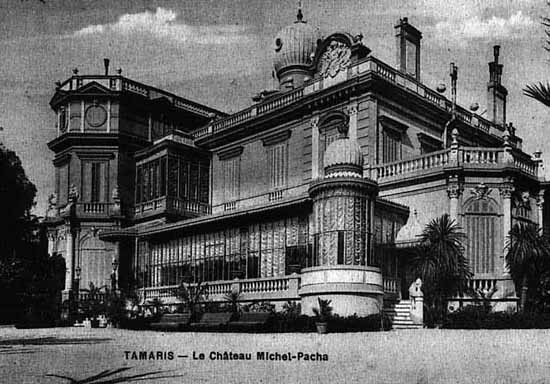
Marius Michel Pasha castle

Blaise-Jean-Marius Michel, Comte de Pierredon (16 July 1819 – 6 January 1907), also known as Michel Pasha or Michel Pacha in French, was a French architect and lighthouse builder.

== Early life ==
He was born in Sanary, near Toulon, Provence, in 1819. He became a merchant navy officer and traveled frequently between Marseille and the Near East for the company Messageries Imperiales.

== Lighthouse builder in the Ottoman Empire ==
Following a shipwreck accident in the eastern Mediterranean he was involved in, he wrote to the French Emperor Napoleon III (reigned 1848–1870), suggesting a network of lighthouses along the coasts of the Ottoman Empire. Napoleon, who was seeking to advance France's influence over the Ottoman Empire, put the proposal forward. Shortly before the end of the Crimean War (1853–1856) in 1855, the French ambassador at the Sublime Porte, Antoine Thouvenel convinced Sultan Abdülmecid I (reigned 1839–1861) to construct lighthouses along the Bosphorus.

Michel became head of the Ottoman Lighthouse Authority. After the building of a number of lighthouses, he established his own firm "Collas and Michel Co." with another officer, Camille Colas (1819–1898). In 1860, the company negotiated the first concession contract, which was in particular strategic interest for the Ottoman Empire.

The company built lighthouses and charged the vessels passing by for the lighthouse service. The fees were collected through offices in the Empire. The high profits, making 73% of the revenues with an average FF 3.6 million in the period from 1862 to 1913, were shared between the company owners and the Ottoman state. Within the first twenty years, almost a hundred lighthouses were built across the empire with lantern lenses imported from France.

Michel and Collas became very wealthy through this business. While Collas put his assets in the project of Jaffa–Jerusalem railway, Michel invested in a seaside resort at the French Riviera.

== Back in France ==
Returning to Sanary in 1872, he became Mayor, using part of his fortune to rebuild the harbor and the town church. In 1879, he came back to the Ottoman Empire, charged with rebuilding the harbor of Constantinople to modern design. In return, he obtained the honorary title of Pasha from Sultan Abdülaziz (reigned 1861–1876). He was further created a Chevalier of the légion d'honneur by the Republic in 1880, and Comte de Pierredon by Pope Leo XIII in 1882.

As mayor of Sanary, he planned to turn the nearby area of Tamaris into a fashionable modern resort. Michel died, however, without seeing his project completed. Tamaris was part built with a casino, hotels, a marina, grand houses and around 20 unique villas built. Tamaris was built to be a holiday resort for well to do Parisians. It remains a little-known but attractive and peaceful resort on the outskirts of La Seyne-sur-Mer.

Michel Pasha also made a donation to help biologist Raphaël Dubois, discoverer of the chemical nature of bioluminescence to found a marine biology station in Tamaris.
