= Israel Electric Corporation =

Israeli electricity company

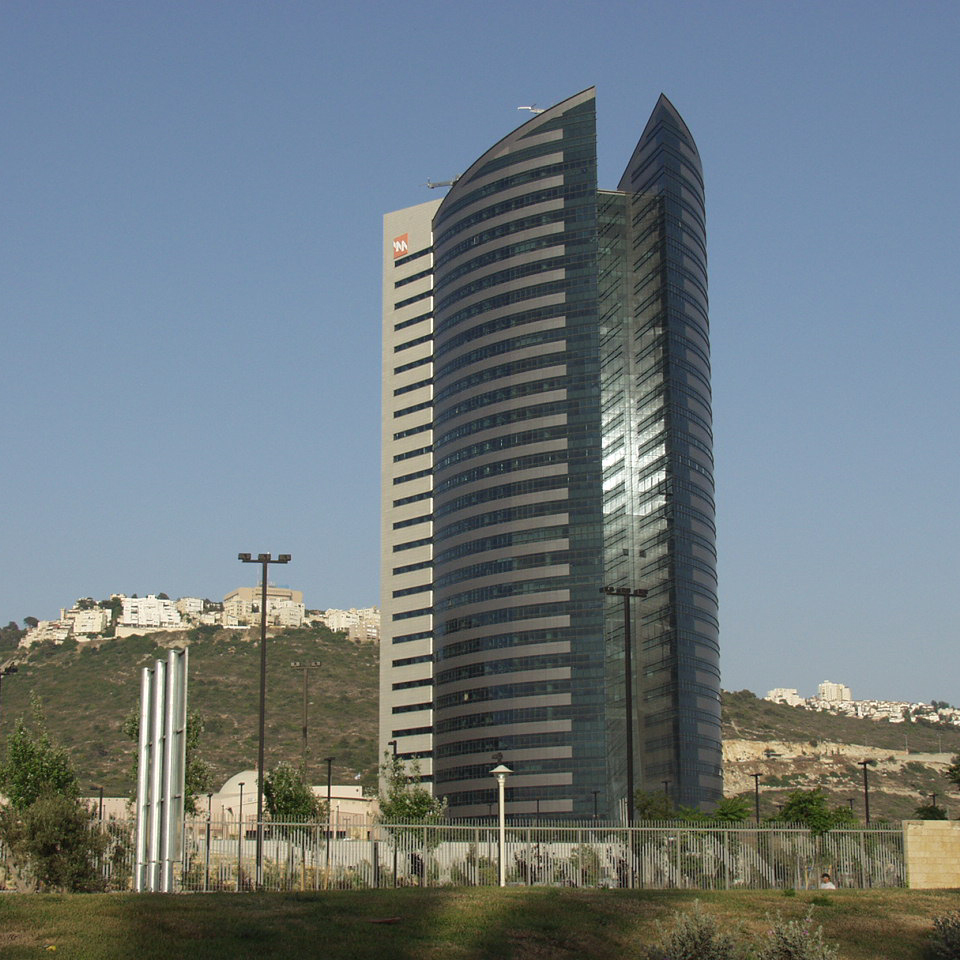
- IEC Tower, company's headquarters
- Type: Government-owned corporation
- Industry: Electric utilities
- Founded: 1923; 103 years ago
- Founder: Pinchas Rutenberg
- Headquarters: Haifa, Israel
- Area served: Israel
- Key people: Yiftah Ron-Tal (Chairman since 2011); Ofer Bloch (CEO)
- Products: Electricity generation, transmission and distribution
- Revenue: ₪ 27.7 billion (2013)
- Operating income: ₪ 1.4 billion (2013)
- Net income: ₪ (808) million (2013)
- Number of employees: 9,782 permanent employees 2,894 temporary employees
- Website: iec.co.il

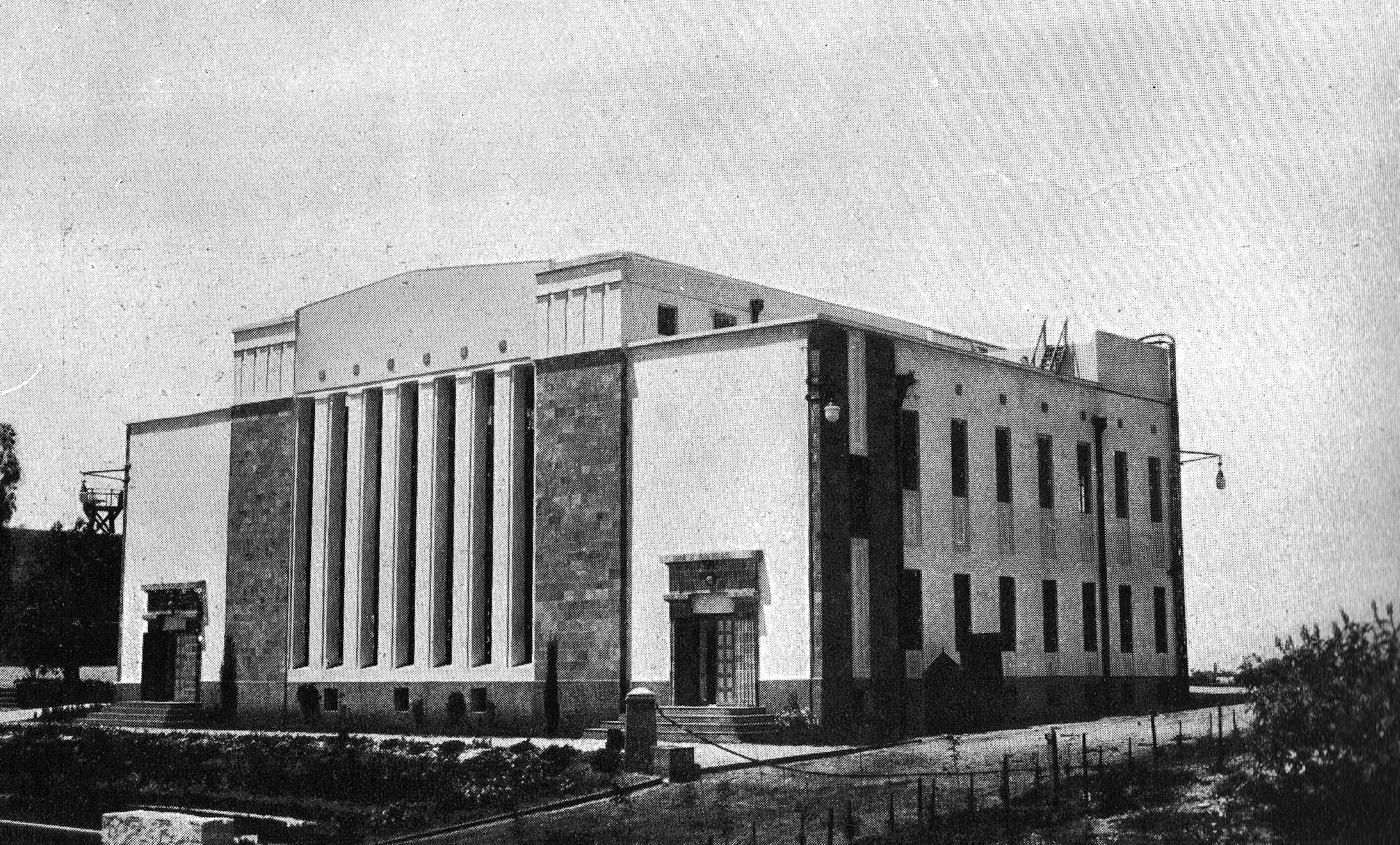
The first diesel-powered station in Tel Aviv, architect Joseph Berlin, built in 1923

Israel Electric Corporation (IEC; Hebrew: חברת החשמל לישראל) is the largest supplier of electrical power in Israel and the Palestinian territories. The IEC builds, maintains, and operates power generation stations, sub-stations, as well as transmission and distribution networks in Israel.

The company is the sole integrated electric utility in the State of Israel. Its installed generating capacity represents about 75% of the total electricity production capacity in the country. It transmits and distributes substantially all the electricity used in Israel, including power generated by other producers. The State of Israel owns approximately 99.85% of the company.

== History ==
=== Rutenberg Concession controversy ===
After British forces conquered Palestine, they had to deal with conflicting demands rooted in Ottoman rule. For example, on 27 January 1914, the city of Jerusalem had granted a Greek citizen, Euripides Mavromatis, concessions for the supply of water, electricity, and the construction of a tramway system in the city. Work under these concessions had not begun and by the end of the war the British occupying forces refused to recognize their validity.

Under the British administration, concessions from the Mandatory government were given. On 12 September 1921, the British formally signed the "Auja (or Yarkon) Concession" which granted Pinhas Rutenberg's Jaffa Electric Company a 70-year concession granting it exclusive rights to generate, distribute, and sell electricity in the administrative District of Jaffa, and authorized Rutenberg to generate electricity by means of hydroelectric turbines that would exploit the water power of the Auja (Yarkon) river. Historian Sahar Huneidi, building on the scholarship of Barbara J. Smith, underscores the 1921 concession's significance by noting that “[t]he economic separatism of the Yishuv...was given a tremendous push by the monopoly rights granted in 1921 to Pinhas Rutenberg."

Huneidi characterized the Rutenberg concession as "the largest and most politically controversial Zionist scheme" during the tenure of High Commission Herbert Samuel (1921–1924). "Its significance for the Zionists was to provide employment for the thousands of Jewish settlers, which would in turn 'justify' the influx of Jewish immigration." Indigenous leadership contested it on these grounds as unduly giving power to Zionists. Arab opposition proliferated based on this perception. Furthermore, attacks in the British press focused on the fact that Rutenberg was a "foreigner...who had bought the machinery for his project in Germany."

Euripides Mavromatis challenged the concession, claiming he was being deprived of his legal rights. The Mavromatis concession, despite British attempts to abolish it, covered Jerusalem and other localities (e.g., Bethlehem) within a radius of 20 km (12 miles) around the Church of the Holy Sepulchre. The case was taken up by Greece in at the Permanent Court of International Justice, but the ruling there in favor of Mavromatis was effectively undermined by the British Colonial Office.

=== Founding of Palestine Electric Corporation ===
In the end, Rutenberg's concessions remained and the company built a power plant that produced electricity using diesel-fueled engines. By 1923 Jaffa Electric Company's grid covered Jaffa, Tel Aviv, neighboring (mainly Jewish) settlements, and the British military installations in Sarafand.

In 1923, Rutenberg founded the Palestine Electric Corporation, Limited which was granted the "Jordan Concession". Rutenberg merged Jaffa Electric Company into that company, which in 1961 was renamed the Israel Electric Corporation Ltd. Rutenberg built the First Jordan Hydro-Electric Power House at Naharayim on the Jordan River, which opened in 1932. Pursuant to the Concessions, the company was granted the exclusive right to generate, supply and distribute electricity and to sell it throughout the Mandate for Palestine, except in Jerusalem and its environs. The plant produced much of the energy consumed in Mandatory Palestine until the 1948 Palestine war. Other power plants were built in Tel Aviv, Haifa, and Tiberias.

Jerusalem was the only part of Mandatory Palestine not supplied by Rutenberg's plants. Mavromatis defended the concession for Jerusalem granted to him by Ottoman authorities, and resisted Rutenberg's attempts to build a power station that would serve Jerusalem. Only in 1942, when his British-Jerusalem Electric Corporation failed to supply the demands of the city, did the Mandatory government ask the Palestine Electric Company to take over the supply of electricity to Jerusalem.

The Concessions expired after 70 years, i.e., on 3 March 1996, and from that time Israel's Electricity Sector Law - 1996 has applied, replacing the Electricity Concessions Order of 1927 of the Mandatory authorities. (See Electricity Authority (Israel).)

== Today ==
The IEC is one of the largest industrial companies in Israel, owning and operating an extensive nationwide power distribution network fed by 50 power station sites with an aggregate installed generating capacity of 22.2 GW. Since the end of 2010 the company generates most of its base load electricity using natural gas and diesel plants. In 2022, the company sold 76.9 TWh of electricity. As decided by the government of Israel, around half of Israeli electricity is generated privately, and then distributed by the IEC.

The Orot Rabin power station owned by the IEC has Israel's second-tallest structure, a chimney, standing at 300 m, while Tel Aviv's distinctive Reading Power Station was one of its earliest.

Israeli former Olympic sailor Shimshon Brokman worked for Israel Electric Corporation from 1988. In 2006, he was appointed Head of the Fuel Management Department.

The company's current CEO is Meir Speigler.

== Generation capacity ==
Plant	Fuel	Capacity [MW]
Steam powered power plants	coal, fuel oil, natural gas	6,180
Aeroderivative jet turbines	natural gas, diesel	504
Industrial gas turbines	natural gas	914
Combined cycle	natural gas	3,357
Total		10,955

== Palestinian territories ==
IEC provides power to the Palestinian territories. It is one of three sources of power for the Gaza Strip and the West Bank. Palestine Electric Company, founded in 1999 as a subsidiary of Palestine Power Company LLC, operates the Gaza Power Plant, the only power plant in the Gaza Strip, with a generation capacity of approximately 140 MW. PEC was granted by the Palestinian Authority an exclusive right to generate electricity in the Gaza Strip and sell it to PA owned or managed institutions for 20 years, which may be extended for a maximum of two consecutive five-year terms. The company currently does not have any fuel for its generator. Gaza also receives some power from Egypt, though supply is unreliable. Palestine Power Generation Company Plc, founded in 2010, operates a natural gas power generating plant in the West Bank.

On 23 February 2015, IEC cut off the West Bank power for about 45 minutes due to unpaid bills. Two days later it again cut off power, stating it was a warning to the PA to begin paying down the debt, which at that time was NIS 1.9 billion. The majority of the debt is owed by the PA and Jerusalem District Electricity Company (JDECO) which is a Palestinian electricity firm which buys its power from IEC and serves east Jerusalem, Bethlehem, Ramallah and Jericho areas. IEC stated that it is losing NIS 85 million per month on power supplied to Nablus and Jenin that is not being paid for, causing the majority of IEC's quarterly loss. The Palestinians accused IEC of collective punishment, however, IEC stated that it must operate independently and are treating this as it would any customer who does not pay their bills.

On 31 March 2016, IEC again cut power to parts of the West Bank, in the Jericho area, because of the NIS 1.7 billion debt. On 4 April, IEC cut power in the Bethlehem area, and the following day it cut power in the Hebron area. On 6 April, IEC restored full power to the West Bank after it received a payment of NIS 20 million, and an agreement to receive a full debt repayment schedule within seven days.

From June 2017, the PA informed the IEC that it will no longer to pay the bills for Gaza's electricity. It is said that PA's decision to stop the payments is an effort to undermine rival Palestinian group Hamas, which governs the Gaza Strip on a de facto basis.

== Community programs ==
Community programs include ongoing and one-off collaborations with local authorities in community-wide programs, with the Ministry of Education: "Green Electricity" - with "Pais" Clusters, "Technological Leadership - Green Smart Home" - in collaboration with "Taasiada", "Green Leadership" - online ORT, the techno in Olga Hill; Cooperation with IDF units for behavioral change in the field of electricity use through the headquarters of the Chief Education Officer of the Tov program (technician and matriculation) in cooperation with the Manufacturers Association, which provides its participants with a technician certificate in addition to the matriculation certificate; And the "Spreading Wing - Adoption of Eagles and Predators in Israel" project in collaboration with the Society for the Protection of Nature to confirm the population of birds of prey.

In addition, the company is expanding its activities in the "Path of Light" program, which promotes the issue of safety and intelligent use of electricity through educational-experiential activities Path of Light – a community educational program. In 2011, about 1,100 schools in 114 authorities throughout Israel took part in the program. About 350 of the company's employees and retirees take part in the program on a voluntary basis, and this year the parents of the students in about 25 localities also joined it.

In 2020, INT College collaborated with the IEC on advanced technological learning topics. Training was conducted in a variety of fields such as DevOps, Big Data, AWS and more.

The IEC has visitor centers at the power stations: in Haifa, Orot Rabin in Hadera, Rotenberg in Ashkelon and at the historic Heftziba farm in Hadera.

== See also ==
- Economy of Israel
- Energy in Israel
- Electricity Authority (Israel)
- Science and technology in Israel
