= Jerusalem District Electricity Company =

- Native name: Arabic: شركة كهرباء محافظة القدس Hebrew: חברת החשמל המזרח-ירושלמית
- Website: www.jdeco.net

The Jerusalem District Electricity Company (JDECO) is an electricity company in East Jerusalem.

== History ==
In 1957, the assets of the Jerusalem Electric & Public Service Corporation (JEPSC) were transformed into the Jordanian Jerusalem District Electricity Company (JJDEC), a regional-municipal utility with a strong local Jordanian-Palestinian identity. After the Six-Day War, the JJDEC was compelled to transform into an Israeli entity and was renamed Jerusalem District Electricity Company.

== Operations ==
JDECO supplies electricity to East Jerusalem and neighbouring areas, such as Bethlehem, Ramallah, and Jericho, operating with a distribution license from the Israeli Electricity Authority. In contrast, the Israeli Electric Corporation (IEC) manages electricity distribution in West Jerusalem and throughout Israel. The division has led to disparities in access to electricity and infrastructure quality, with East Jerusalem generally facing power shortages and blackouts due to aging infrastructure, unpaid debts from the JDECO to the IEC, and unauthorized electricity connections.

JDECO has approximately 1,000 employees.
