= How to Be Alone =

How to Be Alone may refer to:

in literature:

- How to Be Alone (book), a 2002 book by Jonathan Franzen
- How to Be Alone, a 2014 book by Sara Maitland
- How to Be Alone: If You Want To, and Even If You Don't, a 2018 book by Lane Moore
- "How to be alone", a 2016 poem by Donika Kelly

in other media:

- How to Be Alone (2009 film), a Canadian animated short film by Andrea Dorfman
- How to Be Alone (2016 film), an Israeli short film by Erez Eisenstein
- "How to Be Alone", a song by Eulogies from Here Anonymous
- how-to-be-alone.com, a photo/video project by Donari Braxton
