= Ashdot Ya'akov Ihud =

Ashdot Ya'akov Ihud: אַשְׁדוֹת יַעֲקֹב אִחוּד (Hebrew)
- Kibbutz
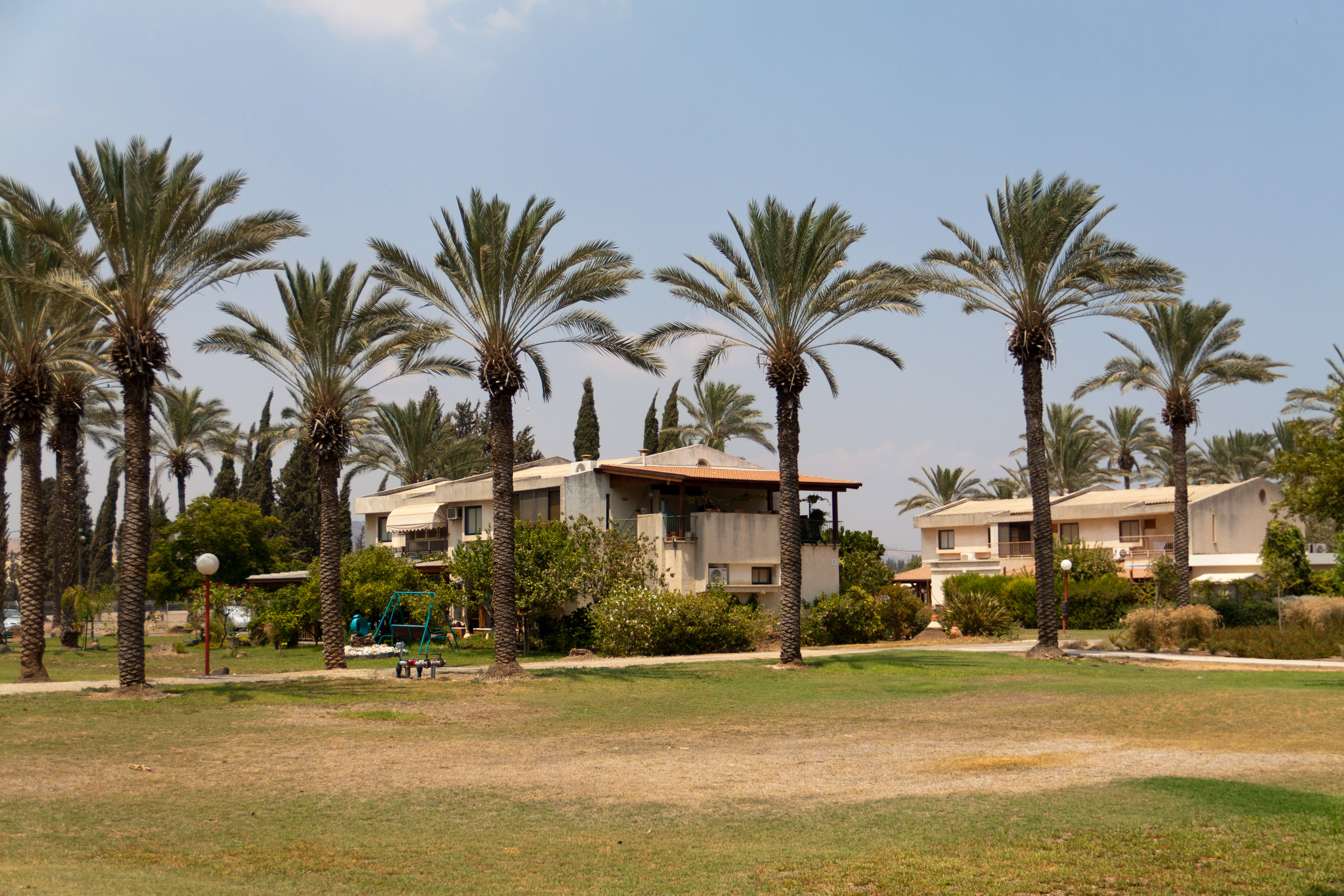

- Location within Northeast Israel Location within Israel
- Coordinates: 32°39′34″N 35°34′54″E
- Country: Israel
- District: Northern
- Subdistrict: Kinneret
- Council: Emek HaYarden
- Affiliation: Kibbutz Movement
- Founded: 1953
- Founder: Ihud HaKvutzot VeHaKibbutzim members
- Population (2024): 960

Ashdot Ya'akov Ihud (Hebrew: אַשְׁדוֹת יַעֲקֹב אִחוּד) is a kibbutz in northern Israel. Located to the south of the Sea of Galilee near the Jordanian border and covering 4,200 dunams, it falls under the jurisdiction of Emek HaYarden Regional Council. In 2024 it had a population of 960.

== History ==
The kibbutz was established in 1953 by members of Ihud HaKvutzot VeHaKibbutzim as a result of a split in the original kibbutz of Ashdot Ya'akov (members of HaKibbutz HaMeuhad established Ashdot Ya'akov Meuhad).
