= Yehud-Monosson =

Yehud-Monosson יְהוּד-מוֹנוֹסוֹן
- City

Hebrew transcription(s)
  - ISO 259: Yhud Monoson
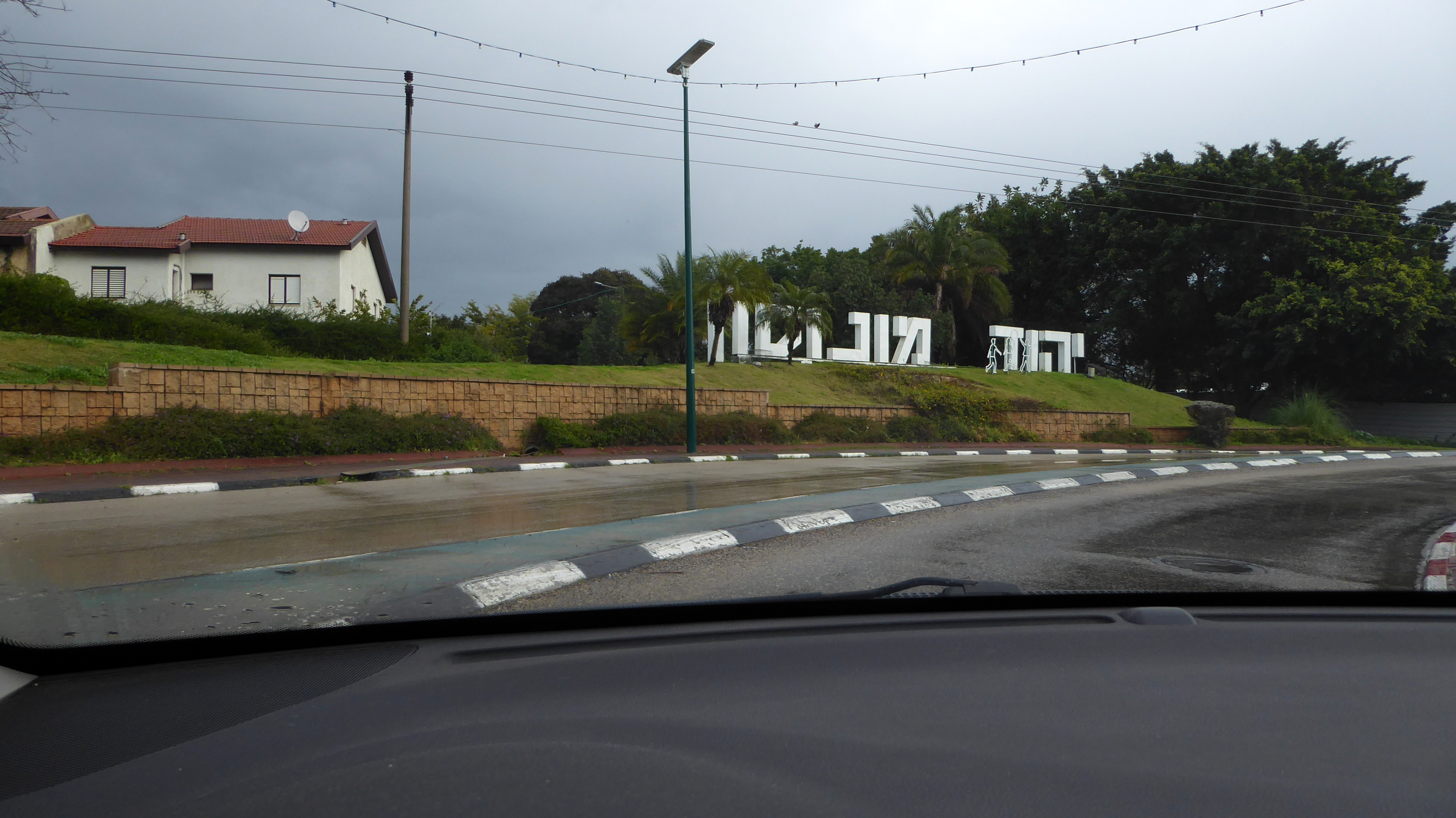

- Location within Central Israel Location within Israel
- Coordinates: 32°1′42.17″N 34°52′46.62″E
- Country: Israel
- District: Central
- Subdistrict: Petah Tikva
- Natural Region: Petah Tikva
- Founded: 2003 (by merger)

Government
  - Mayor: Amnon Sa'ad

Area
  - Total: 4,750 dunams (4.75 km^{2}; 1.83 sq mi)

Population (2026)
  - Total: 31,425
  - Density: 6,620/km^{2} (17,100/sq mi)

Ethnicity
  - Jews and others: 99.8%
  - Arabs: 0.2%
- Website: www.yehud-monosson.muni.il

Yehud-Monosson (Hebrew: יְהוּד-מוֹנוֹסוֹן) is a city formed by the joint municipality of the town of Yehud and the neighboring communal settlement of Neve Monosson in central Israel. In 2026 the city had a population of 31,425.

== History ==
Within a local authority merger program initiated by the Israeli Ministry of the Interior in 2003, the Municipality of Yehud was merged with the Local Council of Neve Monosson. The logo is inscribed with Biblical words from Genesis 49:8: "Judah, your brothers will praise you; your hand will be on the neck of your enemies."

Under the terms of the merger, Neve Monosson was left with a high level of communal autonomy under the elected Neve Monosson Local Administration (minhelet mekomit) which was granted municipal status as an autonomous borough (va'ad rova ironi) by the Interior Minister in 2005 within the implementation of the merger plan.

== Demographics ==
Year	Population
1972	9,000
1983	13,000
1995	18,800
2008	26,200
2022	30,977
2024	32,145
2026	31,425

== Voting Patterns ==
In the 2022 election, 50 percent of voters in Yehud-Monosson voted for the parties of the center-left coalition led by Yair Lapid, while 47 percent voted for the parties of the right-wing coalition led by Benjamin Netanyahu and 0.1 percent voted for the Arab parties.

In the 2026 election, 52 percent of voters in Yehud-Monosson voted for the parties of the center-left coalition led by Gadi Eisenkot, while 41 percent voted for the parties of the right-wing coalition led by Benjamin Netanyahu and 0.2 percent voted for the Arab parties. An additional 4.4 percent voted for the Reservists, and 1.7 percent voted for Amcha Yisrael. Voter turnout increased 9 percent from the 2022 election.

== Notable people ==
- Yonit Naaman, essayist, editor, and literary researcher
- Golan Pollack (born 1991), Olympic judoka
- Shlomi Shabat, vocalist
