= Yonit Naaman =

Israeli poet and editor

- יונית נעמן
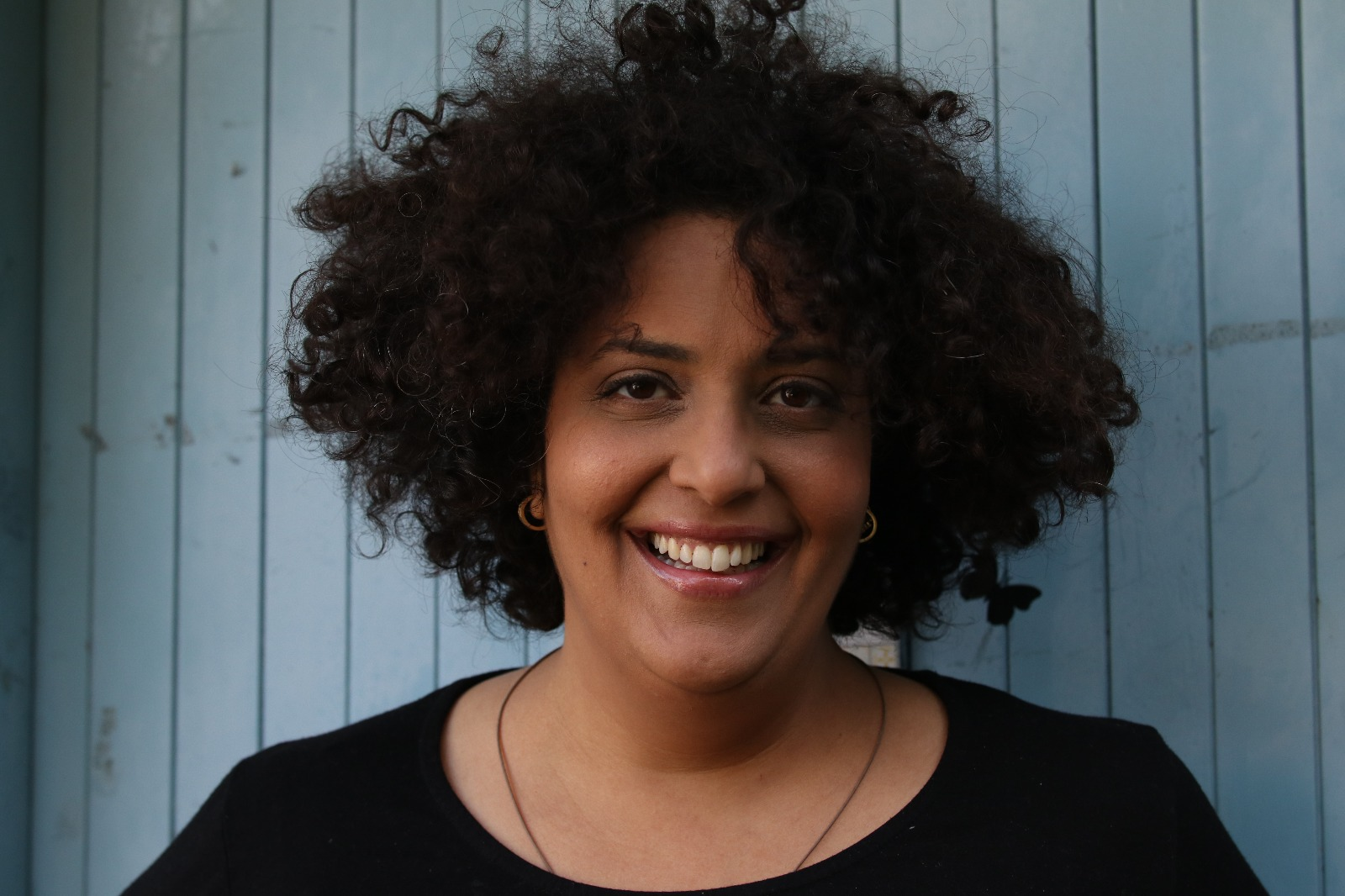
- Born: March 13, 1975 (age 51); Yehud
- Occupations: Poet, Literary Editor

Yonit Naaman (Hebrew: יונית נעמן; born March 13, 1975) is an Israeli poet, essayist, editor, and literary and cultural researcher.

== Early life and education ==
Naaman was born in Yehud to parents Dahlia and Ohaliav Naaman. She completed her bachelor's degree in literature at Tel Aviv University, and her Master of Arts degree in religious studies at University of Cambridge. Currently (as of 2020) Naaman is a doctoral candidate researching Hebrew Literature at Ben Gurion University of the Negev.

== Career ==
Naaman is co-editor of the criticism and commentary website "Haoketz", and literary editor for the "Maktoob" series published by Hargol Publishing and underwritten by the Van Leer Institute. She lectures poetry at Sapir Academic College, leads dialog workshops for Arabs and Jews, and is a board member of the non-profit organization "Zazim – Community Action", which promotes citizen activism.

Her poems, essays, criticism and articles have appeared in many of Israel's leading journals and publications, including Helicon, Iton 77, Theory and Criticism, and Granta.

Naaman's first book of poems, Pining for the Tree Tops, was published in 2015. In an interview, Naaman revealed that the book was almost named "Excess Baggage", and that it expresses, among other themes "one of the tensions present in my life, and certainly in my writing: the fear of being too much. Having too much pigment, carrying too much weight, being too much woman, too much outside accepted norms. It's a surplus that just breaks out without me even trying. I am in essence already in excess of what I was allotted."

The collection was positively received by critics. Effi Ziv, in Haaretz, wrote that "Yonit Na'aman's rich and deep language expresses allegiance to both Hebrew's roots and its treetops. And what it expresses constructs an assertive and political identity as well as anti-racist protest poetry". Revital Madar notes that in her work, Naaman demands representation for each of her various identities as a Yemenite, woman – of color, feminist... And that "Naaman marks the mutual difficulty in adaptation between her and the time in which she lives. At the same time, it seeks to define those who bloom late; Better late than never."

Her second collection of poems, If a Heart Falls (Im Lev Nofel; "אם לב נופל"), came out in 2018. This collection explores the personal, which is yet political, such as Naaman's struggles with fertility treatments. An entire chapter is dedicated to the topic "Man's Wife", including her secret occasional longing for the normative nuclear family she might have chosen had she not "fallen into feminist captivity", as she puts it. Naaman said of this, "There are longings that today I no longer have the ability to indulge. Because I am, how can I put this gently, a leftist, the world in all its glory seems spoiled for me. I can no longer celebrate Independence Day, I cannot watch children playing school sports dressed in blue and white. I also do not fantasize about dancing on the Temple Mount or participating in the Jerusalem Day marches. But the matter of a normative family life is something with a grip on the consciousness that is terribly powerful. And I have an ongoing, silly flirtation with this idea of what might have been."

This book was less well-received than her first. Critic Ran Yagil asks, "Where did the poet Yoni Naaman's freshness and audacity go?", opining that "Her second book succumbs to political correctness to the extent that the new position it purports to portray turns out to be worn out and unoriginal." Social activist Aviv Snir, however, lauded the straightforward way in which Naaman tackles a wide range of issues, from carb addiction to the profusion of prostitution calling cards on the sidewalks of Tel Aviv.

In 2018, an episode of the documentary mini-series A Tale of Five Poets ("Spleen and Failure") was dedicated to Naaman and her work.

In December 2019, Naaman was announced as one of the recipients of the Prime Minister's Prize for Hebrew Literary Works for 2020.

In June 2022 she won Haim Guri's prize for Hebrew poet.

Naaman resides in Tel Aviv, and is a mother with two children.

== Poetry collections ==
- Pining for the Treetops / Keshe'yaradnu Mehaʻetsim / כשירדנו מהעצים, Hakibbutz Hameuchad Publishing, 2015. (Ed: Tamar Israeli)
- If a Heart Falls / Im Lev Nofel / אם לב נופל, Locus Publishing, 2018. (Ed: Tamar Israeli)

== Editing ==
- Rainbow of Opinions: A Mizrahi Agenda for Israel, קשת של דעות : סדר יום מזרחי לחברה בישראל (Jerusalem: November Books, 2007), with Yossi Yonah and David Machlev
- Towards a new pay pyramid, Shlomo Svirsky, לקראת פירמידת שכר חדשה (Tel Aviv: Haoketz, 2011), with Tammy Riklis
- Granta: The Magazine of New Writing (Hebrew edition), Issue 7: Money, guest editor, together with Orna Coussin.
- Direction East, Issue 30
