= Al-Dalhamiyya =

Al-Dalhamiyya الدلهمية
- Village
- Etymology: from a family name
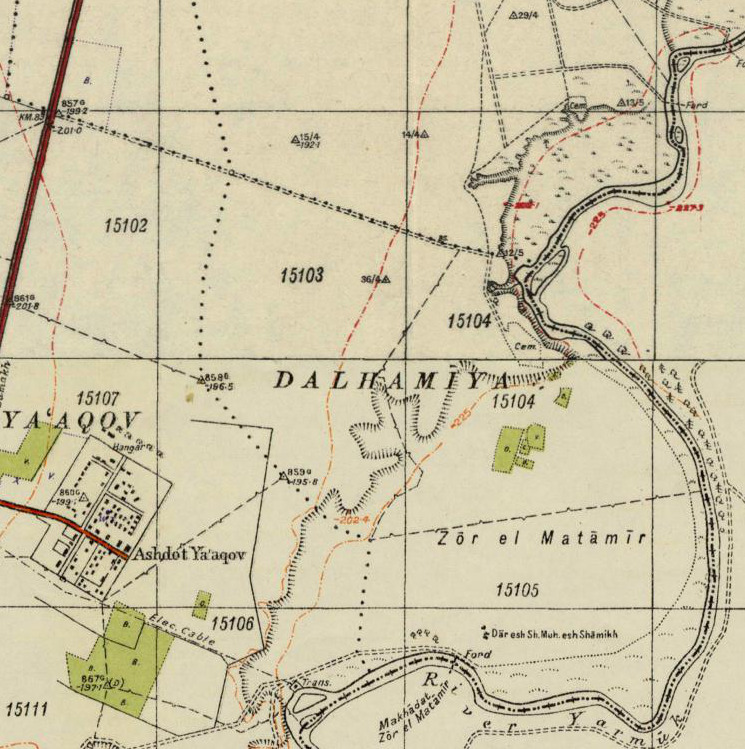
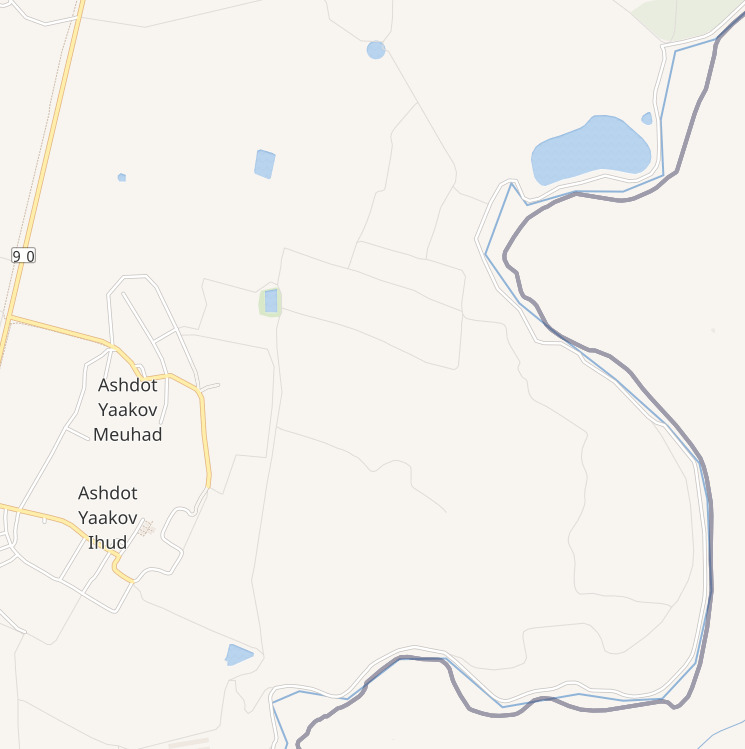
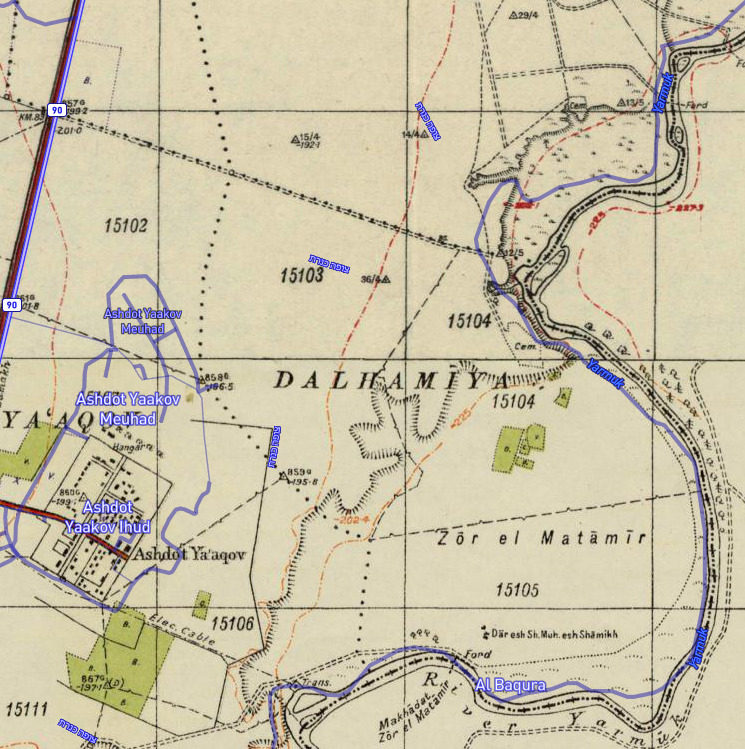
- 1940s map modern map 1940s with modern overlay map A series of historical maps of the area around Al-Dalhamiyya (click the buttons)

- Location within Mandatory Palestine
- Coordinates: 32°39′38″N 35°35′52″E
- Palestine grid: 204/230
- Geopolitical entity: Mandatory Palestine
- Subdistrict: Tiberias
- Date of depopulation: April 15, 1948

Area
  - Total: 2,852 dunams (2.852 km^{2}; 1.101 sq mi)

Population (1945)
  - Total: 410

Al-Dalhamiyya (Arabic: الدلهمية) was a Palestinian Arab village in the Tiberias Subdistrict. It was depopulated during the 1947–1948 Civil War in Mandatory Palestine on April 15, 1948, under Operation Gideon. It was located 14 km south of Tiberias, on the north bank of the Yarmuk River, on the border between Mandatory Palestine and Transjordan.

== History ==
=== Ottoman era ===
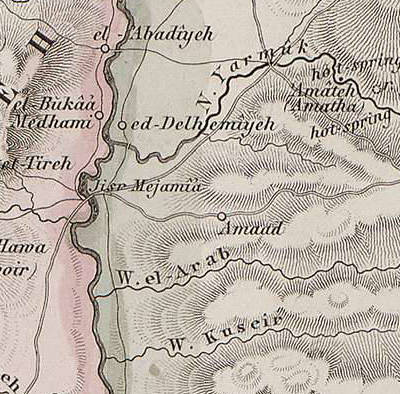
1858 map of the area – the location marked as Al-Dalhamiyya is the current location of Ashdot Ya'akov.

In 1838 Al-Dalhamiyya was pointed out to Edward Robinson during his travels in the area, as being located on the eastern bank, about half a mile above the mouth of the Yarmuk.

In 1875 Victor Guérin noted that the houses of the village were built of adobe, and most were surmounted by reed huts. The same year C. R. Conder called it a "miserable" adobe hamlet. A population list from about 1887 showed ed Delhamiyeh wa ’Arab el Hanady to have about 650 inhabitants; all Muslims.

Menachemya was founded by Zionist in 1902, close to the village, but not on village land.

=== British Mandate era ===
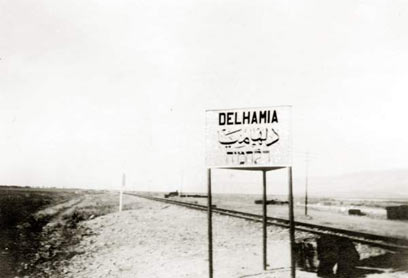
Al-Dalhamiyya train stop in the 1930s

At the time of the 1922 census of Palestine conducted by the British Mandate authorities, Delhamiyeh had a population of 352; 349 Muslims and 3 Jews, decreasing to 240; 226 Muslims, 1 Jew and 13 Christians, living in 50 houses by the 1931 census.

Ashdot Ya'aqov, southwest to the village site, and Ashdot Ya'aqov Me'uchad, west of the village site, were settled by Zionist in 1933, but none on village land.

In the 1944/1945 statistics, the village had a population of 410; 390 Muslims and 20 Christians, with a total of 2,852 dunams of land. Of this, Arabs used 29 dunams for plantations and irrigable land, 1,709 dunams were used for cereals, while a total of 442 dunams were un-cultivable.

=== 1948, aftermath ===
Historians say the details of the depopulation of the village remain unclear, but they expect it was captured in mid- to late April 1948, when neighboring Samakh was taken. By May 3, 1948, it was reported to the Jewish National Fund that the area surrounding Lake Tiberias had been emptied of Arab inhabitants.

In 1992, the village site was described thus by historian Walid Khalidi: "The village has been obliterated. There is a banana grove on the site that belongs to the nearby kibbutz, Ashdod Ya'aqov."

== Bibliography ==
- Barron, J. B., ed. (1923). Palestine: Report and General Abstracts of the Census of 1922. Government of Palestine.
- Conder, C.R. (1875). "Lieut. Claude R. Conder's reports". Quarterly Statement - Palestine Exploration Fund. 7 (2): 63–89. doi:10.1179/peq.1875.009.
- Conder, C.R.; Kitchener, H. H. (1882). The Survey of Western Palestine: Memoirs of the Topography, Orography, Hydrography, and Archaeology. Vol. 2. London: Committee of the Palestine Exploration Fund.
- Department of Statistics (1945). Village Statistics, April, 1945. Government of Palestine.
- Guérin, V. (1880). Description Géographique Historique et Archéologique de la Palestine (in French). Vol. 3: Galilee, pt. 1. Paris: L'Imprimerie Nationale.
- Hadawi, S. (1970). Village Statistics of 1945: A Classification of Land and Area ownership in Palestine. Palestine Liberation Organization Research Centre. Archived from the original on 2018-12-08.
- Khalidi, W. (1992). All That Remains:The Palestinian Villages Occupied and Depopulated by Israel in 1948. Washington D.C.: Institute for Palestine Studies. ISBN 0-88728-224-5.
- Morris, B. (2004). The Birth of the Palestinian Refugee Problem Revisited. Cambridge University Press. ISBN 978-0-521-00967-6.
- Palmer, E. H. (1881). The Survey of Western Palestine: Arabic and English Name Lists Collected During the Survey by Lieutenants Conder and Kitchener, R. E. Transliterated and Explained by E.H. Palmer. Committee of the Palestine Exploration Fund.
- Robinson, E.; Smith, E. (1841). Biblical Researches in Palestine, Mount Sinai and Arabia Petraea: A Journal of Travels in the year 1838. Vol. 3. Boston: Crocker & Brewster.
- Schumacher, G. (1888). "Population list of the Liwa of Akka". Quarterly Statement - Palestine Exploration Fund. 20: 169–191.
