= Orna Coussin =

Israeli writer and translator

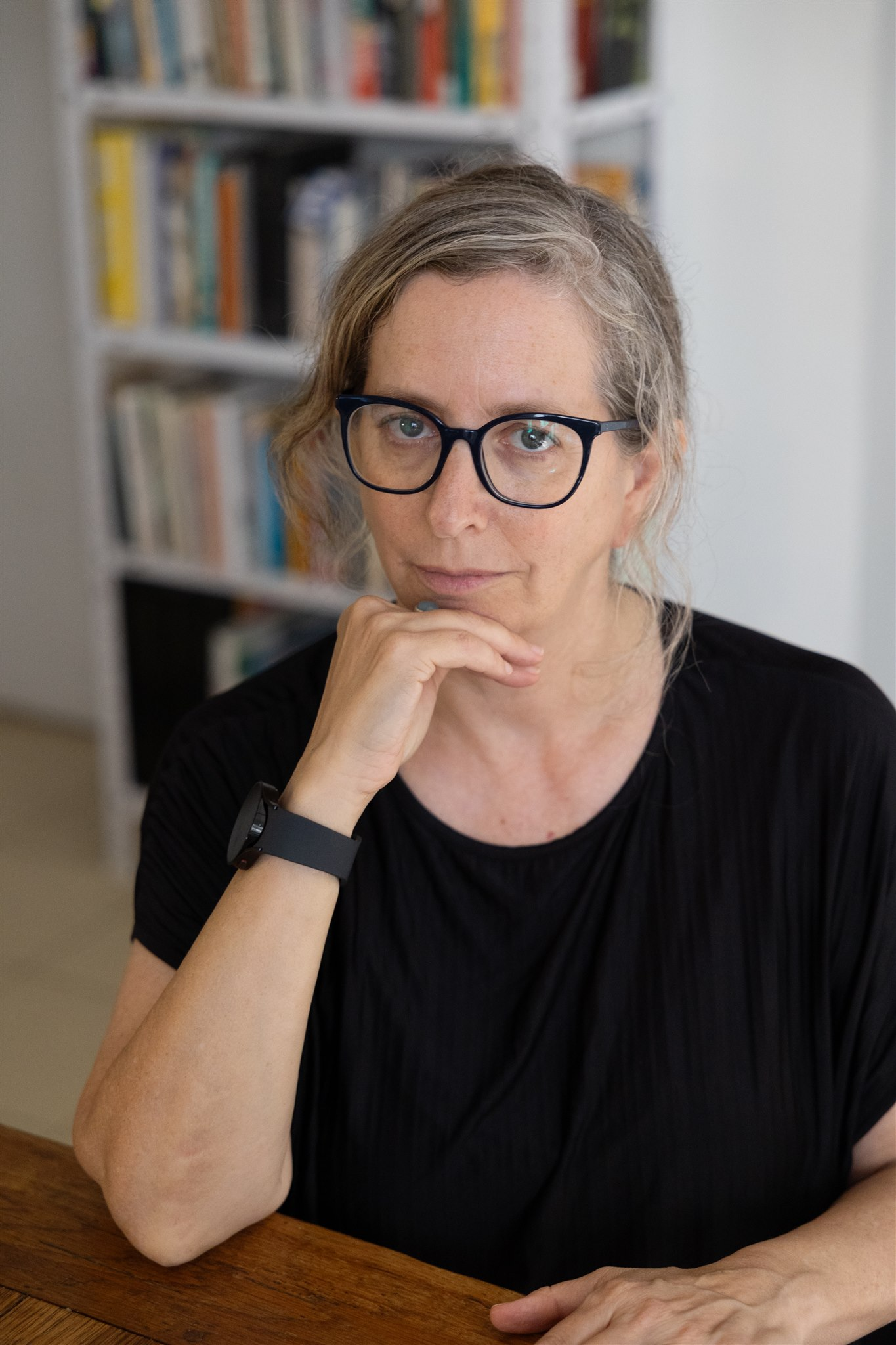
- Native name: ארנה קזין
- Born: October 22, 1967 (age 58)
- Occupation: Writer; Essayist; Memoirist; Cultural critic
- Period: 2004 to present
- Notable awards: Prime Minister Award for Hebrew Writers (2009)

Website
- ornacoussin.co.il

Orna Coussin (Hebrew; ארנה קזין; born October 22, 1967) is an Israeli author, literary critic, journalist, essayist, memoirist, translator, and instructor of literary non-fiction writing.

== Biography ==
Coussin was born in Scotland. She immigrated to Israel with her parents and grew up in Ramat Gan, where she attended Blich High School. During her military service, she served in the Intelligence Corps. She was also a handball player for Maccabi Ramat Hen and the Israeli national handball team.

Between 1991 and 1997, she wrote for the newspapers Hadashot, Kol Ha'ir, and Ha'ir. From 1997 through the end of 2006, she wrote essays and feature articles for the Gallery supplement of Haaretz, focusing on culture, globalization, society, feminism, and sexual identity. Beginning in 2007, she contributed essays to Haaretz and the weekly magazine LaIsha, and edited Ka'et, a series devoted to literary journalism published by Hakibbutz Hameuchad. Her essays have also appeared in the literary journals HaMeorer, Resling, Theory and Criticism, Granta, Moznaim, Ho!, and Hazman Hazeh.

In 2004, her book במרחק הליכה: חיבור על תרבות הצריכה (Within Walking Distance: An Essay on Consumer Culture) was published. The book examines the cultural and social meanings of consumer culture in Israel. Four years later, she published על הנוחות (On Comfort), which continues the discussion of consumer culture and its effects on our lives. The book explores the cultural, moral, and social costs people pay in pursuit of comfort.

In 2006, she published her collection of short stories, פיקניק (Picnic). Director Erez Eisenstein later adapted one of the stories from this collection into the film How to Be Alone. In 2011, she published אפס עד 12 (Zero to Twelve), which chronicles, in diary form, her first year of parenthood as the partner of the woman who gave birth to their daughter.

In 2015, she published גוזל (Nestling), the first in a series of detective novellas featuring lesbian ornithologist Dr. Eliana Davidov, who serves as an amateur detective. The second installment, פולשת (Intruder), appeared in 2017. The third and final installment, titled בושה (Shame), was published as a story in the literary journal HaMusach in May 2023.

Since 2007, Coussin has devoted herself to writing and teaching creative non-fiction writing. In 2015 she published the writing guide לטפס על ההר, או: איך לכתוב (Climbing That Mountain, or: How to Write). Her essay collection איך להיות ושאלות אחרות (How to Be and Other Questions) came out in 2021. Her essay How to Resist, written in response to the rise of Israel's far-right government in November 2022, was published in book format in January 2023. In How to Resist, Coussin presents examples of successful protest movements around the world and outlines principles of effective resistance, including persistence in protest and the protection of freedom of expression.

Her tenth book, איך להישאר (How to Stay), a collection of essays written since November 2022, was published in August 2024.

In 2026, she released her eleventh book, איך להיות סקוטית: שיעורים בשייכות (How to be Scottish: Lessons in Belonging), a diary-style essay collection in which she reimagines her identity by leaving behind the heavy anxieties of Israeli life to embrace her Scottish roots, exploring displaced identities and cultural role-play, while trying to determine what it means to belong.

Coussin mentors writers individually and in groups, specializing in essays, memoir, and criticism. Among other roles, she teaches workshops in criticism and essay writing in the M.A. program in Policy and Theory of the Arts at the Bezalel Academy of Arts and Design in Jerusalem, as well as in leadership programs run by the Mandel Foundation and the Van Leer Jerusalem Institute.

In 2009, she received the Israeli Prime Minister's Prize for Hebrew Literary Works.

In 2023, Coussin was among those selected to light a ceremonial torch at the Alternative Independence Day Ceremony, held in Jerusalem annually by Yesh Gvul.

On February 10, 2024, Coussin was arrested during a demonstration calling for the release of the hostages taken during the events of October 7.

=== Personal life ===
Coussin lives in Tel Aviv with her partner Michal and their two daughters.

== Works ==
- במרחק הליכה: חיבור על תרבות הצריכה, הוצאת בבל 2004 (Walking Distance: An Essay on Consumer Culture, Babel Publishing 2004)
- פיקניק, הוצאת הקיבוץ המאוחד, 2006 (Picnic, Hakibbutz Hameuchad 2006)
- על הנוחות, הוצאת בבל, 2008 (On Comfort, Babel Publishing, 2008)
- אפס עד 12 – יומן השנה הראשונה, הוצאת הקיבוץ המאוחד, 2011 (Zero to Twelve: A Diary of the First Year, Hakibbutz Hameuchad 2011)
- לטפס על ההר או איך לכתוב, אחוזת בית, 2015 (Climbing That Mountain, or: How to Write, Ahuzat Bayit, 2015)
- גוזל, הוצאת הקיבוץ המאוחד, 2015 (Nestling, Hakibbutz Hameuchad 2015)
- פולשת, הוצאת הקיבוץ המאוחד, 2017 (Intruder, Hakibbutz Hameuchad 2017)
- איך להיות ושאלות אחרות, אוליפנט, 2021 (How to Be and Other Questions, Oliphant 2021)
- איך להתנגד, אוליפנט, 2023 (How to Resist, Oliphant 2023)
- איך להישאר, אוליפנט, 2024 (How to Stay, Oliphant 2024)
- 2026, איך להיות סקוטית, אלטנוילנד (How to Be Scottish, Altneuland 2026)

Books Coussin translated from English to Hebrew

- The Mysteries of Pittsburgh by Michael Chabon, Am Oved 2010 as מסתרי פיטסבורג
- The Accidental by Ali Smith, Babel Publishing 2010 as המקרית
