= Ashdot Ya'akov =

Kibbutz in northern Israel

Ashdot Ya'akov: אַשְׁדוֹת יַעֲקֹב (Hebrew)
- Kibbutz

Hebrew transcription(s)
  - Standard: Ashdot Ya'akov
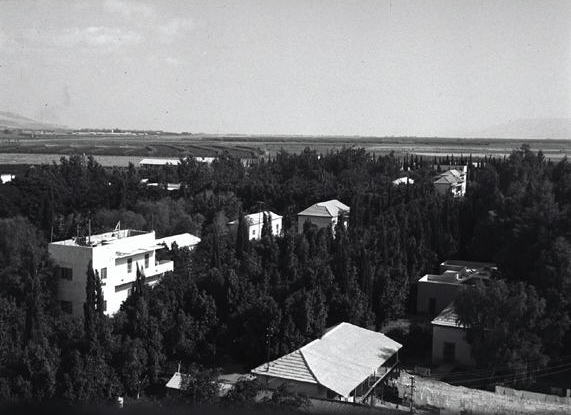
- Ashdot Ya'akov in 1945
- Etymology: Ya'akov Rapids
- Location within Jezreel Valley region of Israel
- Coordinates: 32°39′29″N 35°34′55″E
- Country: Israel
- District: Northern
- Founded: 1924
- Founder: Hashomer members from Latvia

Ashdot Ya'akov (Hebrew: אַשְׁדוֹת יַעֲקֹב, lit. 'Ya'akov Rapids') is a kibbutz in northern Israel. Originally founded in 1924 by a kvutza of Hashomer members from Latvia on the land which is today Gesher, it moved to its current location between 1933 and 1935. It was named after the rapids of the nearby Yarmuk River and James "Ya'akov" Armand de Rothschild.

== History ==
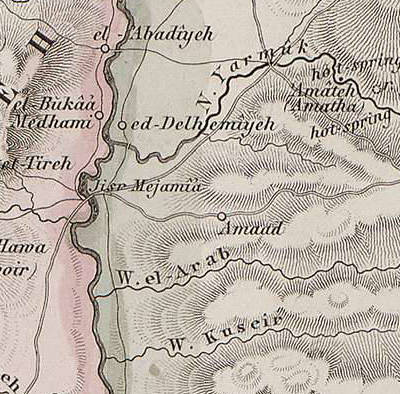
1858 map of the area – the location marked as Al-Dalhamiyya is the current location of Ashdot Ya'akov

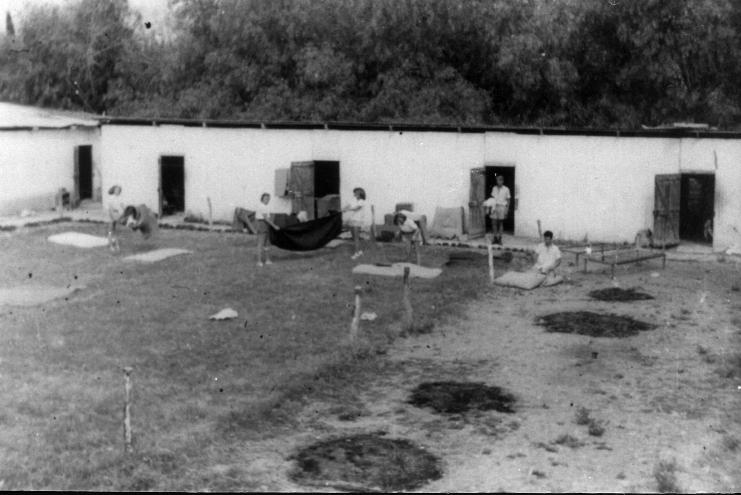
Ashdot Ya'akov in 1947

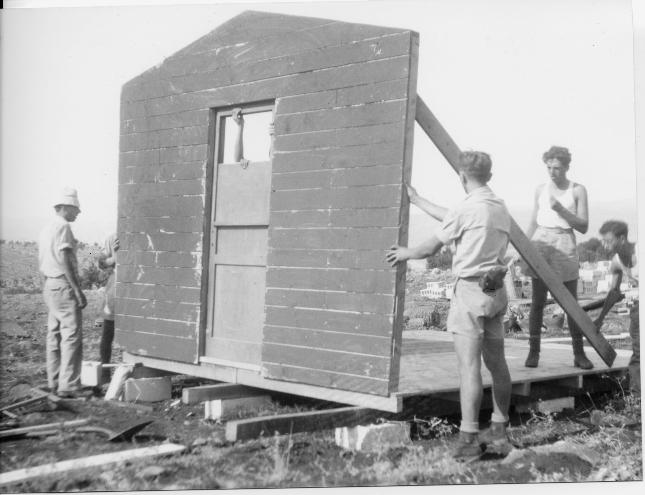
Members of the Yiftach Brigade receiving construction training at Ashdot Ya'akov in 1948

Between 1933 and 1935 the kibbutz moved northeast of its original location, onto land which had been bought by the Palestine Jewish Colonization Association.

The children of Ashdot Ya'akov were evacuated during the 1948 Arab-Israeli war, when the kibbutz suffered intensive shelling from Syrian, Iraqi and Transjordanian forces.

In 1953, as a result of the split in the HaKibbutz HaMeuhad movement, the kibbutz was split in two:

- Members of Ihud HaKvutzot VeHaKibbutzim established Ashdot Ya'akov Ihud
- Members of HaKibbutz HaMeuhad established Ashdot Ya'akov Meuhad

South of Ashdot Ya'akov, at the confluence of the Jordan and Yarmuk rivers near the island of Naharayim, there is a memorial for the 7 twelve-year-old Israeli girls murdered by a Jordanian border guard in March 1997.

== Archaeology ==
In 1959 a basalt tombstone inscribed in Greek was found near Ashdot Ya'akov. The tombstone features a rectangular structure with a gabled roof on a trapezoid base, and bears the name Hagarea (Άγαρέα), with its design aligning with classical, Hellenistic and Roman period norms. While the female name's exact origins remains uncertain, it is likely Jewish, potentially linked to the biblical name Hagar, Abraham's concubine.
