= Neve Monosson =

Part of Yehud-Monosson city, Israel

Neve Monosson נוה מונוסון

Hebrew transcription(s)
  - ISO 259: Nwe Monoson
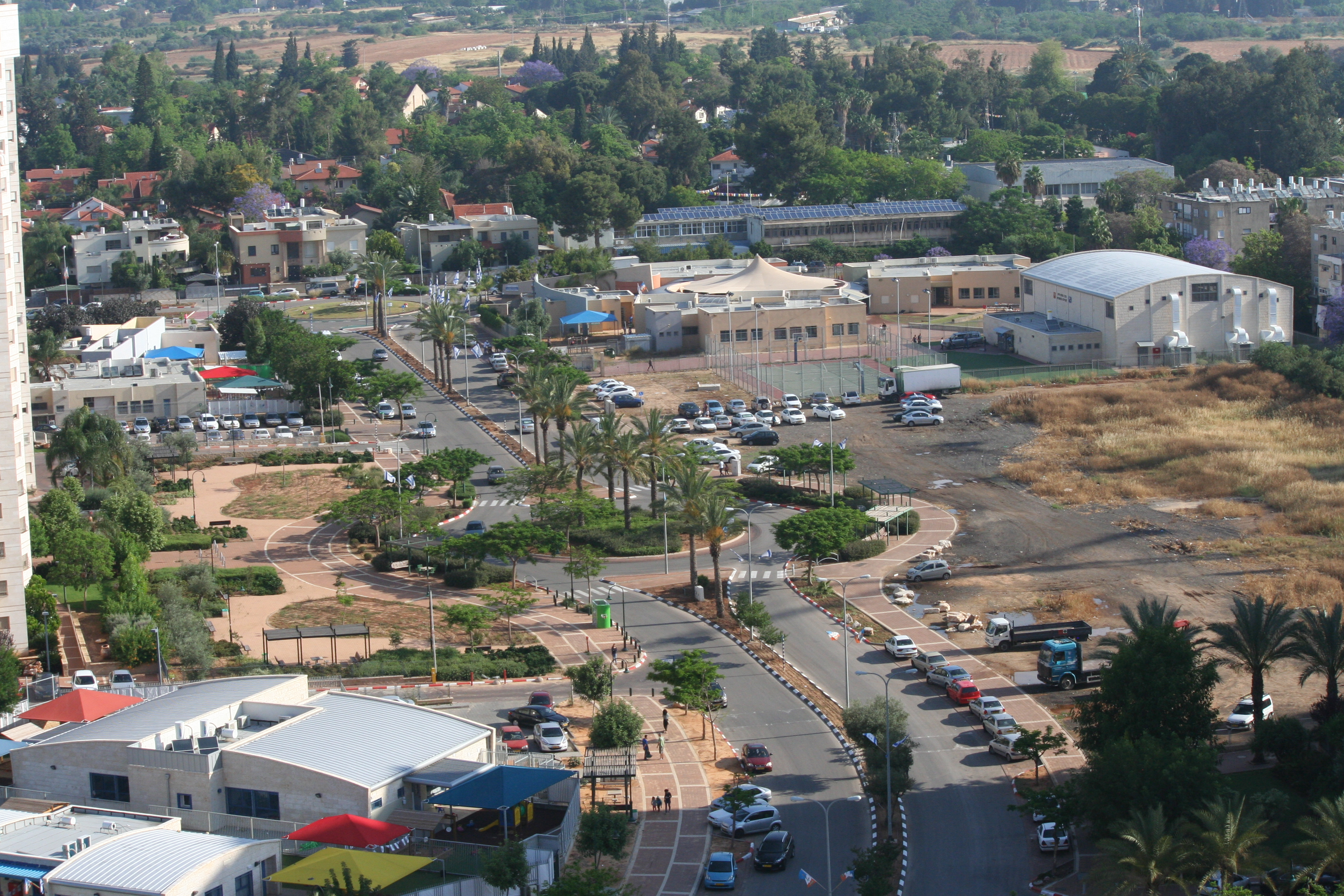

- Location within Central Israel Location within Israel
- Coordinates: 32°01′N 34°52′E
- Country: Israel
- District: Central
- Founded: 1953

Government
  - Head of Municipality: Noa Maor

Population (2003)
  - Total: 2,600
- Website: www.neve-monosson.muni.il

Neve Monosson (Hebrew: נוה מונוסון), also known as Neve Efraim and Neve Efraim Monosson, commonly called Monosson by its residents, is a municipal borough within the joint municipality of Yehud-Monosson (along with the city of Yehud) in central Israel. In 2003 it had a population of 2,600 but its population is growing considerably due to the ongoing implementation of the Tamar Project, within which 200 family apartments are being replaced by 800 family apartments within a residents-initiated Pinui-Binui (literally: Eviction-Construction) Project; this project is expected to almost double the population of Monosson.

== History ==
According to Marom, during the 18th and 19th centuries, the area belonged to the Nahiyeh (sub-district) of Lod that encompassed the area of the present-day city of Modi'in-Maccabim-Re'ut in the south to the present-day city of El'ad in the north, and from the foothills in the east, through the Lod Valley to the outskirts of Jaffa in the west. This area was home to thousands of inhabitants in about 20 villages, who had at their disposal tens of thousands of hectares of prime agricultural land.

Neve Monosson was founded in 1953 by a group of families supported by Fred (Efraim) Monosson, a wealthy raincoat manufacturer and a leading Zionist from Boston, Massachusetts. Over the years, it attracted families of airline pilots due to its proximity to the airport.

Neve Monosson is located on the land of the depopulated Palestinian village of Kafr 'Ana; "on or very near" the village site.

The community was a cooperative society within the local regional council from 1953 and became an independent local council in 1964. In 2003 it elected and established the Neve Monosson Local Administration, in order to preserve the community's unique social and cultural autonomy within a municipal merger with the neighboring town of Yehud that created the joint Yehud-Monosson municipality.

The local administration, which in 2005 received municipal status as an autonomous borough (Va'ad Rova Ironi) from the Interior Minister, is responsible for all aspects of community life in Neve Monosson and receives basic municipal services from the joint municipality.

The community, which has its own elementary school, country club, scouts troop, sports hall, culture hall, library and support system for the elderly, is characterized by its uncommon level of volunteering activity. Its communal activities are run by non-profit organizations owned by members of the community.

== Archaeology ==
In the late 1990s, Israeli archaeologists discovered Chalcolithic remains in the area of Neve Monosson.

A huge Intermediate Bronze Age cemetery located by archaeologists at Newe Efrayim yielded the 2025 discovery of mineralised (calcified) remains of 4,500 to 4,000 years old linen wicks, one complete, with some still placed inside oil lamps.
