= Ashdot Ya'akov Meuhad =

Ashdot Ya'akov Meuhad: אַשְׁדוֹת יַעֲקֹב מְאֻחָד (Hebrew)
- Kibbutz
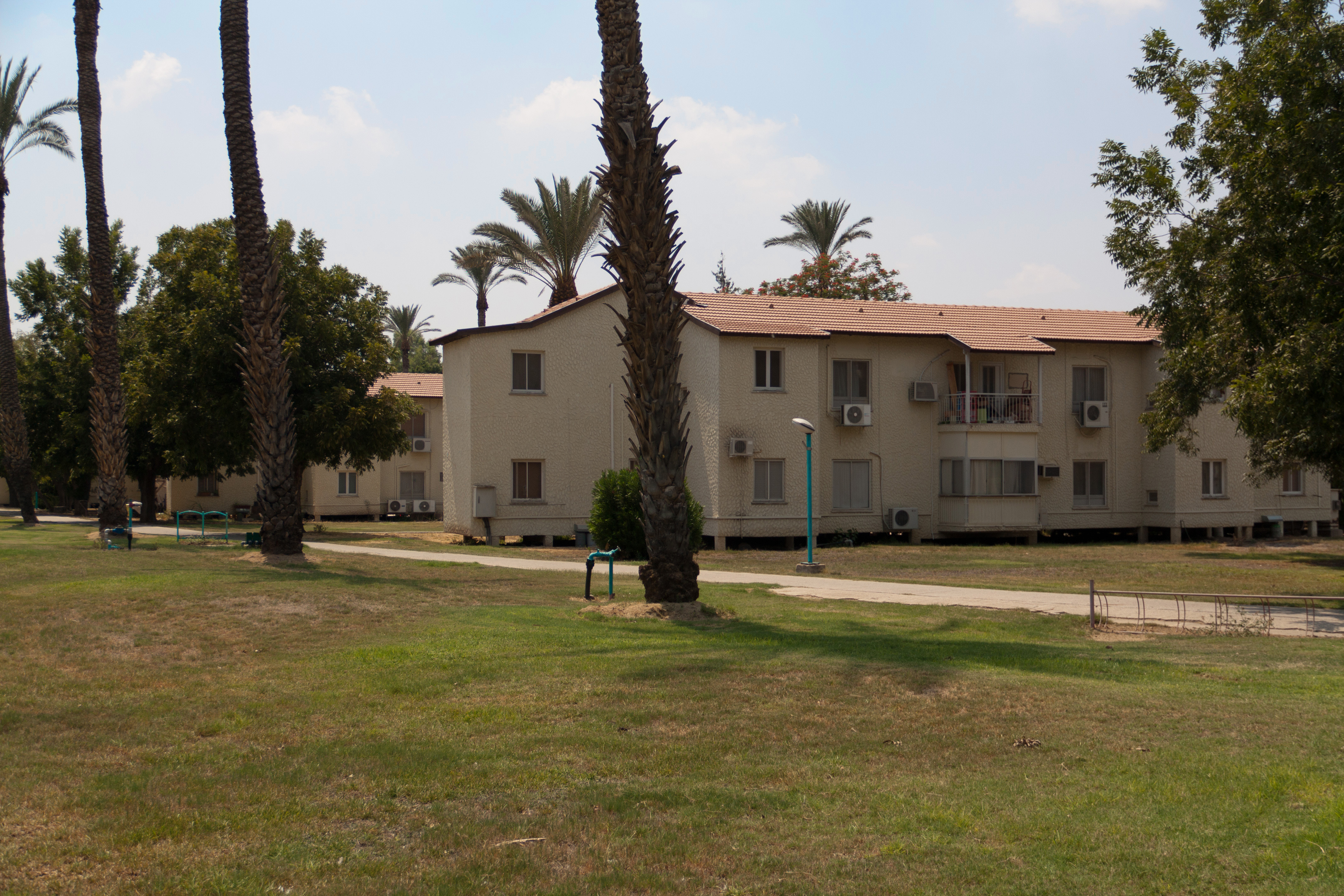

- Location within Northeast Israel Location within Israel
- Coordinates: 32°39′56″N 35°34′56″E
- Country: Israel
- District: Northern
- Subdistrict: Kinneret
- Council: Emek HaYarden
- Affiliation: Kibbutz Movement
- Founded: 1953
- Founder: HaKibbutz HaMeuhad members
- Population (2024): 919

Ashdot Ya'akov Meuhad (Hebrew: אַשְׁדוֹת יַעֲקֹב מְאֻחָד) is a kibbutz in northern Israel. Located to the south of the Sea of Galilee near the Jordanian border and covering 4,300 dunams, it falls under the jurisdiction of Emek HaYarden Regional Council. In 2024 it had a population of 919.

== History ==
Ashdot Ya'akov Meuhad was established in 1953 by members of HaKibbutz HaMeuhad who broke away from Ashdot Ya'akov for political reasons. Members of Ihud HaKvutzot VeHaKibbutzim established Ashdot Ya'akov Ihud.

One of the kibbutz pioneers, Joseph Zauderer, who immigrated here in 1939, wrote a report about the situation in Germany until 1939.

The Uri and Rami Nechushtan Museum, which opened in 1958, is named after two brothers from the kibbutz who died. Uri Nechushtan was killed in the War of Independence, and six years later, in 1954, his brother, Rami, died from a snake bite. Their father, Meir, founded the museum to commemorate his sons' artistic talents.

The kibbutz's Beit Eyal centre is dedicated to a kibbutz member who was killed in Lebanon.
