= Yehud, Israel =

Yehud יְהוּד
- City

Hebrew transcription(s)
  - ISO 259: Yhud
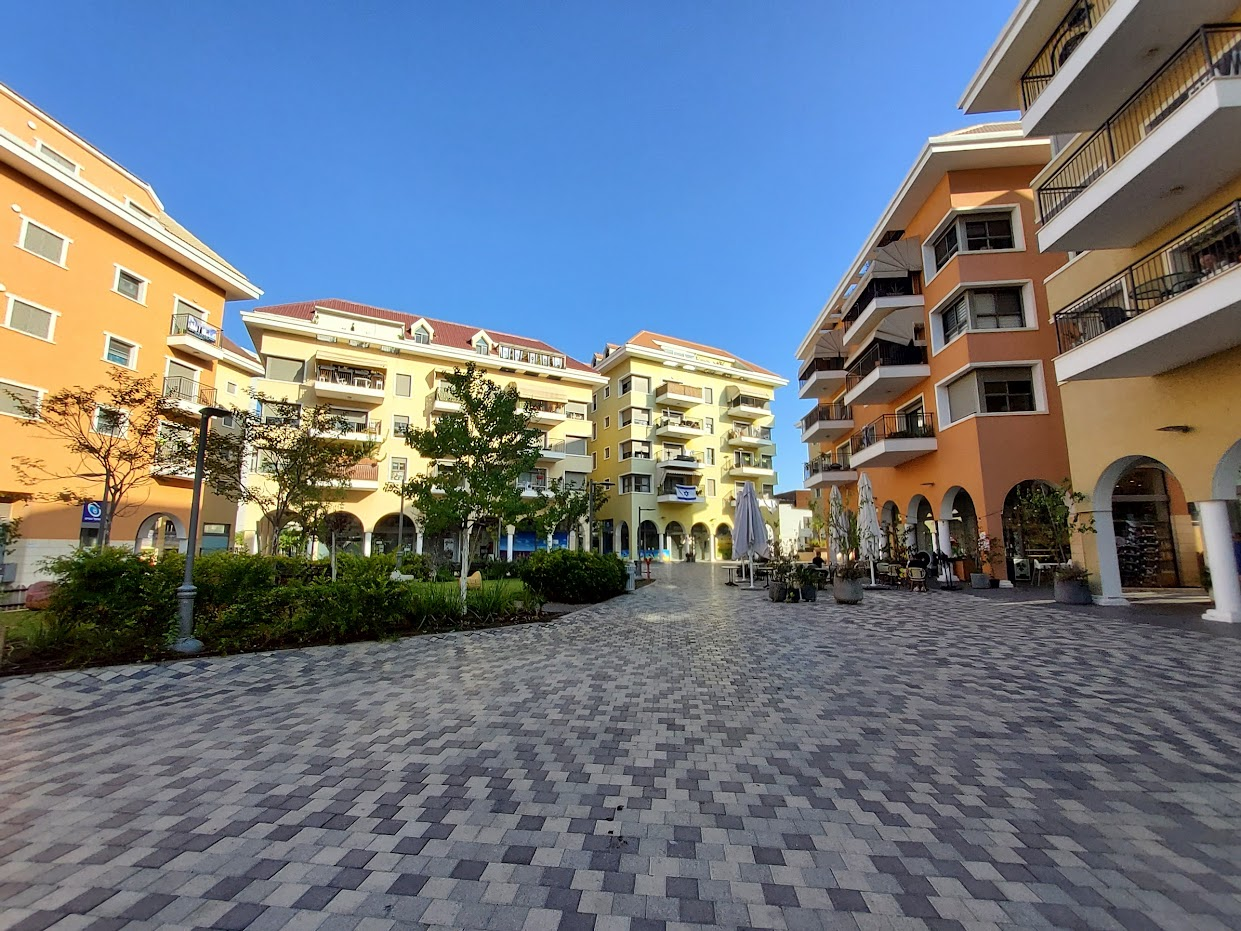

- Location within Israel's Central District Yehud (Israel)
- Coordinates: 32°2′0″N 34°53′0″E
- Country: Israel
- District: Central
- Founded: 2000 BCE (Earliest settlement); 1500 BCE (Israelite town); 1596 (Arab village of al-Yahudiya); 1953 (Israeli city)

Government
  - Mayor: Amnon Saad

Area
  - Total: 4.1 km^{2} (1.6 sq mi)

Population (2007)
  - Total: 25,604
  - Density: 6,200/km^{2} (16,000/sq mi)
- Name meaning: Named for Biblical location

Yehud (Hebrew: יְהוּד) is a city in the Central District of Israel that is part of the joint municipality of Yehud-Monosson. In 2007, the city's population stood at approximately 30,000 people (including Neve Monosson – see below).

== History ==
The history of Yehud traces back thousands of years. Yehud is first mentioned in the Bible in Joshua 19:45. Later it was called Iudaea by the Romans. During the Ottoman era it was known as Al-Yahudiya and censuses showed its population as entirely Arab and Muslim. In the 16th century, it was endowed to the Ottoman Khasseki Sultan soup kitchen in Jerusalem. During the 18th and 19th centuries, the area belonged to the Nahiyeh (sub-district) of Lod that encompassed the area of the present-day city of Modi'in-Maccabim-Re'ut in the south to the present-day city of El'ad in the north, and from the foothills in the east, through the Lod Valley to the outskirts of Jaffa in the west. This area was home to thousands of inhabitants in about 20 villages, who had at their disposal tens of thousands of hectares of prime agricultural land.

In 1932, during the British Mandate, Al-Yahudiya was renamed to Al-'Abbasiyya, because its Arab inhabitants did not want its name to be connected to the Jewish people. The new name memorialized a sheikh named al-ʽAbbas who was buried in the town, while also alluding to the Abbasid Caliphate. al-Yahudiya was depopulated during the 1948 Arab–Israeli War. Yehud was founded on the same site, with four thousand immigrants being settled there during 1948.

In June 2011, the city's officials announced they would undertake a massive construction project to replicate the old town square of the Swiss city of Lugano in the centre of Yehud, to reinvigorate commerce and tourism. The replica will be replete with neoclassical columns and colonnades. This project was scheduled to be finished and in fall 2016; it opened in early 2018.

During the 2026 Iran War, two workers were killed and a third seriously injured after being struck by submunitions from an Iranian missile equipped with a cluster bomb warhead. The two had been struck outdoors at a construction site and had not been in a protected shelter; the first victim was killed immediately, while the second victim succumbed the following day.

== Local government ==
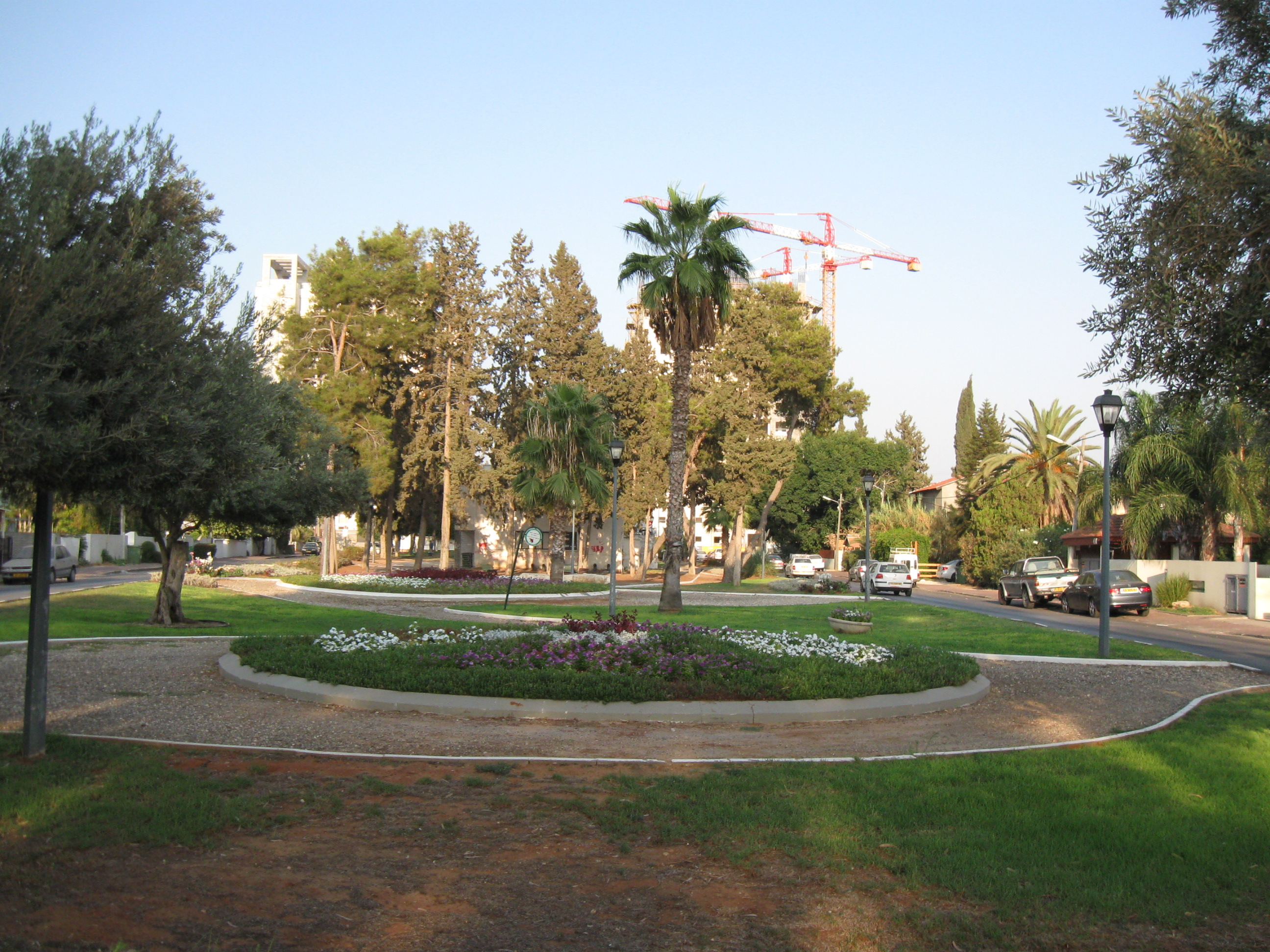
Yehud park

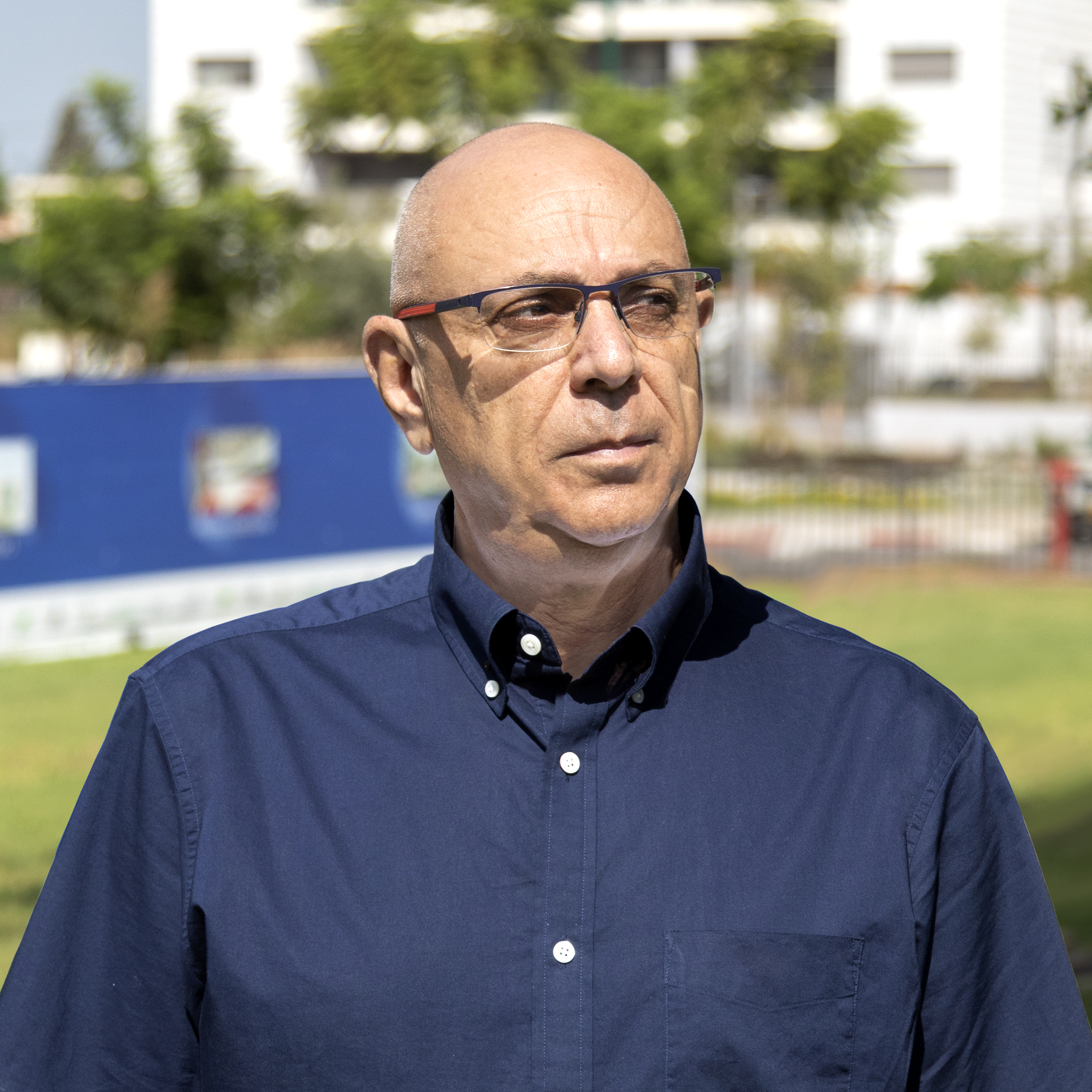
Amnon Saad, The Mayor from 2024

In 2003, the Yehud-Monosson municipality was formed to provide municipal services to Yehud and the neighboring community of Neve Monosson (pop. 2,600). Under the terms of the merger, Neve Monosson maintains a high level of autonomy under the Neve Monosson Local Administration (minhelet). The Neve Monosson Local Administration was granted municipal status as an autonomous borough (vaad rova ironi) by the Interior Minister in 2005 as a condition of the merger plan. The result is that the Yehud-Monosson Municipality functions practically as the municipality of Yehud while at the same time providing basic statutory municipal services to Neve Monosson.

== Demographics ==
According to the Israel Central Bureau of Statistics, in 2001 the ethnic makeup of the city was uniformly Jewish. See Population groups in Israel. According to CBS, in 2001 there were 10,500 males and 11,100 females. The population of the city was spread out, with 33.4% 19 years of age or younger, 16.1% between 20 and 29, 19.9% between 30 and 44, 18.8% from 45 to 59, 2.9% from 60 to 64, and 8.8% 65 years of age or older. The population growth rate in 2001 was 2.6%.

== Economy ==
Yehud serves as the base of the large Africa Israel Investments company majority owned by Lev Leviev.

The control room of SpaceIL is in Yehud. From that base, SpaceIL managed the operations of the Beresheet lander.

== Education ==
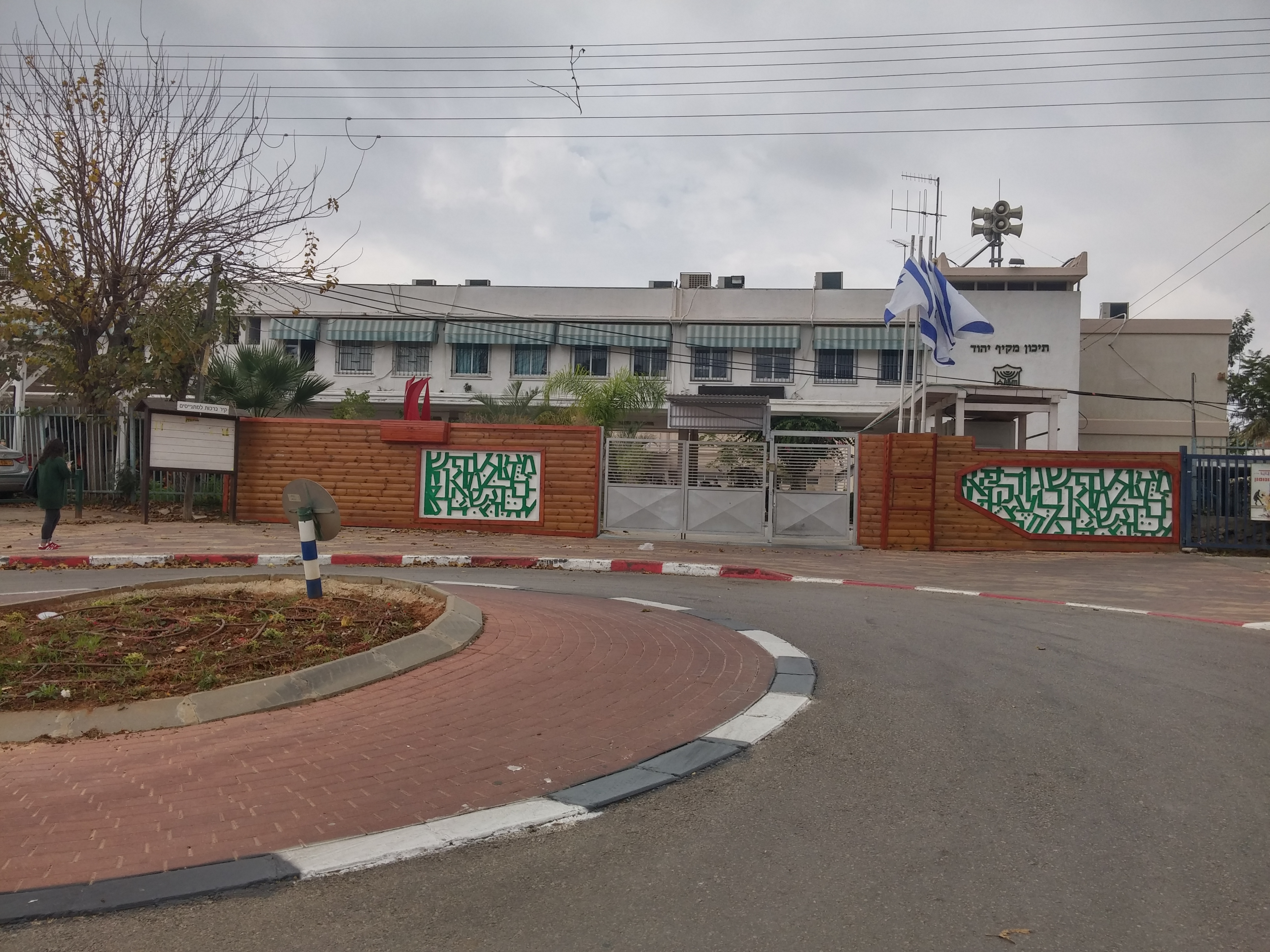
Yehud high school

According to CBS, there are 10 schools and 5,159 students in the city. They are spread out, as 6 elementary schools and 2,252 elementary school students, and 5 high schools and 2,907 high school students. 54.2% of 12th grade students were entitled to a matriculation certificate in 2001. and 92.5% in 2021

== Sports ==
Football: (Soccer) Hapoel Yehud spent several seasons in the top division of Israeli football during the late 1970s and early 1980s, and won the State Cup in 1982. However, after several relegations the club folded in 1998. A new club, Hapoel Ironi Yehud, was established in 2004 and currently plays in Liga Gimel. (Division III)

== Notable residents ==
- Inbar Lanir (born 2000), world champion and Olympic judoka
- Yonit Naaman, essayist, editor, and researcher
- Golan Pollack (born 1991), Olympic judoka
- Shlomi Shabat, vocalist
