= Menahemia =

Village in northern Israel

Menahemia: מְנַחֶמְיָה (Hebrew)

Hebrew transcription(s)
  - Standard: Menahemya
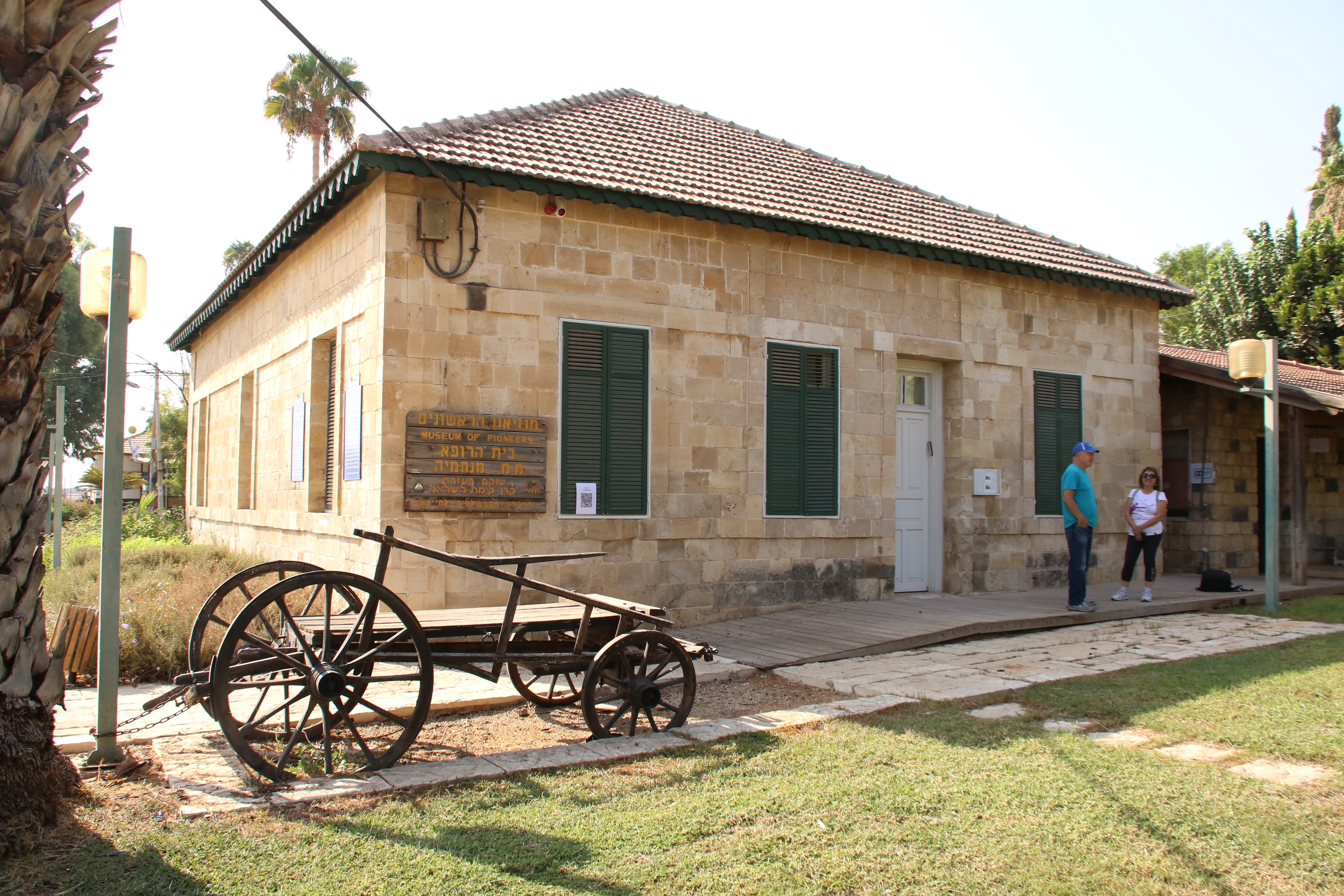

- Location within Northeast Israel
- Coordinates: 32°40′4″N 35°33′14″E
- Country: Israel
- District: Northern
- Subdistrict: Jezreel
- Council: Valley of Springs
- Founded: 1901
- Population (2024): 1,201

Menahemia (Hebrew: מְנַחֶמְיָה) is a village in the Jordan Valley in north-eastern Israel. Located near Highway 90 between Beit She'an and Tzemah Junction 5 km south of Tzemah, it falls under the jurisdiction of Valley of Springs Regional Council. With an area of 6,000 dunams, the village had a population of 1,201 in 2024.

== History ==
The village was established on 23–26 December 1901 as a moshava under the name Milhamia (Hebrew: מלחמיה) by the five first families on land purchased by the Jewish Colonisation Association (ICA) in the Jordan Valley, and was the first Jewish settlement of its time in that region. It was renamed Menahemia in 1921 after the father of High Commissioner of Mandatory Palestine Herbert Samuel, 1st Viscount Samuel.

The village attracted new immigrants from Yemen during its nascent years, but because of cultural differences with the older residents, the Yemenites moved out and settled in the Shaʿaraim neighborhood of Rehovot.

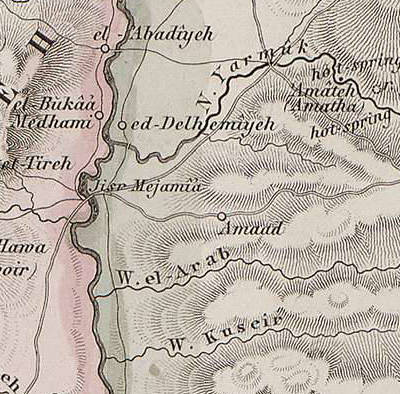
The area in 1858; the area of Menahemia was known as el-Bukaa Medhami, which was south of al-'Ubaydiyya, west of al-Dalhamiyya, and north of Jisr el-Majami

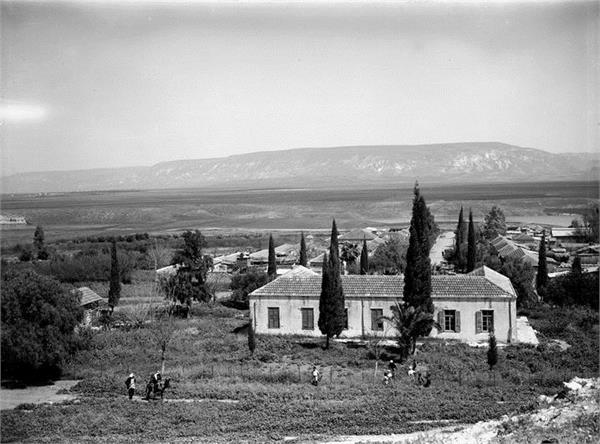
Menahemia 1920

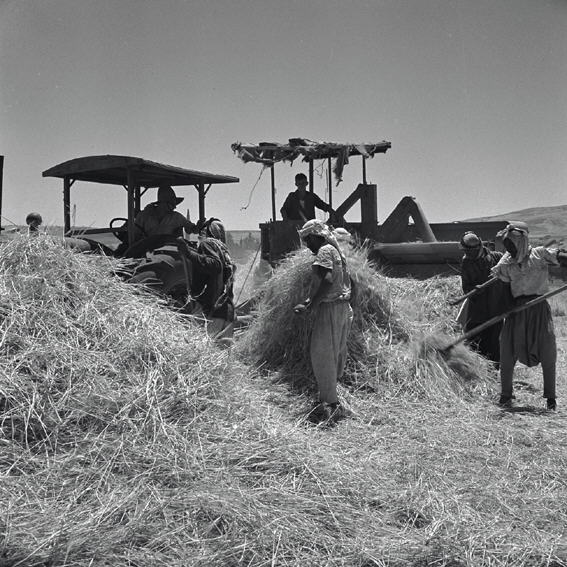
Arab labourers threshing, Menahemia, 1947

== Economy ==
Before World War I, a regional pharmacy was established in Menahemia. Other industries included a quarry, where they quarried raw materials for the Nesher cement factory near Haifa, and a gypsum manufacturing plant. There was also a museum for the medical history of the region, and the history of Menahemia and Naharayim.

Menahemia had its own local council from 1951 until 1 January 2006 when jurisdiction over the village was transferred to Beit She'an Valley Regional Council.

== See also ==
- Benny Shalita
