= How to Be Alone (2016 film) =

- Movie Poster
- Eich Lihiyot Levad
- Directed by: Erez Eisenstein
- Written by: Erez Eisenstein
- Based on: How To Be AloneOrna Coussin
- Produced by: Erez Eisenstein
- Starring: Nili Tserruya; Ofri Fuchs; Lia Friedman; Or Ilan-Cohen
- Narrated by: Rami Baruch
- Cinematography: Gleb Volkov
- Edited by: Oz Mikulsky
- Music by: Ariel Guez
- Release date: April 16, 2016 (LGBT Film Festival)
- Running time: 22 minutes
- Country: Israel
- Language: Hebrew

How to Be Alone (Hebrew: איך להיות לבד, romanized: Eich Lihiyot Levad) is a 2016 short Israeli student film, produced and directed by Erez Eisenstein. The script is an adaptation of a short story of the same name by Orna Coussin, first published in 2006.

The world premiere of the film took place in Palace of Culture and Science, on 16 April 2016, as part of Poland's LGBT Film Festival.

== Plot ==
A brokenhearted lesbian woman (Nili Tserruya) grapples with her lonely existence as a singleton. She decides to walk on a different path than the majority. Tired by the constant struggle to fit in a perfectly happy society, she chooses to explore herself and teach herself how to embrace solitude and transgress the mundane world.

== Cast ==
Main cast

- Nili Tserruya
- Ofri Fuchs
- Lia Friedman
- Or Ilan-Cohen
- Rami Baruch as the author

Extended cast

- Shlomi BiBi
- Addi Gefen
- Batzion Rogozinsky
- Mya Kaplan
- Mor Granit
- Maayan Shay

== Festivals ==
Festivals
#	Event name	Date(s)	Location(s)	Ref.
1	7th LGBT Film Festival 2016	16 April 2016	(Poland) Warsaw, Łódź, Gdańsk, Poznań and Katowice	
2	QFest	27 April 2016	(United States) St. Louis	
3	31st Torino Gay & Lesbian Film Festival	8 May 2016	(Italy) Turin	
4	OutlantaCon	May 2016	(United States) Atlanta	
5	8th KASHISH Mumbai International Queer Film Festival	27 May 2016	(India) Mumbai	
6	TLVFest #11 the 11th Tel Aviv International LGBT Film Festival	30 May 2016	(Israel) Tel Aviv	
7	Sun & Sand - The Mississippi Film & Music Festival	June 2016	(United States) Biloxi	
8	5th Bangalore Shorts Film Festival 2016	12 June 2016	(India) Bangalore	
9	13th OutfestPeru 2016	27 June 2016	(Peru) Lima	
10	Montefeltro Film School Festival	19 July 2016	(Italy) Pennabilli	
11	Macon Film Festival	23 July 2016	(United States) Macon	
12	5th Kolkata Shorts International Film Festival 2016	24 July 2016	(India) Kolkata	
13	The 6th Annual Durban Gay & Lesbian Film Festival	27 August 2016	(South Africa) Durban	
14	The Atlanta LGBT Film & Music Festival	August 2016	(United States) Atlanta	
15	Verona International Film Festival	September 2016	(Italy) Venice	
16	Great Lakes International Film Festival	September 2016	(United States) Erie	
17	18th Thessaloniki International LGBTIQ Film Festival	24 September 2016	(Greece) Thessaloniki	
18	29th Girona Film Festival	29 September 2016	(Spain) Girona	
19	10th Iris Prize	15 October 2016	(United Kingdom) Cardiff	
20	The Barcelona International Gay and Lesbian Film Festival	22 October 2016	(Spain) Barcelona	
21	Perlen - Queer Film Festival Hannover	22 October 2016	(Germany) Hanover	
22	Festival de Cine Lesbico, Gay Bi Trans	29 October 2016	(Chile) Santiago	
23	LesGaiCineMad	4 November 2016	(Spain) Madrid	
24	St. Louis International Film Festival	6 November 2016	(United States) St. Louis	
25	Gay Film Nights	14 November 2016	(Romania) Cluj-Napoca	
26	TRANSITION International Queer Minorities Film Festival	15 November 2016	(Austria) Vienna	
27	UK Jewish Film Festival	19 November 2016	(United Kingdom) London	
28	Videodrunk	2 December 2016	(Canada) Toronto	
29	IMAGE+NATION Montreal lesbian gay bi trans film festival	3 December 2016	(Canada) Montreal	
30	9th OMOVIES - Lesbian Gay Transgender and Questioning Film Festival	15 December 2016	(Italy) Naples	
31	New Renaissance Film Festival	5 March 2017	(Netherlands) Amsterdam	
32	Indian World Film Festival 2017	19 March 2017	(India) Hyderabad	
33	LGBT Toronto Film Festival	27 June 2017	(Canada) Toronto	
34	Berlin Student Film Festival	25 January 2017	(Germany) Berlin	
35	Hyperfest - International Student Film Festival	28 October 2017	(Romania) Bucharest	
36	LGBTQ Film Screening & Party (boombaframe)	12 June 2019	(Israel) Tel Aviv	

== Awards ==
Year	Event	Category	Recipient(s) / Nominee(s)	Result	Ref.
2016	OutlantaCon	Best Student Film	How To Be Alone	Won	
2016	OutlantaCon	Best Director	Erez Eisenstein	Nominated	
2016	OutlantaCon	Best Cinematography	How To Be Alone	Won	
2016	OutlantaCon	Best Performance	Nili Tserruya	Nominated	
2016	TLVFest	Best Israeli Short Film	How To Be Alone; Erez Eisenstein	Won	
2016	Bangalore Shorts Film Festival	Best Cinematography	How To Be Alone; Gleb Volkov (DOP); Erez Eisenstein (producer)	Won	
2016	Macon Film Festival	Best of 'LGBT' Category	How To Be Alone; Erez Eisenstein (director)	Won	
2016	Kolkata Shorts International Film Festival	Best Director (Student)	Erez Eisenstein	Won	
2016	Girona Film Festival	Best Jewish Film	How To Be Alone	Won	
2017	Indian World Film Festival	Best Film (Student)	How To Be Alone	Won	
2017	LGBT Toronto Film Festival	Best Performances	How To Be Alone	Won	
