= HaKibbutz HaMeuhad =

Israeli settlement organization

HaKibbutz HaMeuhad (Hebrew: הקיבוץ המאוחד, lit. 'The United Kibbutz') was a union of kibbutzim. It had been formed in 1927 by the union of several kibbutz bodies and was associated with Ahdut HaAvoda party, it was also aligned with the Habonim youth movement. In 1980 it merged with Ihud HaKvutzot VeHaKibbutzim to form the United Kibbutz Movement which would later become part of the Kibbutz Movement.

== History ==
In 1921 some of the members Gdud HaAvoda formed the Ein Harod kibbutz. Under the leadership of Yitzhak Tabenkin they followed on from there to establish several more kibbutzim. In 1927 they formed HaKibbutz HaMeuhad.

By the 1930s and 1940s it has become the largest kibbutz movement. It was aligned with the Ahdut HaAvoda, which later merged into Mapai.

In 1951 the movement split due to ideological differences between the two socialist parties, Mapai and Mapam, with kibbutzim aligned with Mapai forming Ihud Hakvutzot (which shortly after merged with the older Hever Hakvutzot to form Ihud HaKvutzot VeHaKibbutzim. In some cases, such as Ashdot Ya'akov, kibbutzim were split to two. In other cases the majority supported one movement and the minority moved to a kibbutz of the other movement, with Ihud supporters in Beit HaShita moved to Ayelet HaShahar.

In later years, however, the ideological differences subsided. By 1956 Mapam was no longer aligned with the Soviet Union and by the late 1960s the parties ran together in elections. In 1980 the two movements decided to rejoin and form the United Kibbutz Movement.

== Publishing House ==
The Hakibbutz Hameuhad Publishing House was established in 1939.

In 2001 it merged with Sifriat Poalim Publishing of Hashomer Hatzair to create the Hakibbutz Hameuchad - Sifriat Poalim Publishing Group.
