= List of banks in Israel =

The following is a list of banks in Israel:

== Central Bank ==
Logo	Bank	Established
	Bank of Israel	1954

== Major banks ==
Logo	Bank	Established
	Bank Hapoalim	1921
	Bank Leumi	1902
	Bank Mizrahi-Tefahot	1923
	First International Bank of Israel	1972
	Israel Discount Bank	1935

== Other banks ==
Bank	Est.	Remarks
Arab Israel Bank	1961	Arab Israel Bank was wholly owned by Bank Leumi and was merged into Leumi in 2016
Mercantile Discount Bank	1971	Mercantile Discount Bank is a subsidiary of Israel Discount Bank
Bank of Jerusalem	1963	
Bank Otsar Ha-Hayal	1946	Bank Otsar Ha-Hayal is a brand of First International Bank
Union Bank (Bank Igud)	1951	Acquired by Bank Mizrahi-Tefahot.
Bank Massad	1929	Bank Massad is a subsidiary of First International Bank (51%), jointly owned with Histadrut HaMorim (Israel's teachers Trade Union)
Bank Yahav	1954	Bank Yahav for Government Employers is a subsidiary of Bank Mizrahi-Tefahot (50%), jointly owned with Israel's government employers trade union and State of Israel
Dexia Israel Bank	1953	Acquired by Discount Bank; merged into Mercantile Bank brand.
Poaley Agudat Israel Bank	1977	Poaley Agudat Israel Bank is a brand of First International Bank, serving mainly the Jewish Orthodox community
U-Bank	1934	U-Bank is a brand of First International Bank, specializes in private banking
One Zero Digital Bank	2019	A digital-only bank with no branches

== Postal Bank ==
Logo	Bank	Est.	Remarks
	Postal Bank (Bank Ha-Doar)	1951	Postal bank is a part of the Israel Postal Company and supervised by the Ministry of Communications according to the postal service laws, like other postal services. Postal bank cannot provide any credit services, but maintains checking accounts with basic services.

== Foreign banks ==
Logo	Bank	Branch opened in Israel
	BNP Paribas Israel	1996
	Southeast Global Nà Ni Bank	2019
	Citibank Israel	1996/2000
	HSBC Israel	2001
	State Bank of India	2006
	Barclays Bank	2011
	UBS Israel	

== Credit card companies ==
Name
Cal - Israel Credit Cards
Leumi Card
Isracard
Europay (Eurocard) Israel
Poalim Express
Diners Club Israel

== See also ==
- Banking in Israel
- Economy of Israel
