= Automatic Bank Services =

Israeli company

- Native name: שירותי בנק אוטומטיים
- Type: Public
- Industry: Payment clearing
- Founded: 1978; 48 years ago
- Headquarters: Holon, Israel
- Area served: Israel
- Services: Financial services
- Website: shva.co.il

Automatic Bank Services Ltd. (Hebrew: שירותי בנק אוטומטיים; abbreviated as Shva Hebrew: שבא) is an Israeli company that provides communications and computing services in the banking sector in Israel. Its main field is the clearing of credit card transactions. The company's first CEO, until 1984, was Yoram Elster. After him, for more than thirty years, the CEO was Gideon Milowitzki. CEO Moshe Wolf ended his position at the end of June 2021, as of 2022 the CEO is Eitan Lev Tov. The company's offices were located in "Beit Clal" in Tel Aviv-Yafo, and are currently located in the Azrieli Holon center.

== History ==
The company was established in 1978 as a joint service company of the five major banks: Bank Leumi, Bank Hapoalim, Israel Discount Bank, Mizrahi United Bank and the First International Bank. The goal for which the company was initially established was to establish and operate a network of ATMs in public places, which served the customers of all banks and to link all existing ATMs in Israel, so that all bank customers could withdraw money from any machine. When Israel joined the Swift network in 1982, the Shva assumed responsibility for connecting banks in Israel to this network.

The next stage in the company's development was the establishment of the infrastructure and system for clearing transactions carried out with credit cards in Israel. In contrast to the situation in most countries of the world where several companies provide these services, such as Mastercard, Visa Inc., American Express, and Diners Club International. There is a separation between the service of the bank clearing the payment to the business owner (Acquiring bank or acquirer) and the issuing bank or credit company issuing the cards to customers (Card-issuing bank or card issuer). Shva established a single infrastructure in Israel for all banks and three credit card companies (which were all fully owned by the banks). The Antitrust Commissioner granted the company an exemption from a restrictive arrangement in 2002, and the exemption was renewed every few years. The company also operated as a monopoly in the field of ATMs until the 2000s. It even began to charge mall owners a monthly fee for installing the machines. This situation resulted in no significant competition in Israel in the credit card sector, the barrier to entry into the market was high, and new suppliers did not enter the sector. And the banks had no incentive to improve service or offer new services. For example, the banks did not activate the ATM cards they issued as immediate debit cards for direct payment at businesses, because they preferred that customers use credit cards from which a commission was charged to both the customer and the business.

=== Reform, change of ownership and IPO ===
After many years of lack of competition in the sector, the State of Israel implemented a reform. The first change was implemented following the conclusions of the "Committee for Examining the Reduction of the Use of Cash in the Israeli Economy", headed by Harel Loker, which recommended in March 2014 that banks be required to issue an instant debit card without fees.

As a result of a software glitch in the company, on February 13, 2014, it was not possible to pay by credit card at approximately 10% of businesses in Israel for several hours.

On October 29, 2024, the company was subjected to a denial-of-service cyberattack that caused a nationwide disruption in credit transactions at some businesses. The glitch was fixed within two hours.

In June 2016, the Banking Supervision Department announced that banks would be required to offer customers instant debit cards from the end of 2016.

In June 2015, the "Committee for Increasing Competitiveness in Common Banking and Financial Services" - known as the Strum Committee, was established at the initiative of Finance Minister Moshe Kahlon. The committee's goal was to examine ways to promote competition in credit for households and small businesses, including the separation of credit card companies from banks. Following the Strum Committee, the three largest banks in Israel were required to reduce their holdings of up to 10% of the company Automated Banking Services.

In April 2017, the Bank of Israel granted a clearing license to another company in Israel - Tranzilla, and in March 2018, it also granted a license to Cardcom.

In November 2018, Bank Leumi sold 10% of Shva's shares to Visa International Corporation at a value of NIS 370 million. In April 2019, Bank Hapoalim sold 10% of Shva's shares to MasterCard International Corporation for $11 million.

In May 2019, the banks sold 44% of the company's shares in a sales offer process to institutional investors, at a value of NIS 296 million. The company's shares began trading on the Tel Aviv Stock Exchange on June 12, 2019.

After the company's IPO, the shareholders are:

- Bank Hapoalim 10%
- Bank Leumi 10%
- Israel Discount Bank 10%
- Visa Inc. 10%
- MasterCard Corporation 10%
- First International Bank approximately 9%
- Harel Investments approximately 11%
- The public approximately 30%

== Operations ==
The company operates an interbank communication network, which allows a bank customer to withdraw cash at other banks' ATMs. In credit card clearing, it links the terminals at the points of sale to the credit companies.

For many years, the company operated more than 285 ATMs not adjacent to bank branches, in public places such as shopping centers, hospitals, and universities. In July 2013, the Shva sold this activity to Modi'in Ezrachi for approximately NIS 63 million, following an order from the Antitrust Commissioner, who believed that joint activity by the banks in the ATM sector could lead to a decrease in competition in the industry. However, after acquiring the activity, Modi'in Ezrachi increased the fees and did not bring about competition in the industry.

In August 2013, the head of the Antitrust Authority issued instructions to the company that are intended to make it easier for new competitors to enter the credit card market.

In Israel, there is another company owned by the banks called the Bank Clearing Center, which provides clearing services directly between bank accounts.

=== Services ===
Infrastructure for the services of 6 banks:

- Bank Leumi
- Bank Hapoalim
- Israel Discount Bank
- First International Bank
- Bank Mizrahi-Tefahot
- Bank of Jerusalem

Credit card clearing infrastructure for the 3 credit companies in Israel:

- Max It Finance
- Isracard (owned by Bank Hapoalim)
- Israel Credit Cards (also known as CAL, owned by Discount Bank and the International Bank)
- Operation of ATMs (bank and non-bank) throughout the country
- Management of Bank of Israel tenders (such as the Makamim tenders)

=== Implementation of EMV ===
For many years, the new international standard for credit and debit card security, the EMV standard, was not implemented in Israel. Although the standard has proven itself in reducing fraud rates, banks and credit card companies did not want to make the necessary investment in its implementation. The standard requires the customer to enter their secret code at the payment terminal (instead of signing the receipt, a signature that is easy to forge). The standard began operating in Europe as early as 2006. Following a directive from the Bank of Israel, use of the standard in Israel began in November 2020. Automated Bank Services company is responsible for implementing the technology in Israel.
