= Bank Clearing Center =

Israeli company

- Native name: מרכז סליקה בנקאי
- Type: Public
- Industry: Payment clearing
- Founded: 1978; 48 years ago
- Headquarters: Holon, Israel
- Area served: Israel
- Services: Financial services
- Website: masav.co.il

Bank Clearing Center Ltd. (Hebrew: מרכז סליקה בנקאי; known in its abbrevatiion Masav (Hebrew: Masav) operates the national infrastructure for payment transfers in the Israeli economy. Masav leads the payments and clearing sector in Israel and operates advanced payment transfer systems for tens of thousands of organizations, financial entities and government institutions in Israel. The volume of activity at Masav and the uniqueness of its services make it a central axis of financial activity in Israel. In 2019, Masav began operating an infrastructure for instant payment transfers from account to account and from application to application.

== History ==
The company has been operating since 1982 and is owned by the five largest banks of the Israeli banking system: Bank Leumi, Bank Hapoalim, Israel Discount Bank, Bank Mizrahi-Tefahot, and the First International Bank. The company's first CEO, in its first thirty years, was Gideon Milyotsky. From 2014 to 2021, the company was managed by Moshe Wolf. In 2021, Masav and Automatic Bank Services (Shva) were separated, and Odelia Moshe Ostrovsky was appointed CEO of Masav. As of 2024, Ofir Kadosh has served as the company's CEO.

In 2025, the Competition Commissioner, Adv. Michal Cohen, opposed the extension of the exemption from a restrictive arrangement that allowed the five largest banks - Bank Leumi, Bank Hapoalim, Bank Mizrahi-Tefahot, Israel Discount Bank and the First International Bank, which hold approximately 75% of Masav's shares - to continue to control the company. The Competition Authority expressed concern that the banks' control of the central payment system could allow them to block entities that compete with them, including fintech companies. Following the Commissioner's objection, the banks appealed to the Competition Court, but in April 2026 the Court rejected their position and adopted the Commissioner's recommendation. The banks appealed this decision to the Supreme Court, but in June 2026 they withdrew the appeal after hearing the court's comments regarding the temporary conditions for the continuation of the joint holding. As a result, it was determined that From August 2026, Masav will be subject to conditions designed to reduce the influence of the banks: replacing representatives on the board of directors with two chosen by the company itself, and increasing the involvement of small banks, credit card companies, and fintech companies in its management — until a final decision is made regarding the banks' holding in the company.

== Operations ==
- Mechanized transfer of payments from account to account, such as salary, supplier, and pension payments. Payments are transferred from the organization's bank account directly to the bank accounts of employees and suppliers.
- Infrastructure for transferring instant payments between accounts and between payment applications.
- Collection of charges based on authorization from customers' bank accounts to the bank account of a service provider (such as: electricity, Arnona, tuition, etc.).
- Transfer of information about payments, access to databases (such as: Saving for Every Child, the Population and Immigration Authority at the Ministry of the Interior, Bituah Leumi and more).

== See also ==
- Banking in Israel
- Automatic Bank Services
- Israel Credit Cards
- PayBox
