= PayBox =

Israeli social payment application

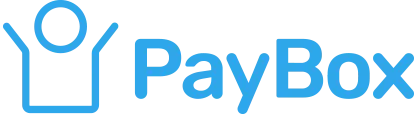
- Initial release: 2014
- Available in: Hebrew
- Website: www.payboxapp.com

PayBox is an Israeli social payment application that facilitates peer-to-peer money transfers, group collections, and payments to businesses. Launched in 2014 by PayBox Ltd, the app was acquired by Israel Discount Bank in 2017 and has since operated as part of the Discount Group.

== History ==
PayBox was founded in 2014 by Tal Greenberg (CEO), Udi Lieberman (VP Marketing), David Rahamim (VP Operations), and Imri Heppner (VP Technologies). The company developed a social payment network aimed at simplifying the execution and management of group payment processes. In 2017, Israel Discount Bank acquired the rights to use the application in Israel, and it continued to operate under the bank's management.

In 2020, PayBox Ltd, the original developer of the app, filed for liquidation due to financial difficulties. However, the application continued to operate normally in Israel under the management of Israel Discount Bank.

== Key features ==
- Instant peer-to-peer transfers: Users can transfer funds instantly using the recipient's phone number, without needing their bank account details.
- Group collections: The app allows users to create groups for joint collections, such as group gifts, social events, or other shared expenses. Each member can view the payment status and easily contribute their share.
- Business payments: Businesses can use PayBox to receive payments from customers, both online and in physical stores, using QR codes or payment links.
- Digital credit card: In 2022, PayBox launched a free digital credit card, enabling users to pay directly from their app balances, both in physical stores using Tap technology and online. The digital card does not incur card fees and offers users flexibility and convenience in payments.
- Interest on balances: During 2023, PayBox began offering an annual interest rate of 3% on personal balances within the app, providing users with an alternative to traditional banks, where checking account funds typically do not earn interest.

=== Usage limits and restrictions ===
The service is free for users but has certain limits on transfer and accumulation amounts:

- A single payment is limited to 1,500 ₪.
- Total daily or monthly payments are limited to 7,500 ₪.
- The combined personal and group balance is limited to 25,000 ₪ at any given time.
- Total withdrawals and receipts are limited to 50,000 ₪ per year.

== Competitors in the Israeli market ==
In Israel, other payment applications operate, such as bit by Bank Hapoalim and Pepper Pay by Bank Leumi. These apps offer similar services for transferring funds between individuals and payments to businesses.
