= IDB =

IDB can mean:

== Financial ==
- Inter-American Development Bank, the largest source of development financing for Latin America and the Caribbean
- Islamic Development Bank, a multilateral development financing institution
- Israel Discount Bank, an Israeli banking service
- IDB Bank, a New York-based subsidiary bank of Israel Discount Bank
- IDB Development Company, an Israeli investment group related to Israel Discount Bank

== Government ==
- Industrial Development Boards, groups set up under the Industrial Organisation and Development Act 1947 for sector-wide coordination
- Industrial Development Board for Northern Ireland, a government agency in Northern Ireland now part of Invest Northern Ireland
- Industrial Development Bureau, an agency of the Ministry of Economic Affairs of the Republic of China
- Inlichtingendienst Buitenland, former name of the General Intelligence and Security Service of the Netherlands
- Internal drainage board, a type of English and Welsh water level management authority
- US Census Bureau International Data Base, a database maintained by the US Census Bureau to provide public information about the census

== Technology ==
- IDB Communications Group, Inc., a constituent of WorldCom
- IndexedDB, an application programming interface for databases
- Intel Debugger, a proprietary debugger
- Interface Descriptor Block, a Cisco IOS internal data structure that contains information on network data
- Internal data buses, a form of hardware bus

== Other uses ==
- Industrial Development Revenue Bonds, a former name for industrial revenue bonds in the United States
- Intelligent drum and bass, a sub-genre of drum and bass music
- Involuntary denied boarding, a passenger being prevented from boarding an overbooked airline flight
- Irish Dairy Board, the former name of Irish dairy co-operative Ornua

== See also ==
- Industrial Development Bank, various banks with that name
