= Dan Amiram =

Israeli professor of business (born 1977)

- דן עמירם
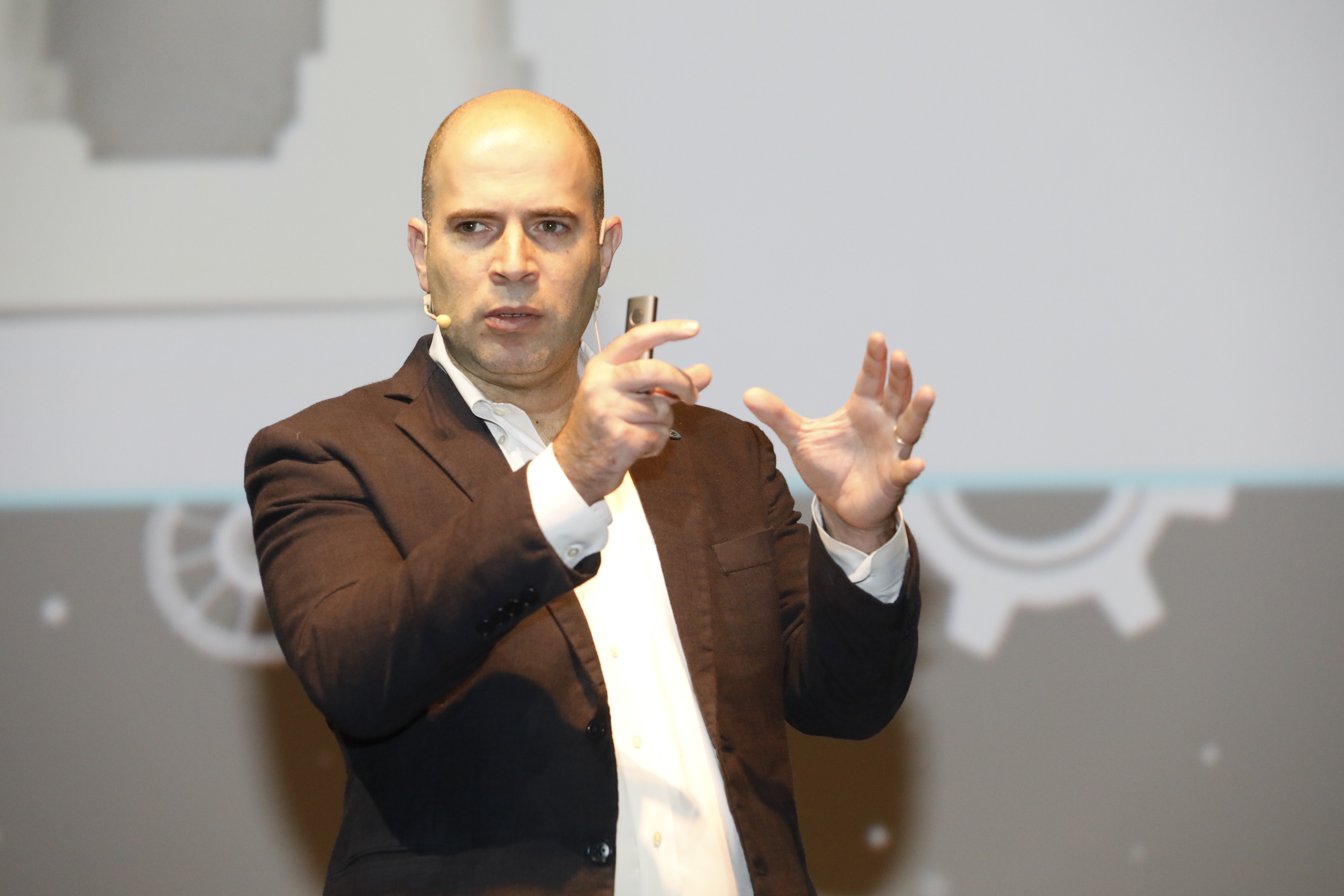
- Born: 6 July 1977 (age 49)
- Education: Ben-Gurion University, University of North Carolina at Chapel Hill
- Scientific career
- Fields: Accounting; Business; Financial economics
- Workplaces: Columbia University, Tel Aviv University
- Thesis: Debt Contracts and Loss Given Default (2011)

Dan Amiram (Hebrew: דן עמירם; born: 6 July 1977) is the Co-Head of the Joseph Institute and the Joseph Safra Capital Markets and Financial Institutions Chaired Professor of Business at the Coller School of Management at Tel Aviv University. He previously served as the Dean of the school. He also serves as the head of the Fintech concentration in the MBA program. He served and currently serves on public companies' board of directors in the United States and Israel.

== Early life and education ==
Dan Amiram was born in Be'er-Sheva, Israel. He studied at "Makif Gimel" high school in the city. He served in the Israel Defense Forces and is a major (Res.). After his military service he received his BA in Economics and Accounting (2003), and MA in Economics (2007) from Ben-Gurion University, Israel. During his M.A. studies Amiram worked for PricewaterhouseCoopers (PwC) – Kesselman & Kesselman as an Auditor and later as part of the finance division in Adama (formerly Makhteshim–Agan Industries LTD). His PhD degree was received in 2011 from the University of North Carolina at Chapel Hill. Amiram authored the thesis Debt Contracts and Loss Given Default, under the supervision of Prof. Wayne R. Landsman and Prof. Robert M. Bushman.

== Career ==
In 2011, Amiram moved to New York City and joined Columbia University Graduate School of Business as assistant professor of Accounting, Business Law and Taxation. He became the Philip H. Geier Associate Professor of Business at that school in 2016. During his stay in New York, Amiram started to serve on the board of directors, including as chairman of the audit committee of various public and private corporations. In 2017 Amiram was a visiting professor at Tel Aviv University, and a year later he joined the Coller School of Management at Tel Aviv University as a full professor. In 2020 Amiram was appointed to be TAU Capital markets and Financial Institutions Chaired Professor of Business, which was dedicated in 2021 by TAU to Joseph Safra. Amiram also serves the head of the Fintech concentration in the MBA program at the university.

== Research ==
Professor Amiram's research focuses on the effects and consequences of frictions created by information asymmetry, taxation and business law on debt and equity markets around the world. He has conducted research in the areas of debt contracting, executive compensation, banking, international taxation, foreign investments, financial distress and financial reporting fraud and misconduct that was published in finance and accounting journals. Professor Amiram's research provides evidence that information, taxation and business law play a significant role in investors' decision-making processes and shape the design of contracts and the financial system.

== Professional experience ==
Upon his return to Israel (2017), Amiram joined the board of directors of Mercantile Bank and also serves as the chairman of the Board's Risk Management committee.

He is also the chairman of the United Nations Internal controls Advisory Committee. Amiram served and currently serves on the board of directors, including as chairman of the audit committee, of various public and private corporations and financial institutions, and is asked by governmental organizations, corporations, financial institutions to advise on issues in the areas of his expertise, including risk management, fraud prevention and recovery, capital markets trading strategies, financing, valuation and others. Amiram serves as a board member in the Israeli Association for Appraisers.

In 2019, Amiram was approached to serve as the Deputy Governor of the Bank of Israel.

In 2021 Amiram joined the board of we-Sure and was one of the founders of Cytactic.

== Honors and awards ==
Amiram received awards for excellence in research and teaching, including the 2017 AAA/Deloitte Foundation Wildman Medal Award for "research published during the five calendar years preceding the year of the award, which is judged to have made the most significant contribution to the advancement of the practice of public accountancy"; the Coller School of Management at Tel-Aviv University Award for Teaching Excellence (2019) and the Columbia Business School Award for Teaching Excellence (2013).

== Media ==
Amiram's research and opinions were featured in The Wall Street Journal, The New York Times, Forbes and other media organizations.

== Selected articles ==
- Amiram, D., Bauer, A. and Frank, M.M., 2019 Forthcoming. "Tax Avoidance at Public Corporations Driven by Shareholder Taxes: Evidence from Changes in Dividend Tax Policy". The Accounting Review
- Amiram, D., Kalay, A., Kalay, A. and Ozel, N.B., 2018. Information Asymmetry and the Bond Coupon Choice. The Accounting Review. 93(2), pp. 37–59.
- Amiram, D., Bozanic, Z., Cox, J.D., Dupont, Q., Karpoff, J.M. and Sloan, R.G., 2018. Financial Reporting Fraud and Other Forms of Misconduct: A Multidisciplinary Review of the Literature. Review of Accounting Studies, 23(2), pp. 732–783.
- Amiram, D., Beaver, W.H., Landsman, W.R. and Zhao, J., 2017. The effects of credit default swap trading on information asymmetry in syndicated loans. Journal of Financial Economics, 126(2), pp. 364–382.
- Amiram, D., Kalay, A. and Sadka, G., 2016. Industry characteristics, risk premiums, and debt pricing. The Accounting Review, 92(1), pp. 1–27.
- Amiram, D., Owens, E. and Rozenbaum, O., 2016. Do information releases increase or decrease information asymmetry? New evidence from analyst forecast announcements. Journal of Accounting and Economics, 62(1), pp. 121–138.
- Amiram, D. and Frank, M.M., 2015. Foreign portfolio investment and shareholder dividend taxes. The Accounting Review, 91(3), pp. 717–740.
- Amiram, D., Bozanic, Z. and Rouen, E., 2015. Financial statement errors: Evidence from the distributional properties of financial statement numbers. Review of Accounting Studies, 20(4), pp. 1540–1593.
- Galil, K., Shapir, O.M., Amiram, D. and Ben-Zion, U., 2014. The determinants of CDS spreads. Journal of Banking & Finance, 41, pp. 271–282.

== Personal life ==
Amiram is married to Dr. Miriam. They have a son and a daughter and live in Be'er Sheva.
