= Israel Credit Cards =

Israeli payment card company

Israel Credit Cards Ltd
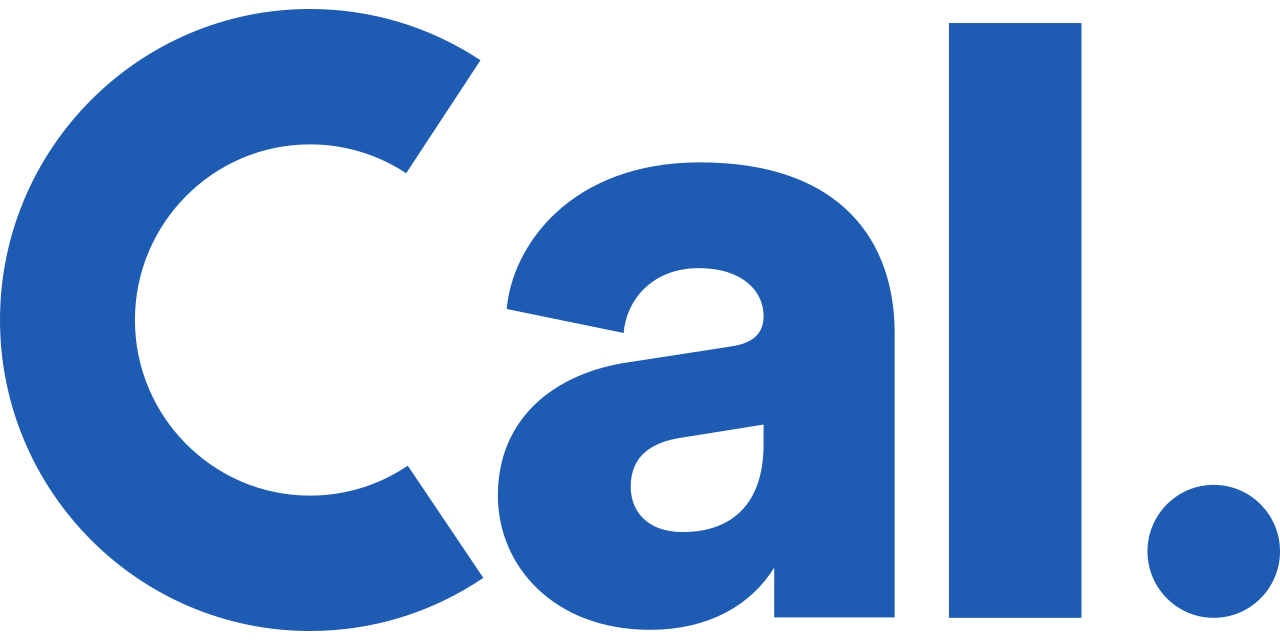
- Native name: כרטיסי אשראי לישראל בע"מ
- Industry: Financial services
- Founded: 1979; 47 years ago
- Founder: Israel Discount Bank; Bank Leumi
- Headquarters: Bnei Brak, Israel
- Key people: Yafit Gariani, (CEO)
- Owner: Israel Discount Bank (71.84%); First International Bank (28.16%)
- Number of employees: 1,500
- Website: cal-online.co.il

Israel Credit Cards Ltd. (Hebrew: כרטיסי אשראי לישראל בע"מ), also known by the Cal (Hebrew: כאל) brand and its historical name "C.A.L" (Hebrew: כ.א.ל or by the nickname "Visa Cal" (Hebrew: ויזה כאל, is a company operating in the Israeli credit card market in two areas of activity: issuing debit cards, especially credit cards, and clearing credit card transactions. The company was founded in 1979 by Bank Leumi and Israel Discount Bank. It is currently jointly owned by Israel Discount Bank (71.84%) and the First International Bank of Israel (28.16%). The company is headquartered in Bnei Brak with additional offices in the illegal settlement Modi'in Illit, and employs approximately 1,500 employees.

== Ηistory ==
Visa cards were first issued in Israel by Bank Leumi starting in May 1978 by Leumi Card, a subsidiary of the bank established for the purpose of issuing the cards. Initially, cards were issued for use abroad only, and in September 1978, issuance of cards for use in Israel began. The local cards were called Leumi Card and the cards intended for use abroad were called "Leumicard-Visa".

In June 1979, Bank Leumi and Israel Discount Bank signed an agreement to establish the "Israel Credit Cards" company. The company was jointly owned by Bank Leumi (65%) and Discount Bank (35%). C.A.L was established when Discount Bank joined the "Visa" card network in Israel and was intended to manage the issuance and operation of cards for the two participating bank groups together. In the same month, Discount Bank began issuing Visa cards under the name "Ashrait" (Hebrew: אשראית.

Later, other credit card companies also began distributing Visa cards: in 1990, it was Bank Hapoalim through "Aminit", a subsidiary of the Isracard conglomerate, "Visa Alpha" of Alpha Card in 1998-2000 (with a franchise from 1996), and Leumi Card starting in 2001. In 1992, Cal acquired "Diners Club Israel", the local franchisee of the Diners Club International credit card brand. Since 2001, it has been issuing MasterCard cards.

The loss of exclusivity over the issuance of Visa cards in Israel has resulted in significant savings for the company's customers, with the cancellation of membership fees and many commissions on the cards that Cal will operate, alongside improved financing terms for customers who require credit services. However, as market shares in the industry stabilized, it again raised fees and interest rates on credit (along with developing new credit solutions).

In early 2000, following a demand from the regulator, the banks dissolved their partnership in the company and, in a bidding war, Discount surprisingly won the right to purchase Leumi's share. Discount Bank purchased Leumi's shares in the company and immediately sold 20% to the First International Bank, 24% to Eliezer Fishman, and 5% to Harel Investments. Bank Leumi subsequently established "Leumi Card" and most of its customers left CAL and moved to CAL. The International Bank brought its customers to CAL, thus adding about 200,000 customers to the company. Fishman sold his holdings in the company in 2006 to Discount Bank and the First International Bank. In early 2007, Harel sold its holdings in the company to Discount Bank and First International Bank.

Between 2017 and 2023, Cal doubled its transaction turnover and the company's active customer base grew twice as much as its competitors - Cal grew by 1.35 million active cards, more than the two competitors combined (during the same period, Max grew by 600,000, Isracard by 700,000). In 2018, Discount Bank CEO Lilach Topolovsky appointed Levi Halevi to the position of CEO of the company.

In 2024, the company left its offices in Givatayim, where it had been located for decades, in favor of an office tower in Bnei Brak owned by Phoenix Financial. This was in contrast to the original plan to move to the Elef Complex together with Discount.

At the end of 2025, an agreement was signed according to which Discount Bank and the First International Bank would sell their holdings in the company to Union Group, controlled by George Horesh, and Harel Investments. The transaction requires regulatory approval to complete.

== Operations ==
=== Issuance ===
Cal is engaged in the issuance of credit cards and operates within the framework of three major payment networks. It issues Visa and MasterCard cards and holds the exclusive right to issue Diners Club International cards in the Israeli market. The company divides its issuance activity into two main categories, based on the distribution mechanism and the required cooperation: the first group includes bank cards, issued for customers of certain banks that have signed an agreement with Cal. The second group is directly issued ("non-bank") cards, issued directly to customers by Cal itself, independent of a particular bank.

Starting in 2001, the company significantly expanded its portfolio of financial products for customers who use the non-bank credit cards issued by it, usually through an affiliated legal entity (Cal Financing Ltd.). This activity allows the company to provide a solution to the diverse credit needs of customers on two main levels. The first level is providing direct loans to customers for general and unspecified uses, not directly related to a specific purchase. The second level focuses on providing flexibility and cash flow solutions for managing card transactions, including "credit" transactions (purchases with interest), postponing the monthly payment date (deferred charges), spreading the total monthly charge amount into several smaller payments - an option that can be made both before and after the billing date, as well as cash withdrawals that can be spread over payments. In this way, the company has become an entity that combines credit card services with retail financing and credit services.

=== Clearing ===
Cal exclusively clears Visa, MasterCard and Diners Club International credit cards. As of 2012, it has also cleared local cards under the Isracard brand. Since 2001, the company has been engaged (and since the end of 2003 also through a subsidiary) in providing a discount service to businesses. The discount is carried out against payment transaction vouchers and regular transactions, i.e. the business is credited with a single immediate payment minus an agreed discount fee. The company offers businesses affiliated with it in clearing agreements a variety of programs to advance the regular credit date, in exchange for the payment of fees for the advance payment by the company. The company also offers some of the businesses with which it is affiliated an advance on the account of the future credit balances they are expected to receive for regular transaction vouchers.

The company is engaged in providing settlement services for transactions carried out via the Internet for various businesses in Israel and abroad.

=== Allocation of credit ===
In the past, and for the minority of cards currently (with bank issuers in an issuance arrangement with it, the most prominent of which is Bank Mizrahi-Tefahot), Cal's credit allocation method is different and varies depending on the brand. The uniform credit limit for the account does exist on Diners Club and MasterCard cards, but it is separate for each brand and is called a "credit ceiling".

The situation is different with Visa cards, where the limits on card usage are split into a number of separate credit allocations and in each case, are measured at the specific card level; All uses that are charged to the card no later than the next monthly billing date use the card's "withdrawal limit," which is reset every month. Future and deferred charges on the card use the card's "credit limit", which accumulates the balance of unpaid transactions from month to month.[5] This means that a payment on a payment transaction, for example, gives way to the utilization of the card's credit limit and instead uses the card's withdrawal limit.

This division sometimes overlaps: A cash withdrawal on a Visa card as a banker according to the old format uses the card's withdrawal limit, even though it is approved primarily based on the daily withdrawal limit defined by the card issuer. Abroad, a quarterly withdrawal limit is defined, which is 3 times higher than the monthly withdrawal limit in Israel, and it accumulates transactions and withdrawals from abroad. If an automatic credit plan has been set up on the card for charges from abroad, its credit balance will also utilize the credit limit on the card.
