= Moshe Mandelbaum =

Israeli economist, 4th Governor of the Bank of Israel

- משה מנדלבאום

4th Governor of the Bank of Israel
- In office 1982–1986
- Preceded by: Arnon Gafni
- Succeeded by: Michael Bruno

Personal details
- Born: 1933 Jerusalem, Mandatory Palestine
- Died: December 14, 2020 (aged 86–87) Jerusalem, Israel
- Education: Hebrew University (BA, MA); Vanderbilt University (PhD)

Academic background
- Influences: Don Patinkin

Academic work
- Discipline: Macroeconomics

Moshe Yaakov Mandelbaum (Hebrew: משה יעקב מנדלבאום; 1933 – December 14 2020) was an Israeli economist who served as Governor of the Bank of Israel (1982–86).

== Early life ==
Moshe Mandelbaum was born in Jerusalem, Mandatory Palestine in 1933, the son of Rabbi Simcha Mandelbaum and Dvora Mandelbaum. As a child, he attended Lomza Yeshiva in Petah Tikva, Hebron Yeshiva, and Ponevezh Yeshiva in Bnei Brak.

Mandelbaum earned his bachelor's and master's degrees in economics at the Hebrew University of Jerusalem. During his time as a student, he was a member of a group of academic disciples of monetary economist Don Patinkin, known informally as "Patinkin's Boys", who would go on to heavily influence Israel's late 20th-century economic policy.

Mandelbaum earned his doctorate in economics from Vanderbilt University in 1968 upon returning to Nashville, Tennessee several years after completing his degree work to defend his thesis.

== Public service career ==
=== Israeli Ministry of Trade and Industry (1956-1978) ===
While pursuing his studies at Hebrew University, Mandelbaum began working at Israel's Ministry of Trade and Industry as a staff economist in 1956. He was appointed chief economist of the Industry Division in 1962. From 1964-1965, he served as Director of the Planning Department. During the tenure of minister Haim Yosef Zadok, Mandelbaum was also appointed economic advisor to the minister and chief economist of the ministry as a whole.

In 1966, Ze'ev Sherf took over the Ministry, and retained Mandelbaum as an economic advisor. In 1967, Sherf appointed him head of the Food and Chemicals division and designated him commissioner of price controls.

In 1974, under the leadership of Haim Bar-Lev, Mandelbaum was appointed Director General of the Ministry of Trade and Industry. He retained the role within the newly restructured Ministry of Industry, Trade and Tourism.

=== Bank of Israel (1981–1986) ===
In 1981, Mandelbaum served as Deputy Governor of the Bank of Israel under Arnon Gafni.

Following Gafni's resignation in 1982, then-finance minister Yoram Aridor recommended Mandelbaum as his successor. He was appointed as the 4th Governor of the Bank of Israel by the Cabinet of Prime Minister Menachem Begin with approval signed by President Yitzhak Navon.

As governor, Mandelbaum inherited a ballooning balance-of-payments deficit in Israel brought on by the 1982 Lebanon War and a growing inflation crisis. Throughout the early 1980s, inflation in Israel had surged through multiple rate hikes and peaked at 450% in 1984. Mandelbaum's tenure as governor was also complicated by the 1983 Israel bank stock crisis, in which the stocks of the four largest banks in Israel collapsed after they were no longer adequately capitalized to boost their stock prices via share repurchase.

In 1985, Governor Mandelbaum worked in partnership with Prime Minister Shimon Peres and Finance Minister Yitzhak Moda'i to implement Israel's sweeping Economic Stabilization Plan, which marked a turning point in Israel's economic and fiscal policy. The Economic Stabilization Plan was developed in conjunction with prominent economists, including Stanley Fischer and Mandelbaum's Bank of Israel successor Michael Bruno. Under new amendments to the Bank of Israel Law, the central bank was no longer permitted to lend to the government to bridge budget shortfalls and the shekel was replaced by the Israeli new shekel at a rate of IS 1,000 to ₪1. In addition to commitments to higher interest rates and exchange rate stabilization as per the Economic Stabilization Plan, Mandelbaum throughout his tenure as governor promoted de-interventionist governance and fiscal retrenchment in the form of tax cuts paired with subsidy cuts.

In the wake of the Bejski Commission inquiry into the 1983 bank stock crisis, Mandelbaum submitted his resignation from the Bank of Israel in 1986, conceding that he did not intercede quickly enough, fearing that aggressive intervention would have precipitated accelerated market panic and capital flight from the shekel to US dollars.

== Academic career ==
Alongside his career in public service, Mandelbaum served for decades as an economics professor at various Israeli academic institutions, including a 38-year career on the Department of Economics staff of Bar-Ilan University, where he served as a senior lecturer from 1970-2001.

Mandelbaum retired from the university in 2001 and thereafter taught coursework at Netanya Academic College and Ashkelon Academic College.

== Personal life ==
Mandelbaum had three children with his wife, Sara. He died on December 14th, 2020 at the age of 87.

== See also ==
- 1983 Israel bank stock crisis
