= 1983 Israel bank stock crisis =

1983 financial crisis in Israel

The bank stock crisis was a financial crisis that occurred in Israel in 1983, during which the stocks of the four largest banks in Israel collapsed. In previous episodes of share price weakness, the banks bought back their own stocks, creating the appearance of constant demand for the stock, and artificially supporting their values. By October 1983, the banks no longer had the capital to buy back shares, causing share prices to collapse. The Tel Aviv Stock Exchange closed for eighteen days beginning October 6, 1983, whilst a recovery plan was implemented and the banks were nationalized.

== History ==
In the 1970s, Bank Hapoalim, and its manager, Yaakov Levinson, sought to control the bank's stock price on the Tel Aviv Stock Exchange by recommending to their customers that they invest in the bank's stocks, fraudulently providing guarantees that the share prices would rise indefinitely. These investments allowed the bank to increase its available capital for investments, loans, etc. The bank also gave out generous loans to allow the customers to continue their investments, also profiting from the interest.

In practice, the banks loaned capital for clients to buy the bank's own stocks. While being a loop rather than a "pyramid", this scheme was precarious. This very high leverage requires strict risk control based on transparency. However, because the capital changed hands multiple times between banks and their clients-investors, the real degree of leverage was hidden from involved parties as well as government regulatory bodies.

Other banks joined the practice, called adjustments. Eventually all major banks manipulated their stock price this way, among them Bank Leumi, Discount Bank, Bank Igud, Bank HaMizrachi, and Bank Clali (General Bank, now U-Bank). The only bank not to join in was First International Bank of Israel (FIBI).

The adjustments were performed through the use of other companies. For example, Bank Leumi used the "Jewish Colonial Trust Holdings and Development Company". The funding for these actions originated in loans from the bank's pension funds and similar sources. Sometimes the banks would practice mutual purchases – one bank would sell its stocks to a second bank, and buy the second bank's stocks for a similar sum.

Under pressure from the Israeli Securities and Exchange Commission, the banks reported the adjustments in their reports, but these reports were partial, misleading, and sometimes even false. Toward their clients the banks acted in a manner later described by the Bejski Commission as based on their own interests, ignoring the clients' interests.

The adjustments were made possible, in large part, by the banks' ownership structure. Bank Hapoalim was controlled by the Histadrut labor union's Workers Company (Hevrat HaOvdim), and Bank Leumi by the "Jewish Colonial Trust". The Hapoel HaMizrachi organization had almost none of Bank HaMizrachi's ordinary stocks, but all of its controlling shares. The owners' representatives were usually members of the ruling political parties (especially the Alignment, and the National Religious Party, or close to them). The banks' managers ran the banks for owners who understood little of banking and did not involve themselves in these actions. The fourth major bank to join this practice, Discount Bank, was different, insofar as management and control had not been ceded to outside managers.

Also contributing to the possibility of the adjustment was the capital structure of the Israeli market. During the early years of the state, the governments used the banks as a channel for procuring capital, and instructed them on how to invest their funds. This level of control, coupled with the control of interest rates, allowed the government to effectively "print money", by getting the banks to buy government bonds. Additionally, the banks usually assumed that since their investments and loans in major players of the Israeli market, such as the kibbutzim, were according to the government's wishes, the government would guarantee these loans.

The banks used the adjustments to issue more and more stocks, until, during the 1980s, bank stocks accounted for more than 90% of all issued shares on the stock market. They used the capital thus gained to give out loans and make investments. The banks also grew exponentially, building hundreds of new branches and hiring thousands of new employees.

All of the regulatory bodies were well aware of the adjustments regime, but aside from slight warnings, easily dismissed by the banks' managers, they did nothing, failing even to warn the public. The Minister of the Finance, Yoram Aridor, even remarked on television that had he had the funds to do so, he would invest in the stock market.

The adjustments were based on the promise of a constant rise in the banks' stock prices, irrespective of the economic situation. The artificial prices thus achieved created an economic bubble, where everyone involved continued to invest increasing sums of money for lesser returns. Every new issue of bank stocks further destabilized them, since more of the capital was invested in maintaining the adjustment regime instead of profitable loans. Also, as the market share of bank stocks grew, the adjustments became weaker, as every cent (agora, actually) invested by the banks became a smaller part of the total invested capital.

The real return (i.e. over and above the Consumer Price Index) on investment in the banks' stocks diminished, from a 41% return in 1980, to 34% in 1981, to 28% in 1982. Other investment options, especially purchasing U.S. dollars became more appealing, and the banks had to transfer more and more funds from their offshore tax havens to keep maintaining the illusion of safety of investing in their stocks.

== Crisis ==
In early 1983, share prices across all non-financial stocks on the Tel Aviv Stock Exchange suffered from weakness. The banks invested heavily in all issues, hoping to maintain liquidity in the market. From January through March, some regulators, among them Finance Minister Aridor and Bank of Israel Governor Moshe Mendelbaum, approached the banks several times, trying to get them to gradually reduce their adjustments. Although some bank managers realized they could not continue this for long, they did not stop. Fearing a market collapse, Finance Ministry officials kept knowledge of this from the public.

However, the 8% devaluation in August was far too small to accomplish the purpose. Additionally, the supplies in the stock market grew steadily, and reached new heights in September. The public unrelentingly sold bank stocks, and purchased U.S. dollars. Failing to stop the banks, Finance Ministry officials wished to execute a large devaluation of the Shekel as an excuse to stop the adjustments.

Bank stocks remained under pressure. On October 2, the first trading day after the Sukkot holiday, the public sold more bank stocks than in the entire month of September. On October 4, the Minister of Finance appeared on television saying, "We will not let the public dictate our moves," to say the large supplies would not bring about a devaluation or change of policy.

Aridor later met with the banks' managers, who demanded the government limit the public's purchases of U.S. dollars, and allow it only for plane tickets. They assumed that without an option to save the money themselves, due to the high inflation, the public would be forced to invest in the banks' stocks. Even if their thesis was correct, one can assume such a move would only fuel the panic, and exacerbate the crisis.

On October 5, the stock exchange again opened with large numbers of sell offers, and on October 6, 1983, nicknamed "Black Thursday", there was an onslaught of sales. It was clear a collapse was a matter of days away at most, since the banks declared that day they would be unable to absorb additional supplies without government assistance.

That night, in a meeting at Aridor's home, it was decided that the government would purchase the banks' stocks from the public, to prevent the loss of their investments. On Sunday, October 9, the stock exchange remained closed, and stayed closed till October 24. In the meantime the shekel was devalued by 23%. The stocks sold by the public were bought by the Bank of Israel (the nation's central bank) at an average loss of 17%. Eventually, 35% of the stocks' value was lost.

== Results ==
The immediate consequences of the crisis were the loss of a third of the public's investments in the banks, the acquisition of the banks by the government at a total cost of $6.9 billion (for reference, Israel's entire GDP in 1983 was about $27 billion), and the nationalization of the major banks (Leumi, Hapoalim, HaMizrachi, Discount, and Clali).

Executives of each of the banks were convicted of criminal charges. Raphael Recanati of Discount Bank and Mordechai Einhorn of Bank Leumi were both sentenced to 8-month prison terms. Recanati's sentence was suspended on appeal when one of five charges was quashed. As part of the settlement, the controlling interest in Discount Bank, as well as the other banks, was ceded to the government.

=== Bejski Commission ===
Following the scandal, in 1984, the State Comptroller issued a report on the crisis, causing the Knesset State Review Committee to decide on January 7, 1985, to establish a national commission of inquiry. The commission was headed by Judge Moshe Bejski. The commission presented its findings on April 16, 1986.

The Bejski Commission came to the conclusion that the October 1983 crisis was a direct result of the stock adjustment. The commission pointed to four criminal offenses allegedly committed during the adjustment: financing and giving loans for the purchase of bank stock by the banks themselves; fraud and deceit of the client to get them to purchase stocks; conditioning one service on another; and perjury before the commission.

The commission's report states the regulatory bodies acted negligently and irresponsibly, but there were no recommendations for actions against them. Following the commission's conclusions, and after a long struggle, the banks' managers were dismissed, but no criminal charges were brought against them initially, due to "lack of public interest", according to the State Attorney. In 1990 the Supreme Court decided to order a trial of the banks' managers, and the accountants who lied to the commission.

On the administrative side, the commission concluded that investment recommendations should be separated from ownership, that is, the provident funds and mutual funds should be separated from the banks. These recommendations were not implemented, due to pressure from the banks and the government's conflict of interests as the banks' owner at the time.

The government later sold some of the banks to private investors, selling Bank Hapoalim in 1996, and HaMizrachi in 1998. The government also sold a major part of its stock in Bank Leumi in 2005, and of Discount in 2006.

In the early years of the 21st century, some of the commission's recommendations were finally put into place. After all four banks were sold by the mid-2000s, the recommendations of the subsequent Bachar Committee, which reached the same conclusions regarding separating the banks' depository and investment banking/fund management operations as the Bejski commission, were finally carried out as well. It may be argued that the timing of the crisis may have also had some additional positive effect, as the implementation of the subsequent tough banking regulations and reforms, albeit somewhat belatedly, were put in place just in time to help Israeli banks avert many of the problems experienced by banks in many other western countries during the 2008 financial crisis – by limiting Israeli banks' exposure to risky activities. This helped ensure a stable domestic banking sector, which contributed significantly to the relative resilience of the Israeli economy in face of the late-2000s recession.

== See also ==
- 1985 Israel Economic Stabilization Plan
