= Bejski Commission =

The Bejski Commission (Hebrew: ועדת בייסקי) was a National Commission of Inquiry established by the Israeli government on January 7, 1985. Headed by the Supreme Court justice Moshe Bejski, its remit was to examine events surrounding the 1983 Tel Aviv stock market crash, which led to a financial crisis and the nationalization of most of Israel's major banks. It issued a report on April 16, 1986, which concluded that major Israeli banks had been rigging the price of bank shares over a long period and called for the dismissal or resignation of many of the heads of the Israeli banking system.

Moshe Mendlelbaum, then governor of the Bank of Israel, resigned; Ernst Jephet of Bank Leumi retired with a $5 million agreement; Rafael Recanti refused to resign as head of the Discount Bank, threatening to provoke a banking crisis by withdrawing deposits from the Bank of Israel.
