= Pepper (payment application) =

Israeli mobile payment application

- Other names: Hebrew: פפר
- Initial release: 2017; 8 years ago
- Website: www.pepper.co.il

Pepper (Hebrew: פפר) is an Israeli online banking service of Bank Leumi where all banking services are offered exclusively through a mobile app.

Pepper allows users to manage a bank account, take out loans, deposit funds into savings accounts and fixed deposits, and receive a checkbook and an international credit or debit card. Banking services in Pepper are provided over the phone during the day and via a 24/6 chat service. The service allows the opening of individual private accounts only, but there are plans to offer joint and business accounts in the future.

Similar to other digital banking services, Pepper offers each customer a personalized feed (in a format similar to social networks), displaying various consumer insights.

== History ==
Pepper was first launched in June 2017 by Bank Leumi as a "direct and independent bank". The primary target audience for Pepper is young people, aged 16 and above, due to their strong preference for digital banking solutions. Bank Leumi invested approximately 300 million NIS in the project. According to the fee schedule published on the Pepper website, no fees are charged—except in exceptional cases. "Pepper" operates as a branch of Bank Leumi, and in late 2018, its technological operations were spun off into a subsidiary of Bank Leumi.

The service also offered an additional app called "Pay" (formerly "Pepper Pay"), which allows customers from all banks to send and receive payments from their phone contacts, collect money in groups, and more. Today, "Pay" operates as a separate service.

In 2019, the "Pepper Invest" app was launched, designed exclusively for Pepper customers aged 18 and above. The application allows users to trade securities of U.S. companies and buy fractional shares starting at 50 NIS.

To open a Pepper account, applicants must complete a video call with a banker and submit identifying documents. Due to regulatory reasons, only Israeli residents who do not hold U.S. citizenship can open an account in Pepper. Except for young users (ages 16–18), who are only required to present an ID card, or other specific cases (subject to Bank Leumi's discretion), applicants must have an existing bank account and an active credit card to verify their credit history. After joining Pepper, customers receive a welcome package, including a credit card and checkbooks.

As of 2023, Pepper can only be accessed via the mobile app, and transactions cannot be performed through a web browser or a dedicated website.

== Criticism ==
Despite its innovative approach to digital banking, Pepper has faced criticism, particularly regarding customer service, account eligibility, technical issues, fees, and investment limitations. Users report difficulties in reaching human representatives, relying mainly on chat and phone support, with delays during peak hours. Additionally, Pepper restricts account openings to Israeli residents without U.S. citizenship, preventing many potential customers from joining. The app's reliance on mobile-only banking has led to complaints about login issues, transaction delays, and occasional technical failures, particularly during high-traffic periods.

Although marketed as a fee-free bank, Pepper charges fees in specific cases, such as currency conversions and international transactions, which some users find unclear. Pepper Invest has also faced criticism for offering only U.S. stocks, excluding bonds, ETFs, or mutual funds, limiting investment options.
