= Discount Bank Tower =

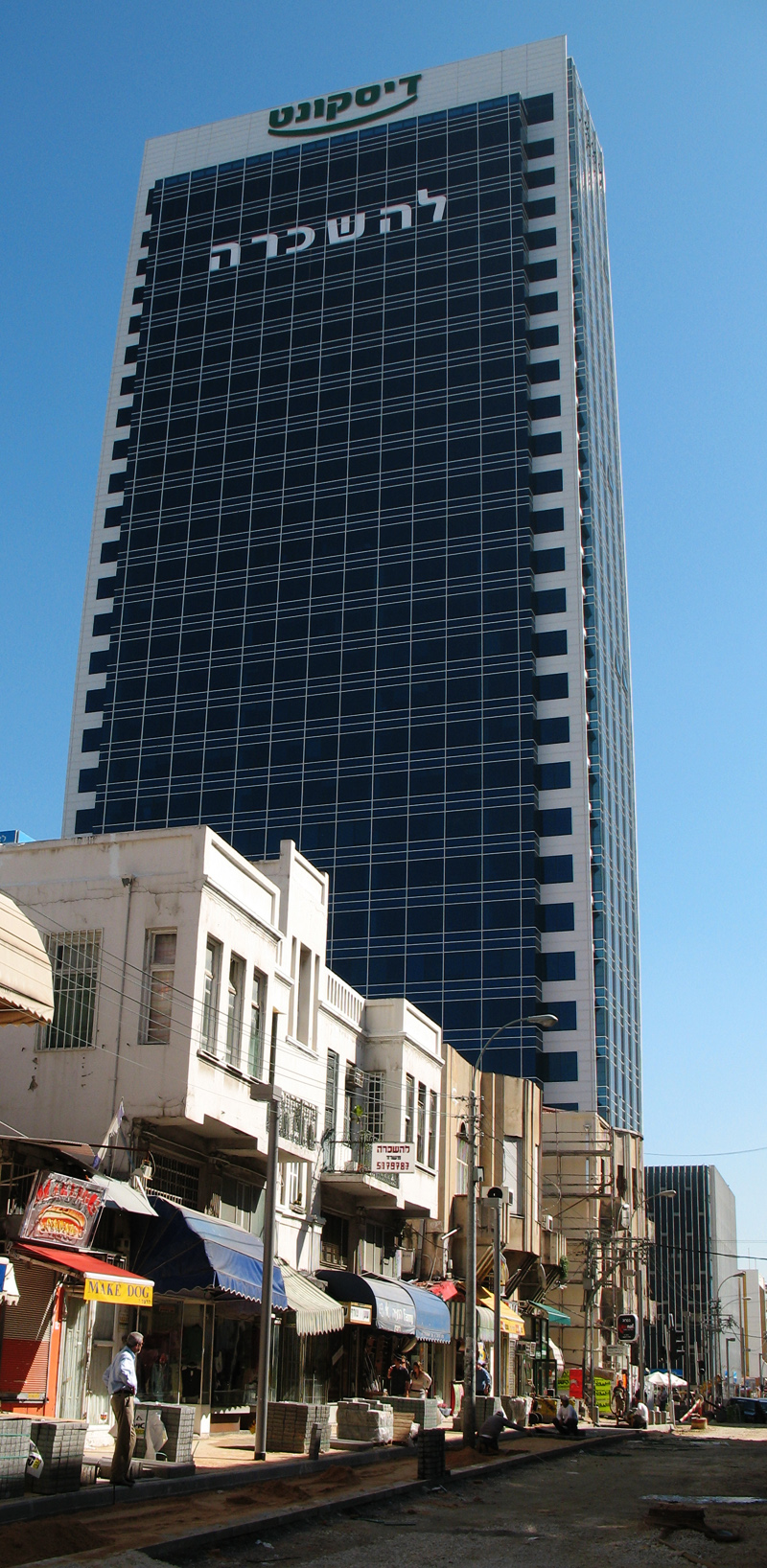
- Interactive map of the Discount Bank Tower area

General information
- Status: Completed
- Type: Offices
- Location: 23 Yehuda HaLevi Street, Tel Aviv, Israel
- Coordinates: 32°3′42.3″N 34°46′13.72″E
- Construction started: 2003
- Opening: 2006
- Cost: $50 million

Height
- Roof: 118 m (387 ft)

Technical details
- Floor count: 30
- Floor area: 22,000 m^{2} (240,000 sq ft)
- Lifts/elevators: 8

Design and construction
- Architect: Moore Yaski Sivan Architects
- Developer: Meshulam Levinstein Group
- Main contractor: Cementcal Engineering

The Discount Bank Tower is a skyscraper located on Yehuda HaLevi Street 23 corner with Herzl Street in Tel Aviv, Israel. Built between 2003 and 2006 and standing at 118 m (387 ft) tall with 30 floors, the tower currently serves as headquarters of the Discount Bank.

Completed in 2006, three years after construction began in 2003, the tower has 30 floors, 7 basement floors, and is 118 meters in height. Construction of the tower took place in two stages, with construction of the first 13 floors ending in 2006, and the upper 17 floors being constructed after the tower was partly occupied. It was inaugurated on August 23, 2006.

The Tel Aviv municipality granted a building permit on condition that the bank preserve the historic Schiff House next door, which was restored and reopened as a museum of banking.

== See also ==
- List of skyscrapers in Israel
- Architecture of Israel
- Economy of Israel
