= Bank Otsar Ha-Hayal =

Israeli military bank

- Native name: בנק אוצר החייל
- Company type: Public
- Industry: Banking
- Founded: 1946; 80 years ago
- Area served: Israel
- Revenue: ₪597 million (2014)
- Parent: First International Bank of Israel
- Website: www.bankotsar.co.il

Bank Otsar HaHayal (Hebrew: בנק אוצר החייל, lit. 'Soldier's Treasury Bank') is an Israeli bank. It is currently owned by The First International Bank of Israel.

== History ==
=== British Mandate era ===
Otsar HaHayal was founded in 1946 by the British mandatory authorities to provide banking services to Jewish veterans of the British armed forces. It later provided these services to Israel Defense Forces veterans and defense sector employees, who also became part owners of the bank.

=== State of Israel ===
In 1972, the bank opened up to the general public, although it still largely kept its association with military assets. It was purchased by Bank Hapoalim in 1977. By 1996, Otsar HaHayal completely transformed into a commercial public bank.

On January 24, 2006, Bank Hapoalim's share of the bank, 66%, was sold for 703 million NIS, approximately 185% of Otsar Ha-Hayal's estimated worth, to the First International Bank of Israel.

== Controversy ==
On 12 February 2020, the United Nations published a database of companies doing business related in the West Bank, including East Jerusalem, as well as in the Golan Heights. Bank Otsar Ha-Hayal was listed on the database on account of its activities in Israeli settlements in these territories.

== See also ==
- Economy of Israel
- Banking in Israel
