= Uri Levin =

Israeli banking executive

- אורי לוין
- Education: BS & MBA
- Alma mater: Tel Aviv University & London Business School
- Occupation: Businessman
- Years active: 1991–present
- Title: Chief executive officer (CEO), Discount Bank
- Term: December 2019–present
- Predecessor: Lilach Asher-Topilsky

Uri Levin (Hebrew: אורי לוין; born 1972), is the CEO of Discount Bank, one of Israel's leading banks. Levin is a trained pilot who served in the Israeli Air Force before building his career as a business executive.

== Military service ==
Levin attended the Israeli Air Force Flight Academy, where he studied aviation and trained to be a pilot. Upon graduation, he served as a cargo pilot in the Israeli Air Force.

== Education ==
After serving in the Israel Defense Forces, Levin pursued higher education. He received a Bachelor of Science from Tel Aviv University and a Master of Business Administration from the London Business School.

== Career ==
Upon completion of his studies, Levin began his business career as a business consultant in the London offices of McKinsey & Company, the global management consulting firm. In 2007, Levin was recruited by Bank Hapoalim CEO Zvi Ziv to serve as his chief of staff. It was at Bank Hapoalim where Levin would meet businesswoman Lilach Asher-Topilsky.

After a few years at Bank Hapoalim, Levin became the CEO of ISP Group, a Zürich, Switzerland-based financial services firm. In 2014, Asher-Topilsky was now CEO of Tel Aviv-based Discount Bank and offered Levin a senior position in strategic planning.

In May 2017, Levin was named president and CEO of IDB Bank, a New York-based private and commercial bank and a wholly owned subsidiary of Discount Bank.

In June 2019, Asher-Topilsky made a surprise announcement that she would step down from her role as Discount Bank CEO by year-end to join a private equity firm. Earlier in 2019, Bank Hapoalim CEO Arik Pinto had announced he would retire at the end of the year.

In summer 2019, Levin was invited to interview for CEO positions at both Discount Bank and Bank Hapoalim. Levin underwent a full day of interviews at Bank Hapoalim, only to withdraw his candidacy shortly thereafter and accept the CEO position at Discount Bank instead. He was officially named CEO of Discount Bank in July 2019. He formally exited IDB Bank upon the arrival of his successor, businessman Ziv Biron in December 2019, only to immediately begin duties as CEO of Discount Bank.

== See also ==
- Discount Bank

Business positions
Preceded by Lilach Asher-Topilsky	Discount Bank; 2019–present	Succeeded by Incumbent
