= Arab Israel Bank =

Bank in Israel established in 1961

- Native name: البنك العربي الإسرائيلي בנק ערבי ישראלי
- Type: Subsidiary
- Industry: Banking
- Founded: 1961; 65 years ago
- Headquarters: Israel
- Area served: Israel
- Services: Financial services
- Revenue: NIS 170.8 million
- Net income: NIS 49.2 million
- Parent: Bank Leumi
- Website: arabic.leumi.co.il (AR)

Arab Israel Bank (Ai Bank) (Hebrew: בנק ערבי ישראלי, Arabic: البنك العربي الإسرائيلي) is a bank in Israel established in 1961. It is owned by Bank Leumi and caters to the country's Arab population.

== History ==
In 1971, Bank Leumi acquired Arab Israel Bank (established 1960), which serves mainly the Arab citizens of Israel in the north of the country. Ai Bank has 35 branches located in Israel's northern and Triangle regions.

The bank is primarily focused on retail banking and has around 470 employees.

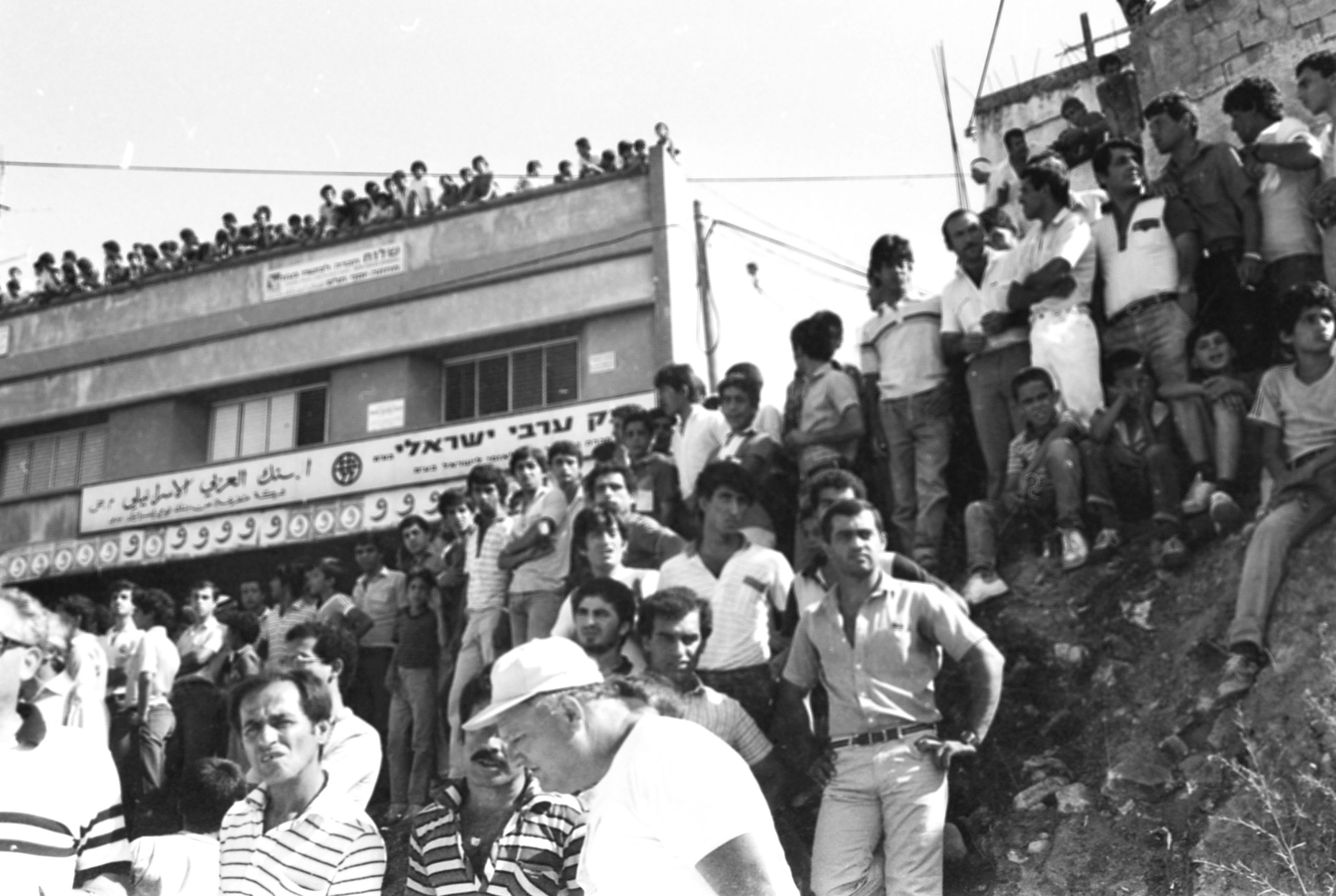
Demonstration in Umm al-Fahm in 1984. The Arab Israeli Bank branch is visible on the left.

In January 2016, the bank merged into Bank Leumi, and its branches became branches of Bank Leumi.

== See also ==
- Economy of Israel
- List of banks
- List of banks in Israel
