= Moshe Bejski =

Survivor of the Holocaust through Oskar Schindler's humanitarian actions (1921–2007)

- משה בייסקי
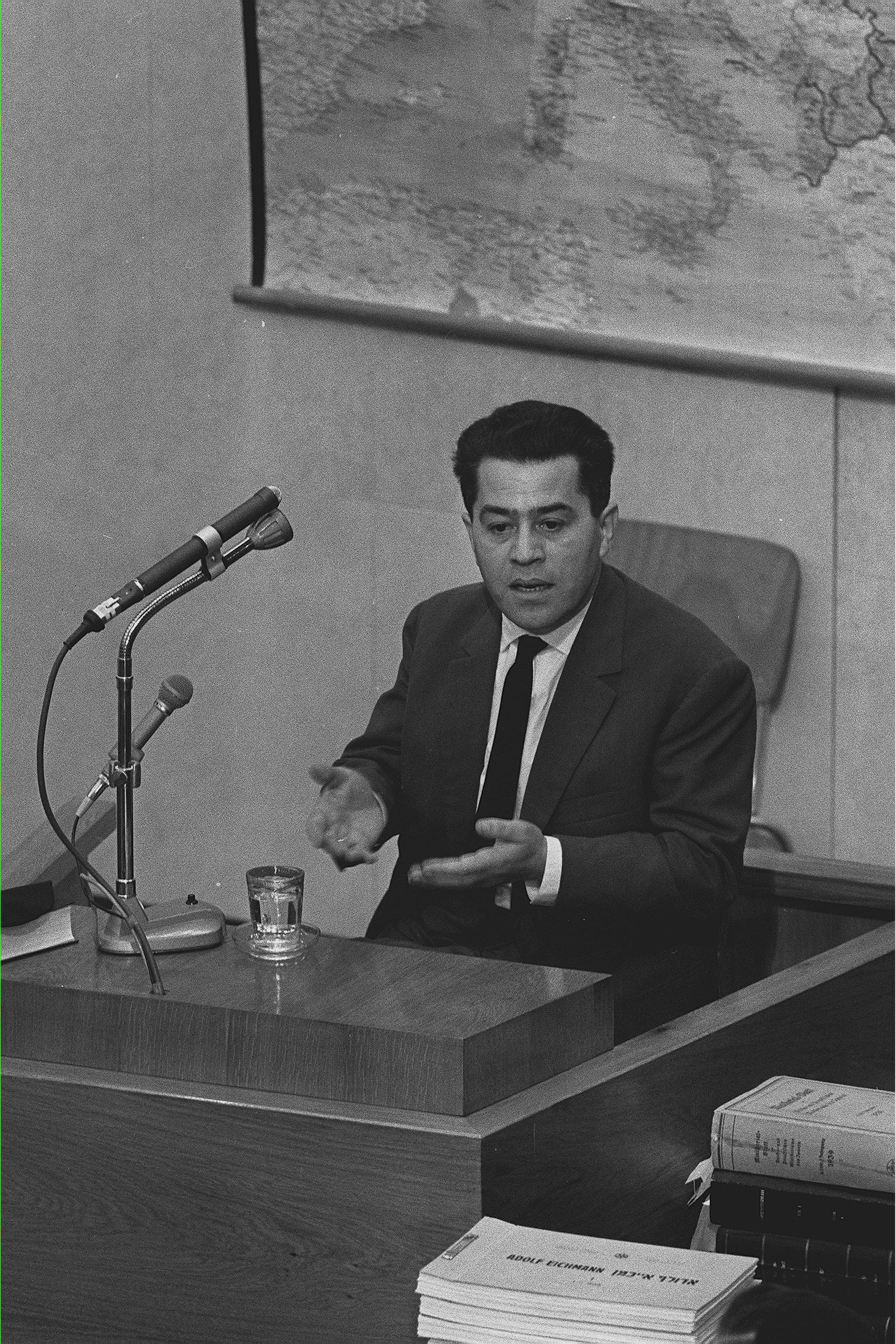
- Bejski testifying at Adolf Eichmann's trial in Jerusalem, 1961

Justice of the Supreme Court of Israel
- In office 1979 – 1991

Personal details
- Born: 29 December 1921 Działoszyce, Kielce Voivodeship, Poland
- Died: 6 March 2007 (aged 85) Tel Aviv, Israel
- Occupation: Lawyer; judge; professor; magistrate

Moshe Bejski (Hebrew: משה בייסקי; 29 December 1921 – 6 March 2007) was a Polish-born Israeli Supreme Court Justice and President of Yad Vashem's Righteous Among the Nations Commission. After surviving the Holocaust with the help of Oskar Schindler, Bejski immigrated to Israel. In 1961, he testified about his experiences during the Holocaust during the trial of Adolf Eichmann. He served on the Tel Aviv-Yafo district court from 1968 to 1979 and was appointed to the Supreme Court of Israel, where he served from 1979 to 1991. As President of the Righteous Commission from 1975 to 1991, Bejski helped honor thousands of Holocaust rescuers. He also headed the Bejski Commission in the aftermath of the 1983 Israel bank stock crisis, which led to the nationalization of most of Israel's major banks.

== Life ==
=== Childhood in Poland ===
Moshe Bejski was born in the village of Działoszyce, near Kraków, Poland, on 29 December 1921. During his youth, he joined a Zionist organization that organized the move of young Polish Jews to Mandatory Palestine to build a new nation in the Jewish "promised land". However, he was not able to leave for Palestine with his family before the invasion of Poland in 1939 due to health issues.

=== The Holocaust ===
The German occupation of Kraków began on 6 September 1939. The area's Jews were murdered or required to live in the Kraków Ghetto. Bejski's parents and sister were shot soon after they were separated. In 1942, Bejski, along with his brothers Uri and Dov, ended up in the forced labor camp (Note: Płaszów would later be converted from a labor camp to an official concentration camp.) of Płaszów.

On paper, the brothers were listed as a machine fitter and a draftsman, but Uri had expertise in weapons and Moshe had become a skilled document-forger. Throughout the war, Moshe Bejski helped forge papers and passports that other inmates and Schindler used to smuggle resources to the Jews or to smuggle Jews out of danger.

He and his brothers eventually got placed on the famous list for Oskar Schindler's factory in occupied Czechoslovakia, where they spent the remainder of the war in relative safety. He was worker number 531 on Schindler's list. They were liberated by the Red Army in May 1945. When the brothers discovered the fate of their parents and sister, they decided to emigrate to Israel.

=== New life in Israel ===
Bejski was able to begin a new life in the place of his dreams that he hadn't been able to reach when he was a boy, but his Zionist dream soon clashed with reality. His brother Uri was killed by an Arab sniper on the day the Jewish State was recognized by the UN. He served in the Israel Defense Forces during the 1948 Arab-Israeli War, reaching the rank of captain. In 1949, he was sent to France to manage the Youth Aliyah department in Europe and North Africa until 1952. Although he had originally dreamed of becoming an engineer, Bejski completed his law degree at the Sorbonne in 1951 and was awarded a doctorate in law for a thesis on human rights in the Bible. After returning to Israel, he was certified as a lawyer in 1953 and became one of the most reputable lawyers in Tel Aviv. He was appointed a magistrate judge in 1960, a district judge of Tel Aviv-Yafo from 1968 to 1979, and a judge on the Supreme Court of Israel for 12 years, from 1979 until 1991. He also taught legal courses the Hebrew University of Jerusalem and Tel-Aviv University from 1960 through 1969.

=== The Eichmann Trial ===
Moshe Bejski left his past in Poland behind him. For years no one knew of his history; he was commonly thought to be a Zionist who came to Palestine before the Nazi persecution or even a native born Israeli. He only willingly revealed his story and origins in 1961, during the trial of Holocaust architect Adolf Eichmann. He was called on by the state's lead prosecutor, Gideon Hausner to testify about the Płaszów concentration camp. Bejski delivered an emotional account of the circumstances at the camp and he conveyed the many crimes committed there to the court.

For the first time in Israel, the deep unease of the European refugees who survived to the Holocaust was revealed. There were those who were unable to integrate themselves and be accepted by a populace who despised them and accused them of cowardice and lack of rebellion against the Nazis. A debate opened around the world, also stirred by the polemic contribution of Hannah Arendt, a German philosopher of Jewish descent who escaped to America in the 1930s. The hardships connected to the history of the Jews during World War II was divulged.

=== President of the Righteous Commission ===
The Yad Vashem Memorial was established in Jerusalem for eternal remembrance and acknowledgment of the Holocaust victims. In 1953, the State of Israel committed itself to bestowing an honor to gentiles who had saved Jewish lives. They were awarded the title of Righteous among the Nations.

The Righteous Commission was established and given the task of running investigations to discover the acts of rescue and to find who the title must be awarded to. The most well-known judge in Israel at the time, Moshe Landau, who had presided over the Eichmann trial and issued the death verdict, was appointed president. Landau soon left the position and proposed that the nomination be given to Bejski. Bejski replaced him in 1970 and kept the presidency until 1995 when he retired. In that time nearly eighteen thousand Righteous had been honored and had been able to plant a tree in the avenue dedicated to remembering them and their gestures at Yad Vashem.

Bejski committed to helping other Righteous people besides Schindler. He fought to obtain the Israeli government's commitment to financially help those who lived precariously, many in Eastern Europe, and to also help those who needed medical assistance.

=== Bejski Commission ===
In the aftermath of the 1983 Israel bank stock crisis, the Bejski Commission was formed, with Moshe Bejski as chairman. It led to the nationalization of most of Israel's major banks. Its report, issued on 16 April 1986, concluded that major Israeli banks had been rigging the price of bank shares over a long period and called for the dismissal or resignation of many of the heads of the Israeli banking system. 16 of Israel's top banking and government finance officials were censured, resigned or were otherwise punished for their actions.

=== Death and legacy ===
Bejski died in Tel Aviv, Israel, on 6 March 2007, at age 85.

Bejski is referred to several times in the books by Holocaust survivors, including Night by Elie Wiesel. His response to the philosophical question posed in Holocaust memoir The Sunflower: On the Possibilities and Limits of Forgiveness by Simon Wiesenthal is featured in current editions of the book.
