= Bank Yahav =

Israeli bank

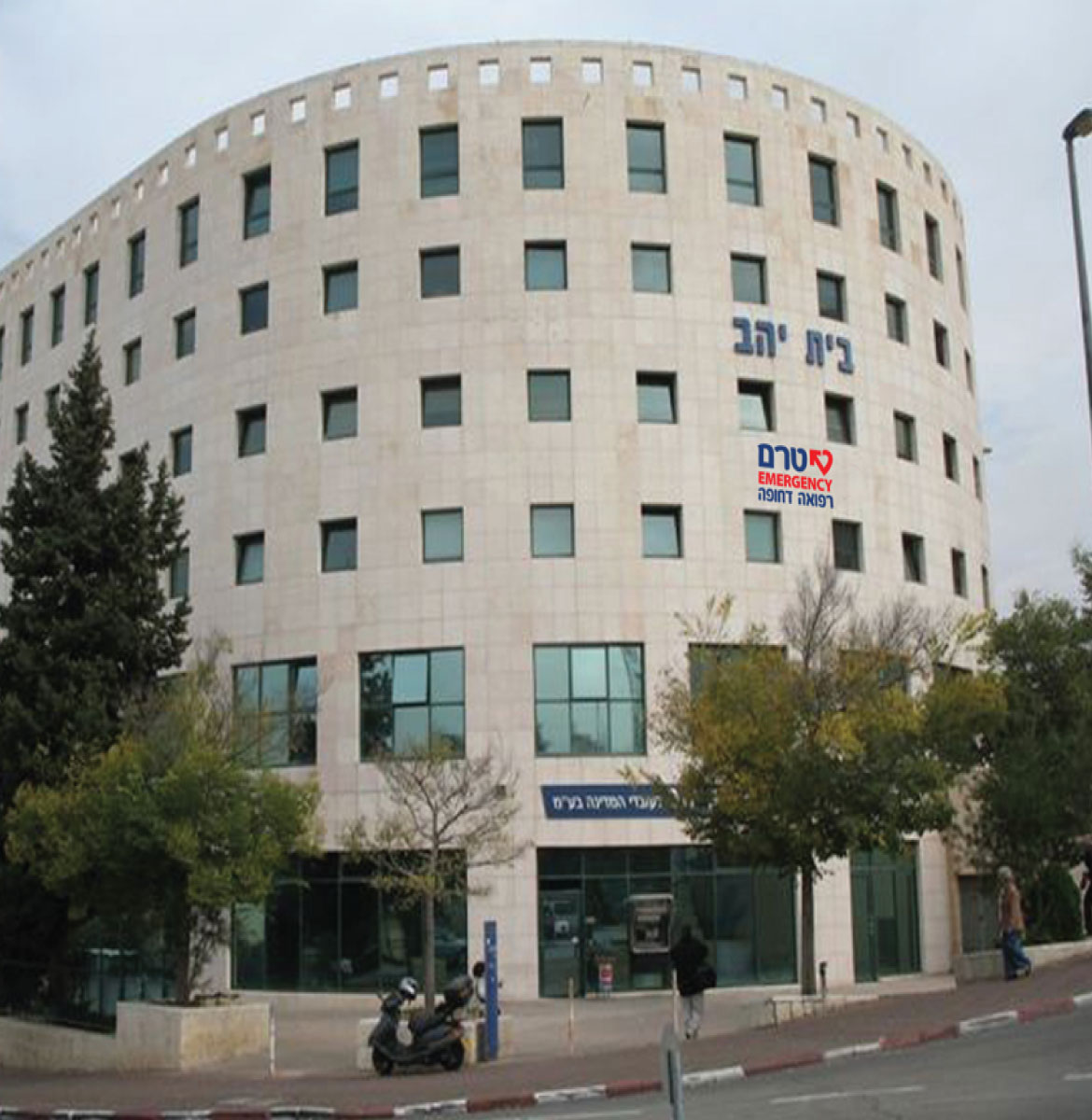
- Headquarters in Jerusalem in 2012
- Native name: בנק יהב
- Website: www.bank-yahav.co.il

Bank Yahav For Government Employees Ltd (Hebrew: בנק יהב לעובדי המדינה בע"מ) is an Israeli bank. It is jointly controlled by Bank Mizrahi-Tefahot and the Company for Economy and Culture Projects for State Employees.

== History ==
Bank Yahav was founded in 1954.

Bank Mizrahi-Tefahot purchased its 50% share from Bank Hapoalim in 2008.
