= Bank Massad =

Israeli bank

- Native name: בנק מסד
- Formerly: Massad Mutual Loans and Savings Company (until 1977)
- Company type: Public
- Industry: Banking
- Founded: 1929; 97 years ago
- Headquarters: Ramat Gan, Israel
- Area served: Israel
- Key people: Gabriel Teitel (CEO)
- Parent: First International Bank of Israel
- Website: www.bankmassad.co.il (in Hebrew)

Bank Massad (Hebrew: בנק מסד) is an Israeli bank with 21 branches and branches throughout Israel.

== History ==
Bank Massad was founded in 1929 as the Massad Mutual Loans and Savings Company (Hebrew: מסד חברה הדדית להלוואות וחסכונות בע"מ) by Histadrut HaMorim (Israel's teachers' trade union). Today it is a subsidiary of First International Bank (51%), jointly owned with Histadrut HaMorim.

Following the death of the CEO of the Bank in 1977 and suspicions regarding irregularities in the bank, concerns about its stability arose. Bank Hapoalim agreed to a lightning transaction to guarantee all of Masad's commitments, and later acquired a controlling stake in the institution as part of a strategy to acquire smaller banks, leading to the establishment of the new Masad Bank. The portion not sold to Bank Hapoalim was transferred to the ownership of "Masad Holdings" company, and members of the original institution became shareholders in the new company.

In 2008, the International Bank of Israel acquired the shares of Bank Hapoalim, as a result of Hapoalim Bank's entry into the financial advisory sector. That same year, the bank received approval to become a member of the stock exchange.

== Building ==
The bank's administration building used to be located on Rothschild Boulevard 80, on the site of the Israeli Theater building, before moving to Ramat Gan. The new administrative offices are situated in the stock exchange complex in Ramat Gan at 12 Abba Hillel Street.

== See also ==
- Economy of Israel
- Banking in Israel
