= IDB Bank =

American multinational private bank

- Type: Privately held company
- ISIN: US4650744091
- Industry: Banking
- Founded: 1949; 77 years ago
- Headquarters: 1114 Avenue of the Americas, New York, New York, U.S.
- Area served: United States, Latin America & Israel
- Key people: Avner Mendelson (President & CEO)
- Products: Private banking Commercial banking Asset management Investment management
- Total assets: US$14.39 billion (June 2026)
- Parent: Discount Bank
- Subsidiaries: IDB Capital
- Rating: Standard & Poor's: BBB+ Kroll Bond Rating Agency: A−
- Website: www.idbny.com

IDB Bank (IDB) is an American multinational private bank, commercial bank and financial services company headquartered in New York City with locations in the United States, Latin America and Israel. It is chartered by the State of New York and a member of the Federal Deposit Insurance Corporation.

== History ==
What is known today as IDB Bank first began in 1949 as a single representative office in New York City for Tel Aviv-based Discount Bank. The office had just a few employees and limited contact with the public.

In 1961, New York State law changed to allow foreign banks to operate full branches. IDB immediately began work on opening a full-service branch of its own. On April 4, 1962, former First Lady of the United States Eleanor Roosevelt officiated the opening of IDB's first-ever branch at 511 Fifth Avenue in Midtown, Manhattan.

In 1968, IDB acquired HIAS Immigrant Bank, a New York State licensed bank located at 425 Lafayette Street in the East Village neighborhood of Manhattan. Established in 1923 as a service of the Hebrew Immigrant Aid Society, HIAS Immigrant Bank's sole purpose was to facilitate remittance or money transfers to and from immigrants’ families abroad, which was then a service not offered by most U.S. banks. IDB announced it would operate the acquisition as Israel Discount Trust Company, a member of the Federal Deposit Insurance Corporation.

By 1980, IDB became a wholly owned subsidiary of Discount Bank as "Israel Discount Bank of New York" and later purchased the registered service mark "IDB Bank" to reflect its expansion into markets outside of New York and describe its service as a "bank".

== Headquarters & Locations ==
IDB's headquarters are located in the W. R. Grace Building.

Outside of New York, IDB has physical locations in New Jersey, Florida and California, as well as Chile, Uruguay and Israel.

== See also ==
- Uri Levin
