= Union Bank of Israel =

Israeli bank

Union Bank of Israel, Ltd.

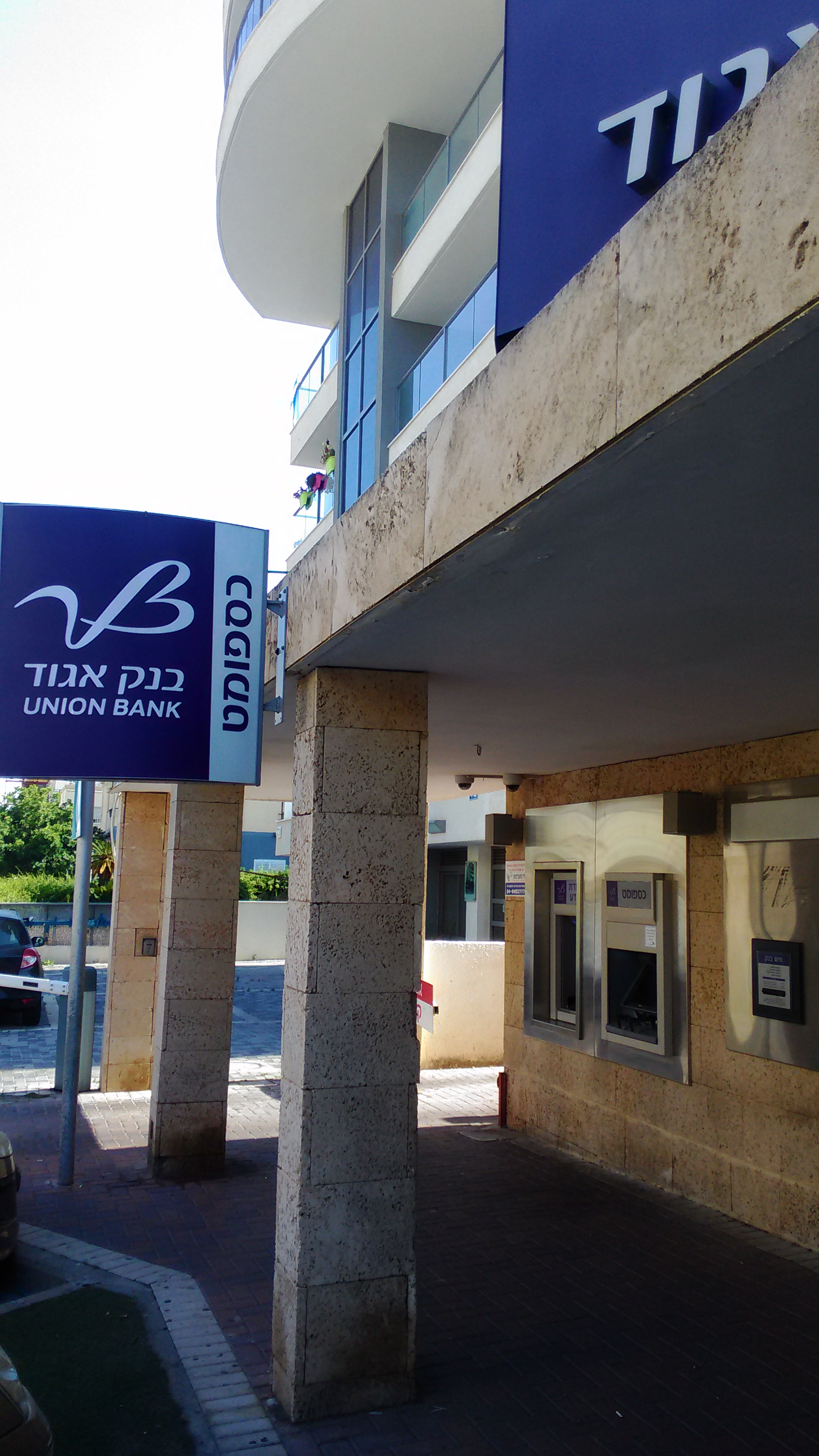
- Company type: Public
- Industry: Banking
- Founded: 1951; 75 years ago
- Headquarters: Tel Aviv, Israel
- Net income: ▲ ₪225 million (2015)
- Total equity: ₪40.8 billion (2014)
- Number of employees: 5,173
- Website: www.unionbank.co.il

The Union Bank of Israel, Ltd. (Hebrew: בנק אגוד לישראל); TASE: UNON), more widely known by its Hebrew name, Bank Igud, was the seventh largest Israeli bank, with thirty branches spread around the country.

In September 2020, Bank Mizrahi-Tefahot acquired all the shares of Bank Igud, therefore legally as of October 1, 2020, Igud Bank ceased to exist as a publicly traded company and became a subsidiary of Bank Mizrahi-Tefahot. Mizrahi appointed 4 directors to the bank's board, and also appointed Moshe Levi as chairman of the board in place of Zeev Aviel. By November 15, 2022, all Igud Bank customers were transferred to Mizrahi-Tefahot. On 31 December, 2022, the merger process was completed entirely, and "Igud" ceased to exist as an entity.

== History ==
Bank Igud was founded in 1951 by the Economic Company for Israel from New York and the Palestine Association from London. This continued the banking operations of the Palestine Association, which had been active in the Land of Israel since 1922. In April 1954, Bank Leumi acquired most of the shares of the Palestine Association, resulting in Bank Igud becoming jointly owned by Bank Leumi and the Economic Company. In March 1958, a merger with Feuchtwanger Bank was proposed, but negotiations failed, and the merger did not proceed. In 1961, Bank Leumi purchased the remaining shares, gaining full ownership of Bank Igud.

In 2014, Bank Igud held a market share of about 3% of the banking system in Israel, focusing on commercial activity for high-income earners.

A unique sector the bank operated in was the diamond sector. When the Diamond Exchange was established, diamond trading also took place in the building where the bank's offices were located in Tel Aviv, thus establishing a connection between this sector and the bank. The bank's market share in the diamond sector stood at about 22%, significantly higher than its relative share in the general banking market. As part of the merger process with Mizrahi Bank, the bank's credit portfolio in the diamond sector was sold to the company "Peninsula".

== See also ==
List of banks in Israel
