= Banking in Israel =

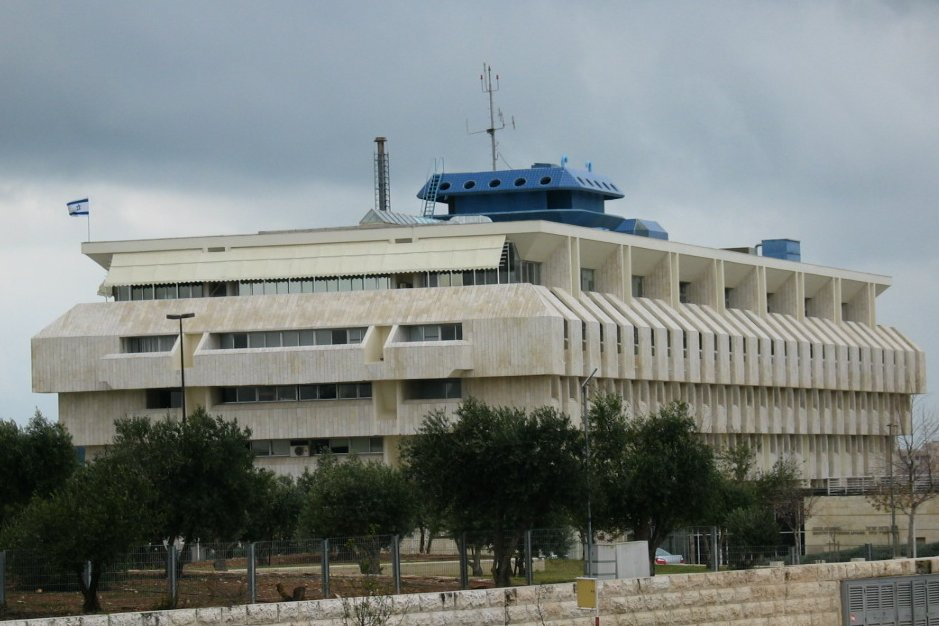
Bank of Israel

Banking in Israel has its roots in the Zionist movement at the beginning of the 20th century prior to the establishment of the State of Israel in 1948.

== History ==
The World Zionist Organization established the Anglo-Palestine Bank in 1903 (which was later renamed as Bank Leumi). The two largest banks control over 60% of banking activity, and the top five control over 90%.

Most of the banks were nationalized when their stocks collapsed in the 1983 bank stock crisis. Since then, the government has sold much of its bank stock holdings but still remains a large stockholder in many of the now privately held banks. The government sold Bank Hapoalim in 1996 and Bank Mizrahi (now merged into Bank Mizrahi-Tefahot) in 1998. The government also sold a major part of its stock in Discount Bank in 2006 and in Leumi Bank in 2005.

== Banks ==
As of 2022, there are ten commercial banks, four foreign banks, and a joint service company for clearing, all of which are supervised by the Banking Supervision Unit of the Bank of Israel.

Five main groups dominate most of the banking operations in the country. The largest among them is Bank Leumi, founded in London in 1902 in accordance with Theodor Herzl's vision and initially intended to serve as an economic arm for the young Zionist movement. Initially named as Anglo-Palestine Bank, however, it was later renamed Bank Leumi and served the state as a quasi-central bank at its inception. Despite continuous attempts by the state to privatize or at least sell a controlling stake, such efforts failed, leading to plans for its privatization through public stock offerings.

Bank Hapoalim, the second oldest bank in the country was founded in 1921 by the central institutions of the Jewish Yishuv at that time - the Zionist Organization and the General Federation of Jewish Workers in Palestine. Over the years, the bank has developed a network of branches and commercial banking activities across all banking sectors, providing a wide range of banking and financial services in Israel and beyond.

The third largest bank in Israel is Mizrahi Tefahot Bank, founded in 1923 by the Mizrahi movement and currently controlled by the Ofer-Wertheim group. In addition, the bank holds a 50% stake in Bank Yahav. In 2022, it merged with the activity of Agudath Bank, acquiring 100% of the bank's shares.

Fourth oldest bank in Israel is Discount Bank established on 5 April 1935, as Eretz Yisrael Discount Bank Ltd., by Leon Recanati and his partners, Yosef Albo and Moshe Carasso. The bank survived the difficult years of World War II and became a large and leading bank after the establishment of the state. The bank has faced difficulties due to wrong business decisions and strained labor relations between management and the workers' committee, but it has recovered from them. The bank also controls Discount Mercantile Bank and is owned by the Canadian-Israeli Bronfman family.

Of the major bank the fifth is Bank International, controlled by a group led by businessman Zadik Bino. It also owns Bank Massad.

In addition to the five major groups, there are two more commercial banks operating in Israel that provide services to private and business customers: Jerusalem Bank, Bank Yahav, and the digital bank ONE ZERO, which began operating in 2022. In December 2022, the Bank of Israel approved the establishment of another new bank, "Bank Ash Israel."

Foreign banks with branches in Israel include Citibank N.A., HSBC, BNP Paribas, Deutsche Bank, Credit Suisse, and State Bank of India. Foreign banks that have closed their operations in Israel include Barclays.

There is also Postal Bank (Bank Ha-Doar) which maintains current accounts with the basic services, but cannot provide credit activities in any way. The Postal Bank is supervised by Ministry of Communications under the Postal Law.

=== Major banks ===
Banking group	Established	Number of Branches	Total Assets (NIS million)	Share of total banking system assets	Share of total banking system credit	Share of total banking system deposits	Equity (NIS million)
Bank Leumi group	1902	193	699,166	26.5	29.3	29.18	49,443
Hapoalim group	1921	233	665,353	26.8	27.9	27.9	46,503
Discount Bank group	1935	178	376,754	16.6	15.8	15.31	25,478
Mizrahi-Tefahot Bank group	1923	198	428,292	21.1	18.0	18.05	24,868
First International Bank group	1975	103	195,955	8.0	8.2	8.81	11,035
Bank of Jerusalem	1963	23	18,907	1.0	0.8	0.75	1,256
Source: Annual survey 2022 Bank of Israel

== Supervision and regulation ==
The Bank of Israel supervises Israeli banks via the Supervisor of Banks. The tasks and authority of the Supervisor of Banks are based on several laws: Banks are subject of specific laws as corporations.

- The Banking Ordinance, 1941, a Mandatory ordinance which has been amended and updated over the years;
- The Banking (Licensing) Law, 1981;
- The Banking (Service to Customers) Law, 1981;
- The Checks Without Cover (bad checks) Law, 1981.
- The Regulation of Investment Advising, Investment Marketing, and Investment Portfolio Management Law.
