= Mercantile Discount Bank =

Commercial bank in Israel

Coordinates: 32°04′22.62″N 34°47′21.41″E

Mercantile Discount Bank Ltd.
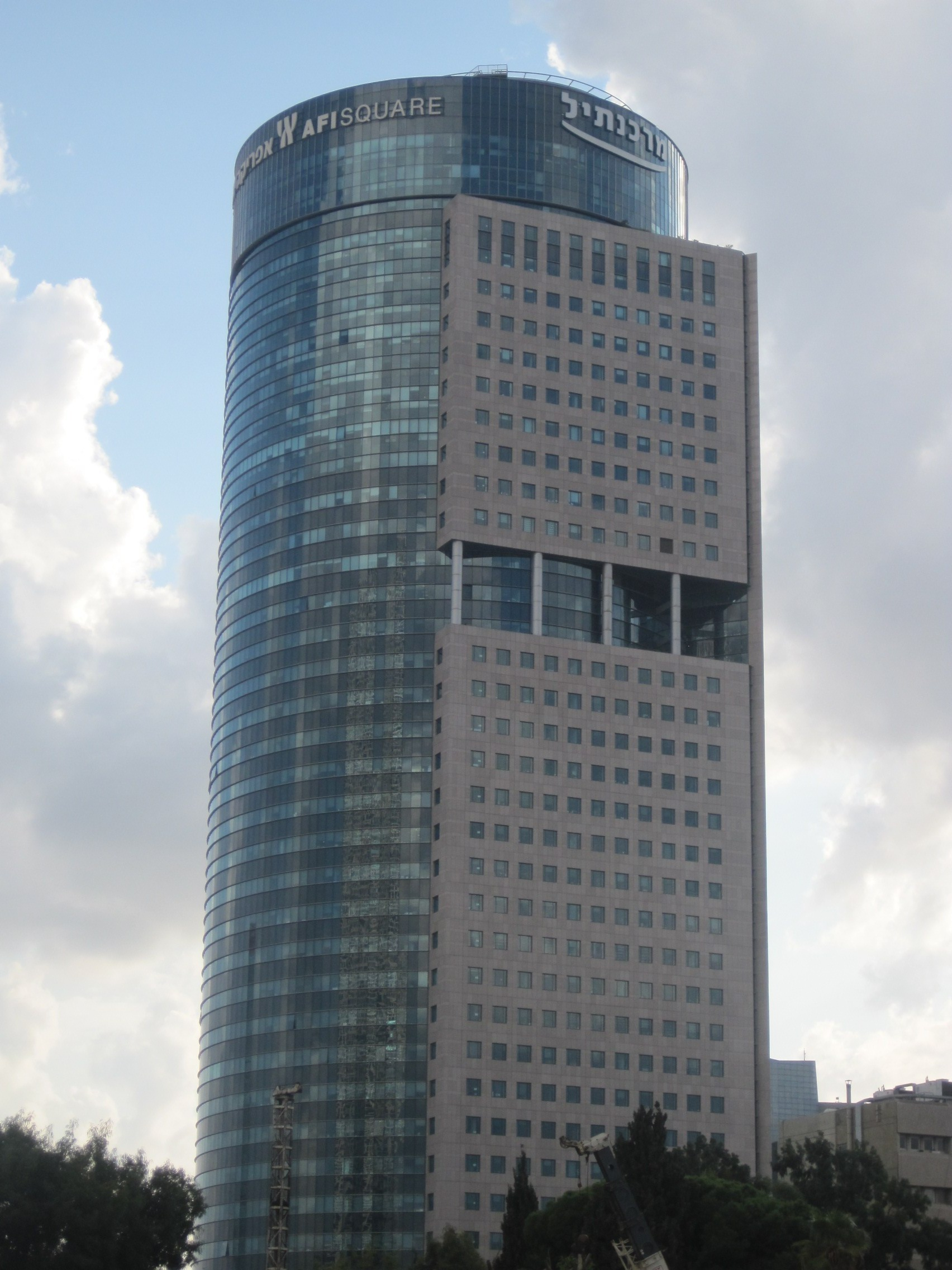
- Type: Public
- Traded as: TASE: DSCT
- Industry: Banking; Financial services
- Founded: 16 September 1924; 101 years ago (as Palestine Mercantile Bank)
- Headquarters: Tel Aviv, Israel
- Products: consumer banking, corporate banking, finance and insurance, investment banking, mortgage loans, private banking, private equity, savings, Securities, asset management, wealth management, Credit cards
- Parent: Israel Discount Bank
- Website: www.mercantile.co.il

Mercantile Discount Bank (Hebrew: בנק מרכנתיל דיסקונט בע"מ) is a major commercial bank in Israel and is a subsidiary of Israel Discount Bank. It is the sixth-largest bank in Israel.

== Controversies ==
=== Involvement in Israeli settlements ===
On 12 February 2020, the United Nations published a database of companies doing business related in the West Bank, including East Jerusalem, as well as in the occupied Golan Heights. Mercantile Discount Bank was listed on the database on account of its activities in Israeli settlements in these occupied territories, which are considered illegal under international law.

=== Tax fraud affair in Australia ===
In 2021, MDB and its parent company IDB reached a settlement of 343 million (A$137 million) with the Australian Taxation Office after allegedly conspiring with the Sydney-based Binetter family to engage in tax fraud.
