= Isracard =

Israeli Finance Company

Isracard LTD
- Industry: Financial services
- Founded: 1975; 51 years ago
- Headquarters: Bnei Brak, Israel
- Key people: Ron Vaxler, (CEO)
- Revenue: ▲ ₪1.58 billion (2010)
- Net income: ▲ ₪208 million (2010)
- Website: isracard.co.il

Isracard's logo until 2012

Isracard's logo until 2023

Isracard (Hebrew: ישראכרט) is an Israeli company that is made up of four different companies: Isracard LTD, Europay LTD, Aminit LTD and American Express Israel, which offers financial services – including credit card issuing, loans, credit services, and flexible payment options.

== History ==
Isracard was formed in 1975 by Bank Hapoalim, led by Yaakov Levinson, when it acquired Eurocard Israel (now Europay Israel LTD), the local franchisee of the European Eurocard cards which was established at 1972. In this way, Isracard marketed and operated cards for local use only under the private brand "Isracard", and "Eurocard" cards for use outside of Israel (Eurocard itself signed a cooperation agreement with Master Charge (later MasterCard) which enabled cards to be accepted in the US as well).

When its rival Israel Credit Cards started marketing and operating in 1978 both domestic and international cards under the international brand Visa, Isracard moved to combined domestic and international use cards, like Global Isracard (now MasterCard) and Isracard Gold (now Gold MasterCard), which operated in Israel as Isracard cards and beyond Israel as Eurocard cards. Later Isracard operated to Bank Hapoalim limited Visa cards and in small quantities – as a foreign card, in a weekly charge basis. The Visa card brand was managed by the subsidiary "Aminit" and included traveler's cheques. Later, Isracard would acquire full ownership of Aminit.

In preparation of the expected launch of another Visa franchisee, "Alpha Card", Isracard re-branded its cards in 1996, under the campaign "yes MasterCard", while combining its local cards and its international cards. Near that, In 1995, Isracard won the license to operate the prestigious American Express brand in Israel.

In 2001, its rivals, Cal and Leumi Card, started issuing MasterCard cards. In response, Visa cards' marketing was resumed, though still at a small scale and for mostly customers of Bank Hapoalim.

Until the opening of MasterCard and Visa vouchers clearing in 2007, the company continued in the combined cards model: Local Isracard cards were issued with a MasterCard logo as well. This model has allowed, among other things, to rake in higher clearing fees from businesses that cleared Isracard vouchers.

Under the competition, Isracard blurred out its local brand and started marketing more and more cards that were identified as MasterCard cards; Alternatively, it first began to issue local cards under an international brand – American Express (for Bank Hapoalim), since the company is still the only clearer of its vouchers, so it is still the largest credit card company in Israel and operates more voucher brands than any other of its competitors: Isracard (exclusively), MasterCard (which absorbed Eurocard in the global level in 2002), Visa and American Express. The company clears vouchers under these brands as well as the Japanese brand JCB's cards.

According to the company's policy, it does not clear gambling and pornographic sites.
