= First International Bank of Israel =

Israeli bank founded in 1970

First International Bank of Israel, Ltd.

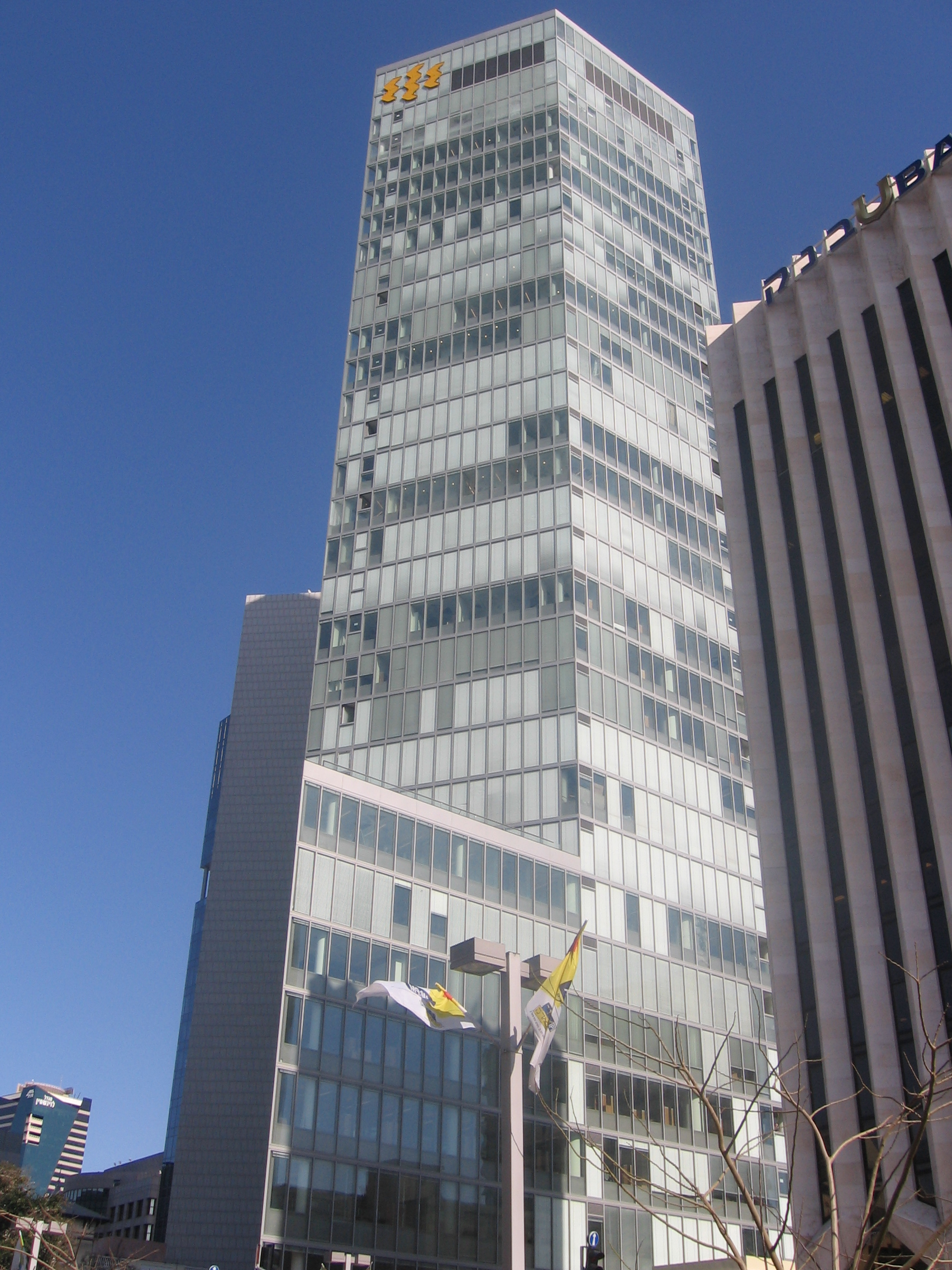
- First International Bank Tower in Tel Aviv
- Type: Public
- Industry: Banking
- Founded: 4 August 1970
- Headquarters: Tel Aviv, Israel
- Key people: Eli Cohen, CEO
- Net income: ▲ ₪577 million (2012)
- Total equity: ₪5787.0 million (2010)
- Number of employees: 5,173
- Parent: FIBI Holdings Ltd.
- Website: www.fibi.co.il

The First International Bank of Israel (Hebrew: הבנק הבינלאומי, romanized: HaBank HaBeinleumi) is an Israel-based bank. Its commercial base consists primarily of large corporate clients as well as end-market consumers.

The company is traded in the Tel Aviv Stock Exchange under the symbol "FIBI", and is part of the Tel Aviv 35 Index.

== History ==
First International Bank of Israel was founded in the early 1970s when then Israeli Finance Minister Pinchas Sapir approved the merger of several smaller banks into the former.

Edmond Safra (through his distant cousin Jacques Nasser) acquired control of FIBI in the 1980s. After Safra's death, the Safra Group sold off its business interests in Israel. As of 2010, FIBI's largest current shareholder is the FIBI Holding Company Ltd, whose largest shareholder is the Bino-Liberman Group; in addition, the Israel Discount Bank holds a significant block of shares.

The bank opened branches in London in 1981, and in Zürich in 1984. In 2006 it acquired a 68% interest in Bank Otsar Ha-Hayal for NIS 702 million. It is notable for being the only major bank in Israel which was not involved in the bank stock crisis in Israel in the early-1980s and as such was the only prominent bank in the country not nationalized as result of the crisis.

For a long time, FIBI was unique among Israeli banks in offering complete paperwork in English.

In 2015, Tungsten Corporation plc acquired FIBI's UK division for £30 million.

== Subsidiaries ==
- Bank Massad (51%) – jointly owned with Israel's teachers' trade union
- Bank Otsar Ha-Hayal
- U-Bank Israel – specializes in private banking
- Poaley Agudat Israel Bank (PAGI) – serving mainly the Jewish Orthodox community

== Controversy ==
On 12 February 2020, the United Nations published a database of 112 companies helping to further Israeli settlement activity in the West Bank, including East Jerusalem, as well as in the Golan Heights. These settlements are considered illegal under international law. First International Bank of Israel was listed on the database on account of its "provision of services and utilities supporting the maintenance and existence of settlements" and "banking and financial operations helping to develop, expand or maintain settlements and their activities" in these occupied territories.

On 5 July 2021, Norway's largest pension fund Kommunal Landspensjonskasse said it would divest from First International Bank of Israel together with 15 other business entities implicated in the UN report for their links to Israeli settlements in the occupied West Bank.

== See also ==
- Economy of Israel
