= Israel Discount Bank =

Israeli banking institution

Coordinates: 32°3′42.30″N 34°46′13.72″E

Israel Discount Bank, Ltd.

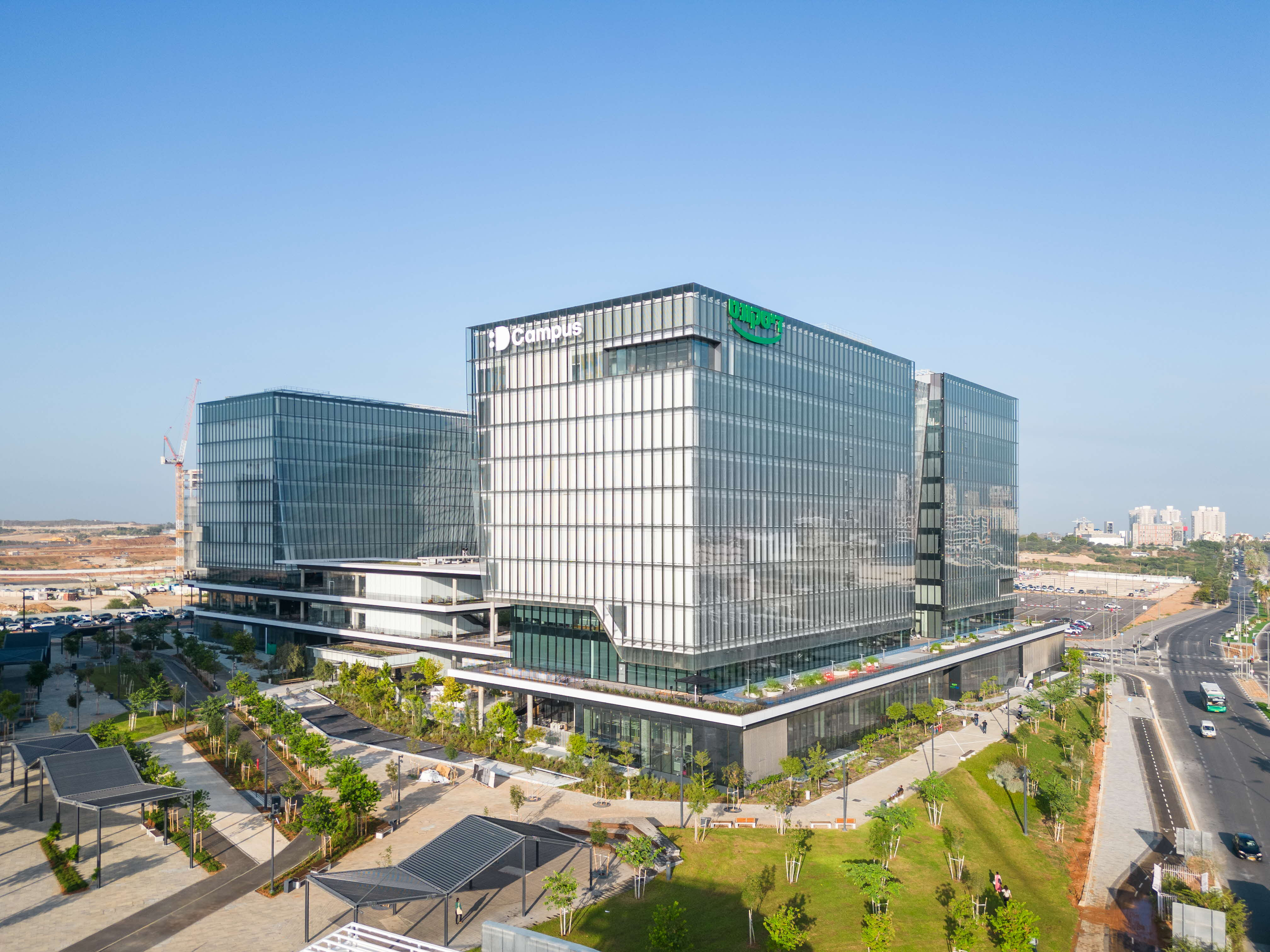
- Native name: בנק דיסקונט לישראל בע"מ
- Type: Public
- Traded as: TASE: DSCT
- Industry: Banking; Financial services
- Founded: Tel Aviv, Mandatory Palestine; 5 April 1935; 91 years ago
- Headquarters: Discount Bank Tower, Tel Aviv, Israel
- Key people: Dani Yamin (Chairman); Avraham Levi (CEO)
- Products: Credit cards, consumer banking, corporate banking, finance and insurance, investment banking, mortgage loans, private banking, private equity, savings, securities, asset management, wealth management
- Services: Financial services
- Revenue: ▲₪ 9.02 billion (2018)
- Operating income: ▲₪ 1.5 billion (2018)
- Total assets: ▲₪ 239.1 billion (2018)
- Total equity: ▲₪ 17.1 billion (2018)
- Website: www.discountbank.co.il

Israel Discount Bank, Ltd. (Hebrew: בנק דיסקונט לישראל) is an Israeli banking institution that offers a range of financial services, including retail banking, commercial banking, private banking, and financial services. The bank, headquartered in Tel Aviv, operates 112 branches throughout Israel.

Founded on 5 April 1935 in Tel Aviv, Mandatory Palestine, the bank has grown to become a significant player in the Israeli banking industry. It is a public company listed on the Tel Aviv Stock Exchange under the symbol DSCT and is included in the Tel Aviv 35 Index.

The bank's product portfolio includes credit cards, consumer banking, corporate banking, finance and insurance, investment banking, mortgage loans, private banking, private equity, savings, securities, asset management, and wealth management. It serves its customers through various channels including physical branches, online banking, and mobile banking.

As of 2025, the bank reported net income of ILS 4.14 billion and return on equity (ROE) of 12.6%. The current CEO is Avi Levi, with Danny Yamin serving as Chairman.

== History ==
=== British Mandate era ===
Discount Bank was established on 5 April 1935, as Eretz Yisrael Discount Bank Ltd., by Leon Recanati and his partners, Yosef Albo and Moshe Carasso. In its early days, Discount Bank operated out of a small hotel on Nachlat Binyamin Street in Tel Aviv. It later moved to its permanent location at 39 Yehuda Halevi Street. Today, Discount Bank's headquarters are located at the Discount Bank Tower, a 30-story skyscraper located at 23 Yehuda HaLevi Street in Tel Aviv, which completed construction in 2006.

Discount Bank derives its name from the word "disconto" - discount of bills. Discount Bank began its operations at a time of relative economic prosperity due to foreign capital that was brought into the country by members of the Fifth Aliyah in 1935, and grew significantly in its initial years of operation.

Economic growth declined with the outbreak of the Arab Revolt in 1936, and worsened even more after the outbreak of World War II. Despite the deterioration of the economy, Bank Discount profits rose due to its policy of granting loans on good terms in response to the legislation imposed by the British Mandate, which limited withdrawal of deposits. Alongside its financial activity, the bank contributed to the strength of the Yishuv through the establishment of Kadima, an organization that granted scholarships, opened an assistance center for the needy and, in conjunction with the Jewish Agency for Israel, helped establish agricultural settlements for immigrants from Arab countries.

In 1944, Discount Bank acquired the Haifa-based Mercantile Bank and several years later also acquired the local operations of the Ottoman Bank, Barclays Bank and Hollandsche Bank-Unie.

In 1945, Recanati died and management moved to his sons.

=== State of Israel ===
In the 1950s, Discount Bank opened additional branches in Europe. It began investing in Israeli companies through the Israeli Company for Financing and Investment, which it had acquired. In those years, thanks to the bank's accelerated opening of branches around Israel and extension of its opening hours to the afternoon, the bank grew to become the second largest bank in Israel. At the beginning of the 1960s, the bank expanded its activity both in Israel and overseas. In 1961, for the first time in the banking industry, the investment company, Discount Investments, was founded. What's more, the bank was awarded the right to issue Diners Club credit cards and was the first bank to offer its shares to the public. In 1964, the bank was awarded the Kaplan Prize for being the first bank to computerize its operations.

In the 1970s, the bank continued its momentum of growth and expansion, integration of advanced technologies and modern computer systems and improvement of customer service. In 1970, the bank acquired 50% of Barclays Bank and the name of the bank changed to Barclays-Discount. It later acquired full ownership. Additionally, Mercantile Bank was sold to Barclays-Discount Bank.

In 1974, the Discountomat, Israel's first ATM, was launched. In 1979, Visa Cal was founded in partnership with Bank Leumi.

In 1981, the bank's virtual branch, Discount Telebank, was established, making it the first banking call center in Israel and in the world. The same year, the bank also began operating its Bankonit - a mobile bank that operated for several years in the Lachish region. In 1983, "satellites" were opened for the first time in Israel, enabling customers to conduct banking transactions independently, outside of standard work hours. That same year, the bank - along with other banks - was nationalized by the Israeli government, due to the bank stock crisis.

Following the 1983 Israel bank stock crisis, the bank's ownership was transferred to the government of Israel.

In 1987, the Discount Group established the investment organization, Tachlit Investment House, which was engaged, among other things, in the sale of financial products, investment portfolio management and more.

In the first decade of the 21st century, activity centered around privatization of the bank and the sale of the government's holdings in it. In 2004, the process of privatizing the bank began, and this was completed in 2006, with the acquisition of 26% of the bank's shares by the Bronfman-Sharan Group. That same year, shares were also sold to Deutsche Bank. In 2010, the government sold the balance of its holdings in the bank.

In 2010, Mafteach Discount (Discount Key) was launched, offering benefits and discounts to credit cardholders, while combining an opportunity to makes small but regular deposits into a savings account with each purchase.

In 2012, the bank was forced to sell Tachlit ETNs to Dash Investment House, after the Supervisor of the Banks ordered it to sell its holdings in the company (20%) by 2013.

Uri Levin was named CEO of Discount Bank in July 2019 and served in this position until July 2023. The bank's current CEO is Avi Levi, who previously served as Senior Executive VP, Head of the Banking Division. Danny Yamin was appointed Chairman of the bank in November 2023.

== Digital banking and fintech ==
Discount Bank has gained media attention for its focus on digital banking and fintech partnerships. In 2017, Discount Bank signed agreements with several fintechs, including Icount and PayBox, to improve payment services and open banking abilities.

Of note, Discount Bank's creation of an artificial intelligence-driven digital assistant occurred through the successful partnership with Personetics Technologies. The AI, called Didi, was the first of its kind for Israel's banking industry.

In 2019, Discount Bank launched Business+, a mobile banking app for business banking customers that earned several awards, including the EMEA Gartner Eye on Innovation 2018, the 2017 and 2018 IT Awards by People and Computers.

== Subsidiaries ==
- Israel Credit Cards (CAL): Israel's leading issuer of credit cards, including Visa and MasterCard. Discount Bank has a 72% ownership stake.
- Discount Capital: As Discount Bank's investment banking arm, Discount Capital managed a ₪ 1.2 billion portfolio as of 2019. It invests directly in companies and business ventures, as well as in investment funds and mezzanine investments.
- Tafnit Discount Asset Management: Asset management of investment portfolios for private clients, private and public companies, non-profit organizations and government agencies.
- IDB Bank: an American multinational private bank, commercial bank and financial services company headquartered in New York City with locations in the United States, Latin America and Israel.
- Mercantile Discount Bank: A commercial bank that operates 80 branches in Israel, mainly in Israel's peripheral areas. It is fully owned by Discount Bank since 1993.

== Controversy ==
In 2021, IDB and its subsidiary Mercantile Discount Bank reached a settlement of ₪343 million (A$137 million) with the Australian Taxation Office (ATO), after allegedly conspiring with the Sydney-based Binetter family to engage in tax fraud. The banks reportedly allowed the family to route "back-to-back" loans through their accounts, "in effect lending their own money and paying interest to themselves", in exchange for a percentage of the balance. The family then fraudulently claimed the interest expense as a tax deduction, with a bank executive giving false sworn evidence that the transactions were at arm's length. The bank "made no admission of culpability in the settlement agreement" but stated it would appoint a former judge to conduct an independent inquiry into the matter.

== See also ==
- Banking in Israel
- Economy of Israel
