= Bank Mizrahi-Tefahot =

Israeli bank

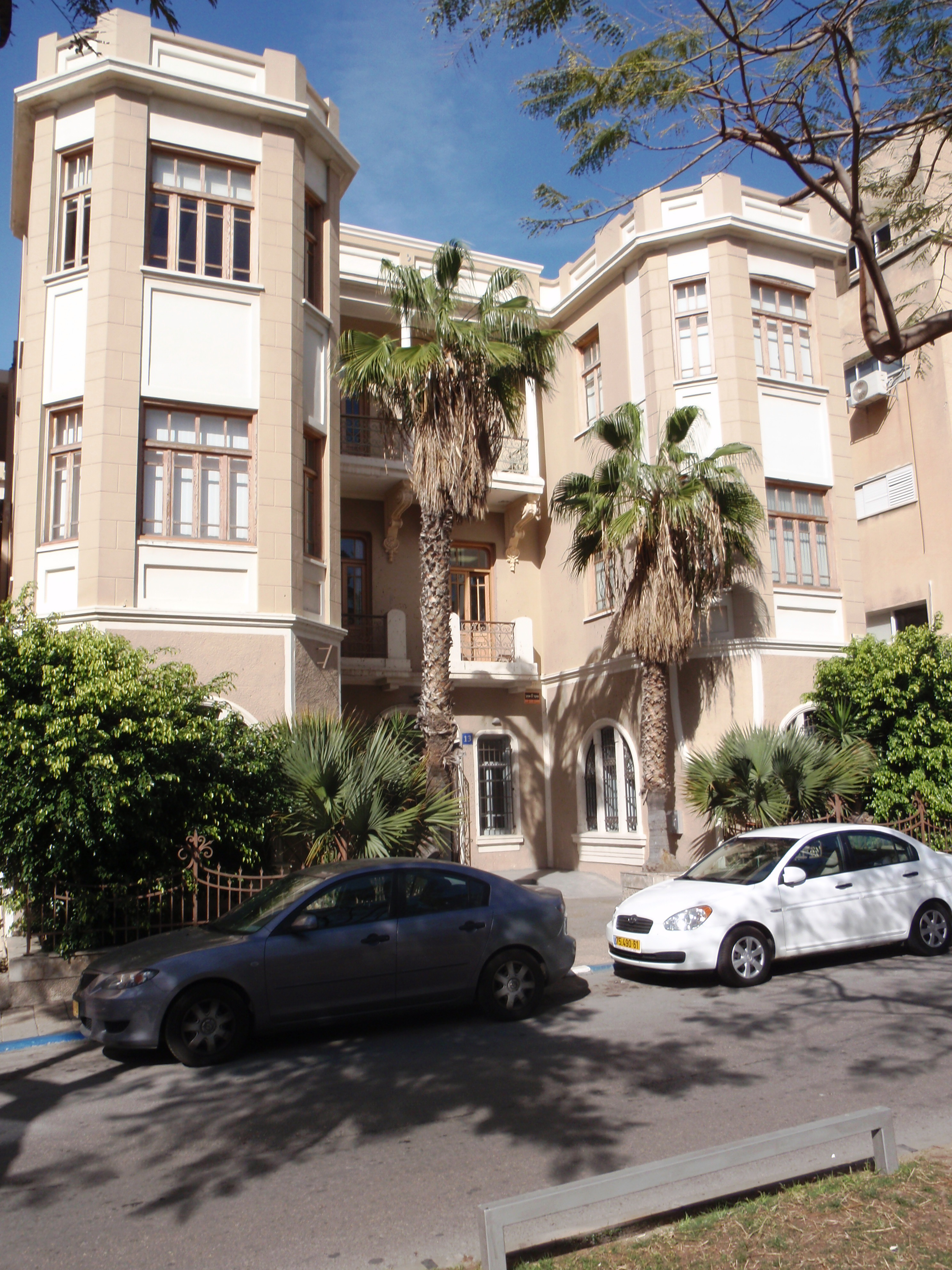
- Bank Mizrahi historical head office in Rothschild Boulevard, Tel Aviv
- Native name: בנק מזרחי טפחות
- Formerly: Bank Mizrahi
- Company type: Public
- Traded as: TASE: MZTF
- Industry: Banking
- Founded: 1923; 103 years ago
- Founder: Mizrachi movement
- Headquarters: Ramat Gan, Israel
- Area served: Israel
- Key people: As of 2022: Moshe Lary (President & CEO) Moshe Vidman (Chairman)
- Services: Financial services
- Revenue: ▲ ₪13.67 billion (2022)
- Net income: ▲ ₪4.47 billion (2022)
- Total assets: ▲ ₪428.292 billion (2022)
- Number of employees: 3,827 (2007)
- Website: www.mizrahi-tefahot.co.il

Bank Mizrahi-Tefahot (Hebrew: בנק מזרחי טפחות) is the third-largest bank in Israel. It has around 140 branches. The bank is the largest among Israel's mortgage lenders.

The CEO of Bank Mizrahi-Tefahot since September 2020 is Moshe Larry, who replaced Eldad Persher, the bank's CEO since 2014. The Chairman is Avraham (Avi) Zeldman, who replaced Moshe Vidman in June 2024.

During Larry's tenure, Bank Mizrahi purchased all the shares of Union Bank of Israel, which became its fully owned subsidiary.

== History ==
=== British Mandate era ===
The Mizrahi Bank was founded by the World Mizrahi Movement in 1923, with the aim of providing financial assistance and serving as a financial instrument for the enterprises of individuals and institutions belonging to the Mizrahi Organization.

In addition, the bank was entrusted with the mission of serving as a national public bank for the entire Jewish community in the Yishuv.

=== State of Israel ===
In 2004, in view of the transformations and changes that took place in the banking system, including the completion of the merger of several mortgage banks with their commercial banks, the idea of a merger within the Bank Mizrachi group became practical, and in June of that year, the board of directors of Bank Mizrachi decided to take action to merge Bank Tefahot with and into Bank Mizrachi.

In 2005, United Bank Mizrahi and Tefahot Mortgage Bank merged, and since then the bank has been called "Mizrahi-Tefahot Bank Ltd." or "Mizrahi-Tefahot".

Bank Mizrahi was established in 1923 by the Mizrachi movement and later merged with Bank Hapoel HaMizrachi to form Bank Mizrahi HaMeuhad (United Mizrachi Bank).

In November 2017, Mizrahi Tehafot Bank agreed to buy Union Bank of Israel for US$400 million, thereby consolidating its position as the third largest Israeli bank.

On 12 February 2020, Bank Mizrahi-Tefahot was listed on a database of 112 companies compiled by the United Nations implicated in helping to further Israeli settlement activity in the West Bank and Golan Heights, an activity considered illegal under international law.

On 5 July 2021, Norway's largest pension fund KLP said it would divest from Bank Mizrahi-Tefahot, alongside 15 other business entities implicated in the report, over the UN's fingering of what it asserted were "banking and financial operations helping to develop, expand or maintain settlements and their activities" in the occupied territories.

== Subsidiaries ==
- Etgar - Investment Portfolio Management has been managing investment portfolios since 1987.
- Mizrahi-Tefahot Trust Company - A trust company wholly owned and controlled by the bank, allowing for the integration of trust services with the bank's overall banking services.
- Tafachot Insurance Agency - provides mortgage insurance (life and structure insurance) to customers who take out mortgages through the bank.
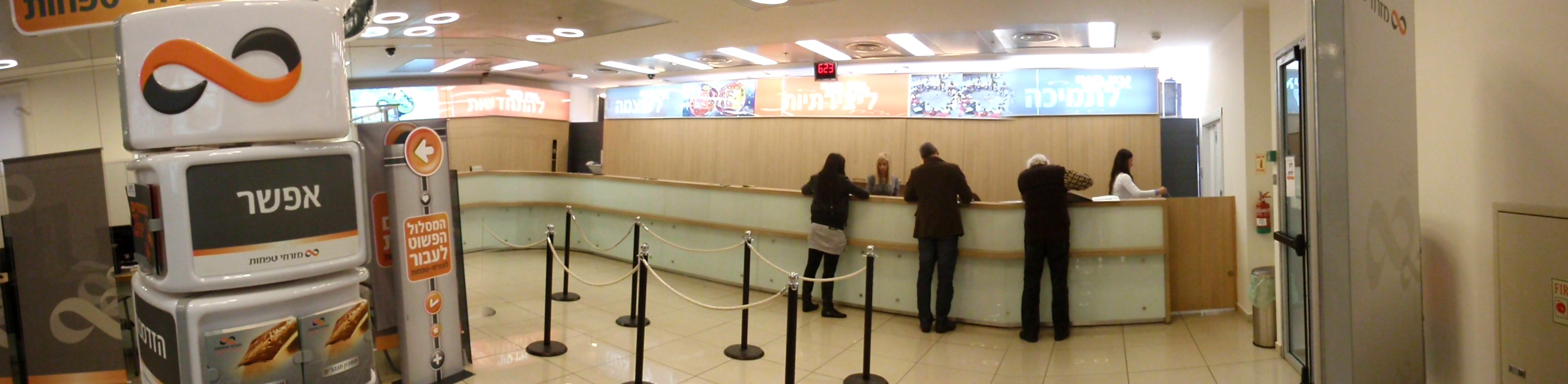

== See also ==
- Banking in Israel
- List of companies operating in West Bank settlements
