= Bank Leumi =

Israeli bank

- Native name: בנק לאומי
- Type: Public
- Traded as: TASE: LUMI
- Industry: Banking
- Founded: February 27, 1902; 124 years ago, Jaffa, Independent Sanjak of Jerusalem, Ottoman Empire
- Founder: Jewish Colonial Trust (Jüdische Kolonialbank) Limited, London, UK
- Headquarters: Tel Aviv, Israel
- Area served: Israel and 21 other countries
- Key people: Uri Alon, chairman Hanan Friedman, CEO
- Products: Asset management; Corporate banking; Credit cards; Finance and insurance; Investment banking; Mortgage loans; Private banking; Private equity; Consumer banking; Savings; Securities; Wealth management
- Services: Financial services
- Revenue: ▲US$ 3.9 billion (2016)
- Operating income: ▲₪2.83 billion (2015)
- Net income: ▲US$ 727.1 million (2016)
- Total assets: ▲US$ 113.96 billion (2016)
- Number of employees: ▲12,528 (2016)
- Subsidiaries: Arab Israel Bank
- Website: www.leumi.co.il

Bank Leumi (Hebrew: בנק לאומי, lit. National Bank; Arabic: بنك لئومي) is an Israeli bank. It was founded on February 27, 1902, in Jaffa as the Anglo-Palestine Company as subsidiary of the Jewish Colonial Trust (Jüdische Kolonialbank) Limited formed before in London by members of the Zionist movement to promote the industry, construction, agriculture, and infrastructure of the land hoped to ultimately become Israel. Today, Bank Leumi is Israel's largest bank (by total assets as of 2015), with overseas offices in Luxembourg, US, Switzerland, the UK, Mexico, Uruguay, Romania, Jersey, and China.

Though nationalized in 1981, now Bank Leumi is mainly in private hands, with the government as the largest single shareholder, with 14.8% of the stock, as of June 2006. The other major shareholders are Shlomo Eliyahu and Barnea Investments, which each hold 10% of the stock, constituting the control core of the bank. Sixty percent of the bank's stocks are held by the public and traded on the Tel Aviv Stock Exchange.

== History ==
=== Jewish Colonial Trust ===
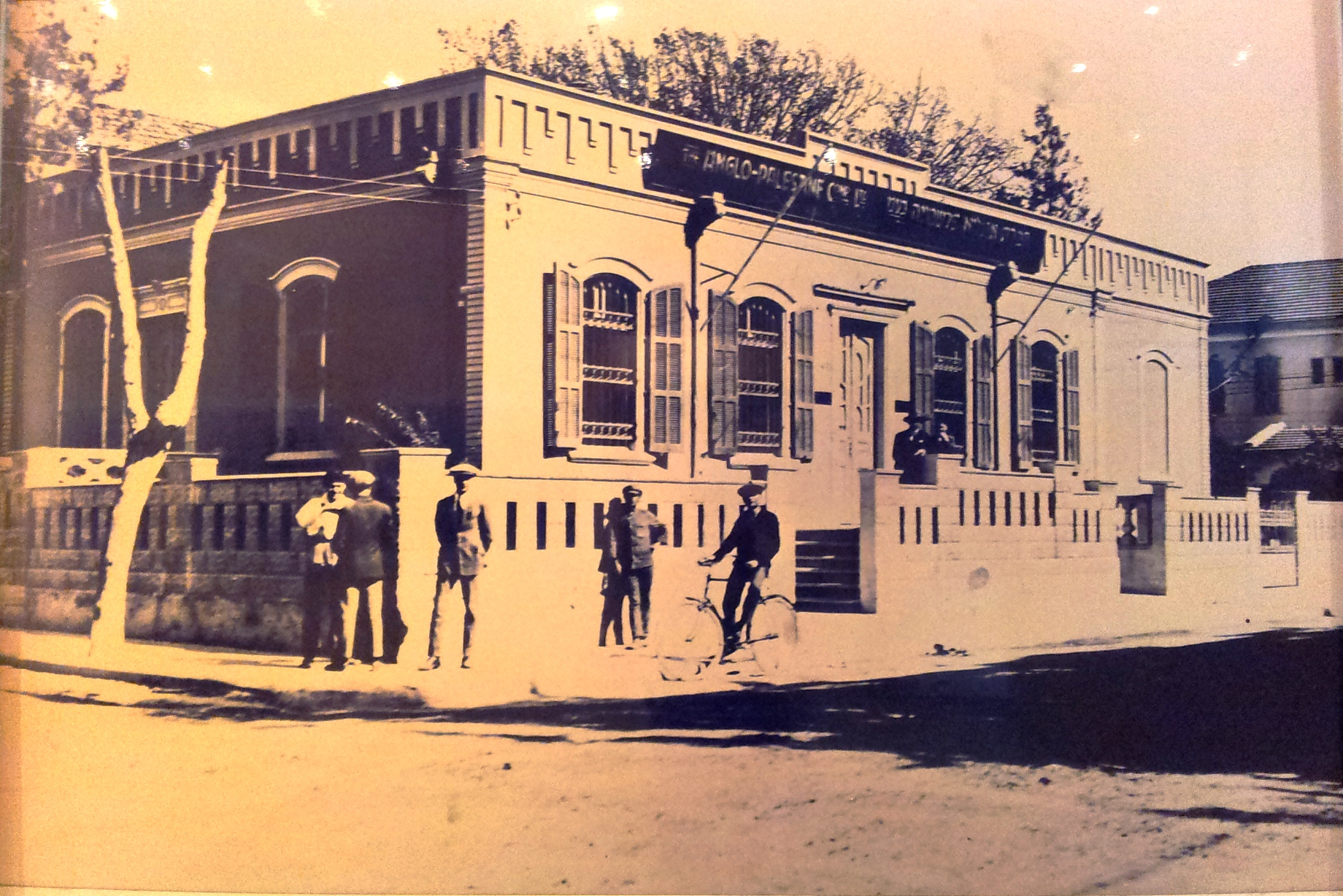
First branch of Anglo Palestine Bank, Tel Aviv, 1923

The antecedents of the Jewish Colonial Trust can be traced to Herzl's pamphlet Der Judenstaat (lit. The Jewish State), detailing his vision of how the Jewish State would be created. A major role was assigned in this vision to a huge body, to be called "The Jewish Company", which would be "founded as a joint stock company subject to English jurisdiction, framed according to English laws, and under the protection of England". In Herzl's vision, this Company would control virtually all the land in Palestine and would take care of transporting there millions of people within a few years – all, or nearly all, Jews living in the world. It would then take care of all the logistics of settling them in their new country, establishing them in urban and rural environments and getting agriculture, trade and industry going. For the Herculean tasks envisioned for it, Herzl estimated that the company's capital should be about a thousand million marks (about £50,000,000 or $200,000,000).

In practice, the Zionist movement was completely unable – either politically or financially – to undertake anything of remotely such dimensions. The actual "Jewish Colonial Trust" – established, indeed, in London – was in effect a small-scale model of the company envisioned in "Der Judenstaat": its capital a small fraction of the sum envisioned for "The Jewish Company" and its activity limited to transporting and settling small numbers of Jews on whatever limited parcels of land in Palestine the Zionist movement managed to buy. Even so, the "Colonial Trust" had a key role in the actual implementation of the Zionist project, towards eventual creation of Israel.

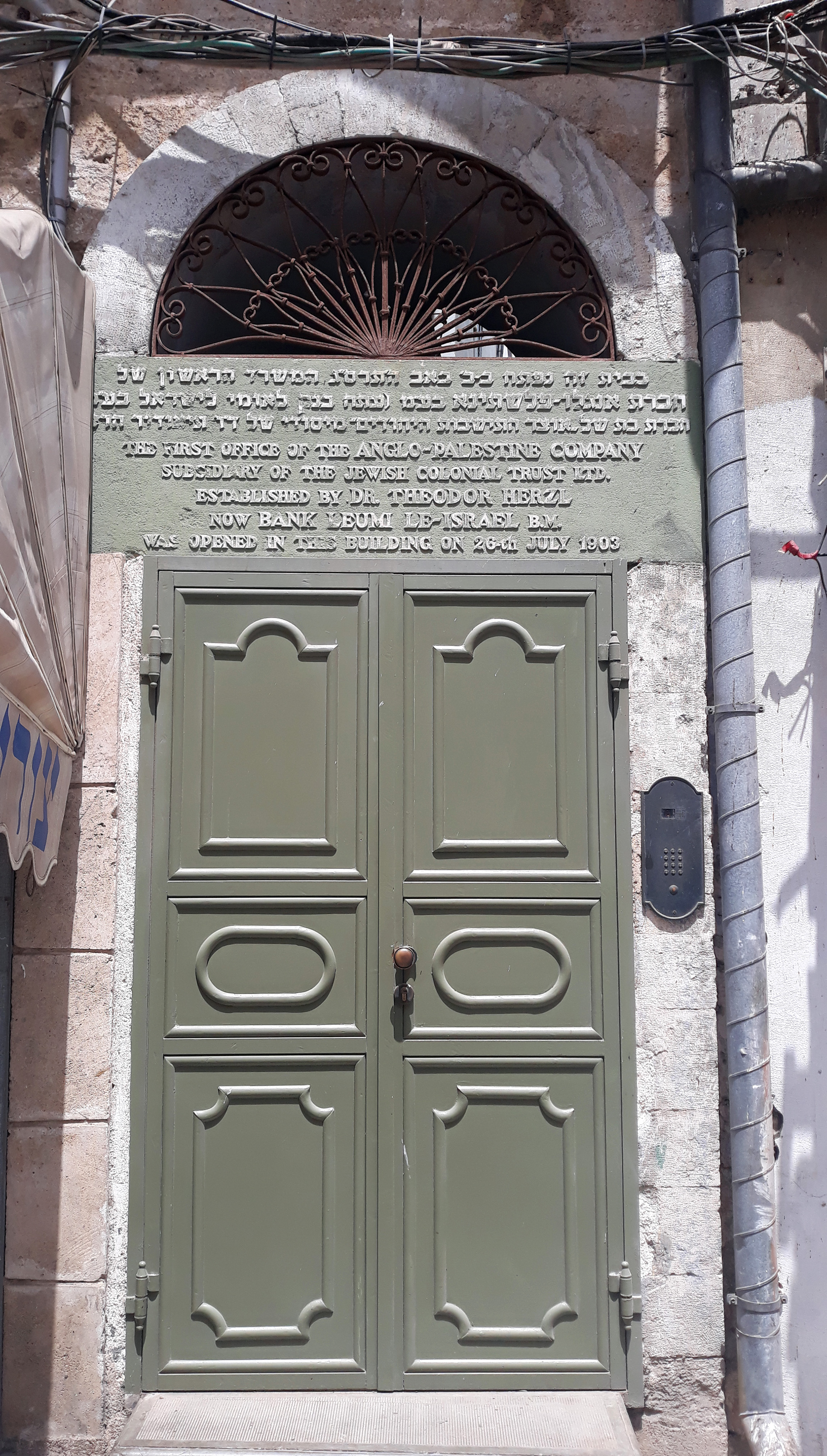
First office in Jaffa

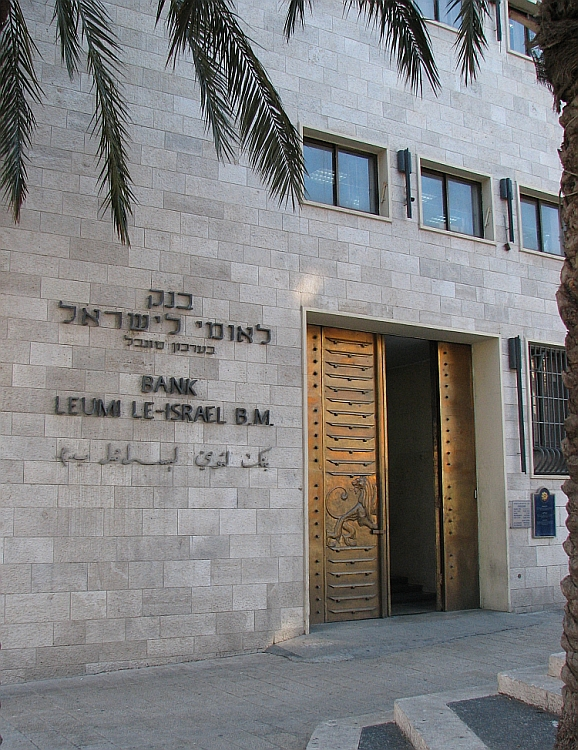
Historic Bank Leumi branch on Jaffa Road, Jerusalem

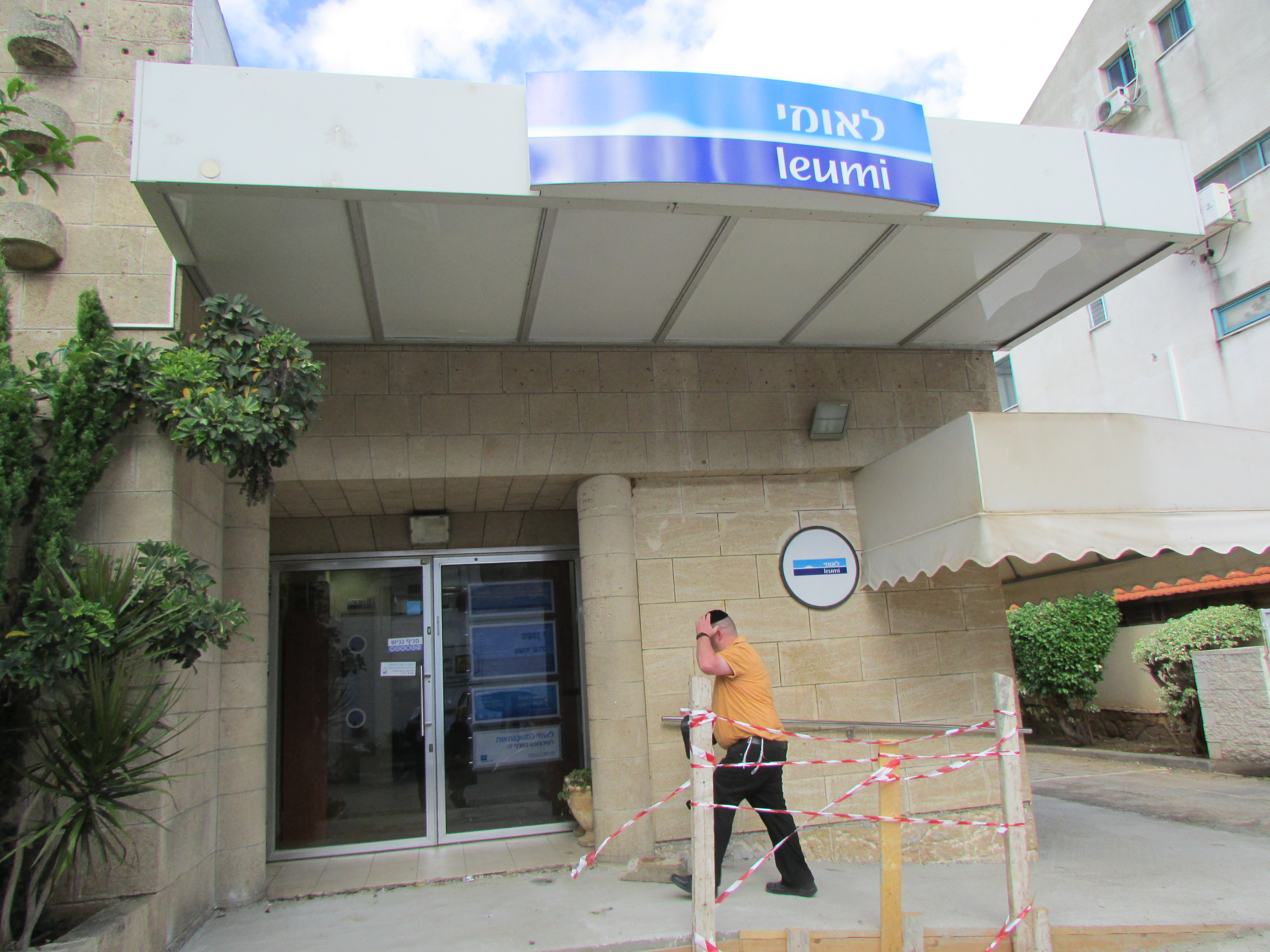
Branch of Bank Leumi in Zichron Yaacov

The Jewish Colonial Trust (German: Jüdische Kolonialbank), predecessor to the present Bank Leumi, was founded at the Second Zionist Congress in Basel and incorporated in London in 1899 as the financial instrument of the Zionist Organization. The initial capital raised—a total of £395,000—fell far short of the £8 million target; Nahum Sokolow wrote in 1919: "The British East Africa Company, which administered 200,000 square miles, began with the same amount £250,000."

=== Anglo-Palestine Bank ===
The bank's activities in Palestine were carried out by the Anglo-Palestine Bank, a subsidiary formed in 1902. The bank opened its first branch in Jaffa in 1903 under the management of Zalman David Levontin. Early transactions included land purchase, imports and obtaining concessions. Branches were opened in Jerusalem, Beirut, Hebron, Safed, Haifa, Tiberias and Gaza.

The Anglo-Palestine Bank offered farmers long-term loans and provided loans to the Ahuzat Bayit association which built the first neighborhood in Tel Aviv. During World War I, the Ottoman government declared the bank, which was registered in England, to be an enemy institution and moved to shut it down and confiscate its cash.

After World War I, its operations expanded. In 1932, the main branch moved from Jaffa to Jerusalem. During World War II, the Anglo-Palestine Bank helped to finance the establishment of industries that manufactured supplies for the British army.

=== Bank Leumi ===
After the founding of the state of Israel in 1948, the bank won the concession to issue new banknotes. In 1950, the bank was renamed Bank Leumi le-Israel (National Bank of Israel). When the Bank of Israel was established in 1954, Bank Leumi became a commercial bank.

In 1971, Bank Leumi acquired Arab Israel Bank (Ai Bank; est. 1960), which serves mainly the Arab Citizens of Israel in the north of the country. Ai Bank has 35 branches located in Israel's northern and Triangle regions.

The Government of Israel nationalized Bank Leumi in 1983, as a result of the Bank Stock Crisis.

In 2007, the bank denied being in possession of funds deposited by Jews who were murdered in the Holocaust. Although denying any wrongdoing, in 2011 the bank agreed to pay out 130m NIS after a state inquiry claimed 300m NIS was being held in 3,577 dormant accounts. The bank was accused of refusing to cooperate with the investigation by refraining from disclosing information about the large amounts of unclaimed money.

In 2011, Bank Leumi acquired Geneva-based Banque Safdie SA for CHF 143m. Bank Leumi merged Banque Safdie with Bank Leumi Switzerland Ltd to form Leumi Private Bank in early 2012.

In July 2014, Bank Julius Baer announced that it had purchased the private banking assets of Bank Leumi. Baer bought Bank Leumi (Luxembourg) S.A., Leumi's private bank in Luxembourg and Leumi will also transfer the clients of Leumi Private Bank to Baer.

In July 2019, Samer Haj-Yehia was appointed chairman.

Bank Leumi USA, the bank's U.S. subsidiary, was purchased by Valley National Bank in 2022 for US$1.2 billion in cash and stock.

In 2023 Pablo Rosenberg and Gal Toren began to serve as presenters of the Bank.

== Architecture ==
The main branch of Bank Leumi on Jaffa Road, Jerusalem, built during the British Mandate by the German Jewish architect Erich Mendelsohn, has been declared a landmark building.

The Bank Leumi branch on the corner of Ramban Street in Jerusalem's Rehavia neighborhood, an example of Bauhaus architecture, was designed by the German Jewish architect Leopold Krakauer. It was built in 1935 as a private home, and was renovated in 2007 to restore the original facade.

== Global presence ==
- Luxembourg – Due to the activities of Bank Leumi, David Kalai, and Nadav Kalai, Bank Leumi entered into a deferred prosecution agreement, in December 2014, with the US Department of Justice admitting that it conspired to hide assets and income in offshore accounts. The bank paid a fine of $270 million and turned over more than 1,500 names of its U.S. account holders.
- Canada – Leumi has representative offices in Toronto and Montreal
- Romania – Bank Leumi Romania S.A.
- Switzerland – Leumi Private Bank
- UK – Bank Leumi (UK) plc
- Uruguay – Leumi (Latin America) SA
- US – Bank Leumi USA -- purchased by Valley National Bank in 2022

== West Bank operations ==
In October 2017, Danish pension firm Sampension banned investment in Leumi alongside three other companies operating in illegal Israeli settlements in the West Bank, including Bank Hapoalim, Israeli telecoms firm Bezeq and German firm Heidelberg Cement.

On 12 February 2020, the United Nations published a database of 112 companies helping to further Israeli settlement activity in the West Bank, including East Jerusalem, as well as in the occupied Golan Heights. These settlements are considered illegal under international law. Bank Leumi was listed on the database on account of its "provision of services and utilities supporting the maintenance and existence of settlements" and "banking and financial operations helping to develop, expand or maintain settlements and their activities" in these occupied territories. On 5 July 2021, Norway's largest pension fund KLP said it would divest from Bank Leumi together with 15 other business entities implicated in the UN report for their links to Israeli settlements in the occupied West Bank.

== See also ==
- Economy of Israel
- Banking in Israel
