= Moshe Sanbar =

Israeli economist (1926–2012)

- משה זנבר
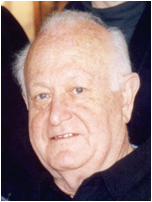
- Born: Gusztáv Sandberg; 29 March 1926; Kecskemét, Hungary
- Died: 1 October 2012 (aged 86); Tel Aviv, Israel
- Education: Hebrew University of Jerusalem (MA)
- Occupations: Economist Governor of the Bank of Israel (1971-1976); Chair of Bank Leumi Board of Directors (1988-1995) President of ICC Israel (1992-2003)
- Years active: 1951–2012
- Spouse: Bracha Rabinovich (m. 1951)

Moshe Sanbar (Hebrew: משה זנבר; March 29, 1926 – October 1, 2012) was an economist and Israeli public figure. He served as Governor of the Bank of Israel (1971–76) and chairman of Bank Leumi (1988–95).

Sanbar was born in Hungary, surviving the Second World War as a prisoner at Dachau Concentration Camp. In the State of Israel, he began his professional work as an economic researcher and became gradually involved in the work of the Ministry of Finance as head of the research division (1958–60), deputy director of the State Income Directorate (1960–63), head of the Budget Directorate and economic advisor to the minister (1963–68). He served as a professional consultant to finance ministers Levi Eshkol and Pinhas Sapir, also acting for the latter in his post as Minister of Trade and Industry (1970–71). In the years 1977 to 1981, he was chairman of the Sanbar Commission concerning the local authorities in Israel and its relations with the central government.

Initially, he was an academic and researcher in economics and statistics. However, after leaving the civil service, he became more associated with his roles in the private sector as chairman of various financial and industrial institutions, and even more so in the public sector, engaging in activities related to education, culture, sports, and science. He was for many years involved with Habima Theatre, the College of Management and headed ICC in Israel. In the late 1980s he began his involvement in benefiting Holocaust survivors, founding the Israeli umbrella organization of holocaust survivors in Israel, bringing together more than 50 independent organizations. He was the world treasurer and the chairman of the executive in the Claims Conference, member of international commissions on property restitution and a champion for the needs of holocaust survivors.

== Biography ==
=== Early life ===
Sanbar was born as Gusztáv Sandberg on March 29, 1926, in Kecskemét, Hungary to Salomon Sandberg and Miriam (Margit) née Klausner, both of whom perished during the Holocaust in Hungary in 1944. His father had been in Hungary representing the family business of import and export of agricultural produce and poultry. The father had first been arrested by the Nazis and taken to a labor camp in 1941 but was released due to his old age, until his later arrest in 1944. His mother had died in 1944 in Auschwitz.

In his youth he was active in various sports: table tennis, fencing, wrestling and soccer. As a competitive wrestler he was champion of the high school league in Southern Hungary. Shortly after the Nazi occupation of Hungary and in response to the removal of Jewish players from the various sport teams, Sanbar founded a national soccer league for Jewish players. Prior to the war, he was a right midfielder in the youth soccer league for Southern Hungary.

In early June 1944, Sanbar was recruited to the labor battalions of the Hungarian Army. In October 1944 his unit was marched to the Austrian border and taken to Dachau concentration camp in Germany. He was released by the Allied forces on May 2, 1945 near Seeshaupt, while on transport via Holocaust trains to an extermination camp. Upon his liberation, Sanbar contracted typhus while in a field hospital. His experiences during the war were later recorded in his book My Longest Year, one of the first memoirs printed in Israel by a survivor of the holocaust.

Prior to the war Sanbar was a member of a social club founded by Erik Molnár, where he was exposed to various economic theories. Following his return to Hungary and a recuperating period, Sanbar studied economics at the Budapest University of Technology and Economics. In Budapest, he was a member of Hapoel sports association.

During this time, Sanbar joined the HaOved HaTzioni movement and headed the emigrant training programs in Hungary. He was a member of the executive of the Zionist organization in Hungary. Earlier and prior to WWII, at the age of seventeen, he won a writing competition in his hometown on a play focused on the Land of Israel.

In early 1948, Sanbar joined the Hagana and headed a group of 60 emigrants to the British Mandate of Palestine in Aliyah Bet. He arrived in Israel in May 1948, was drafted to the IDF and badly injured during the Battle of Latrun in the 1948 Arab–Israeli War.

His MA studies at the Hebrew University of economics, statistics and sociology were completed in 1953.

=== Professional career ===
==== Research and academia ====
In 1951, Sanbar began work as a researcher and statistician at the Institute for Social Applied Research headed by Louis Guttman, becoming deputy director of the institute in 1956. From 1957 to 1962 he was also a member of faculty in the Hebrew University of Jerusalem.

He was a pioneer researcher in the fields of consumer economics and the division of income. His research on the latter was groundbreaking and valuable for being one of the first of its kind worldwide based on a wide public survey. Its comprehensive findings served as a basis for a series of articles printed in The Economic Quarterly.

==== Ministry of Finance ====
In 1958 Sanbar entered the civil service, working at the Ministry of Finance as founding director of the research division of the Income Directorate (1958–59) and appointed as a professional deputy director of the directorate (1960–63). He was involved in ministry's work concerning taxation and headed many of the governmental committees on these matters, including the 1962 devaluation. Sanbar continued to research on division income and apply it to his professional work, among other things in his capacity from 1962 to 1966 as coordinator of the government's commission for national income division.

During these years Sanbar was involved with financial legislation and headed multiple government committees of financial concern. He was also a government representative in various boards of directors of government corporations such as Mekorot, also serving for several years chairman of the finance committee for El Al and in 1967 the founding chairman of the Israel Sports Betting Board in charge of the national football pool.

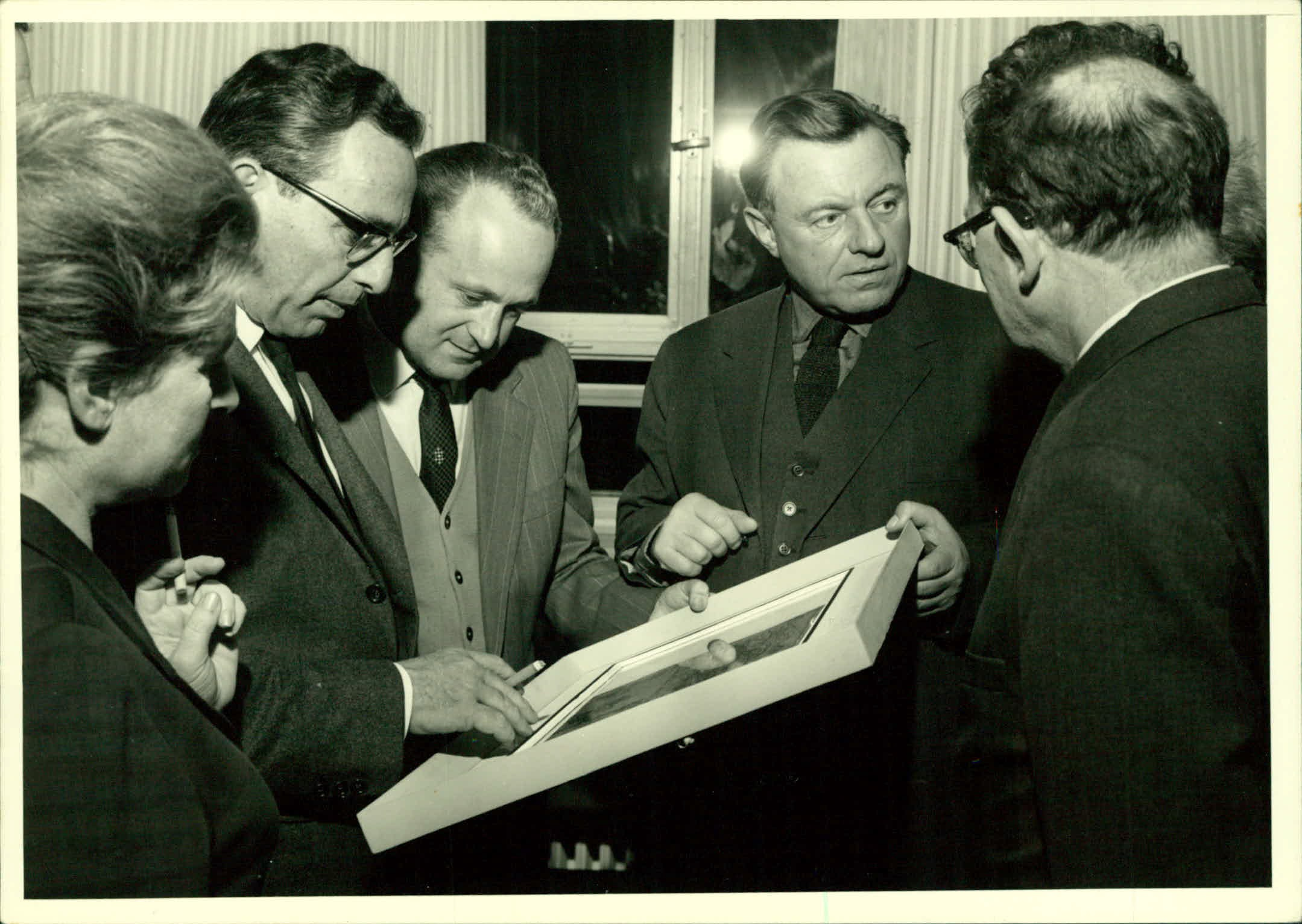
A gathering at Israel's Prime Minister's Office honoring the outgoing director-general Teddy Kollek. Left of Kollek are Sanbar and Tzvi Tzur.

Following the appointment of Levi Eshkol as prime minister and Pinhas Sapir as minister of finance, Sanbar was appointed as the chief financial advisor to the Ministry and several months later, as Director of Budgeting. His approach consisted of a four-year budget planning consistent with long-term development plans for each sector of the economy. On this issue, he was asked to advise the United Nations and tasked by them to write the manual book “Budget and Planning”. His main influence over the budgeting process was by including an annual estimate on the effects of the budget proposal on various income groups. Furthermore, he chaired the governmental Efficiency Commission aimed at improving the public service in both quality and production. At the same time, Sanbar also led the governmental Automation Commission, formulating a plan on automation and computerization in the civil service. In his capacity as chief financial advisor to the Ministry of Finance, he was among the initiators of the 1966 recession policy.

Through his work in the Ministry of Finance Sanbar promoted the development of industry and science, replacing governmental loans with research grants and by establishing the first scientific complexes nearby university campuses. In addition, he encouraged the ability and means for exporting knowledge and services.

Throughout the 1960s, Sanbar was responsible for the government's policy on wages, extending beyond the civil service and in concern with all sectors of the economy. As worker strikes became frequent from 1963 to 1965, Sanbar and Oded Messer (director general of the Ministry of Labor) were arbitrators in all labor disputes.

At the request of Prime Minister Levi Eshkol, following the Six-Day War he oversaw the economic policies concerning the Palestinians in the West Bank and in the Gaza Strip, as well as the development of unified Jerusalem: the development of the Western Wall, rehabilitation of the Jewish Quarter in the Old City of Jerusalem, creation of a green belt surrounding the Walls of Jerusalem and creating feasible connecting routes to Zion Gate and to Mount Scopus.

Sanbar left his post as director of budgeting in April 1968 and as chief financial advisor to the Ministry three months later. As result of the World Economic Conference held in Jerusalem, he complied with requests of Prime Minister Eshkol and foreign investors to serve as vice chairperson of the newsly founded Israel Corporation and in charge of its investment policy.

==== Chairman of the Industrial Development Bank ====
In 1968, Minister of Finance Ze'ev Sherf appointed Sanbar as deputy chairman of the Industrial Development Bank, later to be formally appointed as chairperson in 1970 following the passing of chairman Yeshayahu Foerder. In February 1971 he was also made chairman of the government company for financing industries, as part of an intended merger with the bank-owned investment company. Between 1968 and 1971, the bank had given out greater development loans given since it was established in 1957. The bank's business cycle had also shown significant growth, from 330 million Israeli pound in 1968 to more than 600 million in 1971.

==== Acting Minister of Trade and Industry ====
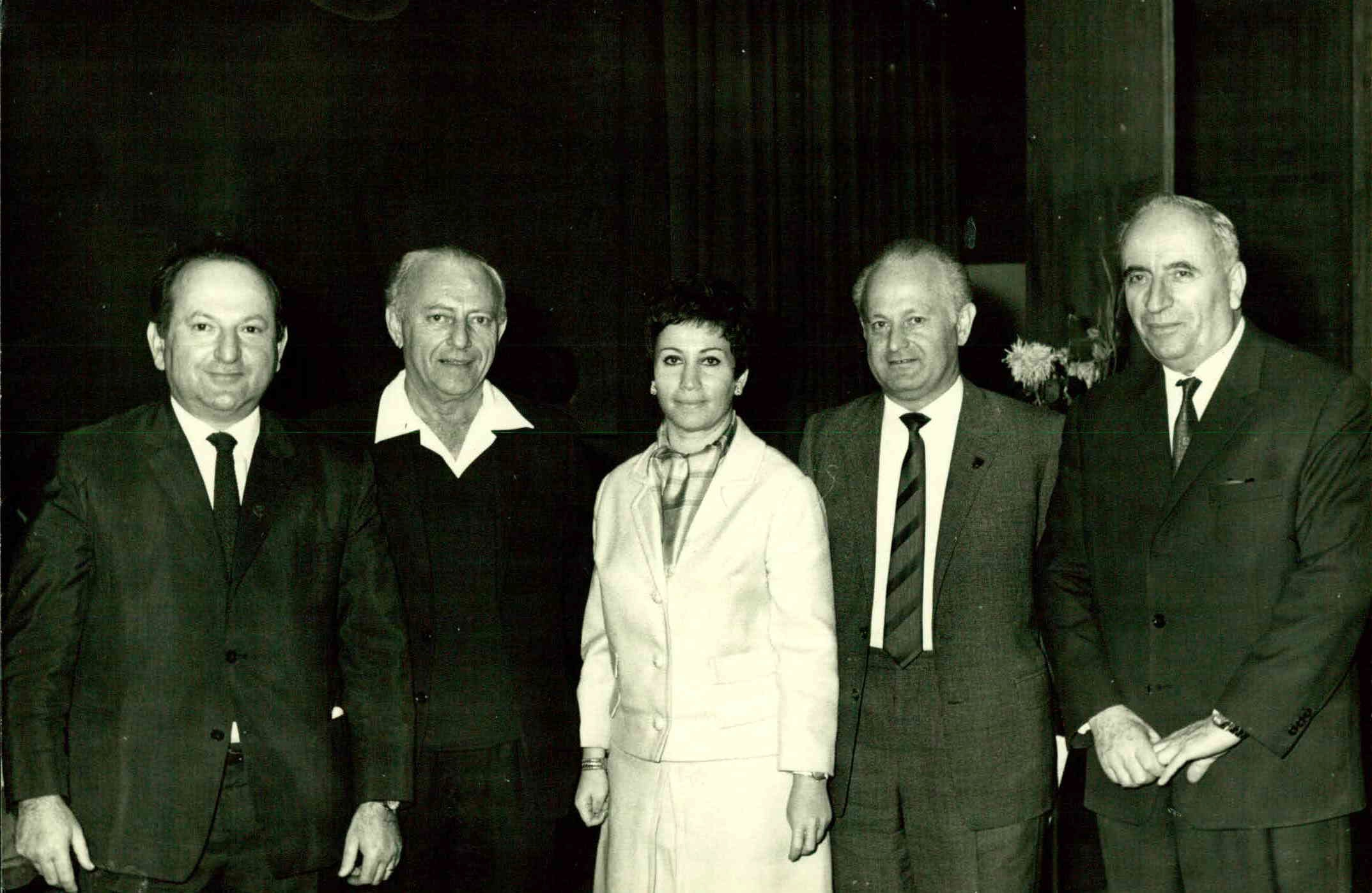
National Congress of Social Workers n Israel, 1972. From right to left: Histadrut executive Yeruham Meshel, acting Minister Sandberg, Union member Ora Openheim, Minister of Welfare Michael Hasani and Director General of the National Insurance Institute Yisrael Katz.

In 1970–1971, Sanbar served as acting minister of commerce and industry in Israel's fifteenth government headed by Golda Meir, acting for Minister Sapir who remained active in his simultaneous appointment as Minister of Finance. Sanbar was made Sapir's “special advisor” and carried all ministerial authority. In this capacity, he was charged with coordinating the government efforts preventing prices spiral and inflation, triggered by security threats that forced further taxation. Sanbar orchestrated the "package deal" signed with the Histadrut, allowing increased taxation alongside wage growth, supported by the industry's willingness to absorb growing costs of production.

The ministry of commerce and industry was focused during this time in promoting legislation concerning consumer protection and prevention of unjust competition. Sanbar was also involved in recommending the development of Merkava battle tanks for its positive aspect in terms of Israel's industry.

Simultaneously to this role, Sanbar was also an economic advisor to Pinhas Sapir at the Ministry of Finance, serving as chairman of the Economic Advisory Council. In that capacity, he was greatly involved in the 1971 devaluation.

==== Governor of the Bank of Israel ====
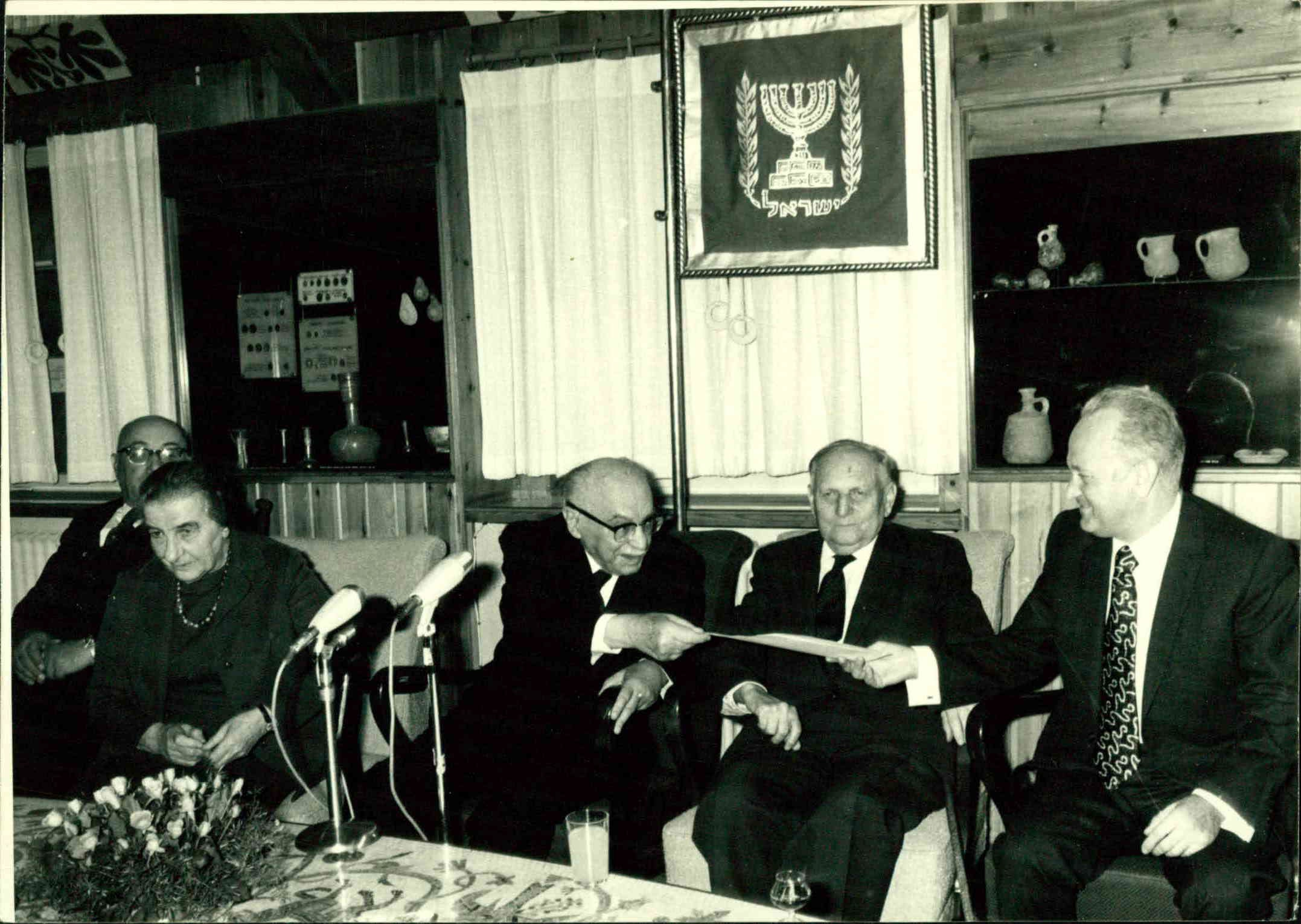
President Zalman Shazar hands Moshe Sanbar his official letter of appointment as Governor of the Bank of Israel. Also shown are Prime Minister Golda Meir and outgoing Governor David Horowitz.

Between 1971 and 1976 Sanbar served as Governor of the Bank of Israel. His term in office was characterized by a series of events which made it one of the most complex times in the history of Israeli economy: the budgetary consequences of the Yom Kippur War, the 1970s energy crisis which quadrupled prices of gas in Israel and the increase in expenses due to a renewed arms race in the Middle East following the Six Day War. The monetary policy was greatly affected and the “emergency credit” policy taken by him during the Yom Kippur War was instrumental in maintaining a stabilized market.

In aggrievance towards the leaderships of industry and agriculture, Sanbar pushed for cancelling the existing approach differentiating subsidized credit from direct credit. In addition, Liquidity rates were lowered for expatriates from 90 percent to 10 percent, making the local banking system an important factor among Jewish communities worldwide. For the first time, the central bank was given responsibility supervising the foreign exchange market, and devaluation of the Israeli pound were being done in relation to the currency basket instead of the American dollar. Further developments in the Israeli economy included the founding of the First International Bank, as well as the dissolution of Agudat Yisrael Bank and of the Israel-British Bank. The two events were the trigger for reevaluating the Banking Law in Israel and a legislative proposal was put forward, only to be partially approved in 1981.

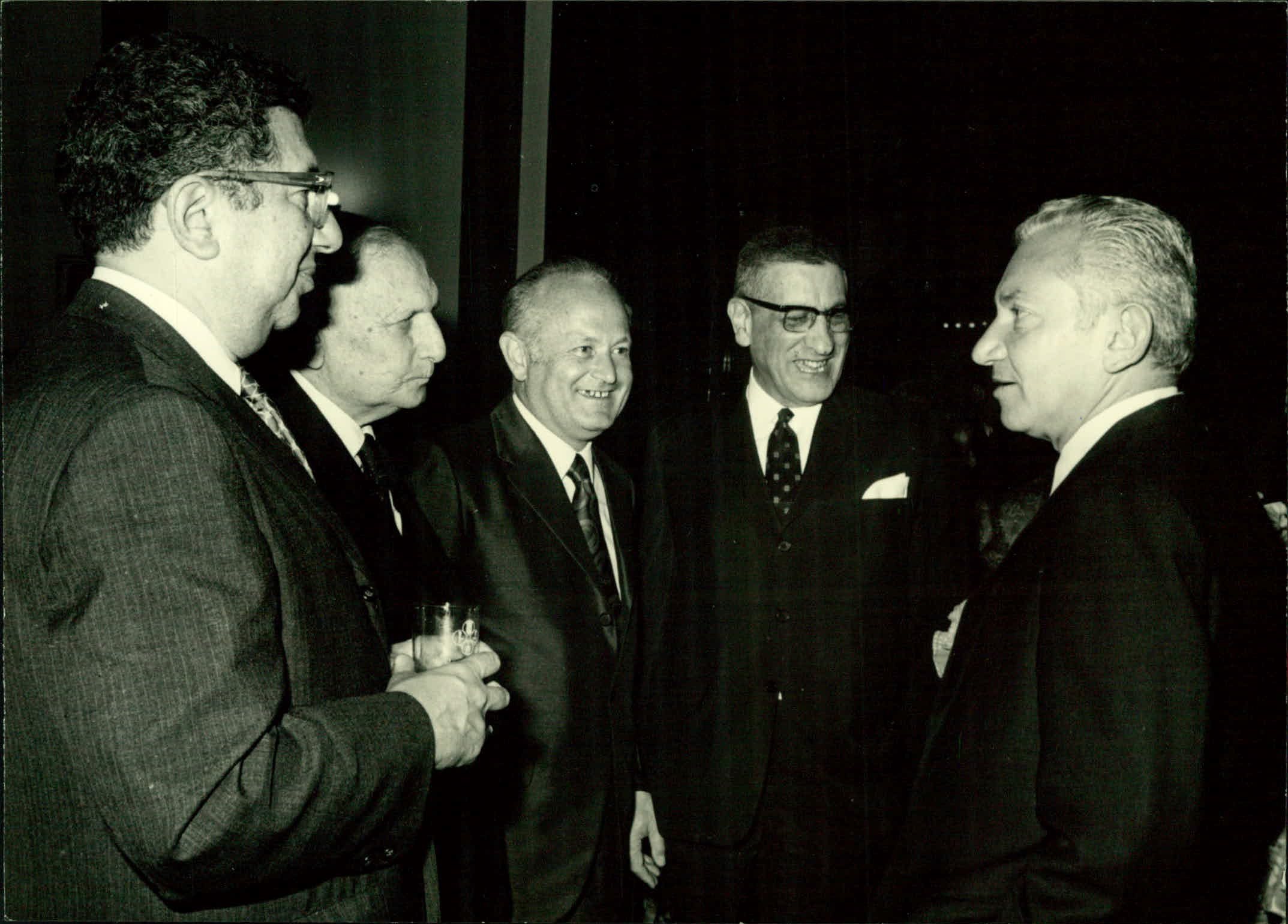
Visit of Herbert Stein in Israel in 1972. From left to right: Stein, David Horowitz, Governor Sanbar, State Comptroller Yitzhak Nebenzahl, Trade Minister Chaim Bar-Lev.

As governor, Sanbar represented Israel in the International Monetary Fund, the World Bank and the International Centre for Settlement of Investment Disputes, as well as the United Nations Conference on Trade and Development and the Inter-American Development Bank. Two of his international initiatives gained fame and were each related to as the “Sanbar Proposal”:

1. A Proposal for the establishment of an institution providing guarantees for the export of capital between developing countries (This was later adopted by the organization of Latin American states)
2. A plan for gradual sale and demonetization of monetary gold under the supervision of the IMF.

Within the Bank of Israel, following almost two decades of David Horowitz's tenure, Sanbar was responsible for the modernization of the bank: A public complaints office was formed, the dispersed personnel focused on the foreign exchange market was formed into a central department, as well as the creation of a centralized legal counsel overseeing the legal aid in the bank's departments. Furthermore, the department for bank regulation was empowered by separating its regulatory responsibility over credit into an independent department.

The collapse of the Israel-British Bank was the first incident to invoke the Bank of Israel's authority, created by legislation passed in 1969, to appoint a bank director on behalf of the central bank and to provide the bank clients with guarantees. The swift resolutions made towards the account holders was a turning point in regulatory supervision on aspects of inter-national banking, despite the complexity of the specific circumstances causing the dissolution of the bank to be finalized only after more than three decades. A commission of inquiry chaired by Meir Shamgar completed its findings in 1975, finding Sanbar's acts to have been adequate.

Sanbar was outspoken on the need for separation between the role of the governor of the central bank and the role of economic advisor to the government. However, considering the role as it was, during his term the Bank of Israel's research department was central in preparation of policy papers and in establishing a professional database for monetary data to be used by all relevant government authorities, as well as preparation of econometric projections.

In early 1976 Sanbar announced he would not seek appointment for a second term in November. It was speculated he would be appointed as chairman of Hadera Paper company, but he ultimately declined the position.

Sanbar's signature is found on the Israeli Pound fourth series.

==== Sanbar Commission ====
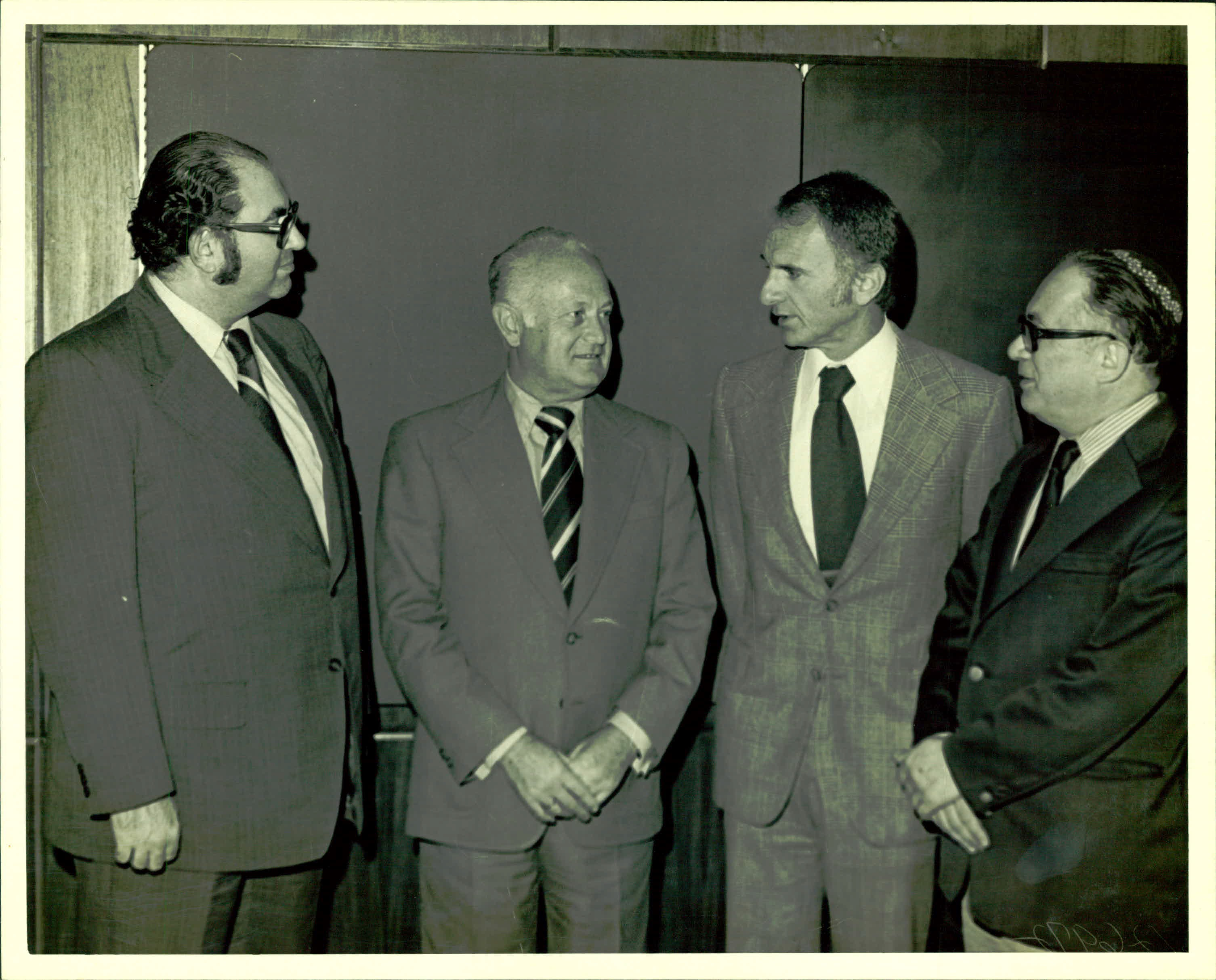
Members of the Sanbar Commission meeting with Supervisor Edmund Edelman of Los Angeles' Third District. Pictured right to left: Prof. Daniel Elazar, Governor Sanbar, Supervisor Edelman, director general of the Israeli Ministry of Interior Haim Kovarsky.

Despite leaving the civil service, in the years 1977–1981 he accepted Prime Minister Yitzhak Rabin's request to chair a governmental commission on municipal affairs, on a volunteer basis. The commission was operated by five committees, two of which were headed by Sanbar himself: the subcommittee for funding of local authorities and the subcommittee for examining the relation between the central government and local authorities in matters of public services. The commission's five subcommittees operated about 120 teams.

The commission produced twenty interim reports and following its first report, legislative action was taken in 1978 to implement some of its initial recommendations. Its final report was presented to Prime Minister Menachem Begin in June 1981. Central recommendations in the commission's report called for: Increase in the independent income of local authorities, setting criteria for government support in the local government and the listing of standard services to be controlled by the local authorities and/or supported by the state budget.

Despite support in the Knesset and by the Federation of Local Authorities in Israel, objections by Finance Minister Yoram Aridor brought forward only partial implementation. It was only after the formation of a new government in 1984 that the full report was adopted by the government.

==== Private sector ====
From 1977 onwards, Sanbar held various positions in the private sector, as chairman of industrial and financial institutions: Electrochemical Industries (1977–82), Atzmaut Bank for Mortgages and Development, Le Nacional Insurance (1985–91), Zelon Ltd. (1981–90), M.G. Rubber Industries (1984–88), Solel Boneh (1986) and others. In 1978, he was appointed as member of the executive of the Manufacturers Association of Israel and in 1981 as a member of its presidium.

Throughout the 1980s he was mentioned repeatedly as a possible candidate for minister of finance. He was also consulted often by Shimon Peres during his terms as prime minister and minister of finance and was instrumental in orchestrating the 1984 “package deal” In 1985, he advised on the Economic Stabilization Plan. In 1984–1985 he was a member of the public committee appointed by minister of finance Yitzhak Moda'i for determining prioritization in public expense and the state budget.

===== Chairman of Bank Leumi =====
From 1988 to 1995, Sanbar chaired Bank Leumi's board of directors and its subordinate banking firms. In the two years prior to his appointment, three chairmen resigned and the bank suffered from an ongoing labor dispute. Furthermore, the bank faced various financial crises such as debts of the Kibbutz Movement estimated at one billion US dollars and debts of Koor Industries estimated at 150 million US dollars.

Sanbar formed a new decision-making process in the bank, relying on professional subcommittees set by the board of directors. Additionally, he incorporated a new business approach, subjugating the bank's aid towards insolvency solely to corporations taking actual steps to better their own state of affairs. Up to Sanbar's end of term in 1995, the bank had a stable leadership and had seen renewed growth in its organizational structure and in its net profit. This was enhanced by Sanbar's approach in favor of the bank's involvement in venture capital in forming “Teuza” fund, as well as the Israel Growth Fund for investments.

Sanbar also chaired the bank's subsidiaries in London and Switzerland, as well as the bank-owned development company Africa-Israel Group. Throughout, the dissolution of the Soviet Union, the bank reopened its branches in Germany and in 1990 a subsidiary credit company was created in Budapest. At the time Sanbar was involved in deliberations between the Israeli and Soviet chambers of commerce in forming an economic and industrial cooperation agreement. In 1993, Bank Leumi collaborated with Arab Israel Bank and numerous European banking firms in establishing the First International Palestinian Bank, but the effort did not come to fruition after the Cave of the Patriarchs massacre.

Bank Leumi embraced during these years a policy of corporate social responsibility and, among other things, funded the restoration of Bialik House. Sanbar also collaborated with Sigmund Sternberg and Salim Joubran in creating a special fund by the Arab Israel Bank for development and funding of community projects and entrepreneurship targeted at Arab Christians in Israel. Sanbar also joined the board of a non-governmental organization aimed at joining together economic and industrial corporations in promotion of environmental issues.

For numerous years, Sanbar was chairman of the executive of the Association of Banks in Israel. In 1989, he was appointed as a member of the Bank of Israel's Advisory Council.

In 1995, Sanbar did not seek reelection to the bank's board of directors. For another year he continued as chairman of bank's subsidiary in Switzerland and the subsidiary focused on investments. In 1996 he left his duties at the bank, becoming a member of the board at Fairchild Corporation and a financial consultant.

===== President of ICC in Israel =====
Between 1992 and 2003, Sanbar served as president of the International Chamber of Commerce in Israel. He was also elected on two occasions, in the years 1997-1999 and 2002-2003, to serve on the international executive board ICC. When first elected in 1996, he was the first person from Israel to sit on the international board.

Locally, Sanbar was involved with the Chamber of Commerce for many years. In 1987 he was made an honorary member of the board of directors of the Tel Aviv Chamber of Commerce. Until 2003 he was also a member of the presidium of the Chambers of Commerce Association in Israel.

=== Public work ===
Throughout the years Sanbar was active in voluntary work in cultural, educational and social organizations. On multiple occasions, wages guaranteed to him in his capacity as an arbitator would be given directly to various public causes and towards charity.

As an arbitrator, Sanbar was also involved in various cases of public interest: in 1978 he resolved the wage disputes in the merchant navy, in 1986 he was a mediator in conflicts raised by the printed press outlets towards possible legislation enabling commercial broadcasting on television. He also chaired numerous public committees on various subjects, such as the reorganization of Clalit Health Services in 1986 and the committee for the organizational structure of the World Zionist Organization and the Jewish Agency in 1988.

At the same time, Sanbar was also involved in Uriel Reichman's attempt of formulating a proposed Constitution of Israel, a final draft of which was presented in 1988.

Sanbar's main roles (as head of organizations) in his volunteer work for non-governmental social and cultural organizations included the following:

| Year | Position | Notes |
|---|---|---|
| ~1966-71 | Founding Chairman, Fund for Excelling Athletes | See more |
| 1967–68 | Chairman, Israel Sports Betting Board | |
| 1969–96 | Chairman, Economic Development and Refugee Rehabilitation Trust | See more |
| 1969–81 | Chairman, Habima Theatre | See more |
| 1972–95 | Chairman, Board of Trustees, College of Management | See more, also Executive chairman, 1983–89. |
| Since 1974 | Honorary President, World Federation of Hungarian Speaking Jews | |
| 1979–82 | Chairman, United Jewish Appeal | Promoted projects in development of the Galilee |
| 1982–2012 | Founding President, Janco-Dada Museum | See more |
| 1983–84 | Founding Chairman, Association for Good Governance | |
| 1983–? | Chairman, Bimama Children's Theatre | |
| 1984–89 | Chairman, Association for Israel-Hungary Relations | After 1989 as President |
| 1985–95 | Chairman, Israel-Belgium Cultural Foundation | Founding member in 1979 |
| 1987–99 | President, Inbar Organization for Rheumatic Patients | Formerly founding chairman, 1985–87 |
| 1987–2003 | Founding chairman, Umbrella Organization for Holocaust Survivors in Israel | See more, also honorary president, 2003–11 and reappointed as chairman, 2011–12. |
| 1989–? | Chairman, Association of Banks in Israel | |
| 1992–2003 | President, ICC Israel | See more |
| 1990s | Chairman, Board of Trustees, Massuah Institute for Holocaust Studies | |
| 1995–2012 | Chairman, Rosenrauch Foundation | |
| 2003–12 | Chairman, Public Council of the Yiddishpiel Theatre | |

==== Israeli-Palestinian conflict resolution ====
In 1969, Prime Minister Golda Meir appointed Sanbar to draft an alternative plan to that made by the United Nations on dealing with settlement of Palestinian refugees and compensations on abandoned properties. He had drafted an economic-political development plan, which was initially shelved due to the negotiations started by UN Special Representative Gunnar Jarring, but was reintroduced three years later, when prime minister Meir had asked Sanbar, then in his position of governor of the central bank, to update the proposal and introduce it before the World Bank and in his work sessions with Robert McNamara. He was also tasked with reviewing proposals concerning the construction of the Mediterranean–Dead Sea Canal. Later, he presented prime minister Rabin with an economic plan for negotiating the issue of Palestinian refugees with neighboring Arab countries, but it was not put forward for discussion.

In 1969, Sanbar was among the founding members of the “Rehovot Group” led by Amos de-Shalit, a non-governmental think tank focused on articulating economic and social policies for Israel, while taking under consideration the needs of its Arab population.

Together with Shimon Peres and others, Sanbar created the Economic Development and Refugee Rehabilitation Trust and was appointed as its chairperson. He continued to hold this position also as governor of the Bank of Israel, with the Trust having focus on humanitarian aid to the territories of the West Bank and the Gaza Strip. On its first year of action, the trust put forward two million Israeli pounds towards water facilities, basic health services and vocational trainings. During the trust's first four years of action, more than 3 million Israeli pounds were used for renovating refugee camps in the Gaza Strip and new housing was built at Nuseirat Camp, Bureij and Al-Shati, as well as water infrastructures at Nur Shams, Jenin, Jalazone and Nur Shams, electric infrastructure at Jenin, development of sports facilities in Gaza, renovation of Al-Shifa Hospital and the construction of nine medical clinics in the West Bank and several centers of vocational training in Gaza and Rafiah.

The Rehabilitation Trust continued to exist for more than two decades, however its actions varied and in later years focused on humanitarian aid surrounding the Israel-Lebanon border and the Good Fence policy.

==== Cultural institutions ====
===== Chairman of Habima National Theatre =====
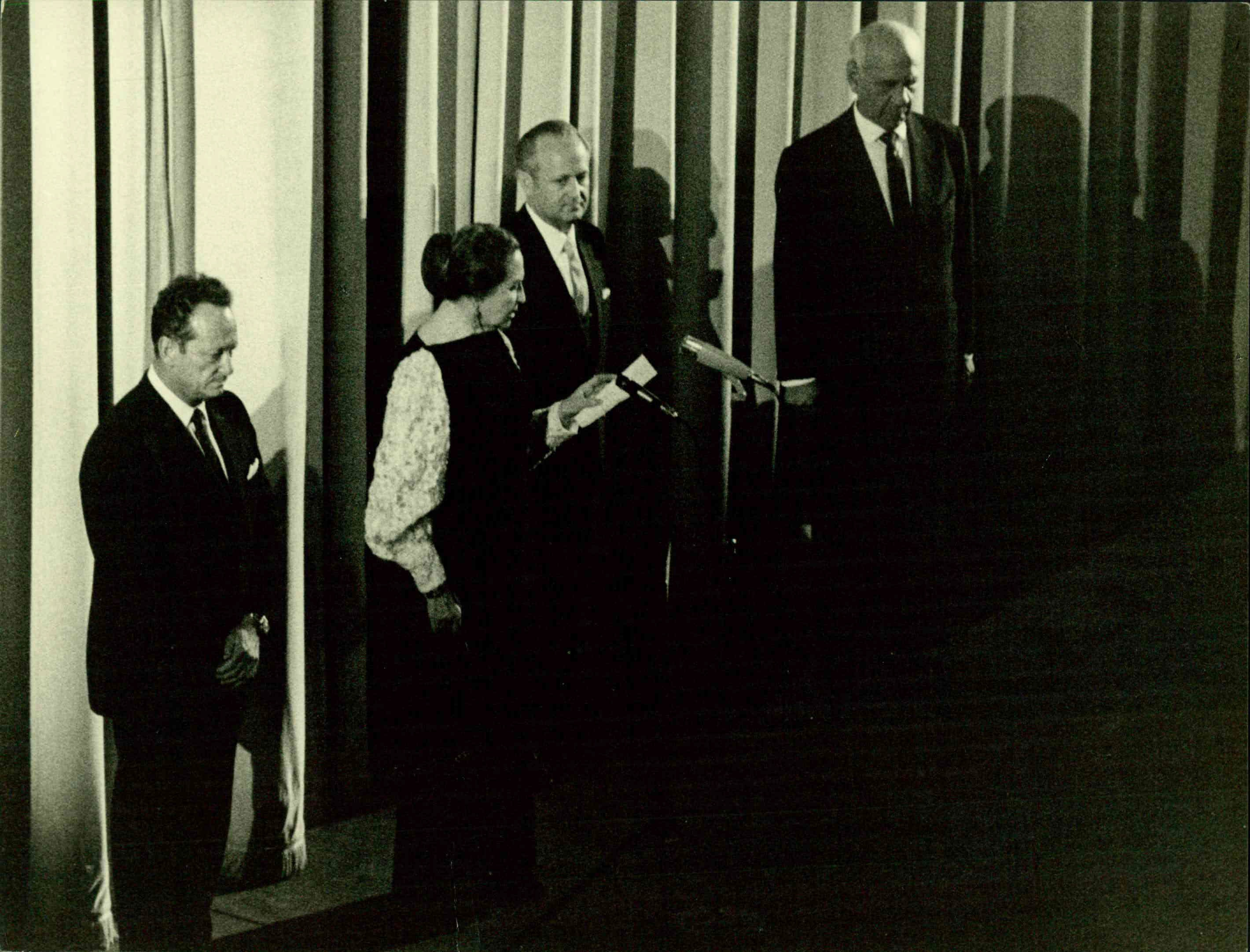
Dedication of Habima Theatre's new hall. From left to right: Minister of Education and Culture Yigal Allon, actress Hana Rovina, Sanbar and actor Aharon Meskin.

For twelve years, Sanbar was chairman of the board of trustees of Habima Theatre, beginning in 1969 at the dissolution of the theatre as a collective and until 1981. Over this decade, the theatre transitioned to its recognition as Israel's national theatre, claiming a new artistic approach to go with its status. Two policy papers were drafted under the leadership of Sanbar, one for defining the vision of Habima as a national theatre and the other for determining division of responsibilities between the theatre's general director and its artistic director. These years of transition were also successful in drawing new crowds to the theatre: encouraging encounters of the cast with the general public, adapting the theatrical program to the needs of the Ministry of Education, creating the theatre's first subscription program and also incorporating fringe theatre in one of the theatre halls.

===== Founding of Janco-Dada Museum =====
In 1979, Sanbar began to head the association for creating a museum in honor of painter Marcel Janco at the artists’ colony of Ein Hod. Two years later, raising of funds was completed and the museum was opened to the public in 1983. For three decades, until his death in 2012, Sanbar was its honorary president.

==== Promoting sports and excelling athletes ====
In 1967 Sanbar was appointed as the first chairman of Israel Sports Betting Board, an organization in charge of the national football pool. This complimented his existing position as chairman of the Fund for Excelling Athletes. Until 1970, the Fund awarded a sum of approximately 500 thousand Israeli pounds to athletes representing 17 different sport fields. It was at Sanbar's personal request in various cases of arbitration he took part in, that the fund was given donations, such as funds in 1969 that were directed towards the purchase of six rowing boats in preparation for Israeli representatives competing in Sailing at the 1972 Summer Olympics.

Sanbar chaired the Fund for Excelling Athletes until his appointment as Governor of the Bank of Israel.

==== Academia and the founding of College of Management ====
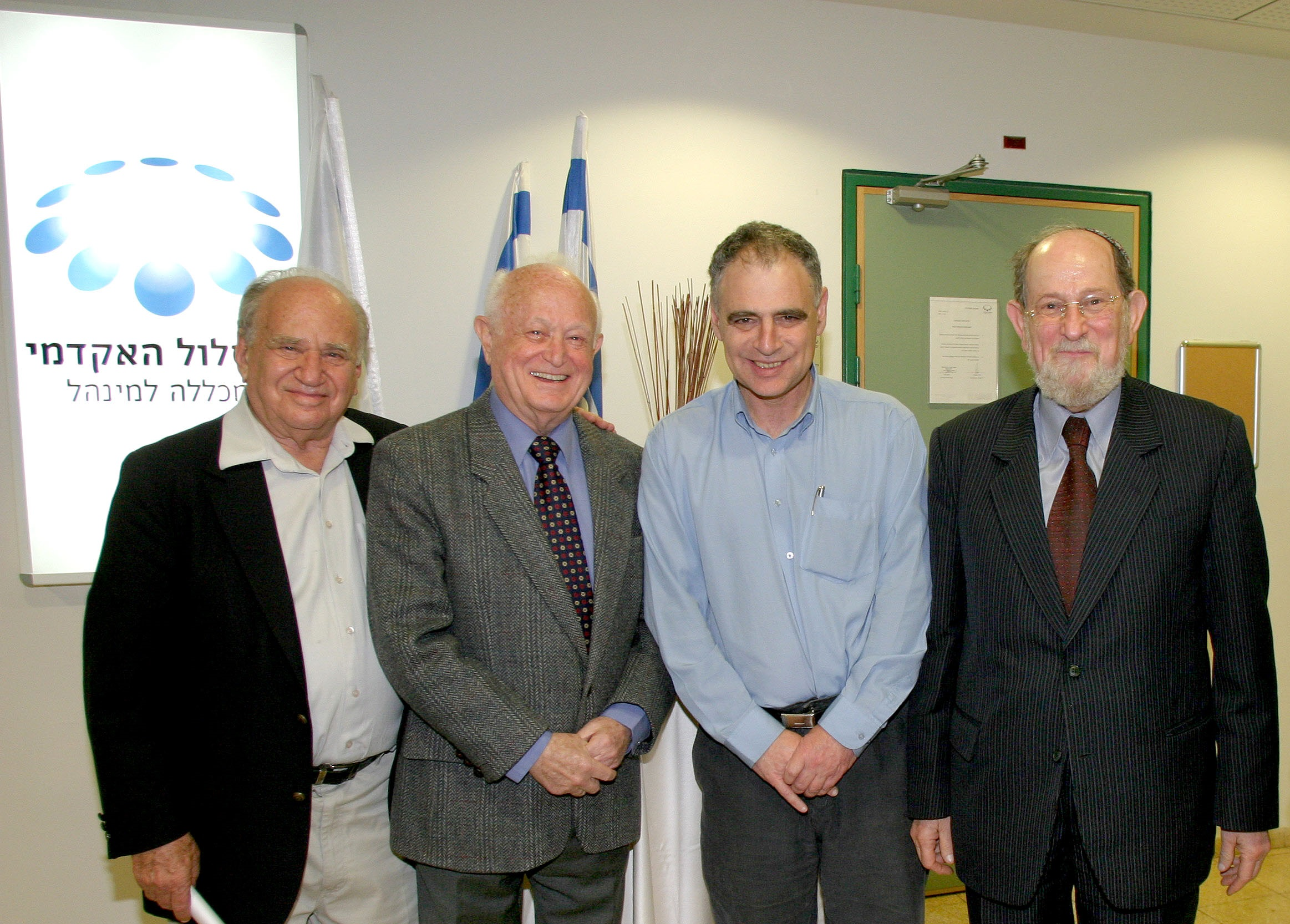
A conference held at the College of Management. From left to right: Aryeh Eliav, Moshe Sanbar, Prof. Yoram Eden, Rabbi Menachem Hacohen.

In the years 1972–1995 he served as chairman of the board of trustees of The College of Management Academic Studies. In 1978, the College was accredited by the Council for Higher Education as a formal institute of higher education, handed to Sanbar by Minister of Education Zevulun Hammer. In addition to his role in the board of trustees, in the years 1983-1989 he was also chairman of the executive.

Over the years he was a member of the executive at Tel Aviv University and the Technion, also sitting on the board of trustees of the Hebrew University, Bezalel Academy of Arts and Design and various other academic institutes.

Over the years Sanbar was also a member of faculty, teaching statistics in the Hebrew University (1957–61) and as a lecturer on economic research and policy in the Higher School for Law and Economics (1959). Later, he was made a visiting professor of economics at Tel Aviv University (1977–79). In 1971, he was among the founders of the Foerder Institute of Economic Research at Tel Aviv University.

Between 1974 and 1979 he was president of the Association of Graduates in Social Sciences and Humanities.

==== Welfare of Holocaust survivors and Holocaust remembrance ====
Since 1987 Sanbar was active in various national and international organizations working for the benefit of Holocaust survivors. He was a founding member in 1987 of the Umbrella Organization for Holocaust Survivors in Israel and appointed as its chairman (1987–2003) and later as its honorary president (2003-2011). In 2011 he resumed his position as chairman following the death of his successor Noah Flug.

Under Sanbar's leadership, in 1992 the umbrella organization began being officially represented within the institutions of the Claims Conference, himself having been elected to serve as international treasurer of the Claims Conference (1992–2001) and later as chairman of the executive (2002–2006). Following many years of consensus that no further reparations be claimed from the Government of Germany, the subject was reopened and the umbrella organization was successful in claiming reparations to new groups of victims, such as survivors from Eastern Europe and later on in negotiating compensations for survivors of forced labor camps. One of Sanbar's achievements within the Claims Conference was in passing a resolution that set a general expenditure policy with 80% allocated to holocaust survivors in need and the remaining 20% allocated towards educational, research and commemorative projects. In Israel, Sanbar reached agreement with the Claims Conference for establishing the Foundation for the Welfare of Holocaust Victims.

Sanbar was among the founders of the World Jewish Restitution Organization and in 2000 published a research book titled “Holocaust Gold From The Victims to Switzerland: The Paths of the Nazi Plunder”. He sat on various international commissions and forums concerning property restitutions: a Swiss National Committee on Needy Holocaust Survivors the International Commission on Holocaust Era Insurance Claims (1998–2007) and the Hungarian Inter-ministerial Committee for Restitution. In 2011, he was appointed as honorary member of the European Shoah Legacy Institute, a title given to only six individuals including Czech President Václav Havel and Nobel laureate Elie Wiesel.

In Israel, Sanbar was involved with most institutions for commemoration of the hcolocaust. He was chairman of the board of trustees at Massuah Institute for Holocaust Studies and a member of the council of Yad Vashem. On Israel's 50th anniversary in 1998, he was the main speaker at the annual memorial service opening the events of Yom HaShoah at Yad Vashem. In 2005, he was appointed as chairman of the national council focused on the contribution of holocaust survivors to the development of the State of Israel.

=== Later years and death ===
Sanbar dedicated most of his later years to the various committees and organizations concerning the welfare of holocaust survivors, both in Israel and internationally. In the years 2002 to 2008 he was also chairman of Neuromuscular Electrical Stimulation Systems Ltd.

In 2008, he advised minister Rafi Eitan in the creation of an emergency plan for providing a safety net to pension funds in Israel.

During the 2009 Israeli legislative election, Sanbar was the closing name in the list of nominees of Gil Party.

In 2010, Sanbar's biography was printed in a Hebrew book titled Signed on the Bill: An Economist in a Political World.

At the time of his death in 2012 he was chairman of Rosenrauch Foundation, chairman of the public council of the Yiddishpiel Theatre and honorary president of ICC Israel, Janco-Dada Museum and the Umbrella Organization of Holocaust Survivors in Israel.

Sanbar died on October 1, 2012, in Tel Aviv. He was buried the following day at Kiryat Shaul Cemetery. Among those who spoke during the service were Rabbi Israel Meir Lau, Karnit Flug, Julius Berman, Colette Avital, Rafi Eitan and others.

== Honors and recognition ==
Sanbar was the recipient of many awards and honors: Herzl Prize for his public activity (1973), Honorary citizenship of Pueblo, Colorado (1978), Ministry of Interior Award for his special contribution to the municipalities in Israel (1986), the Special Humanitarian Award by B'nai B'rith Organization (1995), Honorary Doctorate by Bar-Ilan University (2000), Israeli Chamber of Commerce honor for lifetime achievements (2004), the Light Award by the Fund for the Welfare of Holocaust Survivors (2012), Honorary citizenship of Metula (1973), distinguished citizen of Tel Aviv (2000), and many others.

In 2004 he was awarded the Order of Merit of the Republic of Hungary, the highest civil decoration bestowed in Hungary.

In 2003, the College of Management in Israel honored him by establishing the Moshe Sanbar Institute for Applied Economic Research. In honor of its dedication and of Sanbar, a book was also published marking 50 years of Israeli economy.

Posthumously, the Claims Conference dedicated a building in his name at the Dorot Medical Center.

Sanbar's archive is found at the Israel State Archives and Massuah Institute of Holocaust Studies.

== Authored books ==
Sanbar authored many researches and articles on economic policy, taxation, division of income and other monetary issues. He was also the writer and editor of several books in English:

- My Longest Year: In the Hungarian Labour Service and in the Nazi camps. Yad Vashem. 1968.
- Economic and Social Policy in Israel. UPA. 1989. ISBN 978-0819174994.
- Holocaust Gold From The Victims to Switzerland: The Paths of the Nazi Plunder. Moreshet. 2000. ISBN 978-9657026427.
