= Flug =

Flug is a surname. Notable people with the surname include:

- Karnit Flug (born 1955), Polish-born Israeli economist and government official
- Noach Flug (1925–2011), Israeli economist and diplomat
- Vasily Flug (1860–1955), Russian army general
