= Chase Manhattan Bank NA v Israel-British Bank (London) Ltd =

1981 English trusts law case

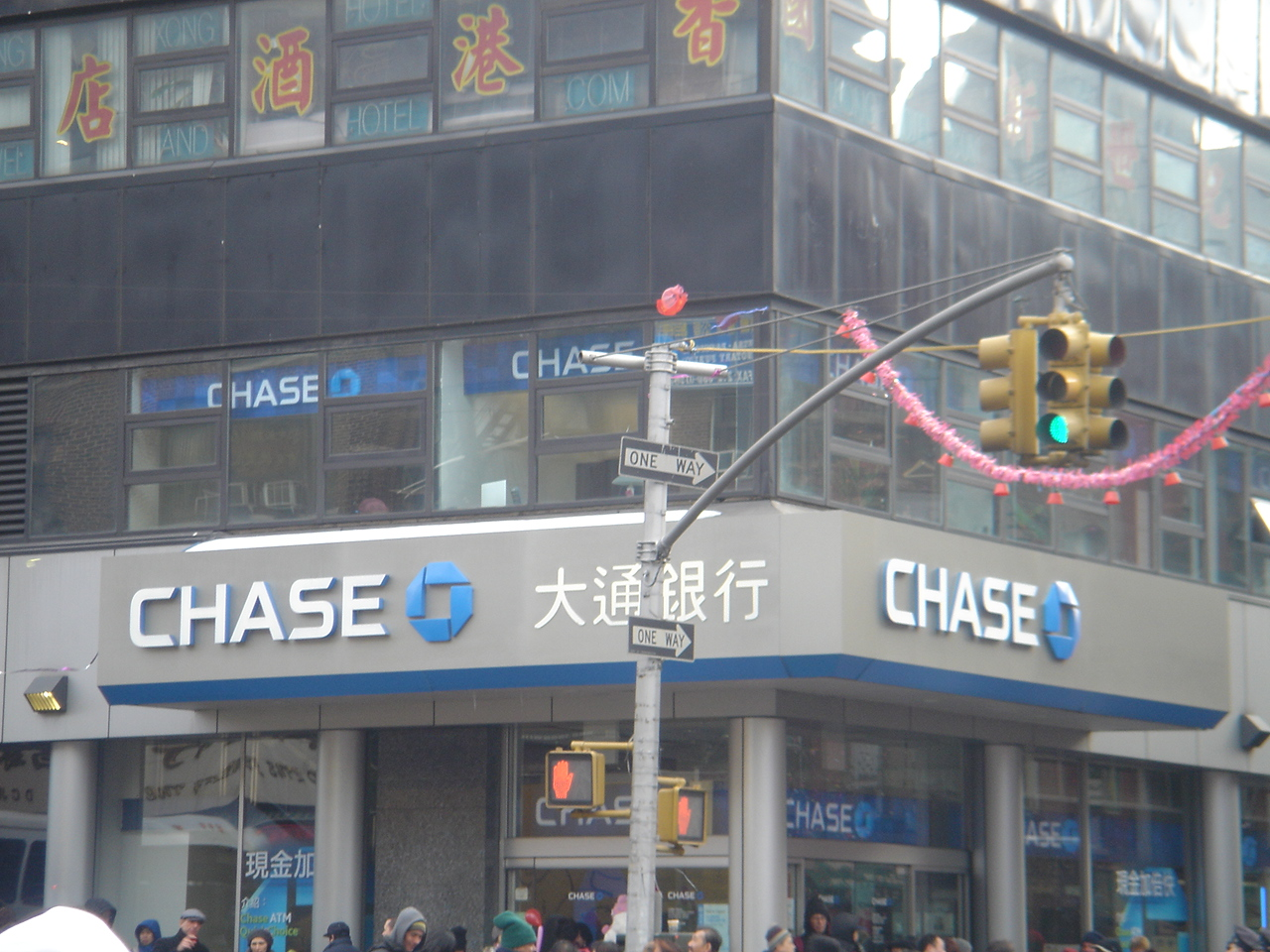
- Court: High Court
- Citation: [1981] Ch 105

Court membership
- Judge sitting: Goulding J

Keywords
- Constructive trust; Mistaken payment; Proprietary claim

Chase Manhattan Bank NA v Israel-British Bank (London) Ltd [1981] Ch 105 is an English trusts law case, concerning constructive trusts. It held that a trust arose to protect a payment made under a mistake, with the benefit of a proprietary remedy. This is seen important for the question of what response, personal or proprietary, may come from a claim in unjust enrichment.

As a matter of the conflict of laws, the court held that New York law was the proper law to determine if the payor retained an equitable interest in the sums paid by mistake, and that this was a substantive rule rather than a procedural one.

The decision in the case has been subjected to "sustained, authoritative criticism", both academically and judicially.

== Facts ==
Chase Manhattan was instructed to pay $2m to the Israel-British Bank, but it paid the sum twice by mistake. The Israel-British Bank subsequently became insolvent and entered into liquidation after Yehoshua Ben-Zion, the managing director, was convicted of embezzling £20 million ($39.4 million) from the bank. Chase Manhattan wished to claim back the money which it had mistakenly paid. However, because the Israel-British Bank was now insolvent, rather than make a claim for a dividend in the liquidation, where it would have to compete with all of the other creditors of the insolvent bank, Chase Manhattan sought to argue that the entire sums were held on trust and so should be returned as part of a proprietary claim to the money.

The Israel-British bank had known about the mistake on the part of Chase Manhattan before it went into liquidation.

== Judgment ==
Goulding J held that Chase Manhattan could recover the full sum, because the money was held on trust from the moment it was received. He said the following.

In the circumstances, however, the depositors retained an equitable property in the funds they parted with, and fiduciary relationships arose between them and the directors. In the same way, I would suppose, a person who pays money to another under a factual mistake retains an equitable property in it and the conscience of that other is subjected to a fiduciary duty to respect his proprietary right. I am fortified in my opinion by the speech of Viscount Haldane L.C. in Sinclair v Brougham [1914] AC 398, 419, 420, who, unlike Lord Dunedin, was not suspected of heresy in In re Diplock.

[...]

Little evidence has been adduced to show how a court in New York would classify or characterise for the purposes of private international law those provisions of its own law which have been under scrutiny in this case. It is not necessary for me to make a finding on the point, and I do not feel I have the materials to make one de bene esse. I have on the other hand heard a good deal of argument, and I have been referred to a number of authorities, regarding the characterisation of the same provisions of New York law by an English court. It is unnecessary, and therefore undesirable, for me to express any opinion on that question. I have held, after examining In re Diplock [1948] Ch. 465, that under English municipal law a party who pays money under a mistake of fact may claim to trace it in equity, and that this right depends on a continuing right of property recognised in equity. I have found, on the evidence presented by the parties, that a similar right to trace is conferred by New York municipal law, and that there too the party paying by mistake retains a beneficial interest in the assets. No doubt the two systems of law in this field are not in all respects identical, but if my conclusions are right no conflict has arisen between them in the present case, and there is no occasion to draw a line, on either side of the Atlantic, between provisions that belong to substantive law and provisions that belong to adjective law. The difficulties of defining the distinction and of applying it in various legal contexts appear in several well known authorities, e.g. in the judgment of Atkin L.J. in The Colorado [1923] P. 102, 110-112, and in the speech of Lord Pearson in Boys v Chaplin [1971] A.C. 356, 394, 395. It would be wrong for me, merely in recognition of counsel's industry, for which I am nonetheless grateful, to make observations obiter on so important a subject.

== Criticism ==
The decision has been subject to "sustained, authoritative criticism."

The case was reviewed in Westdeutsche Landesbank Girozentrale v Islington LBC by Lord Browne-Wilkinson, and expressed doubts as to the reasoning. He stated "I cannot agree with this reasoning. First, it is based on a concept of retaining an equitable property in money where, prior to payment to the recipient bank, there was no existing equitable interest. Further, I cannot understand how the recipient's conscience can be affected at a time when he is not aware of any mistake." This view, expressed by way of obiter dictum, was particularly criticised by Peter Birks on the ground that the more straightforward way to establish a claim would be for unjust enrichment, should trigger a proprietary remedy in a similar circumstance, regardless of the position of one's notional conscience.

Lord Millett, writing extrajudicially, has also criticised the decision, stating "It is easy to agree with Lord Browne-Wilkinson that [Chase Manhattan v Israel-British Bank] was wrongly decided, but it was wrongly decided not because [the transferee] had no notice of the [transferor's] claim ... but because the [claimant] had no proprietary interest for it to have notice of."

Most of this criticism relates to the views expressed that, if the proper law to determine the issues had been English law, that the proprietary claim was valid. But the case was contested on the basis that both parties to the proceedings accepted that the proper law to determine this issue was New York law.

== See also ==
- English land law
- English property law
- English trusts law
