= Amir Yaron =

Economist, Governor of the Bank of Israel

- אמיר ירון
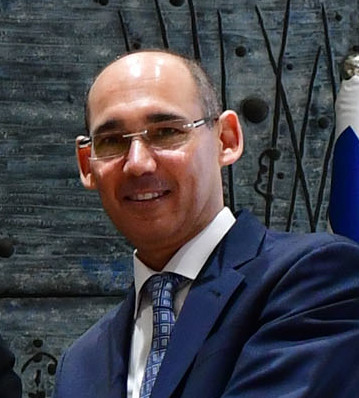

10th Governor of the Bank of Israel
- Incumbent
- Assumed office December 24, 2018
- Prime Minister: Benjamin Netanyahu; Naftali Bennett; Yair Lapid
- Preceded by: Karnit Flug

Personal details
- Born: 1964 (age 61–62) Tel Aviv, Israel
- Education: Tel Aviv University; University of Chicago
- Occupation: Economist

Amir Yaron (Hebrew: אמיר ירון; born 1964) is an Israeli-American economist and the current Governor of the Bank of Israel. Prior to serving as Governor, Yaron served as Professor of Banking and Finance at the Wharton School, University of Pennsylvania.

== Early life ==
Amir Yaron was born in Israel in 1964. He grew up in Ramat HaSharon and Ramat Gan, and studied at the Ussishkin School. His father Yaakov was an economist who worked at Bank Hapoalim, and later served in a number of senior management positions in Israeli industry. He then took a position at the World Bank, where he specialized in emerging economies. As a result of this position, the family moved to the United States. Yaron's mother was a teacher and a psychologist.

Between 1985 and 1989, Yaron served in the Israel Defense Forces as an officer under the economic advisor to the IDF Chief of Staff. Due to his family's move to the United States, Yaron was considered a lone soldier. Following his service, he was discharged with the rank of captain. He holds bachelor's and master's degrees in economics from Tel Aviv University, the latter of which he completed with distinction in 1989. He completed a second master's degree from the University of Chicago in 1992, and received a Ph.D. from the University of Chicago in 1994. Yaron's doctoral thesis was completed under the guidance of Lars Peter Hansen, later the winner of the 2013 Nobel Prize in Economics.

== Academic career ==
Yaron was assistant professor of economics and finance at Carnegie Mellon University from 1994 until 1997. In 1997, he was appointed to the academic staff of The Wharton School at the University of Pennsylvania. In 2004, he was appointed associate professor, and in 2009 he was appointed Robert Morris Professor of Banking and professor of finance. Yaron's main areas of research are asset pricing, investment, finance, international markets and international business, and macroeconomics. He also served as a research associate at the National Bureau of Economic Research (NBER), where he headed the capital markets and economics group. In addition, Prof. Yaron served as a visiting academic at the Federal Reserve Bank of Philadelphia.

== Economic achievements ==
Yaron is a researcher in financial economics, and studies microfinancing, asset pricing, and investments. He is in the field of finance, and has published articles in academic journals in economics and finance. As a lecturer, Yaron worked in the field of international investment and multinational corporations.

On October 28, 2019, Yaron received the Stephen A. Ross Prize in financial economics from the Foundation for the Advancement of Research in Financial Economics (FARFE) for his work on asset pricing. The award-winning study by Prof. Yaron and Prof. Ravi Bansal was published in The Journal of Finance in 2004, when Yaron was a researcher at the University of Pennsylvania. In the study, the authors found a solution to a common phenomenon in economics known as the "Excess Equity Yield Puzzle"—a higher multiyear return on equities than on bonds and a number of other anomalies in the finance and asset pricing literature. In their study, the authors found that changes in yields on equities and on bonds are partly caused by changes in the perception of long-term macroeconomic risks that threaten economic growth, and by changes in economic uncertainty.

In the explanation for the prize, the prize committee wrote that the research makes a fundamental contribution to central questions in asset pricing and in a diverse set of areas in both finance and macroeconomics. Among other things, this paper helped provide an understanding of the situation that led to the 2008 financial crisis, and laid a solid scientific groundwork for the inclusion of various factors that influence the public's savings and consumption. Those factors include concerns over global crisis situations such as trade wars, changes in economic policy due to political changes, and global warming. Since the article was published, it has been cited many times in economic studies, scientific publications, and articles, including a document by the Nobel Prize Committee in 2013, which noted that the Bansal-Yaron model had a deep effect on many later studies, including those of that year's Nobel Prize winner, Lars Peter Hansen.

Prof. Yaron has also written important studies in the fields of macroeconomics and public policy. He was among the first contributors to the macroeconomic literature on models that include a large number of consumers and heterogeneous firms, and he also wrote studies dealing with inequality, consumerism, human capital, unemployment, earning capacity, national welfare programs, and more.

Yaron studied macroeconomic risks to the financial system. Despite his lack of experience with regard to Israel's monetary policy, Yaron was chosen to serve as Bank of Israel Governor in view of his expertise in finance and macroeconomics.

== Bank of Israel Governor ==
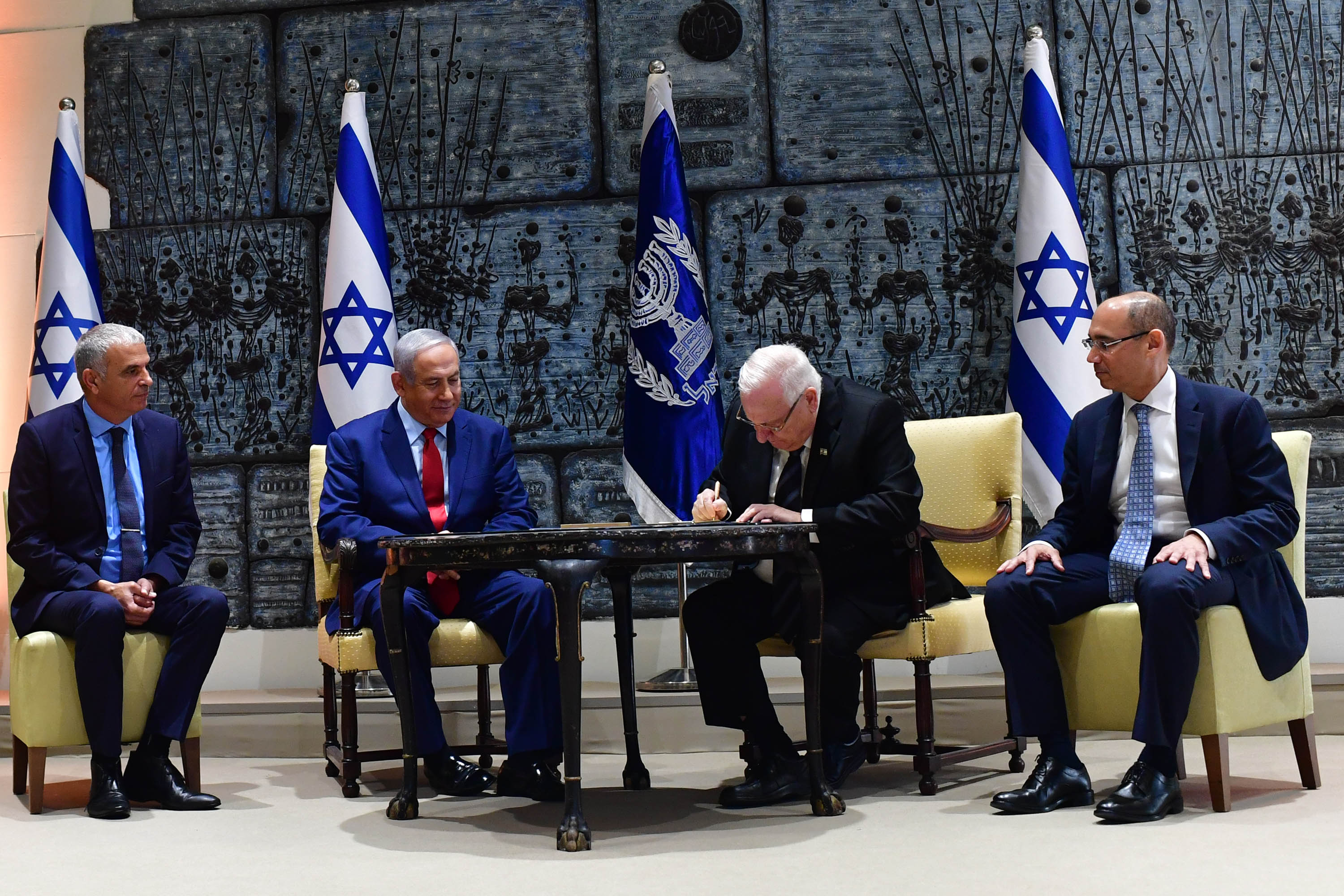
The President of Israel, Reuven Rivlin, signing a letter of appointment of the incoming Governor of the Bank of Israel, Prof. Amir Yaron. December 24, 2018. In the background is an Israeli volcanic ash artwork.

On October 9, 2018, Prof. Amir Yaron was chosen by Prime Minister Benjamin Netanyahu to be the next governor of the Bank of Israel, subject to government approval. He succeeded Karnit Flug, whose five-year term ended in November, 2018. Nadine Baudot-Trajtenberg served as acting governor from November 2018 until he assumed office on December 24, 2018.

In his speech upon taking the position, which took place at the official residence of Israel's President, Yaron pointed to the normalization of monetary policy as an immediate challenge facing the Bank of Israel at the time, and emphasized that the interest rate is the main tool in setting out the direction of monetary policy. He also emphasized the urgent need for broad investment in infrastructure and in human capital that was required to realize the economy's growth potential. Prof. Yaron noted financial innovation as a field that would increase competition and improve the Israeli financial system.

On January 7, 2019, Yaron announced that in consultation with the Bank's Monetary Committee, it was decided to leave the interest rate unchanged at 0.25%. This followed the Monetary Committee's decision of November 26, 2018, before he took the position, to raise the interest rate to 0.25% after it had been at 0.1% for three years. The announcement accompanying the January 7 decision stated that in the coming two years, a gradual and cautious increase in the interest rate was expected with the aim of stabilizing inflation.

In June 2019, Governor Yaron warned of an increase in the budget deficit and of a worsening of the debt to GDP ratio. The Governor added that the government would have no choice but to raise taxes and cancel existing exemptions.

In August 2019, the Bank of Israel published a comprehensive report on Israel's low labor productivity (relative to other OECD countries), which contained operative recommendations for the government in the areas of education, regulation, infrastructure, and more. The report stated that the main way to raise the standard of living in Israel is by increasing labor productivity. Among other things, the report recommended synchronizing the school week with parents’ work week, partly by cancelling school on Fridays, as well as strengthening investment in professional training for Haredi (ultra-Orthodox) men. According to the report, investment of NIS 42 billion in increasing labor productivity would create a long-term benefit of about NIS 270 billion. In September 2019, Yaron announced that he had instructed the Bank of Israel Research Department to formulate operative recommendations in the field of housing, and that the Bank would begin a process of defining strategic targets for the coming years.

In his first year as Governor, Yaron left the interest rate at 0.25%, despite analysts' assessments that he would lower it to 0.1%. Yaron referred to the Bank of Israel's policy in the foreign exchange market as "constructive ambiguity", which, in his view, was the appropriate policy for a small economy such as Israel.

At the beginning of the COVID-19 pandemic, Yaron led the Bank of Israel in adopting new monetary and other tools that had not been used since the 2008 financial crisis, to an unprecedented scale. The objectives of these measures were to ensure the proper functioning of the financial markets, deal with liquidity difficulties that the financial system was experiencing, ease the terms of credit in the economy, and support economic activity and financial stability. In this framework, the Bank of Israel used a variety of tools, some of which were precedent-setting, beyond lowering the interest rate to its lowest rate in history (0.1%). These included injecting liquidity into the bond market by making repo transactions with bonds as collateral; supporting the foreign exchange market through dollar/shekel swaps; helping to increase the supply of credit to small and micro businesses by providing designated loans to the banking system; and reducing the cost of credit in the economy by purchasing government and corporate bonds.

At the beginning of the crisis, Governor Yaron called on the banking system to find the proper balance so that the banks could continue providing for the economy's financing needs, particularly those of households and small and micro businesses, even under the unique crisis conditions. As a direct result, the Bank of Israel and the banking system took steps to make it easier for customers, including a program to delay loan repayments.

In addition, the Bank of Israel adopted a number of regulatory measures such as lowering capital requirements for the commercial banks by one percentage point, in order to increase the sources of credit in the economy and in view of the high increase in demand for credit since the outbreak of the crisis.

As the Economic Advisor the Government, Governor Yaron emphasized throughout the crisis that in view of the uniqueness of the crisis, significant fiscal steps were necessary even at the cost of increasing the deficit and government debt. In this context, Yaron supported, and was involved with, the design and advancement of a budgetary safety net, measures to help businesses that had been negatively impacted by the crisis, and the implementation of programs to help employment. Yaron noted the importance of planning these steps as part of a proper State budget, and emphasized the importance of passing the budget in a message that was also aimed at the international markets in which Israel raises debt.

With the establishment of Israel's 36th government in May 2021, the Bank of Israel submitted a strategic economic program to accelerate the economy and a fiscal framework for financing them. The program was built along four strategic pillars: improving human capital, improving infrastructure and physical investment, development of the financial markets, and improvement of digitization and regulation in the public sector.

One of the issues that Governor Yaron emphasized upon taking office, and which he has worked to advance, was closing Israel's gap in the world of advanced payments. Since then, the EMV standard has been introduced, leading to the entry of ApplePay, the increased use of digital wallets, and the completion of contactless transactions.

Due to the increase in inflation in Israel and in other countries, the Bank of Israel interest rate was increased a number of times in 2022, with the sharpest increase coming in August, when it was raised 0.75 percentage points to 2%.

As a result of the interest rate increases, the commercial banks applied the full increase to consumer loans, but raised interest rates on deposits only slightly.

At the end of August 2022, the Bank of Israel launched a mortgage reform, as part of which the banks were required to present mortgage offers in a uniform structure, so that it would be easier for consumers to choose the cheapest and most appropriate option.

During the discussions on the Levin Judicial Reform, Governor Yaron criticized it and said, "The changes being made to the legislation may have a negative impact on the independence of Israel’s institutions. Moreover, the process itself is rushed, and is being pursued without the broad agreement of the public".

Shortly after the outbreak of Gaza war on October 7, 2023, the Bank of Israel has launched multiple programs aimed at stabilizing the economy. One major program was the bank's announcement of selling of up to 30 billion dollars in foreign exchange. In parallel, the BOI, promoted a unified program by the commercial banks offering loan and mortgage deferrals to the victims and reserve persons.

As a representative of the State of Israel, in the days following the outbreak of the war, the Governor addressed the international economic community at conferences in which he gave speeches and presentations, and provided details about the situation in Israel. Those conferences included some of the most prominent figures in the economic world, such as the Chairman of the Federal Reserve, Jerome Powell, the President of the ECB, Christine Lagrade, and the General Manager of the BIS, Agustín Carstens.

On November 20, Prime Minister Benjamin Netanyahu and Minister of Finance Bezalel Smotrich agreed on extending Yaron's term for 5 more years, and on November 27 the cabinet approved the nomination.

In January 2024, he lowered the interest rate by 0.25% and it was at 4.5%. This was the first interest rate cut since the Bank of Israel reduced the interest rate during the COVID-19 pandemic in April 2020 by 0.25% to 0.1%. The interest rate remained at this level until April 2022, when, following the increase of the inflation, the Bank of Israel began a series of consecutive interest rate increases against the background of an increase in inflation, until it was set at 4.75% at May 2023.

On the 24th of November 2025, the BOI Monetary Committee decided to lower the interest rate again by 0.25 percentage points, to 4.25%.

== Comments on judicial reform as the governor of the Bank of Israel ==
During discussions on legal reform, Yaron, as the Governor of the Bank of Israel, consistently voiced his concerns about unilateral legislative changes and cautioned against potential adverse consequences for Israel's economy if such changes were pursued without broad consensus. He emerged as one of the most influential figures in the debate on legal reform, particularly regarding its economic aspects. Yaron, a prominent figure in his field, took a clear stance against extensive changes to the legal system if they infringe on the strength and independence of Institutions and be without widespread political support.

Yaron reiterated his position in various settings, including interviews with Israeli and international media. In these interviews, he expressed that the legislative process was rushed and lacked broad public approval. Even during regular press conferences hosted by the Bank of Israel, the governor discussed the potential impact of legal reform. He stated, "In the event that the public's perception...is that the impact of the legislative changes will persist, the damage is estimated at about 2.8% of GDP on average for each year over the next three years". Yaron's opposition to the way the reform was promoted, combined with the Bank of Israel's interest rate increases under his leadership at the time, resulted in criticism and attacks from coalition members.

== Personal life ==
Amir Yaron lived in the United States from the 1990s until he returned to Israel in 2018. He is married and has two children.

Yaron's residency in the United States for 20 years before his appointment led to various reactions. There were those who wondered about how appropriate it was to appoint a foreign resident to such a senior position, while there were others who saw it as an opportunity to strengthen the country's connection with Israeli citizens living abroad.

== Other activities ==
- International Monetary Fund (IMF), Ex-Officio Member of the Board of Governors (since 2018)
- Aaron Dovrat Institute for Economic Policy at Herzliya Interdisciplinary Center, Member of the Board
- Foundation for the Advancement of Research in Financial Economics, Member

== Publications ==
- 2001 Eduardo Jallath, Tridas Mukhopadhyay, Sandra Slaughter and Amir Yaron: "The Economic Value of Network Externalities In an Electronic Payment Network: An Empirical Evaluation"
- 2001 Ravi Bansal and Amir Yaron: "Growth Rate Dynamics and the Cost of Economic Fluctuations"
- 2004 Ravi Bansal and Amir Yaron: "Risks for the Long Run: A Potential Resolution of Asset Pricing Puzzles"
