= Ravi Bansal =

Economist and an academic

- Occupation: Economist

Academic background
- Education: B.A. (hons) and M.A., Economics; Ph.D., Economics
- Alma mater: Delhi University, India; Carnegie Mellon University

Ravi Bansal is an economist and an academic. He is J.B. Fuqua Professor at the Fuqua School of Business at Duke University and Research Associate at the National Bureau of Economic Research. He is most known for his research work in the fields of financial economics and macroeconomics.

== Research ==
=== Recognition of asset pricing research ===
His work on the Long Run Risk Model provided new insights on the role of long-run growth and uncertainty as key drivers of asset prices. This work was acknowledged, and cited in the background article for the 2013 Nobel Prize in Economics.

Among other awards, in 2019, his paper, Risks for the long run: A potential resolution of asset pricing puzzles (with Amir Yaron) won the Stephen A. Ross Prize in Financial Economics from Foundation for Advancement of Research in Financial Economics (FARFE). His related long-run risks research papers with Robert Dittmar and Christian Lundblad and with Dana Kiku established that cash-flow exposures with respect to long-term growth account for a large fraction of the long-run risk-premia on assets.

=== Predictability and liquidity of assets ===
With Ivan Shaliastovich, his paper A Long-Run Risks Explanation of Predictability Puzzles in Bond and Currency Markets connects the long-run growth risks to inflation dynamics to explain the term structure of bond yields and exchange rates. With Hengjie Ai his paper Risk Preferences and the Macroeconomic Announcement Premium provides the theoretical foundations for large announcement day returns in asset markets. A Monetary Explanation of the Equity Premium, Term Premium, and the Risk-Free Rate Puzzles co-authored with John Coleman provides a model of liquidity (moneyness of assets), convenience yields, and the term structure of interest rates. Furthermore, his research spans issues related to impact of long-run risks on macro fluctuations and the connections between long-run growth and climate change.

== Posts ==
Bansal currently holds the position of J.B. Fuqua Professor at the Fuqua School of Business at Duke University and Research Associate at the National Bureau of Economic Research.

== Awards and honors ==
- 2004 – Smith-Breeden Distinguished Paper Award for ‘’Risks for the Long Run: A Potential Resolution of Asset Pricing Puzzles’’, The American Finance Association
- 2019 – Stephen A. Ross Prize in Financial Economics, Foundation for Advancement of Research in Financial Economics (FARFE)

== Selected articles ==
- Bansal, R., & Coleman, W. J. (1996). A monetary explanation of the equity premium, term premium, and risk-free rate puzzles. Journal of political Economy, 104(6), 1135–1171.
- Bansal, R., & Yaron, A. (2004). Risks for the long run: A potential resolution of asset pricing puzzles. The Journal of Finance, 59(4), 1481–1509.
- Bansal, R., Dittmar, R. F., & Lundblad, C. T. (2005). Consumption, dividends, and the cross section of equity returns. The Journal of Finance, 60(4), 1639–1672.
- Bansal, R., Dittmar, R., & Kiku, D. (2009). Cointegration and consumption risks in asset returns. The Review of Financial Studies, 22(3), 1343–1375.
- Ai, H., & Bansal, R. (2018). Risk preferences and the macroeconomic announcement premium. Econometrica, 86(4), 1383–1430.
- Bansal, R., Wu, D., & Yaron, A. (2022). Socially responsible investing in good and bad times. The Review of Financial Studies, 35(4), 2067–2099.
