= Bank of Israel =

Monetary authority of Israel

Coordinates: 31°46′53″N 35°12′04″E

Bank of Israel בנק ישראל

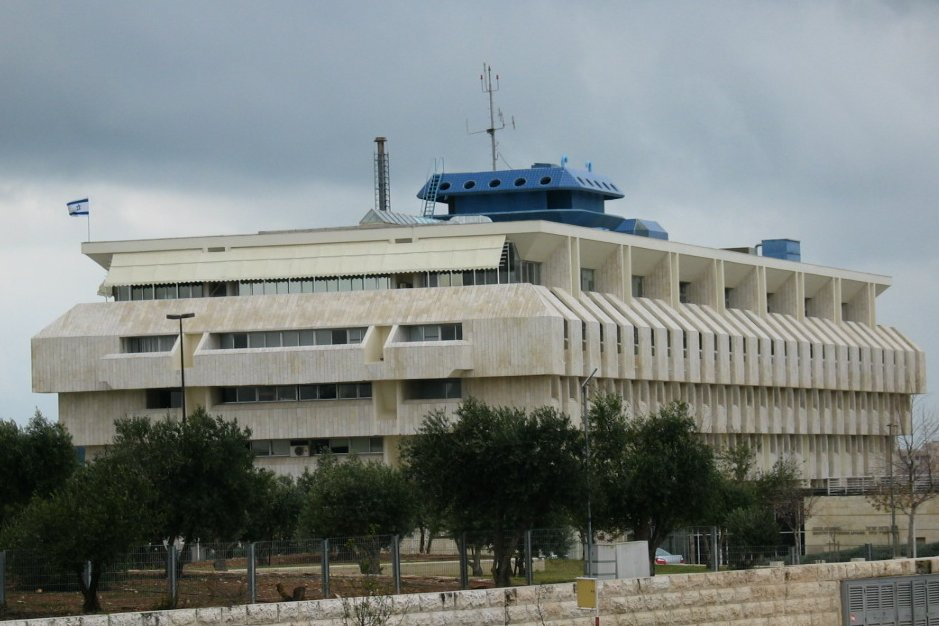
- Central bank of: Israel
- Headquarters: (Israel) Kiryat HaMemshala, Jerusalem
- Established: 24 August 1954
- Ownership: Government of Israel (Ministry of Finance)
- Governor: Amir Yaron (2018-present)
- Currency: New Israeli shekel ILS (ISO 4217)
- Reserves: US$206 billion (about ₪664 billion) (March 2022)
- Bank rate: 4.5% (April 2023)
- Preceded by: Bank Leumi Le-Israel
- Website: boi.org.il

The Bank of Israel (Hebrew: בנק ישראל, Arabic: بنك إسرائيل) is the central bank of Israel. The bank's headquarters is located in Kiryat HaMemshala in Jerusalem with a branch office in Tel Aviv. The current governor is Amir Yaron.

The primary objective of the Bank of Israel is to maintain stability in prices and the financial system in Israel. It also administers and implements monetary policy in Israel, conducts foreign exchange operations, supervises and regulates the banking system, takes care of the foreign reserves and operations of the financial market infrastructure. The Bank of Israel has, under Article 41 and 44 of its Statute, the exclusive right to issue Israeli Shekel banknotes and coins.

== History ==
=== Establishment and early years ===
When Israel gained independence in 1948, the power of note issuance was vested with the Anglo-Palestine Bank, which was refounded as Bank Leumi in 1950. This was done due to the urgency at the time to produce notes. Monetary policy and banking supervision remained controlled by the Ministry of Finance.

Since a central bank is considered a must in modern countries, in March 1951, a committee was founded called the "committee to establish a state bank". In the committee were Eliezer Kaplan, Levi Eshkol and others. The committee sent its secretary to the United States to study the way state banks function as well as advised ask the UN for expert advisors. The committee established the aim for the bank to be the stabilization of the currency, the keeping of high levels of production, employment and earnings.

The foreign experts advised to grant the bank of Israel a standing independent from the ministry of finance, in order to avoid political influences on decisions and the handing out of debt to different sectors. It was advised the bank would be managed by committee members representing the various sectors in the Israeli public. The monetary committee of the Knesset preferred that the bank be run by the governor alone who would be under governmental supervision, that way the bank could prove an effective way to guide the financial markets of the country. In the end it was decided to grant the central bank limited independence, but according to the law it was obligated to cover government expenditure when needed. In 2010, the law was changed and since the Bank of Israel has full independence in setting its monetary policy.

The Bank of Israel was founded on 24 August 1954, when the Knesset passed the Bank of Israel Law, which ceded the currency issuing and regulatory functions of the Ministry of Finance to the newly formed bank. Control over foreign currency exchange was not given to the bank until 1978. The bank was made completely independent in 1985 and since 1992, the bank manages its monetary policy so as to meet the inflation target set by the Israeli government - which is today a range of between 1 and 3 percent per annum, considered as price stability. Additionally, the bank manages the country's Foreign Exchange Reserves.

The bank began operating under the management of its first governor, David Horowitz. The department responsible for issuing banknotes was transferred to the Bank of Israel, which later became the currency department, and the unit for supervising banks from the Ministry of Finance, which also became a department in the bank. Over time, additional units and departments were established in the bank, including the monetary department, the foreign currency supervision department (transferred to the bank in 1978), the foreign currency department, and the research department.

One of the factors that led to the accelerated decision to establish a central bank was the government's difficulty in supervising credit allocation and the lack of oversight over the banking system. Until the establishment of the bank, the bank supervision department was a small division within the Ministry of Finance, lacking the tools to oversee the complex banking system, which included dozens of banking institutions and cooperative credit societies scattered geographically throughout Israel. Through the establishment of a central bank, the government hoped to improve its control over the banking system and credit allocation. After the establishment of the Bank of Israel, the banking system underwent a process of consolidation, during which cooperative societies were merged into larger banks. This trend was encouraged by both the Bank of Israel and the government, as it facilitated government and bank control over credit allocation.

The establishment of the bank raised hopes for reducing government intervention in the economy and decreasing concentration, although in practice, the result was the opposite – increased government involvement. Some anticipated this development and sought to postpone the establishment of the Bank of Israel, but were unsuccessful.

=== The 1960s and 1970s ===
David Horowitz served as the bank's governor for 17 years. His tenure as governor was characterized in its early years by relative economic stability, rapid growth, and the absence of significant inflation until the early 1960s. In 1962, due to rising living standards and consumption leading to the danger of inflationary pressures (annual inflation reached 9%), wage increases, and a deficit in the balance of payments, a significant devaluation of the pound occurred in 1962 by Finance Minister Levi Eshkol, from 1.80 pounds to the dollar to 3 pounds to the dollar, a devaluation that did not solve the exposed problems. Following the devaluation and budget difficulties, the treasury shifted to an austere fiscal policy.

In 1966, the economy experienced a severe recession, and the Bank of Israel was forced to adapt its policy to such a situation for the first time. Among other things, three private banks collapsed: Bank Alran, Bank Poalei Agudat Israel, and Bank Credit, and the Bank intervened for the first time to protect depositors using its authority under Section 44 of the Bank of Israel Law.

In 1971, Moshe Zanbar replaced Horowitz was as governor of the central bank. The Bank of Israel faced unprecedented situations, such as rampant inflation (14% in 1972) and increased public spending following the Six-Day War. The Yom Kippur War and the ensuing energy crisis exacerbated economic problems, inflation, deficits in the balance of payments, and the pace of devaluations. In July 1974, the Bank of Israel intervened in Israel-British Bank and dismissed its management after criminal irregularities were found in the bank's management.

In 1976, Arnon Gafni took office as governor.

=== 1980s, crisis, introduction of New Israeli Shekel ===
In the year 1982, Moshe Mendelbaum was appointed governor. As governor he had to deal with the severe economic situation that the economy had fallen into due to rampant inflation. Simultaneously, he and the heads of the bank found themselves in one of the toughest economic crises in the history of the State of Israel - the 1983 bank stocks crisis. In the early eighties, inflation spiraled out of control, reaching peaks unprecedented in the country's history, and price hikes were a routine matter. In 1984, inflation peaked at 450%.

In 1984, a National Unity Government was established to tackle the rampant inflation. In 1985, a comprehensive new plan was adopted - the Economic Stabilization Plan, prepared by treasury officials with the assistance of prominent economists from academia, led by Prof. Michael Bruno, accompanied by renowned economists from abroad including Prof. Stanley Fischer. A significant amendment to the Bank of Israel Law was implemented, prohibiting the government from borrowing money from the bank to cover budget deficits, and the shekel was replaced with a new shekel by removing three zeros. The stabilization plan took into account components of a comprehensive rehabilitation plan, and its essence included: significant cuts in the government budget (mainly through noticeable reductions in subsidies and other government expenditures); a decrease in real wages (aimed at reducing local demand, increasing export competitiveness, and preventing severe unemployment growth); high interest rates and stabilization of the exchange rate at the new level for as long as possible; and freezing prices administratively for a limited period. As a result of the plan's implementation, which received full support from the government, inflation dropped to single digits (the amendment to the law greatly assisted in this), and the bank's position was significantly strengthened.

In 1986, Prof. Michael Bruno, one of the architects of the stabilization plan, was appointed governor of the bank. Further strengthening of the position of the Bank of Israel occurred after the publication of the findings of the Basle Committee in 1986 and the expansion of the Bank of Israel's powers as a supervisor of the banks. In 1978, supervision of foreign currency was transferred from the Ministry of Finance to the Bank of Israel. Subsequently, following a prolonged process of liberalization in the foreign currency market, supervision of foreign currency was finally abolished in 2003. The Department for Supervision of Foreign Currency became the "Department of Market Operations in Foreign Currency," which dealt with monitoring and researching the economy's activity against foreign countries and the foreign exchange market.

After the 1985 Economic Stabilization Plan, the bank's position was strengthened, mainly due to the amendment to the Bank of Israel Law, which prohibited the government from borrowing money from the bank to cover budget deficits.

=== 21st century ===
David Klein was appointed as the seventh governor in 2000 and continued the path of preceding governors: implemented monetary reforms, managed a tough monetary policy, initiated efforts to transfer authority over salary agreements to the Treasury, and liberalized the foreign currency market. During Klein's tenure, tensions rose in the field of labor relations. There was also conflict between the Bank of Israel and the Treasury regarding the salary agreements practiced in the Bank of Israel peaked. The background to the dispute was the Basic Budget Law, enacted with the stabilization plan in 1985, which stipulated that public bodies—including the bank—would be subject to this law. The Treasury alleged that the salary agreements in the Bank of Israel deviated from the norm in public service. In 2005, Stanley Fischer was appointed as the eighth governor. Fischer declared his intention to introduce a new law for the Bank of Israel to replace the 1954 law, regulating labor relations with the Treasury concerning salary agreements in the bank, and implementing structural reform in the bank. With the onset of the economic crisis in 2008, Fischer pursued a successful and internationally recognized policy: he adjusted interest rates rapidly (the first in the world to lower and raise interest rates), acquired foreign currency reserves, and purchased government bonds to reduce interest rates for long periods. In 2008, organizational changes were made in the bank, including the closure of the Foreign Exchange Operations Department (which formed the basis for the Information and Statistics Division), the Monetary Department (part of which was merged with the Foreign Exchange Department to create the Markets Division, and another part with the Research Department to create the Research Division), and the State Loans Administration. The bank's departments were reorganized into divisions.

In 2010, the Bank of Israel was ranked first among central banks for its efficient functioning, according to IMD's World Competitiveness Yearbook.

In March 2010, the Knesset approved a new Bank of Israel Law which took effect on 1 June 2010. The new law defines the goals of the bank and gives the bank independence in determining its policy tools and the way of implementing them. The law changed the framework in which major decisions are made at the Bank of Israel. Decisions regarding the interest rate and monetary policy, in general, are made by a Monetary Committee, while the managerial decisions are approved by a Supervisory Council. This brings the Bank of Israel more in line with the decision making procedures of other financial institutions.

In 2013, Dr. Karnit Flug was appointed as the governor of the bank. She continued her predecessors' policies both in deepening monetary control and in integrating Israel into the global economy.

In 2018, Professor Amir Yaron was appointed as the governor of the bank. During his tenure, the Bank of Israel provided approval for the establishment of two new banks in Israel: Bank One Zero and Bank Ash Israel.

== Buildings ==
The current headquarters in Jerusalem was designed by the architecture office of Arieh Sharon and his son, Eldar Sharon. They won the first prize for the project in 1966 and worked at the design until 1974. The building was inaugurated in 1981. The design resembles an inverted pyramid and was inspired by the Boston City Hall. The building underwent a major overhaul and renovation between 2015 and 2018.

== Governors ==
- David Horowitz, 1954–1971
- Moshe Sanbar, 1971–1976
- Arnon Gafni, 1976–1981
- Moshe Mendelbaum, 1982–1986
- Michael Bruno, 1986–1991
- Jacob A. Frenkel, 1991–2000
- David Klein, 2000–2005
- Stanley Fischer, 2005–2013
- Karnit Flug, 2013–2018
- Nadine Baudot-Trajtenberg, acting governor from 14 November until December 24, 2018.
- Amir Yaron, 2018–present

== See also ==
- Banking in Israel
- Economy of Israel
- List of banks in Israel
- List of central banks
