= Noach Flug =

- נח פלוג
- Born: Eljasz Noach Flug; 1 January 1925; Łódź, Poland
- Died: 11 August 2011 (aged 86); Jerusalem
- Occupations: Economist, diplomat and advocate for the rights of Holocaust survivors

Eliyahu Noach Flug (Hebrew: אליהו נח פלוג; 1 January 1925 – 11 August 2011) was an Israeli economist, diplomat and advocate for the rights of Holocaust survivors.

== Biography ==
Flug was born in Łódź, Poland to Rywka (née Gliksman) and Icek Flug. During the Second World War he was a resident of the Łódź Ghetto, from which he was transferred in 1944 to Auschwitz. In the last months of the war he was also sent to Gross-Rosen concentration camp and was rescued by the Allied forces while on a death march to Mauthausen.

In 1958, he made aliyah to Israel. An economist, Flug worked in the civil service for over 30 years. He worked at the Ministry of Finance and later appointed as a financial advisor to the Finance Committee of the Knesset and to the Israeli embassy in Bonn. Flug also served as the Israeli consul to Zürich.

Flug was a central advocate for the rights of Holocaust survivors. In 1987 he was a founding member of the Center of Organizations of Holocaust Survivors in Israel, an umbrella organization for about 70 bodies. After his retirement from the civil service he dedicated his time to these causes, serving as president of the International Auschwitz Committee, vice president of the Claims Conference and a member of the Yad Vashem executive board. For several years he served chairman of the Center of Organizations of Holocaust Survivors in Israel, reelected to the post a second time in June 2011.

Noach was married to Dorota Flug (née Tugendreich), they had two daughters, Anat Flug-Levin, a psychoanalyst, and Karnit Flug, former governor of the Central Bank of Israel. Flug is the grandfather of Boaz Levin, a writer and curator, Noa Levin, a philosopher and filmmaker, Michael Lach, a PhD student at the Weizmann institute, and Maya Lach, a psychologist.

Flug died in 2011 at Shaare Zedek Medical Center in Jerusalem, age 86.

== Published works ==
Collaborations

- The History of the Israelis and Palestinians with Martin Schäuble, 2007, ISBN 3-446-20907-7
