= Nadine Baudot-Trajtenberg =

Israeli economist

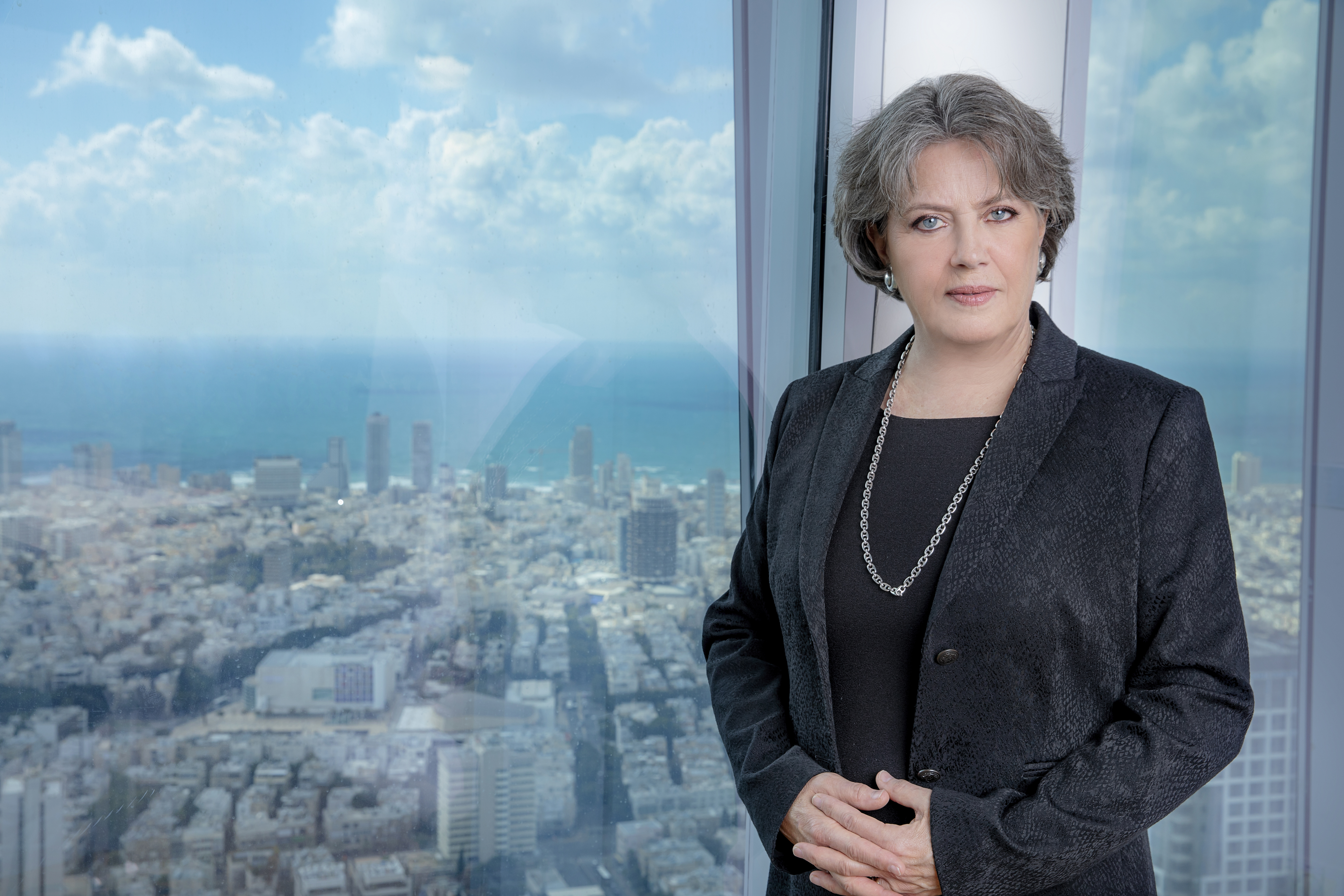
- Education: Université de Montréal; University of Oxford; Harvard University
- Occupation: Economist

Nadine Baudot-Trajtenberg (Hebrew: נדין בודו־טרכטנברג) is an Israeli economist, former deputy governor of the Bank of Israel.

== Early life amd education ==
She received her B.Sc. in economics from the University of Montreal; M.A. in philosophy, political science and economics from the University of Oxford, as one of the first women Rhodes Scholars; and Ph.D. in economics from Harvard University, under the supervision of Larry Summers.

She served as deputy governor of the Bank of Israel in 2014–2019, and acting governor in late 2018. She currently teaches at the Tiomkin School of Economics at Reichman University.

She is married to Manuel Trajtenberg. They have three children.
