= Martin Schäuble =

German writer

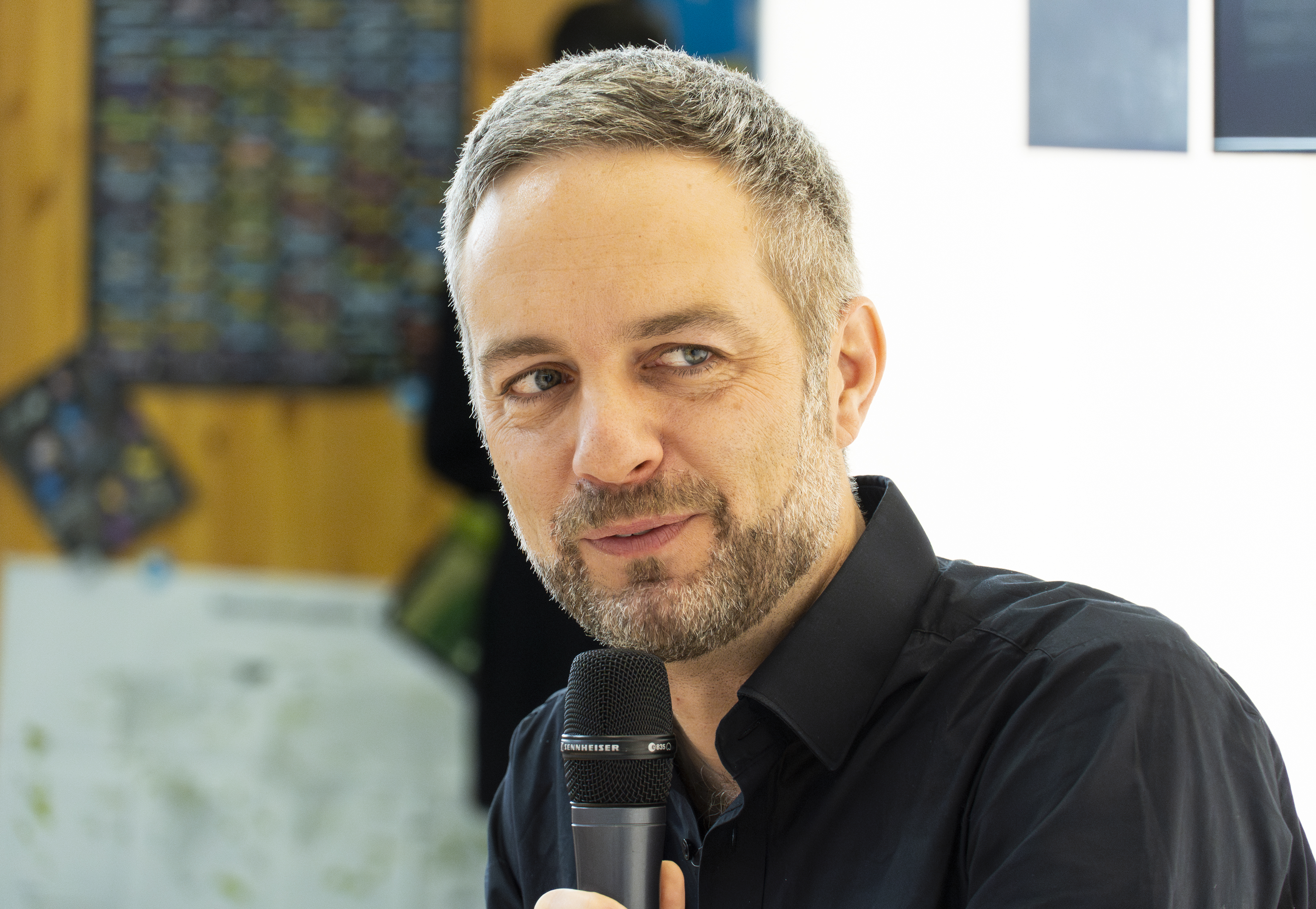
Martin Schäuble at the Frankfurt Book Fair 2025

Martin Schäuble (born December 1978) is a German novelist, journalist and writer of non-fiction books. His pen name is Robert M. Sonntag. His works have been translated into several languages.

== Early life ==
Schäuble grew up in the Southwest of Germany. He studied Political Science in Haifa in Israel, Birzeit in Palestine, as well as Berlin. He obtained his PhD in Political Science from the Freie Universität Berlin, exploring the life of two jihadists. Before his studies he worked for a German daily as a journalist.

== Work ==
=== Novels ===
Schäuble has visited numerous crisis regions, interviewing and researching the plight of many refugees. His novel Endland (Carl Hanser Publishers) asks what would it look like if a nationalistic right-wing party came to govern in a modern democratic country such as Germany. The Audiobook was released simultaneously.

The novel has been adapted into a play by the Schauspiel Hannover.

With his pen name Robert M. Sonntag, he wrote the novel Die Scanner (S. Fischer Publishers). It is a dystopia from the year 2035 as told by a 25-year-old Robert M. Sonntag. The book details the lives of its main characters as they negotiate modern life in a fully digitized environment. All literature has been scanned, digitized and censored while all humans are monitored by the same monolithic mega-corporation. The book is to be continued in 2019.

=== Non-fiction ===
Schäuble's non-fiction books focus on the intersection of politics, culture, and religion.

- User's Guide for Israel and Palestine (Piper Publishing house) is a manual for culturally sensitive travelers.
- Between Borders: Walking and hitchhiking through the Middle-East conflict (Carl Hanser publishers) is a travelogue.
- Black Box Jihad: Daniel and Sa‘ed on their way to Paradise (Carl Hanser Publishers) is the biography of two Jihadis – one Palestinian, one German.
- The History of the Israelis and Palestinians (Carl Hanser publishers) is based on eye-witness accounts reporting on the issue from both sides. The co-editor was Noah Flug.

== Bibliography ==
=== Non-fiction ===
- Gebrauchsanweisung für Israel und Palästina (2016)
- Zwischen den Grenzen. Zu Fuß durch Israel und Palästina (2013)
- Dschihadisten. Feldforschung in den Milieus (2011)
- Black Box Dschihad (2011)
- Die Geschichte der Israelis und Palästinenser (2007)

=== Novels ===
- Endland Carl Hanser Verlag (2017)
- Die Scanner (Robert M. Sonntag) S. Fischer Verlag (2013) Die Gescannten(Robert M. Sonntag) S. Fischer Verlag (2017)

=== Key awards ===
- 2018: Nomination for the Hansjörg Martin prize for Endland
- 2016: Author in residence at the Goethe Institute in Moscow ("literarische Leuchttürme" in Moskau (Goethe-Institut)
- 2013: Stuttgart Business Club Literature House prize (Preis des Wirtschaftsclubs im Literaturhaus Stuttgart) for Die Scanner
- 2012: Highly commended by „Evangelischer Buchpreis" for Black Box Dschihad
- 2008: Nominated for „The best Junior Scientific book of the year" in Austria (Nominierung für „Das beste Junior-Wissenschaftsbuch des Jahres" (Österreich)) for Die Geschichte der Israelis und Palästinenser
- 2007, 2011, 2013: The best 7 books for young readers (Deutschlandfunk, „Die besten 7 Bücher für junge Leser") for DGIUP, BLACK BOX, Scanner
- 2000: Catholic Prize for young journalists (Katholischer Nachwuchsjournalistenpreis)
