= Yehoshua Ben-Zion =

Israeli banker

Yehoshua Ben-Zion (Hebrew: יהושע בן ציון; 1924 – 2004) was an Israeli banker.

Ben-Zion was born in Mandate Palestine and spent his childhood in the United States. He was a member of the Irgun and later became a colonel in the Israel Defense Forces. In 1972 he was a jurist in the trial of the women involved in the Sabena Flight 571 hijacking. In 1973 he was the president of Lydda Military Court, with rank of major.

Ben-Zion served as the managing director of Israel-British Bank. Following the collapse of the bank in July 1974, owing British investors £46.6 million, Ben-Zion was convicted of embezzling £20 million ($39.4 million) from the bank. He was sentenced to 12 years in prison. After urging of the Israeli prime minister Menachem Begin in 1977, Ben-Zion was pardoned by the Israeli president Ephraim Katzir, on medical grounds. He was released after serving three years.
