= David Horowitz (economist) =

Israeli economist

- דוד הורוביץ
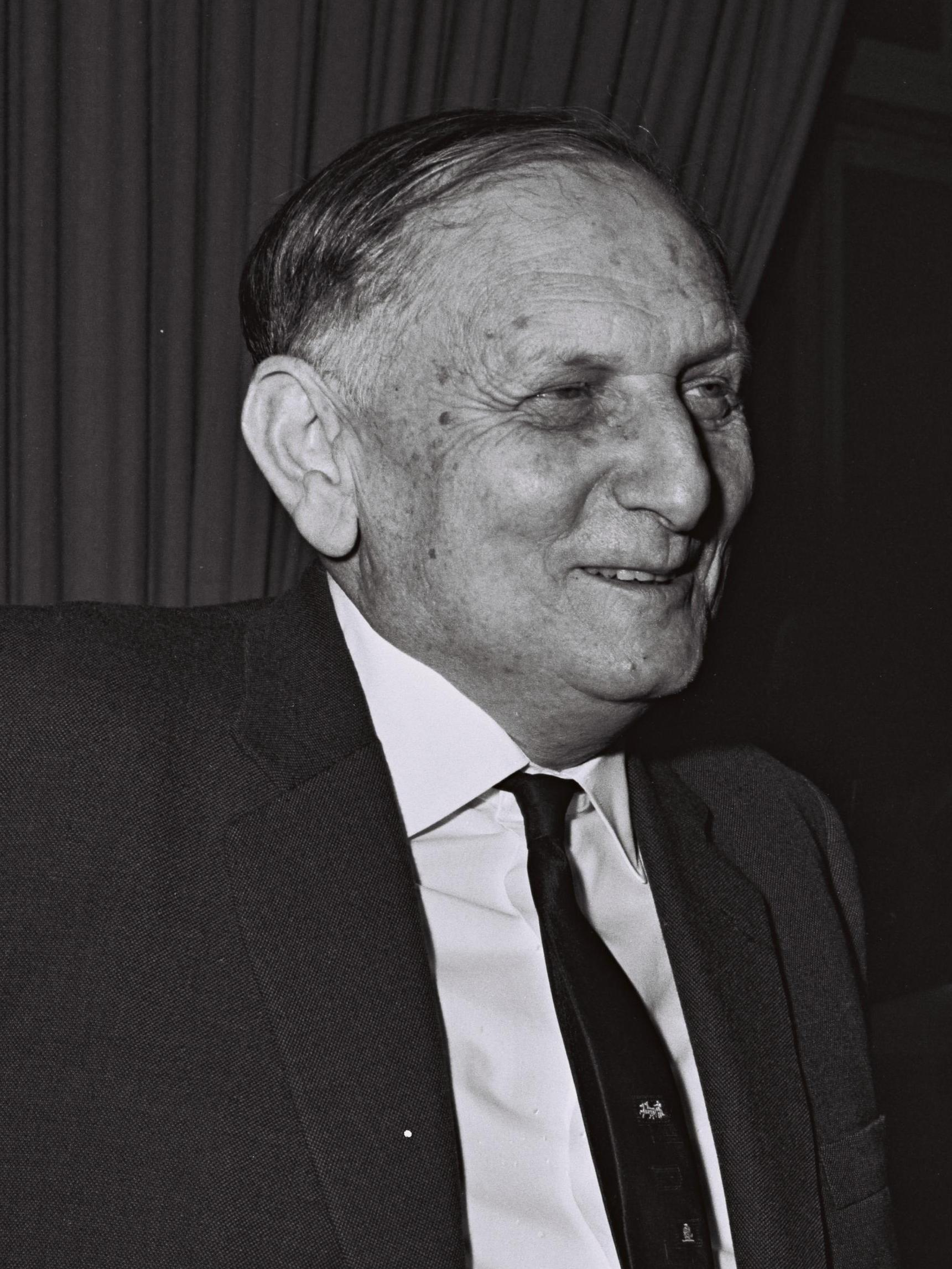
- Born: Drohobych, Austria-Hungary (now Ukraine)

David Horowitz (Hebrew: דוד הורוביץ; 1899 – 10 August 1979) was an Israeli economist and the first Governor of the Bank of Israel.

== Biography ==
David Horowitz was born in Drohobych, in Galicia, then part of the Austro-Hungarian Empire, now in Ukraine. He immigrated to Palestine in 1920 and was one of the first members of Hashomer Hatzair.

== Finance and political career ==
He served as the director of the Economic Department of the Jewish Agency for Israel and was a member of the Jewish Agency delegation to the United Nations in 1947. From May 1948 to June 1952, he was the first Director General of the Israeli Ministry of Finance.

In December 1954, he founded the Bank of Israel and served as its Governor until 31 October 1971. Following his retirement, he was appointed Chairman of the Advisory Council and the Advisory Committee of the Bank of Israel, serving as an honorary chairman until his death in 1979.

== Published works ==
- The Abolition of Poverty (1969)
- Economics of Israel (1967)
- Hemisphere, North and South: Economic Disparity Among Nations (1966)
- State in the Making (1953)
- Halakhah Kalkalit u-Mediniyyut Kalkalit be-Yisrael (1958)
- Mivneh u-Megammah be-Khalkalat Yisrael (1964)
- Ẓel ha-Etmol ve-Etgar ha-Maḥar (1962)
- Ha-Kimmum u-Va'ayotav ba-Olam u-ve-Ereẓ Yisrael (1945)
- Ha-Kalkalah ha-Ereẓ Yisre'elit be-Hitpattehutah (19482).

In his autobiography Ha-Etmol Shelli (1970), Horowitz describes the ideological struggle in the Palestine Labor and colonization movement in the late 1920s.

== Awards and recognition ==
In 1968 he was awarded the Israel Prize for Social Sciences.
