= Sandra Slaughter =

American software engineer and management scientist

Sandra Ann Slaughter (died November 3, 2014) was an American software engineer and management scientist known for her research on business analytics and the software development process. She was Alton M. Costley Chair and Professor of Information Technology Management at Georgia Tech. She and her husband also held a world record for the longest tandem bicycle tour.

== Education and career ==
Slaughter worked in the information technology industry for ten years, before returning to graduate study in management information systems, in which she earned a PhD through the University of Minnesota. Her 1995 doctoral dissertation, Software development practices and software maintenance performance: A field study, was co-advised by Rajiv Banker and Gordon B. Davis.

She became Xerox Research Chair in Carnegie Mellon University's Carnegie Mellon University, and then in 2007 moved to the Scheller College of Business at Georgia Tech.

== Personal life and cycling ==
Slaughter was married to Ronald Gray Slaughter. Between her industry work and her return to graduate study, the two of them took a 19-month hiatus, touring the world on a tandem bicycle. This tour earned them a Guinness World Record for the longest tandem bicycle tour, and was documented in a book, published in 1996.

== Recognition ==
Slaughter was named a distinguished fellow of the Institute for Operations Research and the Management Sciences (INFORMS) Information Systems Society in 2014. She was posthumously awarded the 2022 Information Systems Society President's Service Award.

== Selected works ==
Slaughter was the author or coauthor of two books:

- Tandem Times: A Bicycle Journey Around the World, Odyssey to the Limits (with R. Slaughter and K. Robinson, IME, 1996)
- A Profile of the Software Industry: Emergence, Ascendance, Risks, and Rewards (Business Expert Press, 2014)

She had over 100 publications, winning nine best paper awards. Among these, Paulo Goes singles out four as being especially innovative and influential:

- Ang, Soon; Slaughter, Sandra (2001), "Work outcomes and job design for contract versus permanent information systems professionals on software development teams", MIS Quarterly, 25 (3): 321–350, doi:10.2307/3250920, JSTOR 3250920
- Roberts, Jeffrey A.; Hann, Il-Horn; Slaughter, Sandra (2006), "Understanding the motivations, participation, and performance of open source software developers: a longitudinal study of the Apache projects", Management Science, 52 (7): 984–999, doi:10.1287/MNSC.1060.0554, S2CID 9916105
- Slaughter, Sandra; Levine, Linda; Ramesh, Balasubramaniam; Pries-Heje, Jan; Baskerville, Richard L. (2006), "Aligning software processes with strategy", MIS Quarterly, 30 (4): 891–918, doi:10.2307/25148758, JSTOR 25148758
- Joseph, Damien; Boh, Wai Fong; Ang, Soon; Slaughter, Sandra (2012), "The career paths less (or more) traveled: a sequence analysis of IT career histories, mobility patterns, and career success", MIS Quarterly, 36 (2): 427–452, doi:10.2307/41703462, hdl:10220/17815, JSTOR 41703462
