= Foundation for the Welfare of Holocaust Victims =

Israeli non-profit organization for Holocaust survivors

- Formation: 1991; 35 years ago
- Type: Non-profit
- Headquarters: Israel
- Services: Assisting Holocaust survivors with basic needs and support
- Funding: Claims Conference, Ministry of Finance
- Award: Medal of the Light (since 2011)

Foundation for the Welfare of Holocaust Victims is a registered Israeli association (non-profit organization) established by Holocaust survivors for Holocaust survivors living in Israel. The foundation was founded in 1991 and began operating in 1994 with the assistance of the Center organizations for Holocaust Survivors in Israel and in cooperation with the Claims Conference, with the aim of assisting Holocaust survivors who survived the Holocaust but were unable to recover, and today, in old age, they have a hard time leading a normal lifestyle on their own. Some of them do not have the necessary means to purchase basic products that are essential for their livelihood. The main funding for the fund comes from the Claims Conference and the Ministry of Finance. Holocaust survivors suffer from unique problems, which are a direct result of the Holocaust, problems that accompany them 24/7, disturb their peace, and intensify over the years. These are physical, health problems, mental distress or anxieties and worst of all loneliness and lack of family and social support networks, such as those that could have sweetened their difficult lives even slightly.

The Medal of the light is an award given on behalf of the Foundation since 2011 as an expression of appreciation to those who excel in working for the welfare of Holocaust survivors in Israel
