= Israel-British Bank =

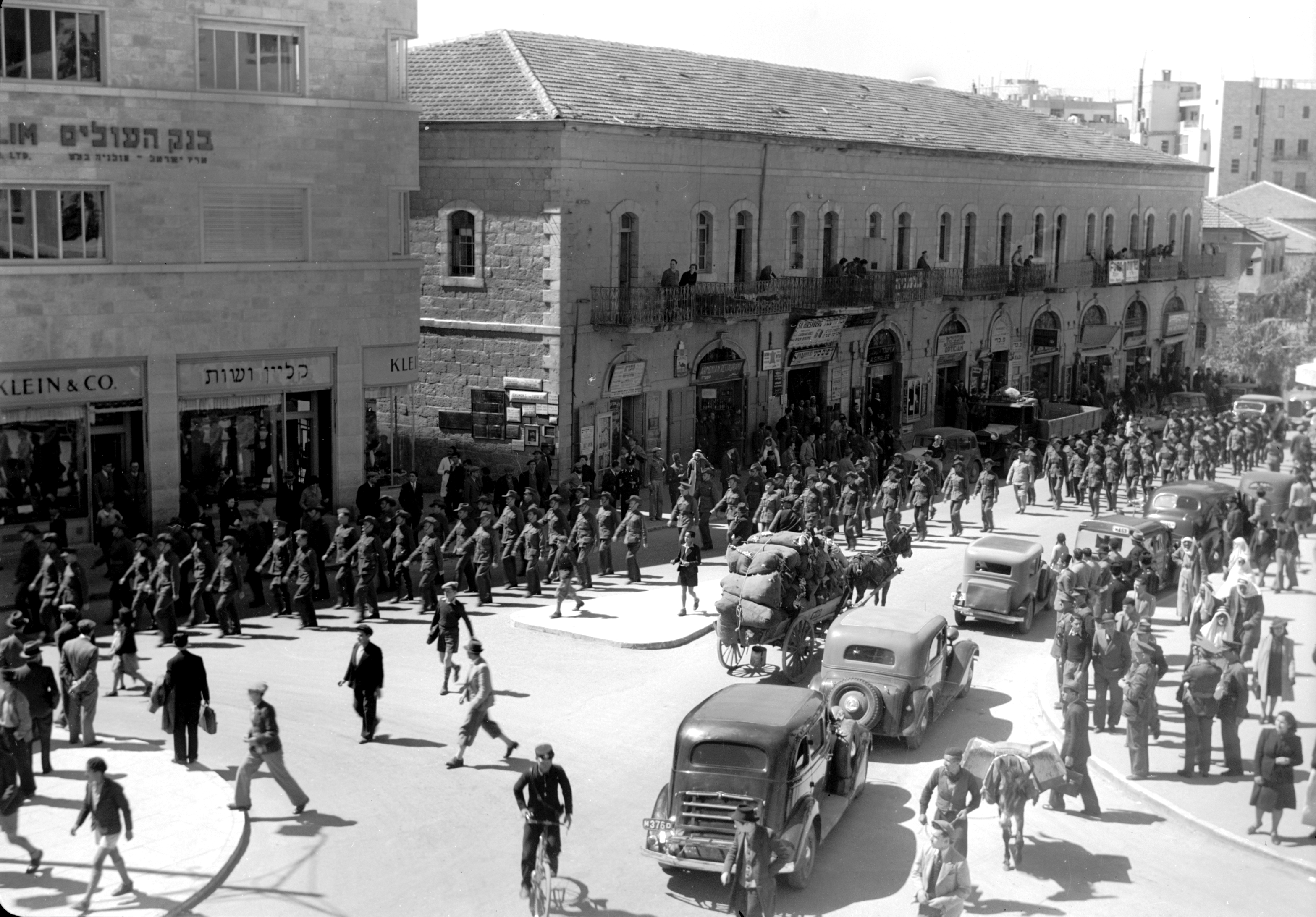
Australian soldiers marching down Jaffa Road in Jerusalem, the bank is to the left.

Israel-British Bank was a bank founded on 21 October 1929, by Polish Jewish immigrants to Mandate Palestine as Immigrants Bank Palestine-Poland. The bank changed its name to Bank Ha'olim Erez-Israel-Polania on 20 April 1937. The bank belonged to a British bank at whose head was Nahum Zeev Williams, a British Jewish philanthropist. The bank collapsed in July 1974.

== History ==
Nahum Zeev Williams purchased Bank Ha'olim in 1938 and on his death the bank passed into the hands of a group headed by his family, associated with the Mizrachi movement.

On 6 April 1945 the bank changed its name to Palestine-British Bank. By 1961 it had branches in Tel Aviv, Jerusalem, Haifa, Netanya, Jaffa, and London. On 1 August 1965, it became the Israeli-British Bank. On 1 October 1968, the London branch became a newly formed subsidiary under the title of Israel-British Bank (London).

=== Collapse ===
In July 1974 the bank collapsed, owing British investors £46.6 million. Yehoshua Ben-Zion, the managing director of Israel-British Bank was convicted of embezzling £20 million ($39.4 million) from the bank. He was sentenced to 12 years in prison. Ben-Zion was pardoned by the Israeli president Ephraim Katzir, on medical grounds at the urging of Israeli prime minister Menachem Begin in 1977. Ben Zion was released after serving three years.

Although the Israel-British Bank was headquartered in the United Kingdom, the majority of its stockholders were Israeli. The Bank of England took the view that the bank's nationality was determined not by its place of incorporation but by the nationality of its stockholders, and refused to accept responsibility. Initially Israel did not accept responsibility either. Still, in mid-1975 the Israeli government agreed to permit the pooling of the London subsidiary's remaining assets with those of the parent to satisfy creditors.

=== Chase Manhattan Bank NA v Israel-British Bank (London) Ltd ===
The case Chase Manhattan Bank NA v Israel-British Bank (London) Ltd resulted when Chase Manhattan Bank sued Israel-British Bank for US$2million that Chase had inadvertently paid twice shortly before Israel-British went into liquidation. Israel-British knew that there had been an error but failed to return the money. The court ruled in Chase's favor.
