= Karnit Flug =

Economist, Governor of the Bank of Israel

- קרנית פלוג
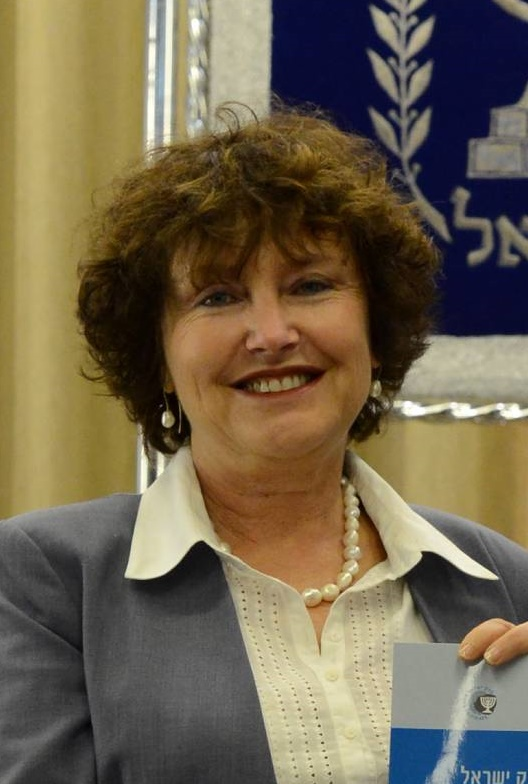

9th Governor of the Bank of Israel
- In office November 13, 2013 – November 12, 2018; Acting: July 1, 2013 – November 13, 2013
- Prime Minister: Benjamin Netanyahu
- Preceded by: Stanley Fischer
- Succeeded by: Amir Yaron

Personal details
- Born: Christina Flug; January 9, 1955 (age 71) Poland
- Education: Hebrew University Secondary School
- Alma mater: Hebrew University of Jerusalem; Columbia University
- Occupation: Economist
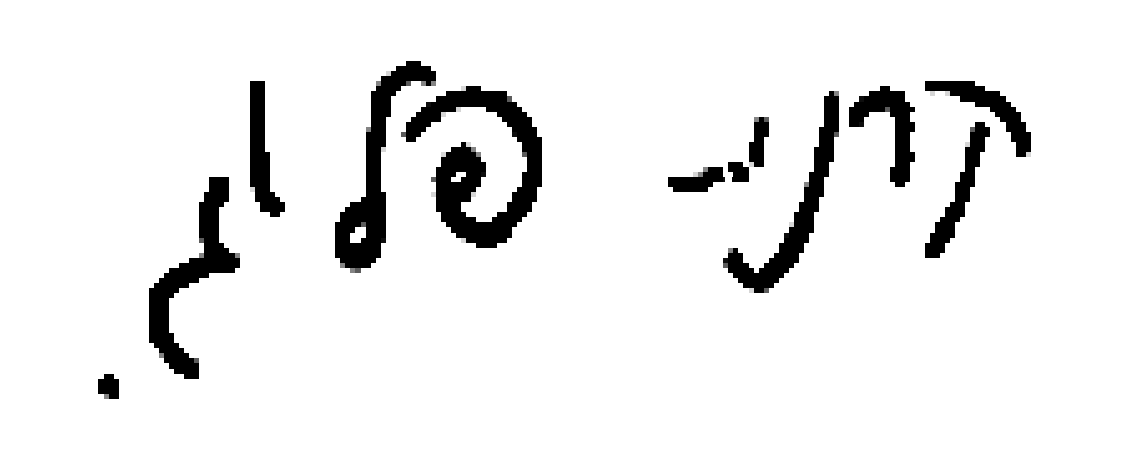
- Signature

Karnit Flug (Hebrew: קרנית פלוג; born January 9, 1955) is a Polish-born Israeli economist and government official who served as the 9th governor of the Bank of Israel from 2013 to 2018. She was the first, and to date the only, woman to hold that position.

== Biography ==
Karnit Flug graduated with a master's degree in economics from Hebrew University of Jerusalem in 1980, and a PhD in economics from Columbia University in 1985. In 1984 she joined the International Monetary Fund as an economist, then returned to Israel in 1988 and joined the Research Department of the Bank of Israel. In 1994 Dr. Flug was on leave from the central bank for two years, assigned to work at the Inter-American Development Bank in Washington D.C. as a Senior Research Economist. She returned to BoI in 1997 while appointed deputy director of the Research Department, then elevated to Department's Director and a member of the Bank's senior management in June 2001, a position she held for ten years.

In July 2011, Flug appointed by the Israeli Government as deputy governor of the Bank of Israel, on the recommendation of the BoI Governor Stanley Fischer. She served as Acting Governor from July 2013 until November, after Fisher's resignation. In October 2013, she was officially nominated to be the next Governor of the Bank of Israel by Prime Minister Benjamin Netanyahu, edging out initially chosen former BoI chief Jacob Frenkel, ending several months of uncertainty. On November 13, 2013, she was sworn in as governor, becoming the first woman to take the position.

== Awards and recognition ==
Flug won an "A" grade three times in Global Finance Magazine's annual Central Banker Report Cards, and was repeatedly considered one of the best bank governors in the world.

== Published works ==
- Karnit Flug, Nitsa (Kaliner) Kasir and Ofer Gur, "Absorption of Soviet Immigrants into the Israeli Labor Market: Occupational Substitution and Retention", in: "Immigrants: Liability or Asset?", Naomi Carmon (editor), p. 279-378, 1993.
- Karnit Flug and Nitsa (Kaliner) Kasir, "Labor Costs in Israeli Industry", Economic Review, Vol. 67, p. 21-44, 1993.
- Karnit Flug and Nitsa (Kaliner) Kasir, "The Absorption in the Labor Market of Immigrants from the CIS - the Short Run" The Economy Quarterly, 1995.
- Karnit Flug, Nitsa (Kaliner) Kasir and Ofer Gur, "The Absorption of Soviet Immigrants into the Labour Market: Aspects of Occupational Substitution and Retention", in: "Russian Jews on Three Continents – Migration and Resettlement", Lewin-Epstein, Ro'u and Ritterbans (editors), p. 433-470, 1997.
- Karnit Flug and Nitsa (Kaliner) Kasir,"Poverty and Employment and the Gulf between them", Israel Economic Review, Vol. 1, p. 55-80, 2003.
- Karnit Flug and Nitsa (Kaliner) Kasir, "The Single Parent Law, Labor Supply and Poverty", Israel Economic Review, Vol. 4, NO. 1, April, p. 59-110, 2006.

== See also ==
- Women in Israel
