= 10 agorot controversy =

Claim about an Israeli coin

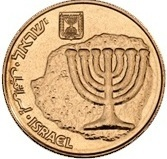
The Israeli 10 agorot coin

The 10 agorot controversy refers to a conspiracy theory made public by Palestine Liberation Organization chairman Yasser Arafat's appearance at a specially convened session of the UN Security Council in Geneva on 25 May 1990. At the session, Arafat claimed that the obverse design of an Israeli ten agorot coin showed a map of "Greater Israel" that represented Zionist expansionist goals.

== Arafat's claims ==
In support of his claim that the 10 agorot coins displayed a Greater Israel, Arafat also quoted a 1989 paper by Gwyn Rowley of the University of Sheffield published in GeoJournal. The paper titled "Developing Perspectives upon the Areal Extent of Israel: An Outline Evaluation" raised the question of what the maximum territorial extents of Eretz Yisrael were in the eyes of Israelis. As part of this inquiry, Rowley presented a map of the Middle East with a superimposed outline based on the embossed pattern of a contemporary 10 agorot coin. In the text Rowley surmised:

Whereas Israel has never formally defined its borders one possible indication of Israel's broader territorial ambitions might be seen in the Israeli ten agorot coin which carries a map, seemingly depicting an area that would extend over to encompass present-day Amman, Beirut, Baghdad, Damascus and the N parts of Saudi Arabia. This same territorial depiction was carried on the earlier one sheqal coin.

S. M. Berkowicz, of the Department of Physical Geography, at the Hebrew University of Jerusalem criticized Rowley's article in a subsequent paper also published by GeoJournal. Berkowicz concluded that the shape was based on an ancient coin and "There is of course no foundation to Rowley's undocumented claim." Rowley then responded that the coin might have been chosen because of its map-like shape.

Arafat's meeting in Geneva generated widespread global media coverage.

== Details of design ==
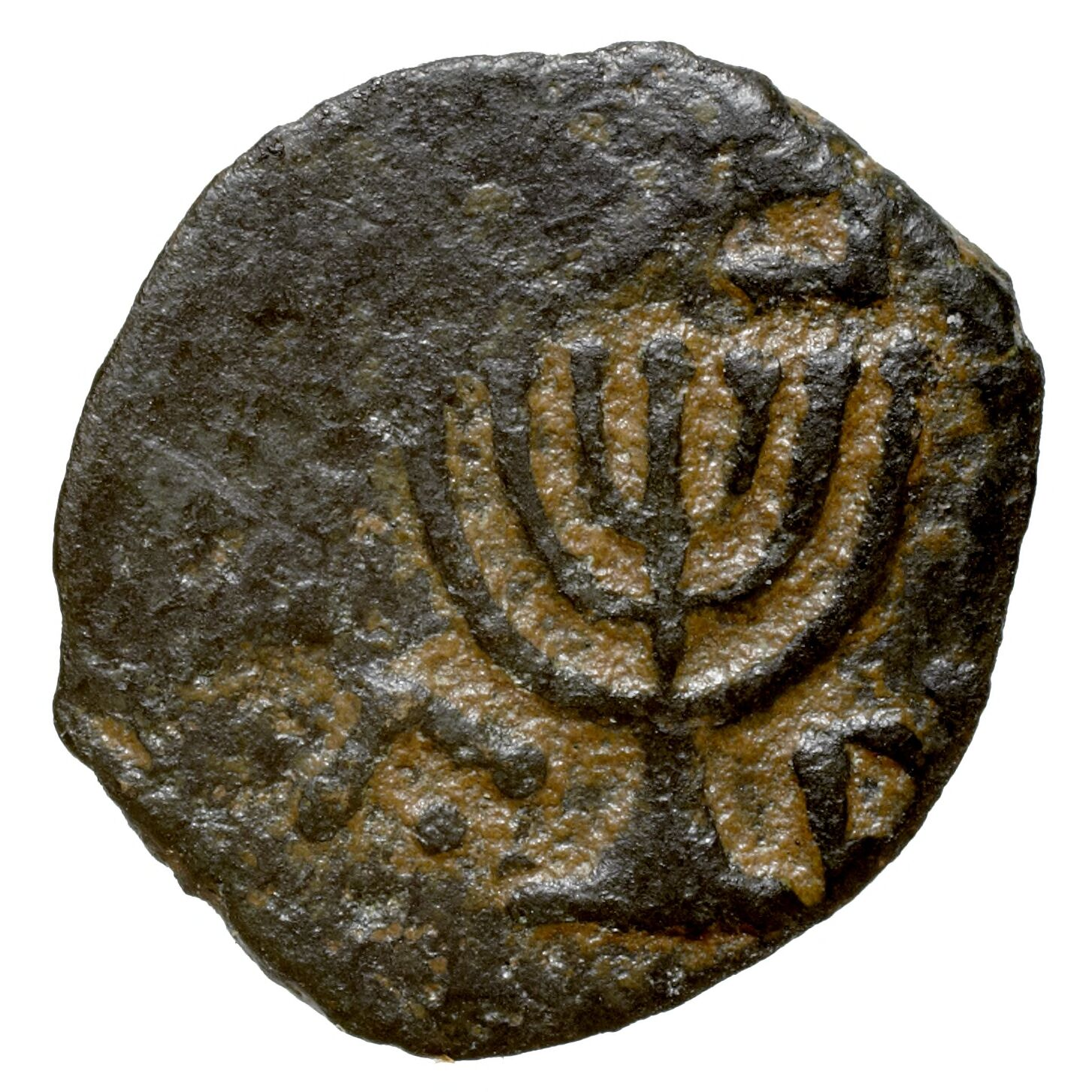
The design for the 10 agarot coin is based on a Hasmonean coin minted by Antigonus II Mattathias.

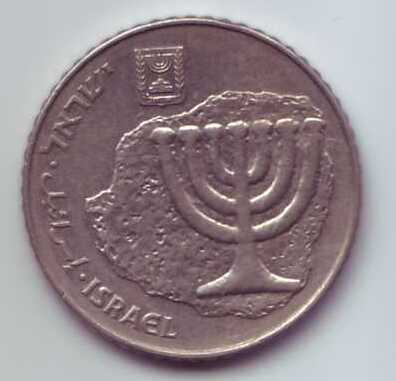
Old 100 Shekel coin, 1984

The Bank of Israel maintains that the 10 agorot design was selected for its historical value, and is a "replica of a coin issued by Mattathias Antigonus (40–37 B.C.E.) with the seven-branched candelabrum".

The design, by Nathan Karp, first appeared on the 100 shekel coin issued by the Bank of Israel on 2 May 1984. When the old shekel currency was replaced by the new shekel in September 1985, the design was copied to the new 10 agorot coin, which was equal in value to the old 100 shekel. This design was also adopted as the symbol of the Bank of Israel.
