= Israeli currency =

Israeli currency may refer to these items:

- Israeli new shekel, used from 1985 to the present
- Old Israeli shekel, used from 1980 to 1985
- Israeli pound, used from 1948 to 1980
- Shekel, used by the United Monarchy of Israel and the Kingdom of Israel, as well as during the Great Revolt
