= Israeli agora =

Denomination of currency

10 Agorot
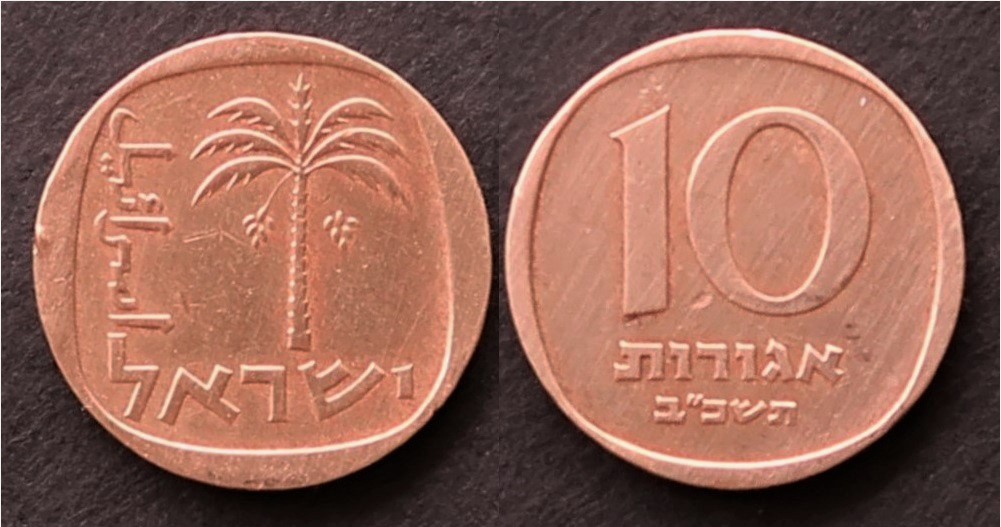
First side of the image: Obverse: Date palm tree. Lettering ישראל in Hebrew and اسرائيل in Arabic languages.
Second side of the image: Reverse: Denomination and lettering אגורות תשכ״ב in Hebrew.
Total 247,874,000 coins minted from 1960 to 1977.

The Agora (/æɡəˈrɑː/; plural Agorot /-ˈrɒt/; Hebrew: אגורה, pl. אגורות, agorot) is a denomination of the currency of Israel. The Israeli currency – the Israeli new shekel (ILS)– is divided into 100 agorot.

== History ==
The name agora refers to the subunits of three distinct Israeli currencies.

This name was used for the first time in 1960, when the Israeli government decided to change the subdivision of the Israeli pound (Hebrew: לירה, lira) from 1,000 prutah to 100 agorot due to the currency's depreciation. The name was suggested by the Academy of the Hebrew Language, and was borrowed from the Hebrew Bible:

וְהָיָה כָּל-הַנּוֹתָר בְּבֵיתְךָ יָבוֹא לְהִשְׁתַּחֲו‍ֹת לוֹ לַאֲגוֹרַת כֶּסֶף וְכִכַּר-לָחֶם
...every one that is left in thine house shall come and crouch to him for a piece of silver and a loaf of bread...

— I Samuel 2:36

The term "piece of silver" appears in Hebrew as "agorat kessef".

In 1980 the Israeli pound was replaced by the shekel at a rate of IL10 per IS 1. The new subdivision of the shekel was named agora ẖadaša ("new agora"). There were 100 new agorot in 1 shekel. The high rate of inflation in Israel in the early 1980s forced the Israeli government to change the Israeli currency once again in 1985. The new shekel was introduced at a rate of 1000 S per 1 NS. The name agora was used once again for its subdivision. This time the term "new" was avoided, in order to prevent confusion with the older subdivision (the pre-1980 agora was long since out of circulation). Currently, the term agora refers to the 100th part of the new shekel. There are coins of 10 and 50 agorot, though the 50 agorot coin bears the inscription: "1/2 New Shekel".

The 1 agora coin was withdrawn from circulation on April 1, 1991, by the Bank of Israel, as was the 5 agorot coin on January 1, 2008; in each case the value had shrunk to much less than the cost of production. Cash rounding has since been applied for purchases, such that the total price is now rounded to the nearest multiple of 10 agorot for payment in cash, but to 1 agora for payment by other means like payment cards or cheques.

== Issues ==
=== Israeli pound ===
Image	Value	Technical parameters			Description		Date of	
Image	Value	Diameter (mm)	Mass (g)	Composition	Obverse	Reverse	Issue	Withdrawal
	1 agora	20	1.03	aluminium 97%, magnesium 3%	Three ears of barley, "Israel" in Hebrew and Arabic	Value, date	01.01.1960	22.02.1980
	5 agorot	17.5	2.30 (copper) 0.8 (alum.)	1960—1975: copper 92%, aluminium 6%, nickel 2% 1976—1979: aluminium 97%, magnesium 3%	Three pomegranates, "Israel" in Hebrew and Arabic	Value, date	01.01.1960	22.02.1980
	10 agorot	21.5	4.15 (copper) 1.55 (alum.)	1960—1977: copper 92%, aluminium 6%, nickel 2% 1978—1979: aluminium 97%, magnesium 3%	Palm tree, "Israel" in Hebrew and Arabic	Value, date	01.01.1960	22.02.1980
	25 agorot	25.5	6.5	copper 92%, aluminium 6%, nickel 2%	Kinnor (lyre-like musical instrument), "Israel" in Hebrew and Arabic	Value, date	01.01.1960	22.02.1980
	IL1/2	24.5	6.8	copper 75%, nickel 25%	The state emblem, "Israel" in Hebrew, Arabic and English	Value, date	12.09.1963	31.03.1984

=== Old Israeli shekel ===
Old shekel coins
Image	Value	Technical parameters			Description		Date of	
Image	Value	Diameter (mm)	Mass (g)	Composition	Obverse	Reverse	Issue	Withdrawal
	1 new agora	15	0.6	aluminium 97%, magnesium 3%	Palm tree, "Israel" in Hebrew and Arabic	Value, date	24.02.1980	04.09.1986
	5 new agorot	18.5	0.9	aluminium 97%, magnesium 3%	The state emblem, "Israel" in Hebrew, Arabic and English	Value, date	24.02.1980	04.09.1986
	10 new agorot	16	2.1	copper 92%, nickel 8%	Three pomegranates, the state emblem, "Israel" in Hebrew, Arabic and English	Value, date	24.02.1980	04.09.1986
	IS1/2	20	3	copper 75%, nickel 25%	Lion, the state emblem, "Israel" in Hebrew, Arabic and English	Value, date, two stars	24.02.1980	04.09.1986

- Note that all dates on Israeli coins are given in the Hebrew calendar and are written in Hebrew numerals.

=== Israeli new shekel ===
New shekel coin series
Image	Value	Technical parameters				Description			Date of	
Image	Value	Diameter	Thickness	Mass	Composition	Edge	Obverse	Reverse	Issue	Withdrawal
	1 agora	17 mm	1.2 mm	2 g	Aluminium bronze 92% copper 6% aluminium 2% nickel	Plain	Ancient galley, the state emblem, "Israel" in Hebrew, Arabic and English	Value, date	4 September 1985	1 April 1991
	5 agorot	19.5 mm	1.3 mm	3 g	Aluminium bronze 92% copper 6% aluminium 2% nickel	Plain	Replica of a coin from the fourth year of the war of the Jews against Rome depicting a lulav between two etrogim, the state emblem, "Israel" in Hebrew, Arabic and English	Value, date	4 September 1985	1 January 2008
	10 agorot/ ₪1/10	22 mm	1.5 mm	4 g	Aluminium bronze 92% copper 6% aluminium 2% nickel	Plain	Replica of a coin issued by Antigonus II Mattathias with the seven-branched candelabrum, the state emblem, "Israel" in Hebrew, Arabic and English	Value, date	4 September 1985	Current
	50 agorot/ ₪1/2	26 mm	1.6 mm	6.5 g	Aluminium bronze 92% copper 6% aluminium 2% nickel	Plain	Lyre, the state emblem	Value, date, "Israel" in Hebrew, Arabic and English	4 September 1985	Current

- Note that all dates on Israeli coins are given in the Hebrew calendar and are written in Hebrew numerals.

== See also ==
- 10 agorot controversy
