= Palestine Foundries and Metal Works =

Palestinian ferrous metal works

The Palestine Foundries and Metal Works was a large ferrous metal works located near Haifa which was established in Palestine during the Mandate period.

== History ==
The foundry was founded by Alexander Kremener, who had previously been the Managing Director of Hartung A.G., Berlin, Germany. The company was incorporated in Palestine late in December 1933 and commenced activities the following month. The notice of incorporation gave the initial share capital as 30,000 Palestine pounds and the objects of the company as "To carry on the trade or business of iron masters, steel makers, manufacturers of and dealers in machinery, plant castings for machinery, copper and its various alloys and any other business in connection with the above." The erection of the iron and steel foundry and of enamelling works was started in June 1934.

The plant included an iron and steel foundry, the first of its kind in the Near East, an electric steel melting furnace and an enameling works. It produced enamelled bathtubs, sanitary appliances, cast iron pipes and connections, flushing cisterns and cast iron products.

In 1937, the Anglo-Palestine Bank petitioned the District Court of Haifa for the winding up of the company. The company went into voluntary liquidation in 1939.
