= Gabriel and Maxim Shamir =

Israeli graphic designers

Gabriel Shamir
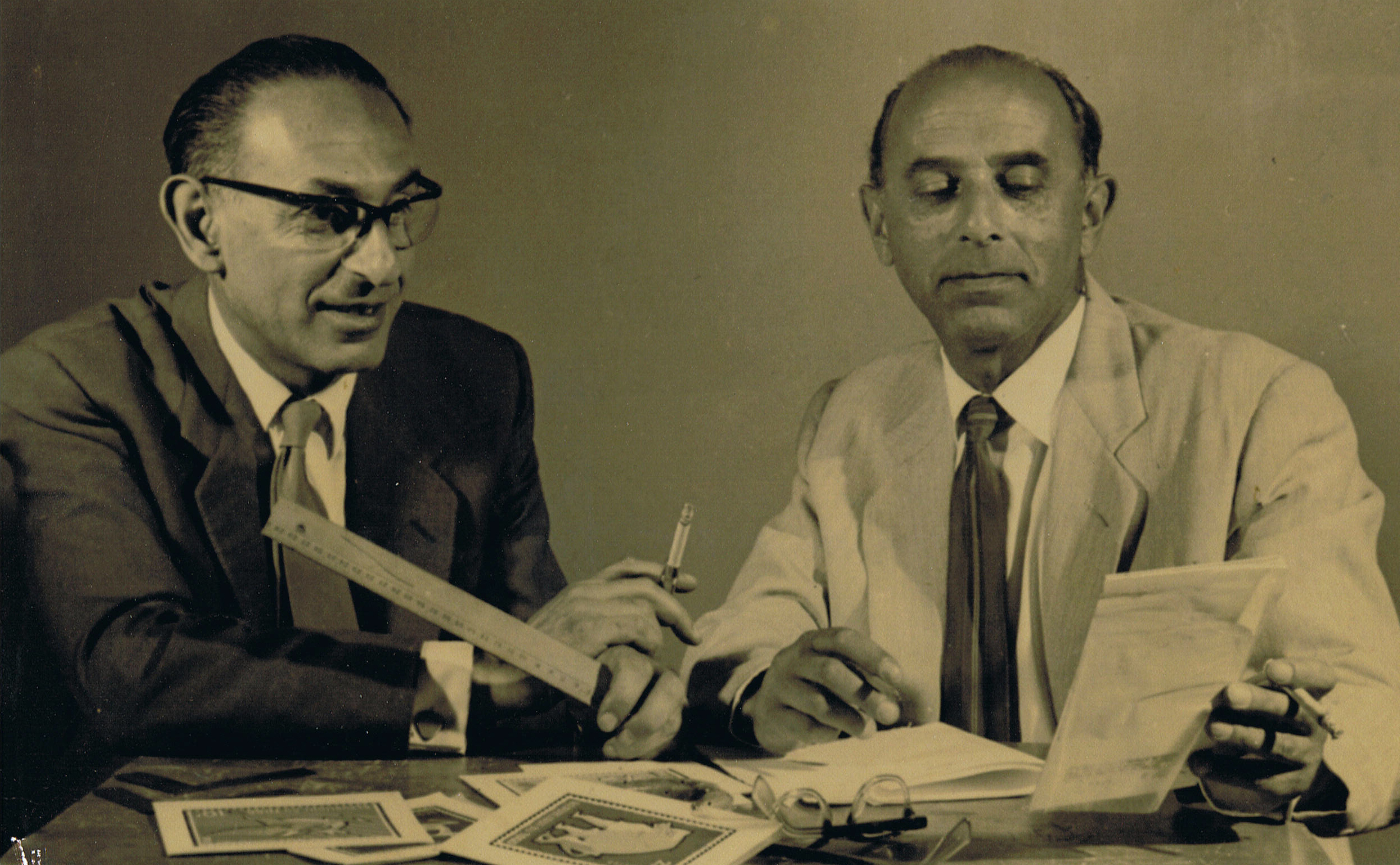
- Maxim (left) and Gabriel Shamir in their studio
- Born: Guttel Sheftelowitz; 1909; Liepāja (Libau), Latvia
- Died: 1992 (aged 82–83); Israel
- Occupation: Graphic designer
- Relatives: Maxim Shamir (brother)

Maxim Shamir
- Born: Maxim Sheftelowitz; 1910; Liepāja (Libau), Latvia
- Died: 1990 (aged 79–80); Israel
- Occupation: Graphic designer
- Relatives: Gabriel Shamir (brother)

Gabriel Shamir (Hebrew: גבריאל שמיר; 1909–1992) and Maxim Shamir (Hebrew: מקסים שמיר; 1910–1990) were Latvian-Israeli graphic designers. They designed Israel's official state emblems, medals, stamps and currency notes.

== Biography ==
Guttel (Gabriel) and Maxim Sheftelowitz (later Shamir) were born in Liepāja (Libau), Latvia. Both brothers studied graphics and design at the Kunstgewerbeschule in Berlin-Charlottenburg, Germany—Gabriel in 1926–30 and Maxim in 1928–33.

== Design career ==
Between 1930 and 1931 Gabriel worked for the Lintas advertising agency in Berlin and between 1931 and 1933 for Gumaelius in Stockholm. In 1934, they opened a graphic-design studio in Riga, Latvia, but the following year they immigrated to Palestine.

The brothers arrived during the Fifth Aliyah. They established the Shamir Brothers Studio on Rothschild Boulevard in Tel Aviv and began to design posters. In 1935, the Shamirs co-founded the Society of Hebrew Graphic Artists in Eretz Israel.

The Coat of arms of Israel designed by the Shamir Brothers

Because there were few Hebrew typefaces at the time, the Shamirs improvised hand-painted Hebrew letters, often into transliterated words from European languages and English.

Whereas Franz Kraus, the Austrian graphic designer who arrived in Eretz Israel a year before the Shamirs, adhered to a uniform type style, the brothers sought typography that they felt expressed the subject matter.

The Shamir brothers, enthusiastic about the establishment of the Jewish state, undertook to formalize and actualize the visual symbols of Israeli sovereignty and independence. They designed the state's emblems, medals, stamps, and currency notes, including the 1949 Israeli State Coat of Arms (an image of a menorah and olive branches).

In addition, they advertised cigarettes and other consumer goods, as well as designed stamps for countries in Africa, Asia, and South America. Their posters, other advertisements, and logos from 1935 to the close of their studio in 1974—rendered for the lottery, marketing fairs, land settlement, support of the army, food rationing, anti-black-market drives, and other nationalistic efforts—express a hyped Communist attitude, but not extreme or dour as in the propaganda of Bolshevik Russia.

== Exhibitions ==
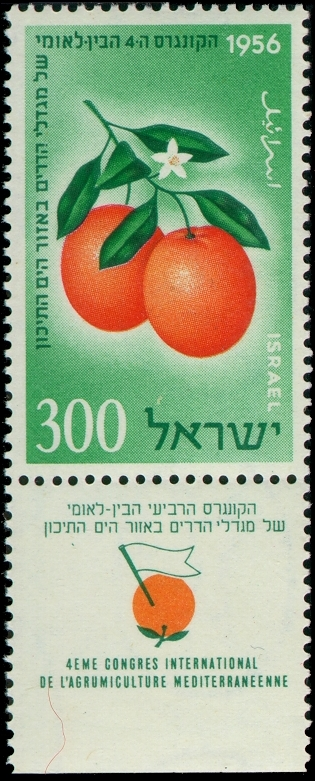
Israeli stamp designed by the Shamir brothers

- Commercial Art of Palestine 1936 – Levant Fair, Tel Aviv
- Shamir Brothers 1940 – Studio Shamir, Tel Aviv, Curators: Gabriel and Maxim Shamir
- To Live with the Dream 1989 – Museum Tel Aviv of Art, Curator: Batia Donner
- Product of Palestine (1923–1948) 1997 – Israel Museum, Jerusalem, Curator: Matti Meir
- Vision and Propaganda 1998 – Israel Museum, Jerusalem, Curator: Batia Donner
- Hebrew Graphics-Shamir Brothers Studio 1999 – Tel Aviv Museum of Art, Curator: Batia Donner
- Israeli Posters c.2000 – Zionist Central Archive, Jerusalem, Curator: Lifsha Ben-Shah
- Landmarks-Posters from Zionism 2000 Collection 2008 – Zionism 2000, Beit Yehoshua, Curator: Inbal Amit
- The Right to Scream – May 1 Posters 2003 – Farkash Gallery, Jaffa, Curator: Aharon Farkash
- A Dialogue between Shamir Brother and Contemporary Artists 2004 – WIZO Design College, Haifa, Curators: Anat Gateniu and students
- The New Hebrew −100 Years of Israeli Art, 2005 – Martin Gropius House, Berlin, Curators: Doreet LeVitte, Yigal Zalmona
- The Histadrut – All the Way with the State of Israel 2006 –amalnet.k12.il, Curators: Alexandra Tomarinson, Matti Kanterovich
- Bank Notes and Coins – permanent exhibit 2009 – Bank of Israel, Jerusalem, Curator: Dr. Rachel Barkai
- Israel Art – permanent exhibit 2010 – Israel Museum, Jerusalem, Curators: Amitai Mendelshon, Yigal Zalmona
- Hebrew Woman, Join the Army! 2010 – Eretz Israel Museum, Tel Aviv, Curator: Batia Donner
- 90 Years of Vision – Keren HaYesod Posters 2010 – Ben- Gurion Airport, Lod, Curator: David Tartakover
- The Emblem of the State in Caricature 2011 – Israel Museum of Cartoons and Comics, Holon, Curators: Daniella Gardosh Santo, Yoram E. Shamir
- 60 Anniversary of Binyanei HaUma 2011 – International Convention Center, Jerusalem, Curator: Monica Lavi
- JNF Posters – from the Beginning to the Present 2011 – eyarok.org.il, Curator: Meir Sadan
- Independence in the art of the Shamir Brothers. This 2018 exhibition held in the Latvian National Library, Riga; the Great Amber Hall, Liepaja; the Rothko Art Center, Daugavpils, Curator: Yoram E. Shamir
- Absorption in Israel – The story of the absorption of Iraqi Jews in Israel at the Babylonian Jewry Museum. The exhibition includes a number of packagings designed by Shamir Brothers. Curator: Orly Bahar Levy.

== See also ==
- Visual arts in Israel

== Published works ==
- Shamir, Maxim and Gabriel (1969). The Story of Israel in Stamps, New York: Sabra Books; Funk & Wagnalls.
- Shamir, Maxim and Gabriel (1969 and 1972). Die Geschichte Israels in Briefmarken, New York: Sabra Books; Tel Aviv: Hakesher.
- Exhibition catalog, Donner, Batia, et al. (1999). Shamir: Hebrew Graphics, Shamir Brothers Studio, Tel Aviv: Tel Aviv Museum of Art.
