= Israeli pound =

Currency of Israel between 1952 and 1980

לירה ישראלית (Hebrew); جنيه إسرائيلي (Arabic); Livre israélienne (French)
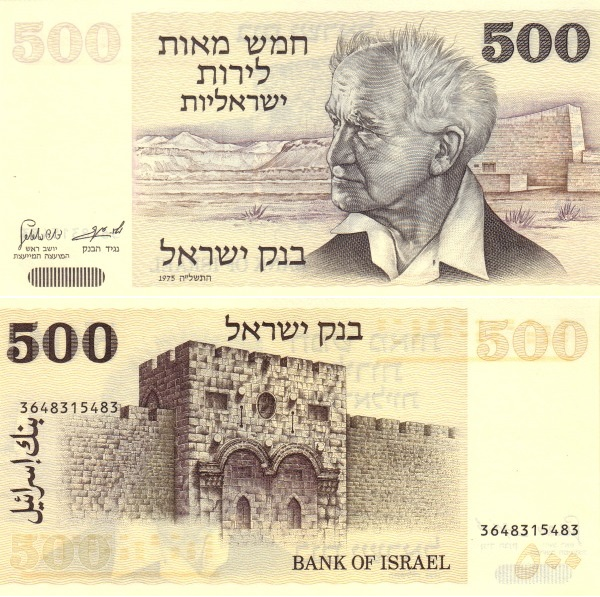
- IL 500 note (obverse and reverse) issued in 1975

ISO 4217
- Code: ILP

Unit
- Plural: pounds (לירות lirot)
- Symbol: ל"י (Hebrew), IL (Latin)

Denominations
- Subunit
- 1/1000: mil (1951–1952) pruta (1952–1960)
- 1/100: agora (1960–1980)
- Plural
- mil (1951–1952) pruta (1952–1960): prutot (פרוטות)
- agora (1960–1980): agorot (אגורות)
- Banknotes: IL 5, IL 10, IL 50, IL 100, IL 500
- Coins: 1, 5, 10, 25 agorot, IL 1/2, IL 1, IL 5

Demographics
- Date of introduction: 9 June 1952
- Date of withdrawal: 23 February 1980
- Replaced by: First shekel
- User(s): Israel (1952–1980)

Issuance
- Central bank: Bank Leumi (1952–1955); Bank of Israel (1955–1980)

Valuation
- Pegged with: £1 stg at par (1952–1954)
- This infobox shows the latest status before this currency was rendered obsolete.

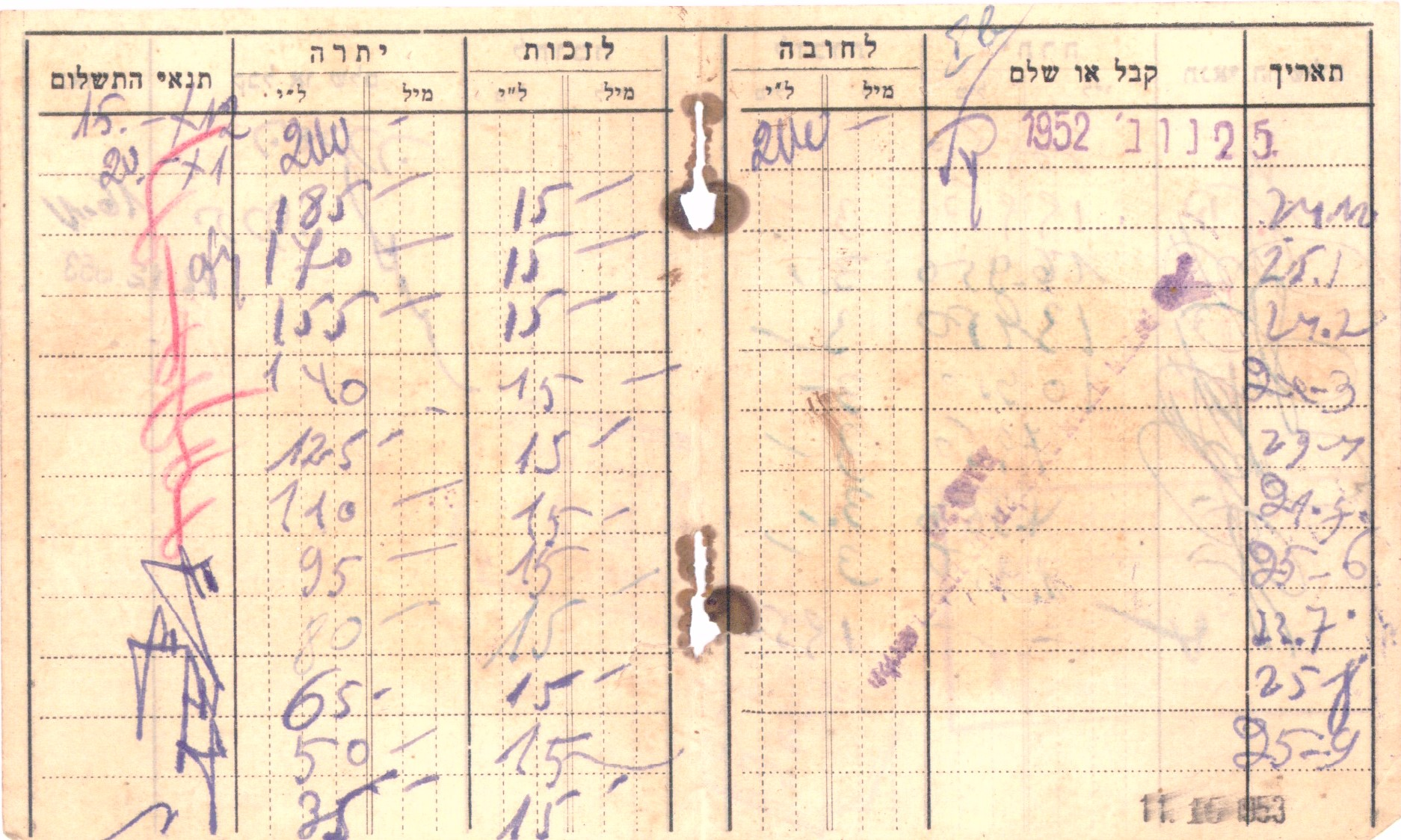
A passbook issued before the official adoption of prutot, and denominated in pounds and mils

The pound or lira (Hebrew: לירה ישראלית [Lira Yisra'elit]; Arabic: جنيه إسرائيلي [Junayh ʾIsrāʾīlī]; abbreviation: IL in Latin, ל״י in Hebrew; ISO code: ILP) was the currency of the State of Israel from 9 June 1952 until 23 February 1980. The Israeli pound replaced the Palestine pound and was initially pegged at par to £1 sterling. It was replaced by the shekel on 24 February 1980, at the rate of IS 1 = IL 10, which was in turn replaced by the new shekel in 1985.

Before the new currency was brought in, the Anglo-Palestine Bank issued banknotes denominated in Palestine pounds. They were in Hebrew לירה א״י (lira E.Y. i.e. lira Eretz-Yisraelit) and Arabic junayh filisṭīnī (جنيه فلسطيني).

On 1 May 1951, all the assets and liabilities of the Anglo Palestine Bank were transferred to a new company called Bank Leumi Le-Yisrael (Israel National Bank) and the currency name became: lira yisraelit (לירה ישראלית) in Hebrew, junayh ʾisrāʾīlī in Arabic, and Israeli pound in English. The new currency was issued in 1952, and entered circulation on June 9. From 1955, after the Bank of Israel was established and took over the duty of issuing banknotes, only the Hebrew name was used.

== History ==
The British Mandate of Palestine was created in 1918. In 1927 the Palestine Currency Board, established by the British authorities, and subject to the British Secretary of State for the Colonies, issued the Palestine pound (£P) which was legal tender in Mandate Palestine and Transjordan. £P1 was fixed at exactly £1 sterling. It was divided into 1,000 mils.

The Mandate came to an end on 14 May 1948, but the Palestine pound continued in circulation until new currencies replaced it. In Israel, the Palestine pound continued in circulation until the Israeli pound was adopted in 1952. The Israeli pound was subdivided into 1,000 prutot. The Israeli pound retained the Palestine pound's sterling peg. In August 1948, new banknotes were issued by the London-based Anglo-Palestine Bank, owned by the Jewish Agency.

The new coins were the first to bear the new state's name, and the banknotes had "The Anglo-Palestine Bank Limited" written on them. While the first coins minted by Israel were still denominated in "mils", the next ones bore the Hebrew name prutah (Hebrew: פרוטה). A second series of banknotes was issued after the Anglo-Palestine Bank moved its headquarters to Tel Aviv and became the Bank Leumi (Hebrew: בנק לאומי "National Bank"). The peg to sterling was abolished on 1 January 1954, and in 1960, the subdivision of the pound was changed from 1,000 prutot to 100 agorot (singular agora, Hebrew: אגורה ,אגורות).

Because lira (Hebrew: לִירָה) was a loanword from Latin, a debate emerged in the 1960s over the name of the Israeli currency due to its non-Hebrew origins. This resulted in a law ordering the Minister of Finance to change the name from lira to the Hebrew name shekel (Hebrew: שקל). The law allowed the minister to decide on the date for the change. The law came into effect in February 1980, when the Israeli government introduced the 'Israeli shekel' (now called old Israeli shekel), at a rate of IL 10 = IS 1. On 1 January 1986, the old shekel was replaced by the Israeli new shekel at a ratio of IS 1,000 : ₪1.

== Coins ==
Israel's first coins were aluminium 25 mil pieces, dated 1948 and 1949, which were issued in 1949 before the adoption of the pruta. Later in 1949, coins were issued in denominations of 1, 5, 10, 25, 50, 100 and 250 prutah. The coins were conceived, in part, by Israeli graphic designer Otte Wallish.

All coins and banknotes issued in Israel before June 1952 were part of the Palestine pound.

In 1960, coins were issued denominated in agora. There were 1, 5, 10 and 25 agorot pieces. In 1963, IL 1/2 and IL 1 coins were introduced, followed by IL 5 coins in 1978.

The IL 5 denomination had previously been used for non-circulating commemorative coins, including silver coins with a Hanukkah theme.

=== Mil (1949) ===
Image	Value	Diameter (mm)	Mass (g)	Composition	Obverse	Reverse	Date of issue	Date of withdrawal
	25 mils	30	3.1—3.8	aluminium 97%, magnesium 3%	Grape, "Israel" in Hebrew and Arabic	Value, olive ornament	06.04.1949	06.09.1950

=== Pruta (1949–1960) ===
Image	Value	Diameter (mm)	Mass (g)	Composition	Obverse	Reverse	Date of issue	Date of withdrawal
	1 pruta	21	1.3	aluminium 97%, magnesium 3%	Anchor, "Israel" in Hebrew and Arabic	Value, olive ornament	25.10.1950	22.02.1960
	5 prutot	20	3.2	copper 95%, tin 3%, zinc 2%	Lyre, "Israel" in Hebrew and Arabic	Value, olive ornament	28.12.1950	22.02.1960
	10 prutot	27	6.1	copper 95%, tin 3%, zinc 2%	Amphora, "Israel" in Hebrew and Arabic	Value, olive ornament	04.01.1950	22.02.1960
	10 prutot	24.5	1.6	aluminium 97%, magnesium 3%	Amphora, palms, "Israel" in Hebrew and Arabic	Value, olive ornament	18.09.1952	22.02.1960
	10 prutot	24.5	1.6	aluminium 97%, magnesium 3%	Amphora, palms, "Israel" in Hebrew and Arabic	Value, olive ornament	27.12.1956	22.02.1960
	25 prutot	19.5	2.8	copper 75%, nickel 25%	Grape, "Israel" in Hebrew and Arabic	Value, olive ornament	04.01.1950	22.02.1960
	50 prutot	23.5	5.6	copper 75%, nickel 25%	Grape, "Israel" in Hebrew and Arabic	Value, olive ornament	11.05.1949	22.02.1960
	100 prutot	28.5	11.3	copper 75%, nickel 25%	Palm, "Israel" in Hebrew and Arabic	Value, olive ornament	25.05.1949	22.02.1960
	100 prutot	25.6	7.3	steel 90%, nickel 10%	Palm, "Israel" in Hebrew and Arabic	Value, olive ornament	21.04.1955	22.02.1960
	250 prutot	32.2	14.1	copper 75%, nickel 25%	Hordeum, "Israel" in Hebrew and Arabic	Value, olive ornament	11.10.1950	22.02.1960
	500 prutot	37.1	25	silver 50%, copper 37,5%, nickel 12,5%	Three pomegranates, "Israel" in Hebrew and Arabic	Value, olive ornament	22.05.1952	22.02.1960

=== Agora (1960–1978) ===
Image	Value	Diameter (mm)	Mass (g)	Composition	Obverse	Reverse	Date of issue	Date of withdrawal
	1 agora	21	1.3	aluminium 97%, magnesium 3%	Barley, "Israel" in Hebrew and Arabic	Value, date	12.05.1960	22.02.1980
	5 agorot	17,5	2.3	1960—1975: copper 92%, aluminium 6%, nickel 2% 1976—1979: aluminium 97%, magnesium 3%	Three pomegranates, "Israel" in Hebrew and Arabic	Value, date	20.10.1960	22.02.1980
	10 agorot	21,5	5	1960—1977: copper 92%, aluminium 6%, nickel 2% 1978—1979: aluminium 97%, magnesium 3%	Date palm, "Israel" in Hebrew and Arabic	Value, date	06.05.1960	31.03.1984
	25 agorot	25,5	6.5	copper 92%, aluminium 6%, nickel 2%	Lyre, "Israel" in Hebrew and Arabic	Value, date	17.03.1960	22.02.1980
	IL 1/2	24,5	6.8	copper 75%, nickel 25%	The state emblem, "Israel" in Hebrew, Arabic and English	Value, date	12.09.1963	31.03.1984
	IL 1	27,5	9	copper 75%, nickel 25%	The state emblem, "Israel" in Hebrew, Arabic and English	Value, date	12.09.1963	31.03.1984
	IL 1	27,5	9	copper 75%, nickel 25%	Three pomegranates, the state emblem, "Israel" in Hebrew, Arabic and English	Value, date, two stars	1967	31.03.1984
	IL 5	30	11,2	copper 75%, nickel 25%	Lion, the state emblem, "Israel" in Hebrew, Arabic and English	Value, date, two stars	21.09.1978	31.03.1984

== Banknotes ==
In 1948, the government issued fractional notes for 50 and 100 mils. The Anglo-Palestine Bank issued banknotes for 500 mils, 1, 5, 10 and 50 pounds between 1948 and 1951. In 1952, the government issued a second series of fractional notes for 50 and 100 prutah with 250 prutah notes added in 1953. Also in 1952, the "Bank Leumi Le-Israel" took over paper money production and issued the same denominations as the Anglo-Palestine Bank except that the 500 mils was replaced by a 500 prutah note.

The Bank of Israel began note production in 1955, also issuing notes for 500 prutah, IL 1, IL 5, IL 10 and IL 50. In 1968, IL 100 notes were introduced, followed by IL 500 notes in 1975.

=== Bank Leumi series (1952) ===
Image	Value	Dimensions	Main Colour	Description		Date of	
Image	Value	Dimensions	Main Colour	Obverse	Reverse	issue	ceased to be legal tender
	500 prutah (IL1/2)	148 × 72 mm	Olive-green on light-blue	The denomination in centre and above "Bank Leumi le-Israel B.M." all in Hebrew; all surrounded by guilloches.	The denomination and "Bank Leumi le-Israel B.M." all in Arabic and English; all surrounded by guilloches.	9 June 1952	7 February 1961
	IL 1	150 × 75 mm	Green-pink	The denomination in centre and above "Bank Leumi le-Israel B.M." all in Hebrew; all surrounded by guilloches.	The denomination and "Bank Leumi le-Israel B.M." all in Arabic and English; all surrounded by guilloches.	9 June 1952	7 February 1961
	IL 5	155 × 80 mm	Red-brown	The denomination in centre and above "Bank Leumi le-Israel B.M." all in Hebrew; all surrounded by guilloches.	The denomination and "Bank Leumi le-Israel B.M." all in Arabic and English; all surrounded by guilloches.	9 June 1952	7 February 1961
	IL 10	155 × 80 mm	Gray-pink	The denomination in centre and above "Bank Leumi le-Israel B.M." all in Hebrew; all surrounded by guilloches.	The denomination and "Bank Leumi le-Israel B.M." all in Arabic and English; all surrounded by guilloches.	9 June 1952	7 February 1961
	IL 50	160 × 85 mm	Brown-green	The denomination in centre and above "Bank Leumi le-Israel B.M." all in Hebrew; all surrounded by guilloches.	The denomination and "Bank Leumi le-Israel B.M." all in Arabic and English; all surrounded by guilloches.	9 June 1952	7 February 1961

=== First series (1955) ===
Image	Value	Dimensions	Main Colour	Description			Date of	
Image	Value	Dimensions	Main Colour	Obverse	Reverse	Watermark	issue	ceased to be legal tender
	500 pruta (IL 1/2)	130 × 72 mm	Red	Ruins of an ancient synagogue at Bir'am in the Upper Galilee.	An abstract design.	Menorah with an imprint of cyclamen.	4 August 1955	31 March 1984
	IL 1	135 × 72 mm	Blue	View of the Upper Galilee.	An abstract design.	Menorah with an imprint of anemones.	27 October 1955	31 March 1984
	IL 5	140 × 78 mm	Brown	Negev landscape with a settlement and farm equipment.	An abstract design.	Menorah with an imprint of irises.	27 October 1955	31 March 1984
	IL 10	150 × 82 mm	Green	View of the Jezreel Valley depicting settlements and cultivated fields.	An abstract design.	Menorah with an imprint of tulips.	4 August 1955	31 March 1984
	IL 50	160 × 87 mm	Blue	The road to Jerusalem.	An abstract design.	Menorah with an imprint of oleander.	19 September 1957	31 March 1984

=== Second series (1959) ===
Image	Value	Dimensions	Main Colour	Description			Date of	
Image	Value	Dimensions	Main Colour	Obverse	Reverse	Watermark	issue	ceased to be legal tender
	IL 1/2	130 × 70 mm	Green	Pioneer-woman soldier holding a basket of oranges against a background of fields.	Tomb of the Sanhedrin in Jerusalem.	The profile of the woman.	15 October 1959	31 March 1984
	IL 1	135 × 75 mm	Blue	Fisherman carrying fishing gear against a background of a bay.	Mosaic from the floor of an ancient synagogue at lssafiya on Mt. Carmel.	The profile of the fisherman.	15 October 1959	31 March 1984
	IL 5	140 × 78 mm	Brown	Labourer holding a sledge-hammer against a background of an industrial plant.	Roaring lion depicted on an ancient Hebrew seal found at Megiddo.	The profile of the labourer.	15 October 1959	31 March 1984
	IL 10	150 × 82 mm	Purple	Scientist in a laboratory.	Passage from the Book of Isaiah and the Dead Sea Scrolls.	The profile of the scientist.	15 October 1959	31 March 1984
	IL 50	178 × 93 mm	Brown	Two young pioneers against a background of an agricultural settlement in the Negev.	Menorah from the ancient synagogue of Nirim in the Negev.	The profile of the pioneers.	9 December 1960	31 March 1984

=== Third series (1970) ===
Image	Value	Dimensions	Main Colour	Description			Date of	
Image	Value	Dimensions	Main Colour	Obverse	Reverse	Watermark	issue	ceased to be legal tender
	IL 5	150 × 75 mm	Light blue	Portrait of Albert Einstein.	The Atomic reactor at Nahal Sorek.	Profile of Albert Einstein.	13 January 1972	31 March 1984
	IL 10	160 × 82 mm	Yellow-ivory	Portrait of Chaim Nachman Bialik.	Bialik's home in Tel-Aviv.	Profile of Chaim Nachman Bialik.	6 August 1970	31 March 1984
	IL 50	170 × 84 mm	Brown-red	Portrait of Chaim Weizmann.	The Knesset Building in Jerusalem.	Profile of Chaim Weizmann.	13 January 1972	31 March 1984
	IL 100	180 × 90 mm	Blue	Portrait of Theodor Herzl.	The Emblem of the State of Israel surrounded by the emblems of the twelve tribes.	Profile of Theodor Herzl.	27 February 1969	31 March 1984

=== Fourth series (1975) ===
Image	Value	Dimensions	Main Colour	Description			Date of	
Image	Value	Dimensions	Main Colour	Obverse	Reverse	Watermark	issue	ceased to be legal tender
	IL 5	128 × 76 mm	Brown	Portrait of Henrietta Szold; Hadassah Hospital on Mt. Scopus in Jerusalem.	Lion's Gate in the Old City of Jerusalem.	Profile of Henrietta Szold.	11 March 1976	31 March 1984
	IL 10	135 × 76 mm	Pink-purple	Portrait of Moshe Montefiori; the Mishkanot Shaananim quarter in Jerusalem with the windmill.	Jaffa Gate in the Old City of Jerusalem.	Profile of Moshe Montefiori.	30 January 1975	31 March 1984
	IL 50	141 × 76 mm	Green	Portrait of Chaim Weizmann; the Wix Library at the Weizmann Institute of Science.	Damascus gate in the Old City of Jerusalem.	Profile of Chaim Weizmann.	26 January 1978	31 March 1984
	IL 100	147 × 76 mm	Blue	Portrait of Theodor Herzl; the entrance gate to Mt. Herzl in Jerusalem.	Zion Gate in the Old City of Jerusalem.	Profile of Theodor Herzl.	14 March 1975	31 March 1984
	IL 500	153 × 76 mm	Ivory-brown	Portrait of David Ben-Gurion; the library at kibbutz Sde Boker.	Golden Gate in the Old City of Jerusalem.	Profile of David Ben-Gurion.	26 May 1977	31 March 1984

== See also ==
- British currency in the Middle East
- Bank of Israel
- Economy of Israel
- Paul Kor

== General and cited references ==
- Krause, Chester L.; Clifford Mishler (1991). Standard Catalog of World Coins: 1801–1991 (18th ed.). Krause Publications. ISBN 0873411501.
- Pick, Albert (1994). Bruce, Colin R. II; Shafer, Neil (eds.). Standard Catalog of World Paper Money: General Issues (7th ed.). Krause Publications. ISBN 0-87341-207-9.
