= Willie Wind =

Willie Wolf Wind (January 24, 1913 – October 11, 1995) was an American graphic artist and graphic designer whose work is on display in Israel, and the United States (Illinois, and Florida).

== Life ==
Born in Berlin, Germany, he showed a talent for art as a child and studied art in school. After Kristallnacht (November 9–10, 1938), Willie fled from Nazi Germany to the British Mandate of Palestine, while his brothers Edward and Julius fled to the United States, his brother Hy to Shanghai, China. All later moved to the US. Another sister, Shoshana, also fled to Palestine.

Willie's younger sister, Margot Wind, stayed in Germany with her parents Jacob and Sima Wind. All three were forcibly deported to Tarnów, Poland in 1939. On June 10, 1942, Margot came home to an empty apartment, her parents apparently taken by the Nazis. Soon thereafter, she married Charles "Chaskel" Schlesinger, 10 years her senior. Through a series of what she called "miracles," she and her husband were rescued by Oskar Schindler

Margot is incorrectly listed as "Maria Weiner" on Page 1, Line 280, and Chaskel is listed by his Hebrew name, "Abraham Schlesinger" on List 1, Line 37 on Schindler's List.

After traveling safely to France after World War II, they emigrated to the United States.

In Palestine, he joined the Palmach and pursued his art career.

In 1948, he won a design competition for the new State of Israel's coat of arms, the Emblem of Israel. Israel's Knesset eventually adopted a modified version of Wind's design.

He also designed among the first postage stamps for United Nations and many stamps for Israel, including a 1951 Jewish National Fund 80Pr Tab Strip .

After migrating to Chicago, Illinois, USA, in 1954 to join his three brothers Edward, Hy (Chaim), and Julius, and his sister Margot, he designed commemorative stamps for newly independent Ghana and Togo and stained-glass windows for synagogues in Chicago and Coconut Creek, Florida. The Chicago stained-glass windows (nickname "Wind-ows") were moved to Ezra-Habonim, The Niles Township Jewish Congregation in Skokie, Illinois.

Over the next 40 years, he worked on a variety of artistic and creative projects, both commercial and religious, in Israel and the United States. He co-founded Creative Design Board, which he eventually sold to Foster & Kleiser, a major designer of corporate artwork and billboards, now owned by Clear Channel Outdoors.

He was married to Paula Pnina (Schwartzbard) Wind (May 22, 1920 – October 15, 2017) whose parents and five sisters were murdered in the Holocaust. They had one daughter, Gail (Yael) Wind Schneiderman, who lives in Wilmette, a suburb north of Chicago.
