= GeoJournal =

- Discipline: Geography
- Language: English

Publication details
- History: 1977-present
- Publisher: Springer Science+Business Media (Netherlands)
- Frequency: Monthly

Standard abbreviations
- ISO 4: GeoJournal

Indexing
- CODEN: GEOJDQ
- ISSN: 0343-2521 (print); 1572-9893 (web)
- LCCN: 78642013
- JSTOR: 03432521
- OCLC no.: 643612472

Links
- Journal homepage; Online archive

GeoJournal is a peer-reviewed international academic journal on all aspects of geography founded in 1977. Twelve issues (three volumes) a year were published by Springer Netherlands (formerly Kluwer) until December 2009 and can be accessed via SpringerLink. Starting February 2010, GeoJournal was relaunched as an international journal for spatially integrated social sciences and humanities with six issues a year. The journal's editor-in-chief is currently Barney Warf (Department of Geography, University of Kansas).
