= Palestine pound =

Currency of the British Mandate of Palestine and later Israel from 1927 to 1952

جنيه فلسطيني (Arabic); לירה פלשתינאית (א״י) (Hebrew)
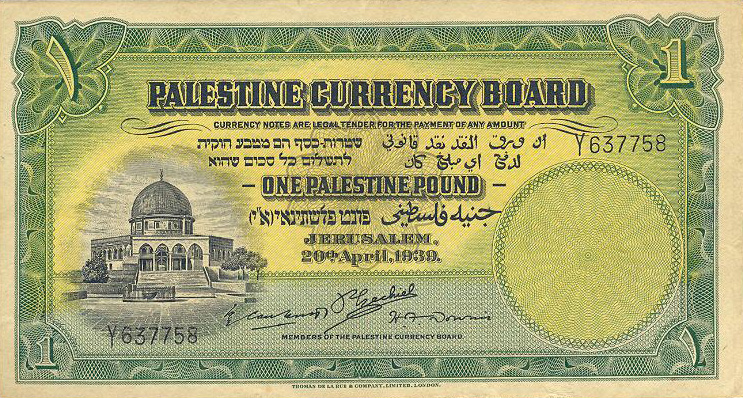
- A 1939 one Palestine pound note

Units of account
- Symbol: £P or LP
- Subunit
- ^{1}/_{1000}: Mil
- ^{1}/_{1000}: Prutah (from 1950 in Israel)

Denominations
- Banknotes: 500 mils, £P1, £P5, £P10, £P50, £P100
- Coins: 1, 2, 5, 10, 20, 25, 50, 100 mils, 1, 5, 10, 25, 50, 100, 250, 500 prutot

Demographics
- Replaced: Egyptian pound (Mandatory Palestine)
- Replaced by: Jordanian dinar (Jordan and West Bank); Egyptian pound (All-Palestine Protectorate)(Gaza); Israeli pound (Israel)
- User(s): Mandatory Palestine (1 Nov 1927 – 15 May 1948); Emirate of Transjordan (1 Nov 1927 – 25 May 1946); Jordan (25 May 1946 – 30 September 1950); Israel (15 May 1948 – 23 June 1952) (Kingdom of Hejaz) All-Palestine (22 September 1948 – April 1951); West Bank (1 December 1948 – 30 September 1950)

Issuance
- Central bank: Palestine Currency Board
- Printer: Thomas De La Rue
- This infobox shows the latest status before this currency was rendered obsolete.

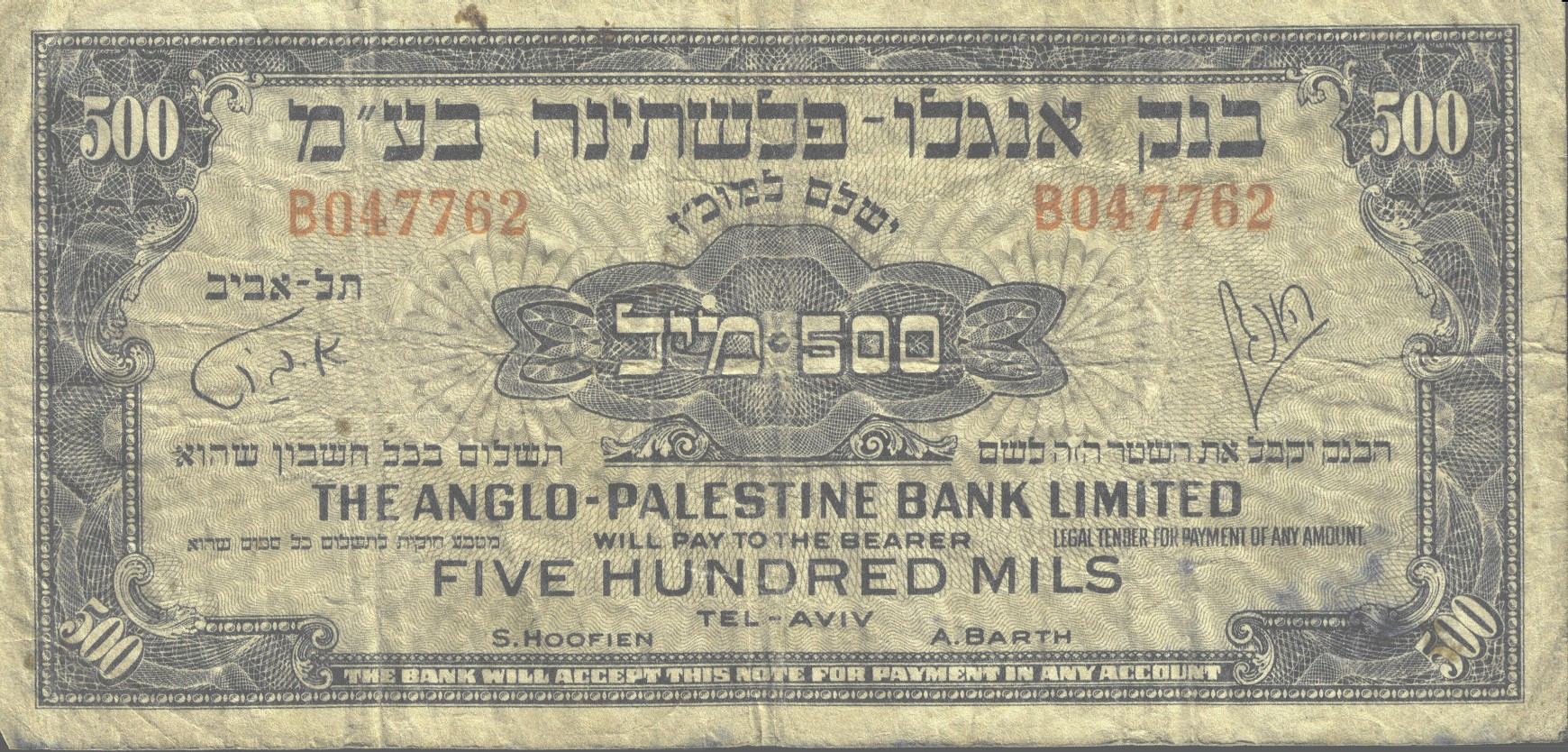
A 500 mil (£P1/2) note issued by the Anglo-Palestine Bank in Jaffa in 1948.

The Palestine pound or Palestine lira (Arabic: جُنَيْه فِلَسْطَينِيّ [junayh filastini]; Hebrew: פונט פלשתינאי [funt' palestinā'iy] or לירה ארץ-ישראלית [lira eretz israelit] or לירה פלשתינאית [lira palestināy'it]; symbol: £P), was the currency of the British Mandate of Palestine from 1 November 1927 to 14 May 1948, and of the State of Israel between 15 May 1948 and 23 June 1952, until it was replaced with the Israeli pound.

The Palestine pound was also the currency of Transjordan until 1949 when it was replaced by the Jordanian dinar, and remained in usage in the West Bank of Jordan until 1950. In the Gaza Strip, the Palestine pound continued to circulate until April 1951, when it was replaced back with the Egyptian pound.

== History ==
Until 1918, Palestine was an integral part of the Ottoman Empire and therefore used its currency, the Ottoman lira. During 1917 and 1918, Palestine was occupied by the British army, who set up a military administration. The official currency was the Egyptian pound, which had been first introduced into Egypt in 1834, but several other currencies were legal tender at fixed exchange rates that were vigorously enforced. After the establishment of a civil administration in 1921, the High Commissioner Herbert Samuel ordered that from 22 January 1921 only Egyptian currency and the British gold sovereign would be legal tender.

Palestine Currency Order 1927
- Order in Council
- Privy Council of the United Kingdom
- Citation: SR&O 1927/91
- Introduced by: Leo Amery MP Secretary of State for the Colonies
- Territorial extent: Mandatory Palestine

Dates
- Made: 7 February 1927
Other legislation
Made under	Foreign Jurisdiction Act 1890

Text of statute as originally enacted

In 1926, the British Secretary of State for the Colonies appointed a Palestine Currency Board to introduce a local currency. It was based in London and chaired by Percy G. Ezechiel, with a Currency Officer resident in Palestine. The board decided that the new currency would be called the Palestine pound, 1:1 with sterling and divided into 1,000 mils. The £P1 gold coin would contain 123.27447 grains of standard gold. The enabling legislation was the Palestine Currency Order 1927 (SR&O 1927/91), signed by the king in February 1927. The Palestine pound became legal tender on 1 November 1927. The Egyptian pound (at the fixed rate of £P1 = £E0.975) and the British gold sovereign remained legal tender until 1 March 1928.

The Palestine Currency Order 1927 explicitly excluded Transjordan from its application, but the Government of Transjordan decided to adopt the Palestine pound at the same time as Palestine did. The Egyptian pound remained legal tender in Transjordan until 1930.

All the denominations were trilingual in Arabic, English and Hebrew.

It so happened that the new Palestinian currency was released, which was a great ordeal. The Palestinian currency which was coined especially for Palestine, and issued both in banknotes and coins, had the phrase “the land of Israel” written on it in Hebrew. Despite this hint, we accepted it, and the Arabs of Palestine dealt in it in what was almost an acknowledgment that Palestine was the land of Israel.

— Wasif Jawhariyyeh, The Storyteller of Jerusalem, page 698

The Currency Board was dissolved in May 1948, with the end of the British Mandate, but the Palestinian pound continued in circulation for transitional periods:

- Israel adopted the Israeli lira in 1952. In August 1948, new banknotes were issued by the Anglo-Palestine Bank, owned by the Jewish Agency and based in London.
- Jordan adopted the Jordanian dinar in 1949.
- In the West Bank, the Palestine pound continued to circulate until 1950, when the West Bank was annexed by Jordan, and the Jordanian dinar became legal tender there. The Jordanian dinar is still legal tender in the West Bank along with the Israeli shekel.
- In the Gaza Strip, the Palestine pound continued to circulate until April 1951, when it was replaced by the Egyptian pound, three years after the Egyptian army took control of the territory.

Since the mid-1980s, the primary currencies used in the West Bank have been the shekel and the Jordanian dinar. The shekel is used for most transactions, especially retail, while the dinar is used more for savings and durable goods transactions. The US dollar is also sometimes used for savings and for purchasing foreign goods. The dollar is used by the overwhelming majority of transactions overseen by the Palestinian Monetary Authority (Palestine's nascent central bank), which only represent a fraction of all transactions conducted in Palestine or by Palestinians.

The shekel is the main currency in Gaza. Under Egyptian rule (1948–1956), Gaza mainly used the Egyptian pound. When Israel occupied the Gaza Strip during the 1956 Suez Crisis, the military administration made the Israeli lira (the predecessor to the shekel) the only legal currency in Gaza in a 3 December decree, and implemented a favorable exchange rate to remove all Egyptian pounds from circulation. As a result, the lira and then the shekel became the dominant currency in Gaza, a situation that was reinforced in 1967 by the Israeli occupation of Gaza following the Six-Day War.

Under Article IV of the Protocol on Economic Relations, the Palestinians are not allowed to independently introduce a separate Palestinian currency. At the same time, the use of two currencies has the potential to increase the costs and inconvenience arising from fluctuating exchange rates.

== Coins ==
In 1927, coins were introduced in denominations of 1, 2, 5, 10, 20, 50 and 100 mils. The 1 and 2 mil were struck in bronze, whilst the 5, 10 and 20 mil were holed, cupro-nickel coins, except for during World War II, when they were also minted in bronze. The coin of 10 mils was also called a grush. The 50 and 100 mil coins were struck in .720 silver.

The last coins were issued for circulation in 1946, with virtually all 1947 dated coins being melted down. The few surviving 1947 coins are some of the rarest coins in the world. The British Museum has one of only the few copies of the 1947 coins.

Palestine pound Coinage
Issued by the Palestine currency Board
Image	Value	Technical parameters			Description			Date of first issue	Dated years of issue
Image	Value	Diameter	Mass	Composition	Edge	Obverse	Reverse	Date of first issue	Dated years of issue
	1 mil	21 mm	3.23 g	Bronze	Plain	"Palestine" in Arabic, English, and Hebrew, year of minting.	Value in Arabic, English, and Hebrew, olive sprig	1927	1927, 1935, 1937, 1939, 1940, 1941, 1942, 1943, 1944, 1946
	2 mils	28 mm	7.77 g	Bronze	Plain	"Palestine" in Arabic, English, and Hebrew, year of minting.	Value in Arabic, English, and Hebrew, olive sprig	1927	1927, 1941, 1942, 1945, 1946
	5 mils	20 mm	2.91 g	Cupro-nickel	Plain	"Palestine" in Arabic, English, and Hebrew, year of minting.	Value in Arabic, English, and Hebrew	1927	1927, 1934, 1935, 1939, 1941, 1946
	5 mils	20 mm	2.9	Bronze	Plain	"Palestine" in Arabic, English, and Hebrew, year of minting.	Value in Arabic, English, and Hebrew	1942	1942, 1944
	10 mils	27 mm	6.47 g	Cupro-nickel	Plain	"Palestine" in Arabic, English, and Hebrew, year of minting.	Value in Arabic, English, and Hebrew	1927	1927, 1933, 1934, 1935, 1937, 1939, 1940, 1941, 1942, 1946
	10 mils	27 mm	6.47	Bronze	Plain	"Palestine" in Arabic, English, and Hebrew, year of minting.	Value in Arabic, English, and Hebrew	1942	1942, 1943
	20 mils	30.5 mm	11.33 g	Cupro-nickel	Plain	"Palestine" in Arabic, English, and Hebrew, year of minting.	Value in Arabic, English, and Hebrew	1927	1927, 1933, 1934, 1935, 1940, 1941
	20 mils	30.5 mm	11.3	Bronze	Plain	"Palestine" in Arabic, English, and Hebrew, year of minting.	Value in Arabic, English, and Hebrew	1942	1942, 1944
	50 mils	23.6 mm	5.83 g	720‰ Silver	Reeded	"Palestine" in Arabic, English, and Hebrew, year of minting, olive sprig.	Value in Arabic, English, and Hebrew	1927	1927, 1931, 1933, 1934, 1935, 1939, 1940, 1942, 1943
	100 mils	29 mm	11.66 g	720‰ Silver	Reeded	"Palestine" in Arabic, English, and Hebrew, year of minting, olive sprig.	Value in Arabic, English, and Hebrew	1927	1927, 1931, 1933, 1934, 1935, 1939, 1940, 1942, 1943
Issued by the State of Israel
Image	Value	Technical parameters			Description			Date of first issue	Dated years of issue
Image	Value	Diameter	Mass	Composition	Edge	Obverse	Reverse	Date of first issue	Dated years of issue
	1 pruta	21 mm	1.3 g	Aluminum	Plain	Anchor; "Israel" in Hebrew and Arabic. The design is based on a coin of Alexander Jannaeus (r. c. 103–76 BCE– ).	The denomination "1 Pruta" and the date in Hebrew; two stylized olive branches around the rim.	25 October 1950	5709 (1949)
	5 pruta	20 mm	3.2 g	Bronze	Plain	Four-stringed lyre; "Israel" in Hebrew and Arabic. The design is based on a coin from the Bar-Kochba Revolt (132–135 CE).	The denomination "5 Pruta" and the date in Hebrew; two stylized olive branches around the rim.	28 December 1950	5709 (1949)
	10 pruta	27 mm	6.1g	Bronze	Plain	Two-handled amphora; "Israel" in Hebrew and Arabic. The design is based on a coin from the Bar-Kochba Revolt (132–135 CE).	The denomination "10 Pruta" and the date in Hebrew; two stylized olive branches around the rim.	4 January 1950	5709 (1949)
	25 mil	30 mm	3.8 g	Aluminum	Plain	Cluster of grapes, based on coins struck during the Bar-Kochba Revolt (132–135 CE); "Israel" in Hebrew above and in Arabic below.	The denomination "25 Mil" in Hebrew and Arabic; date in Hebrew below; two stylized olive branches around, based on coins struck during the Bar-Kochba Revolt (132-135 CE).	6 April 1949	5708 (1948), 5709 (1949)
	25 pruta	19.5 mm	2.8 g	Cupro-nickel	Reeded	Cluster of grapes, based on coins struck during the Bar-Kochba Revolt (132–135 CE); "Israel" in Hebrew above and in Arabic below.	Value and date in Hebrew within wreath.	4 January 1950	5709 (1949)
	50 pruta	23.5 mm	5.69 g	Cupro-nickel	Reeded	Branch of grape leaves.	Value and date within wreath made up of two stylized olive branches that for a circle around perimeter.	11 May 1949	5709 (1949)
	100 pruta	28.5 mm	11.3 g	Cupro-nickel	Reeded	Date palm tree with seven branches and two bunches of dates. Country name is listed in Hebrew and Arabic.	Value and date in Hebrew within wreath of stylized olive branches.	25 May 1949	5709 (1949)
	250 pruta	32.2 mm	14.1 g	Cupro-nickel	Reeded	Three wheat stalks; "Israel" in Hebrew and Arabic. The design is based on a coin minted during the Great Jewish Revolt (66–73/74 CE).	The denomination "250 Pruta" and the date in Hebrew; two stylized olive branches around the rim.	11 October 1950	5709 (1949)
These images are to scale at 2.5 pixels per millimetre. For table standards, see the coin specification table.

== Banknotes ==
On 1 November 1927, banknotes were introduced by the Palestine Currency Board in denominations of 500 mils, £P1, £P5, £P10, £P50 and £P100. Notes were issued with dates as late as 15 August 1945.

Palestine pound Banknotes
Issued by the Palestine currency Board
Image		Value	Dimensions	Main Colour	Description			Date of first issue	Quantity circulated at the end of the Mandate
Obverse	Reverse	Value	Dimensions	Main Colour	Obverse	Reverse	Watermark	Date of first issue	Quantity circulated at the end of the Mandate
500 mils		500 mils	127 × 76 mm	Purple	Rachel's Tomb	Citadel and Tower of David	Olive sprig	1 September 1927	1,872,811
1 pound obverse		£P1	166 × 89 mm	Yellowish green	Dome of the Rock	Citadel and Tower of David	Olive sprig	1 September 1927	9,413,578
		£P5	191 × 102 mm	Red	Tower of Ramla	Citadel and Tower of David	Olive sprig	1 September 1927	3,909,230
10 pounds		£P10	191 × 102 mm	Blue	Tower of Ramla	Citadel and Tower of David	Olive sprig	1 September 1927	2,004,128
		£P50	191 × 102 mm	Purple	Tower of Ramla	Citadel and Tower of David	Olive sprig	1 September 1927	20,577
100 pounds		£P100	191 × 102 mm	Green	Tower of Ramla	Citadel and Tower of David	Olive sprig	1 September 1927	1,587
"Palestine" in Arabic, English.
Issued by the Anglo-Palestine Bank (State of Israel)
Image		Value	Dimensions	Main Colour	Description			Date of	
Obverse	Reverse	Value	Dimensions	Main Colour	Obverse	Reverse		Issue	Ceased to be legal tender
		500 mils	148 x 72 mm	Grey-pink	Guilloches; the denomination and "The Anglo-Palestine Bank Limited" in Hebrew and English.	Guilloches; the denomination and "The Anglo-Palestine Bank Limited" in Arabic and English.		18 August 1948	23 June 1952
		£P1	100 x 75 mm	Blue-green	Guilloches; the denomination and "The Anglo-Palestine Bank Limited" in Hebrew and English.	Guilloches; the denomination and "The Anglo-Palestine Bank Limited" in Arabic and English.		18 August 1948	23 June 1952
		£P5	105 x 68 mm	Brown	Guilloches; the denomination and "The Anglo-Palestine Bank Limited" in Hebrew and English.	Guilloches; the denomination and "The Anglo-Palestine Bank Limited" in Arabic and English.		18 August 1948	23 June 1952
		£P10	150 x 80 mm	Red	Guilloches; the denomination and "The Anglo-Palestine Bank Limited" in Hebrew and English.	Guilloches; the denomination and "The Anglo-Palestine Bank Limited" in Arabic and English.		18 August 1948	23 June 1952
		£P50	159 x 84 mm	Violet	Guilloches; the denomination and "The Anglo-Palestine Bank Limited" in Hebrew and English.	Guilloches; the denomination and "The Anglo-Palestine Bank Limited" in Arabic and English.		18 August 1948	23 June 1952

The £P100 note was equivalent to 40 months’ wages of a skilled worker in Palestine. At the end of 1947, five months before the end of the British Mandate, there were 1,590 £P100 notes in circulation, out of a total circulation of £P40.6 million in notes and £P1.5 million in coins.

== See also ==
- British currency in the Middle East
- Economy of Israel
- Economy of Palestine
- Economy of Jordan
