= Old Israeli shekel =

Currency of Israel between 1980 and 1985

(Old) Israeli shekel
שקל (Hebrew); شيكل or شيقل (Arabic); IS
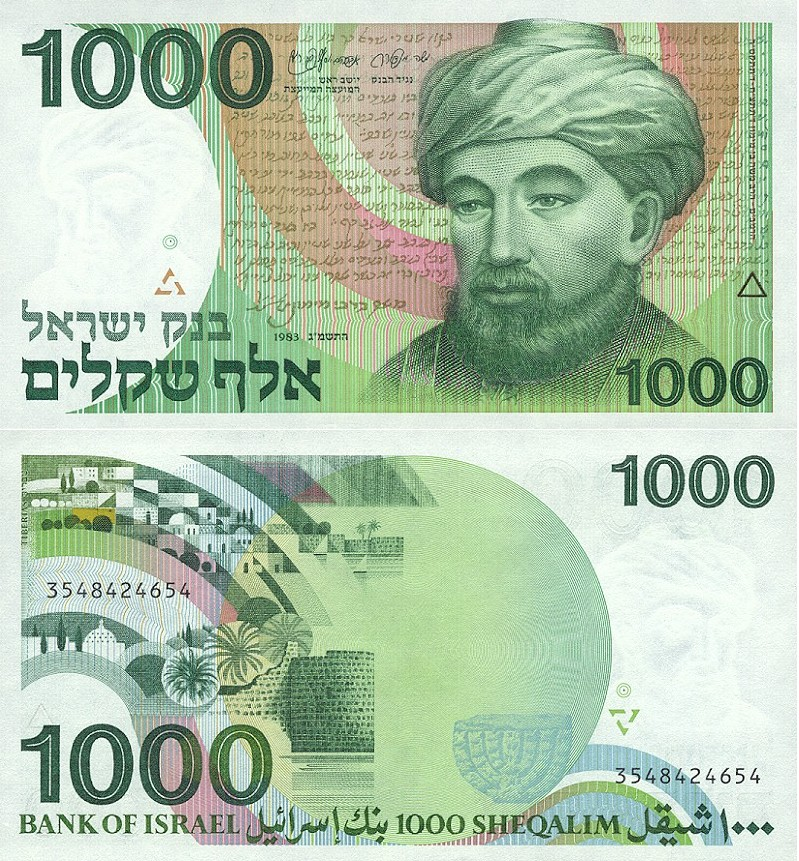
- IS 1000 banknote (obverse and reverse) issued in 1983

ISO 4217
- Code: ILR

Unit
- Unit: shekel
- Plural: shqalim

Denominations
- Subunit
- 1/100: new agora
- Plural
- new agora: new agorot
- Banknotes: IS 1, IS 5, IS 10, IS 50, IS 100, IS 500, IS 1000, IS 5000, IS 10,000
- Coins: 1, 5, 10 new agorot, IS1/2, IS 1, IS 5, IS 10, IS 50, IS 100

Demographics
- Date of introduction: 24 February 1980
- Replaced: Israeli pound
- Date of withdrawal: 31 December 1985
- Replaced by: Israeli new shekel
- User(s): Israel (1980–1985)

Issuance
- Central bank: Bank of Israel
- Website: www.boi.org.il

Valuation
- Inflation: 1000% (1984)
- This infobox shows the latest status before this currency was rendered obsolete.

The old Israeli shekel, then known as the shekel (Hebrew: שקל, formally sheqel, pl. שקלים, Sheqalim; Arabic: شيكل, šēkal, formerly Arabic: شيقل, šēqal until 2014; code ILR), was the currency of Israel between 24 February 1980 and 31 December 1985. It was replaced by the Israeli new shekel at a ratio of 1,000:1 on 1 January 1986. The old shekel was short-lived due to its hyperinflation. The old shekel was subdivided into 100 new agorot (אגורות חדשות). The shekel sign was used, although it was more commonly denominated as S or IS. As of December 2024, this symbol does not exist in Unicode.

The old Israeli shekel replaced the Israeli pound (IL), which had been used until 24 February 1980, at the rate of IS 1 shekel to IL10.

== History ==
Development of a new currency to be known as the shekel (properly, sheqel) was approved by the Israeli Knesset on 4 June 1969. The governors of the Bank of Israel did not consider the time ripe until November 1977, when studies for its implementation began. Prime Minister Menachem Begin and Minister of Finance Simcha Erlich approved a proposal to redenominate the Israeli pound in May 1978; the proposal called for the currency to be exactly similar except for the removal of a zero from the inflated pound and agorot denominations.

The shekel and new agora became legal tender on 22 February 1980 and went into circulation two days later. The official exchange rate at the time of introduction was US$1 = IS 3.89 = IL38.88. Initial denominations were IS 1, IS 5, IS 10, and IS 50, but over the next five years inflation led to another five: IS 100, IS 500, IS 1,000, IS 5,000, and IS 10,000. New coin and bill designs were selected through competitions among graphic designers. Beginning with the IS 500 issue, the size of the notes was standardized (76 mm × 138 mm or 3 in × 5 in), and the denominations were differentiated by color and design. A transparent section was added to discourage counterfeiting, and elements for the blind were added.

Inflationary pressure did not ease. By the end of 1980, the shekel had already lost about half of its value (US$1 = IS 7.55). In 1981, the value of Israeli currency continued to fall, reaching IS 15.60 per U.S. dollar at the end of the year. At the end of 1982, the exchange rate was IS 33.65 = US$1 and was falling still. The following shows the official exchange rate of one U.S. dollar in specific periods of time at the end of the period:

- June 1983: IS 47.52
- December 1983: IS 107.77
- March 1984: IS 153.26
- June 1984: IS 236.40
- September 1984: IS 401.34
- December 1984: IS 638.71
- March 1985: IS 858.50
- June 1985: IS 1262.40

By August 1985, the exchange rate for one U.S. dollar reached IS 1500. The new Israeli shekel replaced the shekel following its hyperinflation and the enactment of the economic stabilization plan of 1985, which brought inflation under control. It became the currency of Israel on 4 September 1985, removing three zeros from the old notes.

The old shekel is no longer in circulation, has been demonetized, and is not exchanged for current legal tender by the Bank of Israel.

== Coins ==
The initial series of coins in 1980 were for the denominations of 1, 5, and 10 new agorot and IS 1/2. These preserved the appearance of similar coins under the pound but were worth 10 times as much. The initial runs were struck at foreign mints to preserve the secrecy of the coming currency conversion. The IS 1 coin was introduced in 1981; IS 5 and IS 10 coins in 1982; and IS 50 and IS 100 coins in 1984.

The 1 and 5 new agorot coins were aluminum; the 10 new agorot and IS 1/2, IS 1, and IS 100 coins cupronickel; the IS 5 and IS 50 coins an alloy of copper, aluminum, and nickel; and the IS 10 was cupro-aluminum.

Old shekel coins
Image	Value	Technical parameters			Description		Date of	
Image	Value	Diameter (mm)	Mass (g)	Composition	Obverse	Reverse	issue	withdrawal
	1 new agora	15	0.6	aluminium 97%, magnesium 3%	Palm tree, "Israel" in Hebrew and Arabic	Value, date	February 24, 1980	April 9, 1986
	5 new agorot	18.5	0.9	aluminium 97%, magnesium 3%	The state emblem, "Israel" in Hebrew, Arabic and English	Value, date	February 24, 1980	April 9, 1986
	10 new agorot	16	2.1	copper 92%, nickel 8%	Three pomegranates, the state emblem, "Israel" in Hebrew, Arabic and English	Value, date	February 24, 1980	April 9, 1986
	IS1/2	20	3	copper 75%, nickel 25%	Lion, the state emblem, "Israel" in Hebrew, Arabic and English	Value, date, two stars	February 24, 1980	April 9, 1986
	IS 1	23	5	copper 75%, nickel 25%	Cup, "Shekel" in Hebrew	Value, date, the state emblem, "Israel" in Hebrew, Arabic and English	January 22, 1981	April 9, 1986
	IS 5	24	6	copper 92%, aluminium 6%, nickel 2%	Double cornucopia with pendant ribbon (based on image on ancient Judean double-prutah coins issued during the leadership of the High Priest John Hyrcanus); the state emblem, "Israel" in Hebrew, Arabic and English	Value, date, two stars	October 9, 1981	April 9, 1986
	IS 10	26	8	copper 75%, aluminium 25%	Ancient galley on which Herod Archelaus sailed to Rome and was awarded much of the Judean kingdom and the title of ethnarch (as depicted on ancient Judean double-prutah issued during his reign); the state emblem, "Israel" in Hebrew, Arabic and English	Value, date, two stars	February 25, 1982	April 9, 1986
	IS 50	28	9	copper 92%, aluminium 6%, nickel 2%	Replica of a coin, the state emblem, "Israel" in Hebrew, Arabic and English	Value, date, two stars	August 3, 1984	April 9, 1986
	IS 100	29	10.8	copper 75%, nickel 25%	Replica of a coin issued by Antigonus II Mattathias with the seven-branched candelabrum, the state emblem, "Israel" in Hebrew, Arabic and English	Value, date	February 5, 1984	April 9, 1986
These images are to scale at 2.5 pixels per millimetre. For table standards, see the coin specification table.

- Note that all dates on Israeli coins are given in the Hebrew calendar and are written in Hebrew numerals.

== Banknotes ==
The initial series of banknotes in 1980 were for the denominations of IS 1, IS 5, IS 10, and IS 50 and preserved the appearance of the IL10, IL 50, IL 100, and IL 500 notes that they replaced.

Subsequent issues added the denominations of IS 100, IS 500, IS 1,000, IS 5,000, and IS 10,000.

Value	Size	Color	Obverse	Reverse	Image	Issued	Withdrawn
IS 1	135×76 mm	purple	Moses Montefiore with Mishkenot Sha'ananim in background	Jaffa Gate		24 February 1980	September 4, 1986
IS 5	141×76 mm	green	Chaim Weizmann, Weizmann Institute of Science in background	Damascus Gate		24 February 1980	September 4, 1986
IS 10	147×76 mm	blue	Theodor Herzl, entrance to Mount Herzl in background	Zion Gate		24 February 1980	September 4, 1986
IS 50	153×76 mm	Ivory-Brown	David Ben-Gurion at the library in Sde Boker	Golden Gate		24 February 1980	September 4, 1986
IS 100	159×76 mm	Orange-brown	Ze'ev Jabotinsky	Herod's Gate		December 11, 1980	September 4, 1986
IS 500	138×76 mm	red	Edmond James de Rothschild, and farmers	Bunch of grapes		December 1, 1982	September 4, 1986
IS 1,000	138×76 mm	green	Maimonides	Tiberias where Maimonides is buried; Ancient stone lamp		November 17, 1983	September 4, 1986
IS 5,000	138×76 mm	blue	Levi Eshkol	Pipe carrying water, symbolizing the national carrier, fields and barren land in background		August 9, 1984	September 4, 1986
IS 10,000	138×76 mm	orange	Golda Meir	Picture of Golda Meir in the crowd, in front of the Moscow Choral Synagogue, as she arrived in Moscow as Israel's ambassador in 1948		November 27, 1984	September 4, 1986
These images are to scale at 0.7 pixel per millimetre (18 pixel per inch). For table standards, see the banknote specification table.

== See also ==
- Bank of Israel
- Economy of Israel
