= Israeli pruta =

Currency denomination

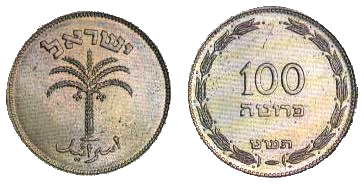
100 Prutah coin, 1949

Pruta (Hebrew: פרוטה, plural: prutot) was a denomination of currency in Israel before 1960.

== History ==
The pruta was introduced shortly after the establishment of the state of Israel, as the 1000th part of the Israeli pound. It replaced the mil, which was the 1000th part of the Palestine pound, a currency issued by the British Mandate of Palestine prior to May 1948.

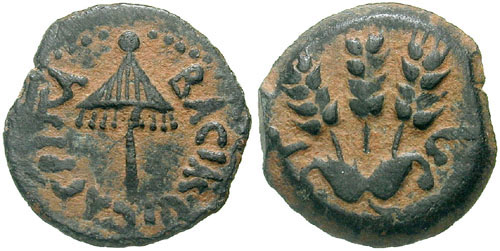
Pruta from the reign of Agrippa I

The word pruta was borrowed from Mishnaic Hebrew, in which it meant "a coin of smaller value". This word was probably derived originally from an Aramaic word with the same meaning. The pruta was abolished in 1960, when the Israeli government decided to change the subdivision of the Israeli pound into 100 agorot. This move was necessary due to the constant devaluation of the Israeli pound, which rendered coins smaller than 10 prutot redundant.

This pruta should not be confused with the halachic pruta, which is the minimal value of money for a variety of halachic applications—among them, the minimal value one is obligated to return if stolen, the minimal value needed to effect a marriage, and the minimal investment needed to be considered an investor (it is equivalent to 0.025 grams of pure silver).

== See also ==
- Prutah
- Economy of Israel
