= Emblem of Israel =

- Armiger: Israel
- Adopted: 10 February 1949; 77 years ago
- Motto: ישראל (Israel)
- Constituent parts: Menorah, olive branches

The emblem of Israel (Hebrew: סֵמֶל מְדִינַת יִשְׂרָאֵל, romanized: Sēmel Medīnat Yīsrāʾēl) depicts a temple menorah surrounded by an olive branch on each side, with the word Israel written in Hebrew (ישראל) below it without niqqud. While it is commonly displayed in blue and white, the emblem has appeared in alternative colour combinations depending on the use, such as on the Israeli Presidential Standard (see below).

== History ==
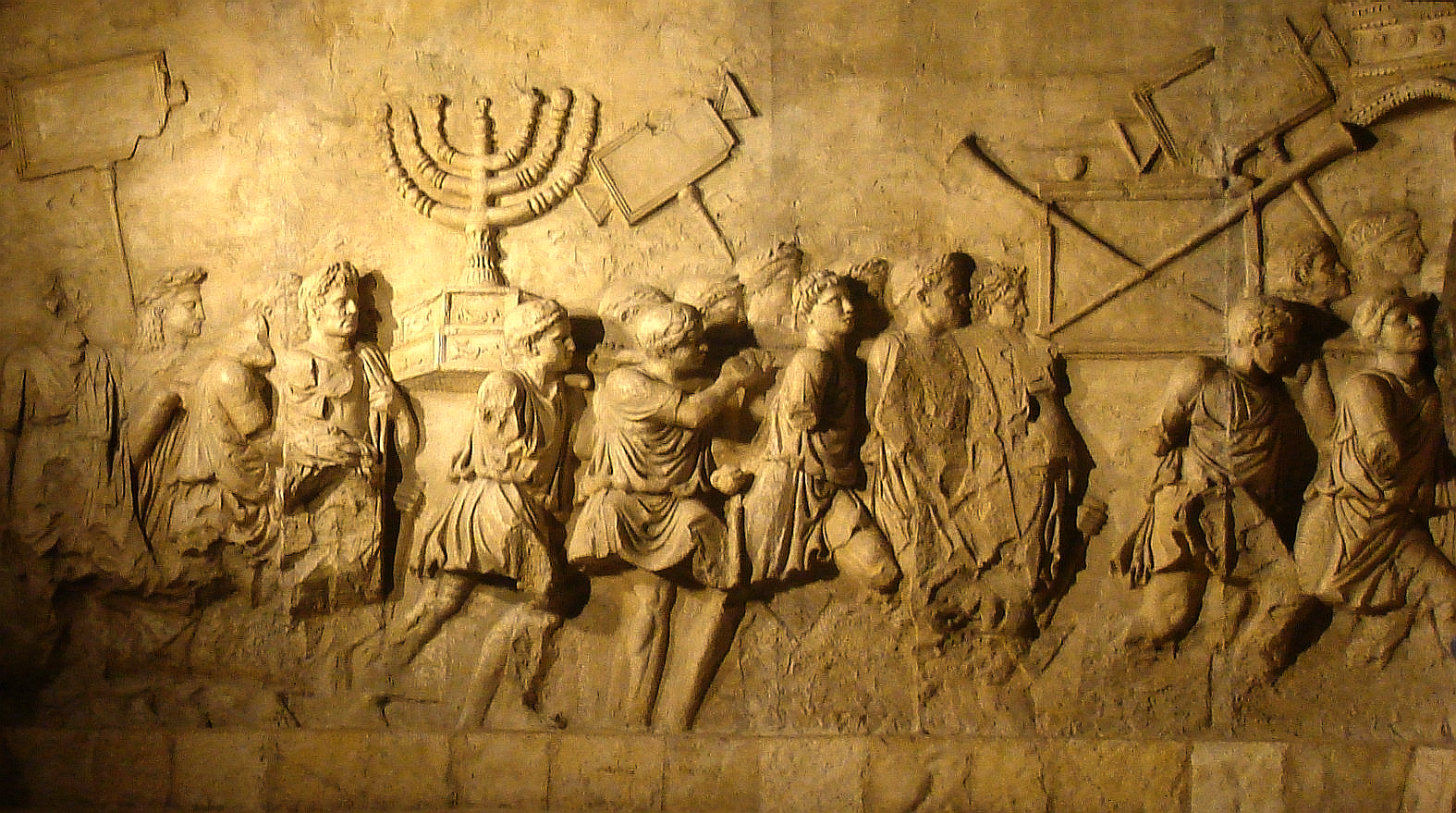
The emblem features a menorah captured by Romans during the First Jewish-Roman War, as depicted on the Arch of Titus.

The State of Israel adopted the symbol after a design competition held in 1948. The design is based on the winning entry submitted by Gabriel and Maxim Shamir's proposal, with elements taken from other submissions, including entries from Oteh Walisch, W. Struski, Itamar David, Yerachmiel Schechter, and Willie Wind, whose entry won the first design competition. The emblem was officially adopted on February 10, 1949.

== Symbolism ==
The image used on the emblem is based on a depiction of the menorah on the Arch of Titus. The menorah was used in the ancient Temple in Jerusalem and has been a symbol of Judaism since ancient times. It symbolizes universal enlightenment, based on what is written in Isaiah 60: "Nations will come to your light, and kings to the brightness of your dawn".

According to Allon Gal,

The menorah (the seven-branched candelabrum), described in the Bible as a prominent feature of the Tabernacle erected by the People of Israel in the wilderness, as well as in the Jerusalem Temple, had for centuries served as a Jewish symbol in synagogues, and had been historically used as an emblem by a variety of Zionist organisations and associations. Eventually, it was adopted as the symbol of the State of Israel. Significantly, the design of the menorah, now flanked by two olive branches symbolising both peace and prosperity, is based on the representation on the Arch-of-Titus; this adoption expresses the idea of Judaea Resurrecta – the restoration of Jewish sovereignty, about 2000 years after the last Hasmonean prince used the same symbol on his coins (Strauss 1972). At the same time, the menorah is also the symbol of light, a motif conspicuous in some major Zionist and Israeli historical ethno-symbols.

The emblem may also be based on the vision of the biblical prophet Zechariah, 4:1-7, where he describes an angel showing him a menorah flanked by two olive trees, one on each side.

== Usage ==
The following gallery shows various contexts in which the emblem is used:

Standard of the president of Israel

Seal of Mossad displays the Menorah from the emblem

Emblem as coat of arms on Israeli passport

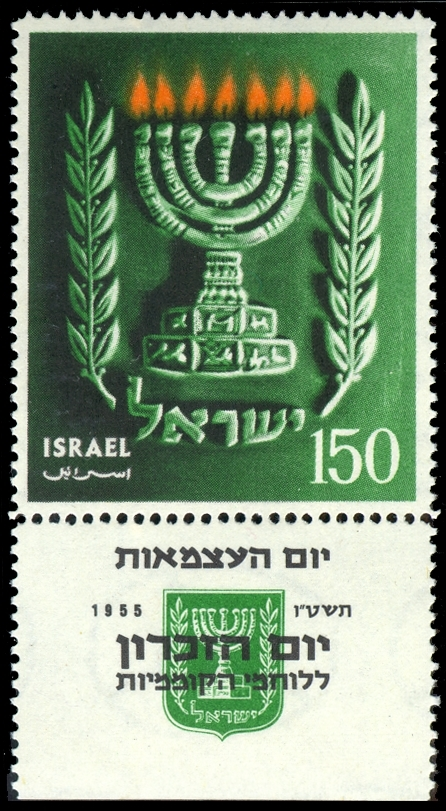
Independence Day stamp with emblem and inscription "Memorial Day for the Fighters for Independence" (1955)

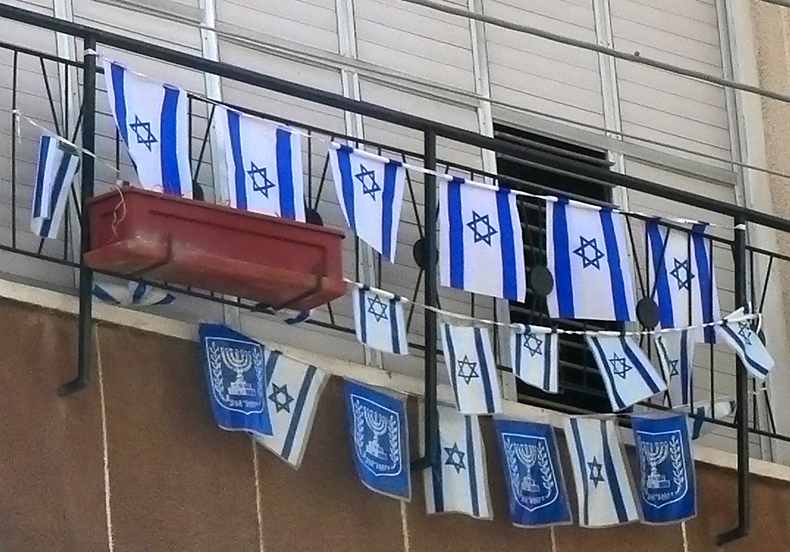
Flag and emblem of Israel banners decorate a house on Israel Independence Day (2007)

== See also ==
- National symbols of Israel
- Arch of Titus
- Menorah (Temple)
- Jewish heraldry
