= Barak Cohen =

Israeli lawyer

Haim Barak Cohen
- חיים ברק כהן
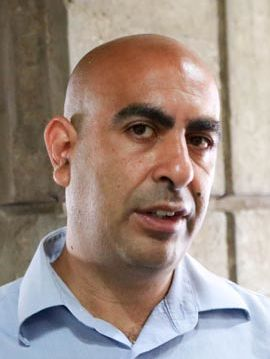
- Born: 1 February 1977 (age 49)
- Occupation: Lawyer
- Known for: Social activism

Haim Barak Cohen, commonly known as Barak Cohen (born 1 February 1977) is an Israeli lawyer, one of the founders of the "Ba'im LaBanka'im" citizen protest group, who is best known for his activism against public figures and financial institutions. Leading up to the 2021 Israeli legislative election, Cohen was chosen to lead the political party "Demokratit – Herut, Shivyon ve'Arvut Hadadit" which was created following the protests against Israel's 35th government (2020–2021).

== Biography ==
Barak Cohen was born in the Mazkeret Moshe neighborhood of Jerusalem. His father, Hertzel Cohen, was active in the Israeli Black Panthers and later deputy chair of the Mevaseret Zion local council. His grandparents were Kurdish, Egyptian, and Yemenite Jews who immigrated to Israel. Cohen studied at the Ben Shemen Youth Village. He did not enlist in the IDF for health reasons. He completed a bachelor's degree in law at the IDC Herzliya (now Reichman University) and after graduating practiced criminal law.

Cohen has been a vegan since 2017.

Since 2020, he has been one of the presenters of the television program "Pe'arim Shel Aherim" on the program "From the Other Side with Guy Zohar" on the Kan 11 news channel.

== Activism ==
=== "Ba'im LaBanka'im" ("[Citizens] Coming to the Bankers") ===
Between 2000 and 2014, 11 writs of execution were filed against Cohen to the amount of 224,000 NIS, mainly due to a loan of 150,000 NIS taken from Bank Leumi for the purchase of a car.

According to Cohen, as part of the measures taken by Bank Leumi representatives to collect the debt, they approached his life partner to repay the interest that Cohen himself had accrued on a debt of several tens of thousands of shekels, and attempted to confiscate her property, including a piano that belonged to her before she knew him. Cohen claimed that he tried to reach an agreement with the bank's representatives and filed a declaratory judgment that it was his partner's property. The judge granted the request and declared a stay of proceedings, but while the proceedings were delayed, the bank's employees submitted a request to initiate proceedings to continue collecting through the foreclosure of his partner's property. These measures prompted Cohen to begin his campaign against the banks.

In October 2014, Cohen published a personal post on Facebook marking the founding of "Ba'im LaBanka'im" ["Coming to the Bankers". He set up a dedicated Facebook page and a website called "Ba'im LaBanka'im" ["Coming to the Bankers"] where he posted protests against figures from the Israeli banking sector. The group began protests against senior officials in the banking system, including the CEO of Bank Leumi, Rakefet Russak-Aminoach, and the CEO of Bank Hapoalim, Zion Kenan, and their families. As part of the activity, Cohen chanted slogans in condemnation of Russak-Aminoach near the high school that her daughter attended, and distributed fliers condemning Rakefet Russak-Aminoach in the schoolyard.

The court issued a restraining order to Cohen and his comrades from Russak-Aminoach and Kenan, for stalking. In May 2019, Cohen pleaded guilty in a plea bargain to invasion of privacy as part of the "Ba'im LaBanka'im" protest actions, and in November 2019 he was sentenced to six months probation and a fine of 20,000 NIS. In May 2017, the Disciplinary Tribunal of the Israel Bar Association decided to suspend Cohen for a year and a half from practicing law, following an indictment filed against him and attributing to him threats and harassment toward the heads of the banking system. Cohen appealed this decision to the district court, and later filed an application for leave to appeal to the Israeli Supreme Court, but his application was denied, and his suspension remained unchanged. In 2015, Barak Cohen and his comrades from "Ba'im LaBanka'im" were ranked 77th on TheMarker magazine's list of the 100 most influential Israelis.

=== Political Protests ===
Cohen strongly criticized various public figures and politicians, especially on Twitter. In April 2017, Cohen was investigated and received a warning from the authorities after he posted a video in which he verbally attacked Minister Miri Regev while she was walking down the street with her family. In November 2017, he uploaded a video in which he verbally attacked Labor Party chair Avi Gabay, claiming that he was "sending asylum-seekers to their deaths", and calling him derogatory terms.

In December 2017, Barak Cohen was chosen as one of the People of the Year by Time Out Tel Aviv magazine, partially because of his activities in the Rothschild 22 lobby, a hotel lobby which was officially designated as a public space by the municipality.

In July 2019, Cohen documented himself shouting insults at Avner Netanyahu, the prime minister's son, while the latter patronized a restaurant. In response, Avner Netanyahu filed a complaint with the police against Cohen, which was investigated by the police. In August 2019, the court issued a restraining order against Cohen from Avner Netanyahu in accordance with the Prevention of Threatening Harassment Law, until February 2020.

In July 2020, Cohen disrupted an interview conducted by Shimon Riklin on the planned pipeline with derogatory chants. On 28 April 2021, he interfered with the broadcast of Riklin's program on Channel 20 and was detained for questioning by the police after Smadar Shmueli filed a complaint.

In 2020 Cohen, was also filmed verbally attacking Sheldon Adelson, owner of Israel Hayom, on the street.

In May 2023, Cohen protested Efi Nave's choice to run for the head of Israel Bar Association. Nave was arrested on suspicions of accepting sexual bribe. Barak Cohen went into a Crowdfunding against Efi Nave. Nave ended up losing, and In March 2024, Haaretz published recordings of him ultimately admitting to do appointment in exchange for favors.

=== Music ===
Since 2013 Cohen has released various songs and albums of Mizrahi music with content criticizing public figures. His album "The Sound of a String against the Regime" (Hebrew: צליל מיתר נגד המשטר, Tzlil Meitar Neged HaMishtar) was chosen by the Israeli radio station KZRadio as the 26th top album of 2020.

In 2014, Cohen was involved in an altercation with Alon Hamdani, the intelligence officer of the Moriah police precinct in Jerusalem, due to the legal aid provided by Cohen to the far-right group La Familia. In response, Cohen published the song "Intelligence Officer" (Hebrew: רכז מידע, Rakaz Meida) mocking Hamdani. Following this, Cohen was arrested for questioning. In late 2015, Cohen was interviewed by journalist Guy Lerer for the program "HaTzinor" during which a portion of the song was broadcast; Lerer was later questioned by the police's fraud division. Following the song and other actions of Cohen against Hamdani, Cohen was convicted of insulting a civil servant and of interfering with a police officer while on duty. In January 2018, Cohen was sentenced to 300 hours of community service, fined, and was sentenced to pay 5,000 NIS to Hamdani. Cohen appealed the decision, and the State appealed the leniency of the sentence. Both appeals were rejected. In May 2020, a judge of the District Court of Jerusalem accepted the lawsuit against Cohen and ruled that Cohen was required to compensate Hamdani with 150,000 NIS.
