= Bank Hapoalim =

Israeli bank

Bank Hapoalim B.M.

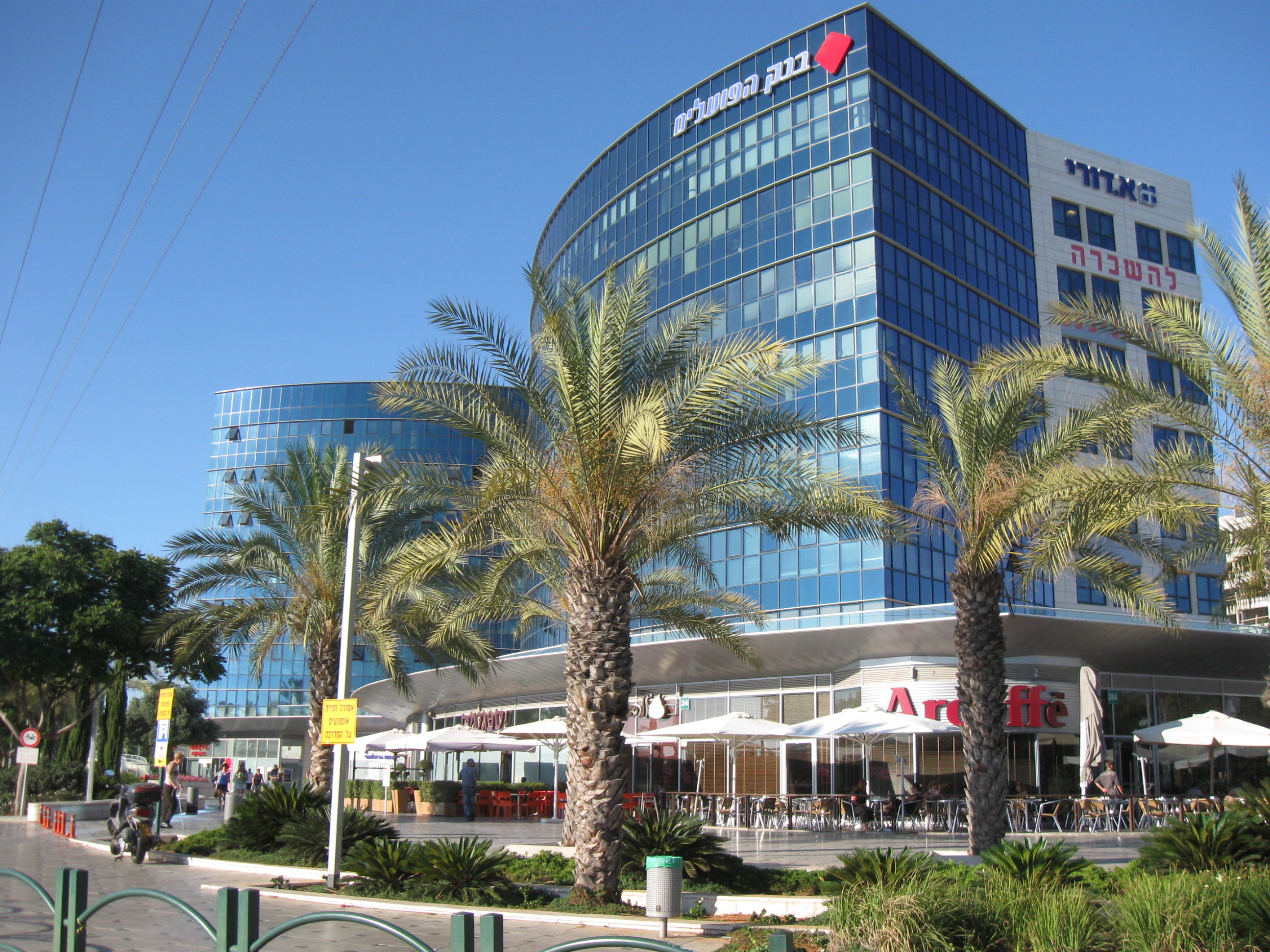
- Bank Hapoalim, Ra'anana
- Type: Public
- Traded as: TASE: POLI
- Industry: Banking, financial services
- Founded: 1921; 105 years ago
- Headquarters: Tel Aviv, Israel
- Key people: Dov Kotler, CEO; Noam Hanegbi, Chairman
- Products: Credit cards, consumer banking, corporate banking, finance and insurance, investment banking, mortgage loans, private banking, private equity, savings, securities, asset management
- Revenue: ▲US$10.8 billion (2021)
- Net income: ▲US$684.6 million (2016)
- Total assets: ▲US$168.1 billion (2021)
- Owner: Shari Arison (15.74%)
- Number of employees: 8,708 (2021)
- Website: bankhapoalim.com

Bank Hapoalim (lit. The Workers' Bank) is one of the largest banks in Israel, established in 1921. As of 2023 this is the second largest bank in Israel in terms of equity. The bank offers a broad range of financial services to retail, corporate, and institutional customers, with a focus on retail banking services. It operates a network of more than 250 branches and offices in Israel and abroad. Bank Hapoalim is a prominent player in the Israeli banking sector, with a significant market share.

The company is traded in the Tel Aviv Stock Exchange under the symbol POLI, and is part of the Tel Aviv 35 Index. Noam Hanegbi was appointed chairman of the board in 2025, and Yadin Antebi was appointed CEO in August 2024, succeeding former CEO Dov Kotler.

== History ==
The bank was established in 1921 by the Histadrut, the Israeli trade union congress (lit. "General Federation of Laborers in the Land of Israel") and the Zionist Organisation.

The bank was owned by the Histadrut until 1983, when it was nationalized following the Bank Stock Crisis. The bank was held by the Israeli government until 1996 when it was sold to a group of investors led by Ted Arison.

The bank has a significant presence in global financial markets. In Israel, it has over 600 ATMs (automated teller machines), 250 bank branches, 7 regional business centers, 22 business branches and industry desks for major corporate customers. The bank's stock is traded on the Tel Aviv Stock Exchange.

At the end of 2015, the bank had 11,930 employees worldwide. Up until 2018, Arison Holdings, led by Shari Arison, owned approximately 20% of Bank Hapoalim's shares. In late 2018, Arison announced the gradual sale of her holdings, concluding this process in September 2022 when shares worth over one billion shekels were sold, leaving the bank without a controlling shareholder.

In 2021, the bank reported a net profit of 915 million shekels ($267 million) in Q4 2020, compared to a net loss of 629 million shekels in Q4 2019. The bank's credit portfolio continued to grow, and it entered the digital wallet sector and made deals with banks in Bahrain and the UAE as a part of the Abraham Accords.

Net profit for 2023 totaled NIS 7,360 million, compared with NIS 6,532 million in 2022. The main driver of the increase is 19.3% growth in income, which was driven by rate hikes and the growth in activity, and despite a NIS 1.9 million credit loss provision booked in 2023.

== Global presence ==
The bank has operated several international subsidiaries: In the City of London and Poalim Asset Management (UK) Limited; in the United States (New York City, California, and Miami) and in Canada; BHI Private Banking, Switzerland Bank Hapoalim (Switzerland) Ltd., Zürich, Geneva, Luxembourg, South America, and the Cayman Islands. In recent years, the bank's international presence has significantly reduced, and by 2023, only the New York branch remained operational.

== 2018-2022 ==
Bank Hapoalim reached an agreement that canceled the labor dispute called by the Histadrut labour federation in December. The January 2020 deal, according to the regulatory filing by the bank in Tel Aviv, suggests to raise worker wages by an average of 3.7% from 2018 to 2022, bank employees will also get a one-time grant of 210 million shekels ($60.6 million), whereas the bank also plans to reduce its workforce by over 900 jobs through an early retirement plan.

== 2023-present ==
In 2023, Bank Hapoalim, along with other leading banks in Israel, faced criticism from the Governor of the Bank of Israel, Professor Amir Yaron, for generating significant profits while providing insufficient service to clients. The bank reported record-breaking financial performance, with net profits amounting to billions of shekels. At the same time, customers expressed dissatisfaction with low interest rates on deposits, which did not align with the rising interest rates on loans. This sparked a broad public debate over the fairness of banking policies amid the increasing cost of living in the country.

In January 2026, Bank Hapoalim announced that it had raised $2 billion through a private bond sale to international institutional investors, with demand reportedly reaching approximately $7 billion, marking one of the largest overseas bond issuances by an Israeli bank and reflecting strong investor interest in its financial performance.

== The Bank's Organizational Structure ==
Bank Hapoalim Group operates in Israel across various banking sectors and related capital market activities through four main divisions: the Corporate Division, the Retail Division, the Financial Markets and International Banking Division, and the Innovation and Strategy Division.

=== Corporate Division ===
This division serves business clients. In the large corporations sector, it operates through industry-specialized sectors, while in the Middle Market sector, it operates through business centers distributed across Israel. Additionally, the division provides customer service via dedicated service centers offering operational support and through a foreign trade system that serves all bank customers.

=== Retail Division ===
This division caters to households, private banking clients, foreign residents, and small businesses through 204 branches, investment consulting centers, and a mobile branch serving customers at approximately 37 service points (about half of which are in retirement homes). It also offers various direct channels, including self-service machines in branches and customer premises, "Hapoalim Internet," "Hapoalim Mobile," the "Hapoalim by Phone" call center, a voice system for information retrieval and transactions, and social media inquiry services.

=== Poalim Equity ===
The real investments and investment banking arm of Bank Hapoalim, invests in equity and debt in private companies across various sectors in Israel and worldwide. The company provides loans and offers integrated growth solutions for private companies.

Additionally, Poalim Equity operates an alternative investment platform, which includes investments in local and international private equity funds, the establishment of funds, and syndication investments for institutional entities. The company also provides advisory services for investment banking, supports mergers and acquisitions processes, facilitates private capital raises, and assists with public offerings of Israeli or Israel-affiliated companies on U.S. stock exchanges through a partnership with the American investment bank William Blair.

Poalim Equity holds a 20% stake in Leader Capital Markets, one of Israel's leading underwriting firms. As a subsidiary of Bank Hapoalim, Poalim Equity invests in equity and debt in private companies, grants loans, and provides integrated growth solutions to a wide range of businesses.

=== Financial Markets and International Banking Division ===
This division coordinates the bank group's activities in most capital market areas in Israel and abroad. These activities include providing securities trading services (brokerage), securities custody, currency and derivatives trading, research and consulting services, support for financial asset managers, investment portfolio management, investment banking, underwriting services, and issuance management.

=== Innovation and Strategy Division ===
This division is responsible for the development of the "Bit" payment application.

== Hapoalim Investments ==
"Hapoalim Investments" was the bank's investment house, established in 1963 under the name "Bank Hapoalim Investment Company Ltd." Over the years, "Hapoalim Investments" became one of Israel's leading companies in promoting diverse investments in fields such as industry, advanced technology, communications, advertising, computing, trade, real estate, and more. In 1996, "Ordan Industries" acquired the controlling shares in the company from Bank Hapoalim for 206 million shekels, following the recommendations of the David Brodet Committee to reduce economic concentration in Israel by limiting banks' holdings in real corporations. In 2001, the company's name was changed to Polar Investments. By 2013, "Polar Investments" entered into a debt arrangement.

== Poalim Tech ==
In 2015, Bank Hapoalim established Poalim Tech as a dedicated arm to provide tailored financial services for the technology sector. The division operates through two primary service tracks: a Growth center in Tel Aviv focusing on credit and banking for mature firms, and an Early Stage center in Herzliya Pituach for startups. Internationally, Poalim Tech provides commercial banking services to U.S. tech companies via the bank's American branch and in partnership with BHI.

== CEOs and Chairpersons of Bank Hapoalim Through the Years ==
=== CEOs of Bank Hapoalim ===
| Name | Term | Notes |
|---|---|---|
| Yosef Aharonovitz | 1923–1937 | The first manager of the bank |
| Peretz Naftali | 1938–1949 | Later served as a minister in Israeli governments |
| Yitzhak Bareli and Avraham Zivarski | 1949–1955 | Chairmen of the management |
| Avraham Zivarski | 1956–1968 | Chairman of the management |
| Dr. Asher Halperin | 1969–1972 | Co-CEO |
| Yaakov Levinson | 1968–1976 | Chairman of the management |
| Naftali Blumenthal | 1976–1978 | Served as acting chairman during Levinson's stay in the U.S.; later a Knesset member |
| Yaakov Levinson and Ephraim Reiner | 1978–1980 | Chairmen of the management |
| Yaakov Levinson and Giora Gazit | 1980 | Chairmen of the management |
| Moshe Olnick | 1979–1994 | Acting chairman and co-CEO |
| Giora Gazit | 1980–1986 | Chairman of the management |
| Amiram Sivan | 1986–2002 | Former Director General of the Ministry of Finance |
| Eli Yonas | 2002–2003 | First to be officially titled CEO |
| Zvi Ziv | 2003–2009 | |
| Zion Kenan | 2009–2016 | |
| Arik Pinto | 2016–2019 | |
| Dov Kotler | 2019–2024 | |
| Yadin Antebi | 2024 – present | |

=== Chairpersons of Bank Hapoalim (Board of Directors) ===
| Name | Term | Notes |
|---|---|---|
| Yitzhak Bareli | 1951–1955 | |
| Avraham Zivarski | 1956–1968 | |
| Yaakov Levinson | 1968–1976 | Chairman of the Board of Directors |
| Naftali Blumenthal | 1976–1978 | Acting chairman during Levinson's stay in the U.S.; later a Knesset member |
| Ephraim Reiner | 1978–1985 | Chairman of the Board of Directors |
| Eitan Berglas | 1985–1992 | Chairman of the Board; former Vice-Rector at Tel Aviv University |
| Emmanuel Sharon | 1992–1998 | First to be officially titled Chairperson of the Bank; former Director General of the Ministry of Finance and Civil Service Commissioner |
| Shlomo Nehama | 1998–2007 | |
| Dani Dankner | 2007–2009 | Resigned following pressure from the Bank of Israel |
| Yair Seroussi | 2009–2017 | |
| Oded Eran | 2017–2020 | Passed away shortly after announcing his retirement |
| Reuven Krupik | 2020 – present | |

== Controversies and criticism ==
=== Tax evasion and money laundering ===
On 30 April 2020, the bank was found to be complicit in tax evasion and money laundering relating to FIFA and bidding for the World Cup. It was ordered to pay fine of $874.3 million after pleading guilty to the first charge, which involved helping US taxpayers to stash some $7.6 billion in more than 5,500 secret Swiss and Israeli bank accounts. It was the second-largest recovery by the US Department of Justice since it began investigating the facilitation of US tax evasion by foreign banks in 2008.

It was ordered to pay $30 million in forfeitures and fines in relation to the second charge, which pertained to helping launder more than $20 million in bribes and kickbacks for officials involved in the corruption scandal that embroiled football's world governing body FIFA in 2015. Internal Revenue Service criminal investigation chief Don Fort said, "There is no excuse for a foreign financial institution to unlawfully assist wealthy Americans in flouting their responsibilities to pay their taxes. With today's guilty plea, Bank Hapoalim is taking responsibility for their role in deliberately breaking the law and undermining the integrity of this nation's tax system."

Assistant attorney general Brian Benczkowski stated that "for nearly five years, Bank Hapoalim employees used the US financial system to launder tens of millions of dollars in bribe payments to corrupt soccer officials in multiple countries", while William Sweeney, assistant director of the FBI's New York field office, said that "Bank Hapoalim admits executives looked the other way, and allowed illicit activity to continue even when employees discovered the scheme and reported it."

=== Involvement in Israeli settlements ===
In January 2014, Danske Bank and the Dutch pension fund PGGM blacklisted Bank Hapoalim for its involvement in the financing of settlements in the Palestinian territories.

In October 2017, Danish pension firm Sampension banned investment in Hapoalim alongside three other companies operating in illegal Israeli settlements in the West Bank, including Bank Leumi, Israeli telecoms firm Bezeq and German firm Heidelberg Cement.

On 12 February 2020, the United Nations published a database of 112 companies helping to further Israeli settlement activity in the West Bank, including East Jerusalem, as well as in the occupied Golan Heights. These settlements are considered illegal under international law. Bank Hapoalim was listed on the database on account of its "provision of services and utilities supporting the maintenance and existence of settlements" and "banking and financial operations helping to develop, expand or maintain settlements and their activities" in these occupied territories.

On 5 July 2021, Norway's largest pension fund KLP said it would divest from Bank Hapoalim together with 15 other business entities implicated in the UN report for their links to Israeli settlements in the occupied West Bank.

== Bank logos ==
The bank's logo during the 1990s

The bank's logo from 1998 - September 2001

The bank's logo from September 2001 - January 2018

The bank's logo since January 2018

== Issuance of the Bank's Commemorative Stamp ==
To mark its 100th anniversary, the bank, in collaboration with Israel Post and the Philatelic Service, issued the "Centennial Stamp," designed by stamp designer Miri Gistor.

== See also ==
- Economy of Israel
