= Rakefet Russak-Aminoach =

Israeli business executive (born 1966)

- רקפת רוסק עמינח
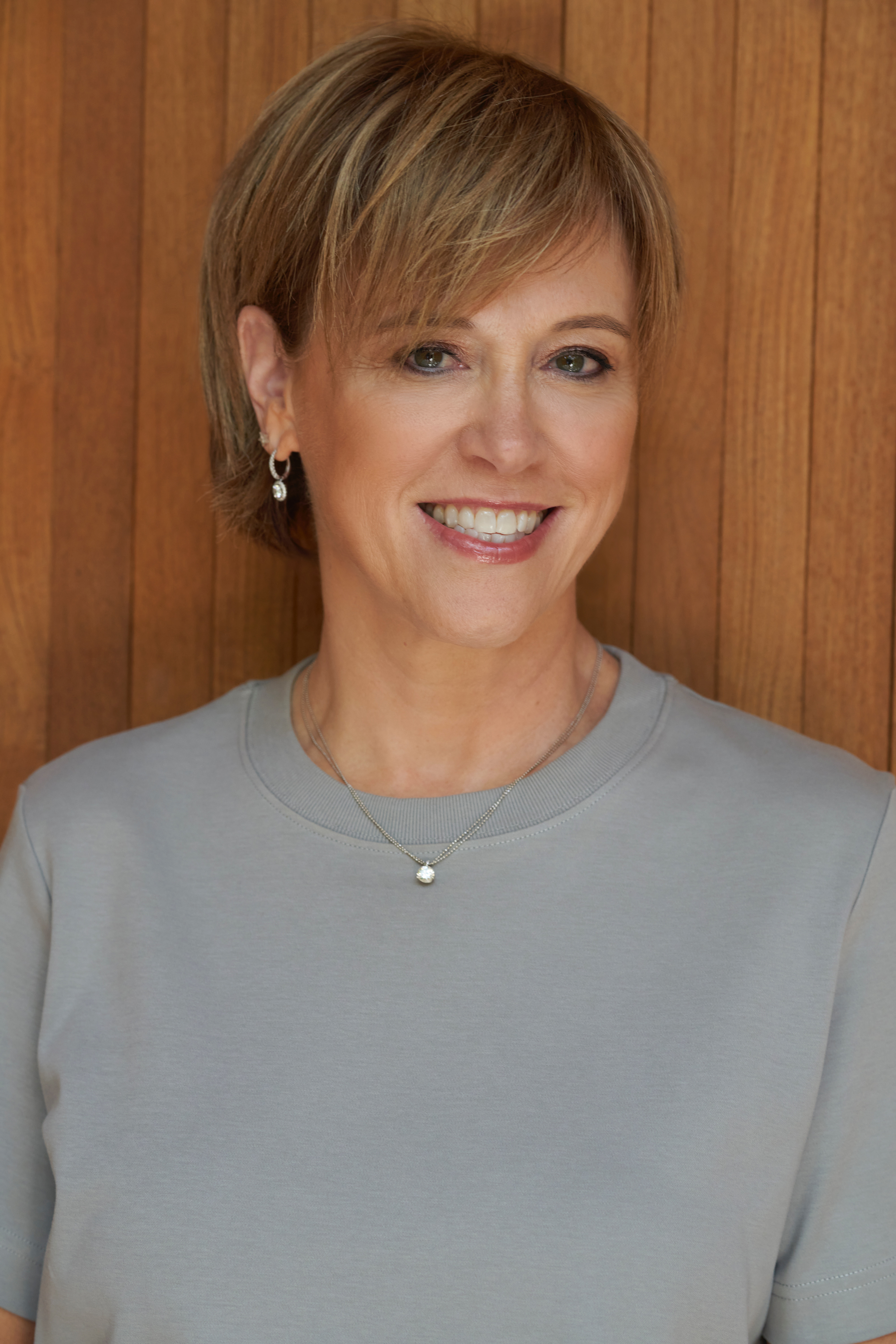
- Rakefet Russak Aminoach
- Born: February 1, 1966 (age 60); Ramat Aviv, Israel
- Education: Tel Aviv University (BA, MBA, LLB)
- Occupations: Managing Partner at Team8; Board Member of BNY Mellon; Former President and CEO of Bank Leumi

Rakefet Russak-Aminoach (Hebrew: רקפת רוסק עמינח; born February 1, 1966) is a Managing Partner at Team8, a global venture fund. Russak Aminoach served as president and CEO of Bank Leumi from May 1, 2012, to October 2019. In 2024 Rakefet joined the board of BNY.

Russak-Aminoach was named in Fortune Magazine's "100 Most Powerful Women in Business" list three times (2015, 2016, 2018), She was also named one of American Banker's 2024 Most Influential Women in Fintech. Rakefet is considered a pioneer in the digital banking field and is known for launching Pepper, Israel's first mobile-only bank.

== Early life and education ==
Russak-Aminoach was born and raised in Tel Aviv, Israel. She is the daughter of Rachel and Shmuel Russak, CPA, and the second of three daughters. After completing high school, Russak-Aminoach began her academic studies at Tel Aviv University, within the framework of Atuda, the Israeli military's Academic Reserves Program. After graduating with a B.A. (summa cum laude) in economics and accounting. she began an M.B.A. program at Tel Aviv University, specializing in Finance, while lecturing at the university's Accounting Faculty. Again, she graduated with honors and later on completed her LLB at Tel Aviv University. Russak-Aminoach served in the Israel Defense Forces as a lecturer in the IDF Command & Staff College, where she taught Operations Research and Project Management.

== Career ==
Between 1992 and 1994, Russak-Aminoach served as personal assistant to Galia Maor, then Deputy CEO of Bank Leumi. In 1995, she became a partner at Somekh-Chaikin CPA firm (KPMG Israel). Five years later, in July 2000, she was appointed CEO of the firm.

In January 2004, Russak-Aminoach was appointed head of the Corporate Division of Bank Leumi, becoming the youngest management member in the history of the Bank. On July 1, 2011, she was appointed Senior Deputy CEO of the Bank.

=== CEO of Bank Leumi ===
On May 1, 2012, Russak-Aminoach was appointed CEO of Bank Leumi. Six years after her appointment, Leumi established itself as the leading bank in Israel in terms of profits, market cap, and innovation. To reach this landmark, Russak- Aminoach led a turnaround, within the Leumi Group, focusing on digital transformation and enhancing efficiency.

These steps included an extensive streamlining program across the Group, which resulted in a reduction of about 40% in the Group's workforce, merging branches and business lines, exiting the Bank's global private banking operations, and more. All this led to a significant decrease in the Bank's total expenses. In addition, Russak-Aminoach led major steps to improve the Bank's capital adequacy. During this period, Leumi attained a credit portfolio with minimal credit loss expenses, one of the best of its kind. Russak-Aminoach's work at Leumi resulted in a Harvard Business School case study.

During Russak-Aminoach's tenure, the bank received certain alleviations throughout the US tax evasion investigation because of the complete cooperation it demonstrated, concluding the investigation already at the end of 2014. In comparison, Poalim bank paid the regulators massive amount of $500 million more than Leumi, and the total difference of $750 million (including consultants’ fee) was due to the US regulators’ realization that Poalim is buying time and does not cooperate fully with them.

In May 2014, Russak-Aminoach decided to significantly expand Leumi's high-tech banking operations with the establishment of LeumiTech, the Group's high-tech banking arm, which provides tailor-made financial services to Israeli high-tech companies operating around the globe. Based in Tel Aviv, LeumiTech also operates in London, New York and Palo Alto.

In October 2014, the Israeli social activist Barak Cohen began to coordinate the "Ba'im LaBanka'im" ("Coming to the Bankers") protest against senior officials in the banking system, including Russak-Aminoach. As part of the activity, Cohen read slogans in condemnation of Russak-Aminoach near the high school where her daughter studied and scattered posters condemning her in the school yard. The court issued a restraining order to Cohen and his teammates from Russak-Aminoach and Zion Kenan, for stalking. In May 2019, Cohen pleaded guilty in a plea bargain to invasion of privacy as part of the "Ba'im LaBanka'im" protest actions, and in November 2019 he was sentenced to six months probation and a fine of 20,000 NIS.

In early 2017, in light of the Bank's results, Bank Leumi announced a new dividend policy of 40% of profits, following a long period with no dividend payouts. Since Russak-Aminoach took office as CEO, and until the end of the third quarter of 2018, Leumi's share price has more than doubled.

In January 2018, Russak-Aminoach led a strategic investment into Bank Leumi USA, a fully owned subsidiary of the Leumi Group, with the sale of 15% of Bank Leumi USA to Endicott Capital Management and MSD Capital L.P. The agreement reflected a net worth value of approximately US$1 billion for Bank Leumi USA, 20% above its equity capital.

Six months later, Russak-Aminoach promoted an agreement with US private equity fund Warburg Pincus for the sale of Leumi Card, Leumi Group's credit card subsidiary, for NIS 2.5 billion, 30% above its equity capital. The agreement positioned Leumi as the first bank in Israel to implement the recommendations of the Government Committee for Increasing Competition in the Banking Industry ("The Strum Committee").

In July 2019, she announced that she was stepping down as CEO.

=== Digital banking ===
Russak Aminoach is considered a pioneer in the global digital banking arena. Under her leadership, Bank Leumi began executing a business strategy that focuses, among others, on digital innovation and implementation of advanced technologies across all the Bank's business lines.

In early 2016, she established Leumi's 'Digital Banking Division', which was responsible for setting up Israel's first fully digital bank, alongside spearheading the Bank's digital transformation, marketing, innovation and Big Data activities.

In February 2017, Leumi launched Pepper Pay, a P2P mobile payments app. Five months later, Leumi officially launched Pepper, a unique, fully digital bank, enabling complete current account management via mobile only.

In light of its achievements in the digital field, Bank Leumi has won several prestigious awards in recent years, including "Best Corporate Digital Bank in Israel" (Global Finance Magazine, 2016), and "Best Digital Bank in Israel" (Global Finance Magazine, 2017).

In May 2018, Leumi won the Dell Technologies "Innovator Award" for the foundation of Pepper.

In December 2018, Leumi was named "Bank of the Year in Israel" by The Banker magazine, mainly due to the Bank's ongoing commitment to digital innovation.

=== Founding Team8 Fintech ===
Rakefet Russak-Aminoach and two other partners at Team8 led the launch of Team8 Fintech, a fintech venture creation fund. Team8's fintech arm specializes in building innovative fintech companies that focus on scaling businesses to transform the financial services sector.

=== Other work ===
Russak-Aminoach served as a board member of Hailo Technologies from 2020 to 2024, and as its chairperson from 2024 to 2025.

In April 2024, Russak-Aminoach was elected to the Board of Directors of BNY.

=== Public work ===
In March 2017, Russak Aminoach began serving as a mentor with SHESHE, Meta's mentorship program for women in Israel.

In July 2023, Russak Aminoach was appointed as the Honorary Consul of Norway in Israel.

In November 2024, Russak Aminoach was appointed to the Management Committee of the Hebrew University of Jerusalem.

== Recognition ==
In September 2015, Russak-Aminoach was listed, for the first time, in Fortune magazine's list of "The World's 100 Most Powerful Women in Business". She was ranked 23rd in Europe, Middle East and Africa.

In December 2015, Russak-Aminoach was selected as one of the "Ten Most Innovative CEO's in Banking" by the US Fintech blog Bank Innovation.

In September 2016, Russak-Aminoach was listed, once again, in Fortune's "100 Most Powerful Women in Business" list. She was ranked 43rd in the international list.

In November 2016, Russak-Aminoach was included in the BBC's "100 Women 2016" list, which consists of inspirational and influential women around the globe.

In December 2016, Russak-Aminoach was selected, once again, as one of the "Ten Most Innovative CEO's in Banking" by Bank Innovation.

In October 2018, Russak-Aminoach was listed, for the third time, in Fortune's "100 Most Powerful Women in Business" list, ranking 43rd in the international list.

In May 2019, Russak-Aminoach was listed in Financial News' "50 Most Influential Women in Middle East Finance 2019" list.

In 2024, Russak-Aminoach was included in American Banker's “Most Influential Women in Fintech“ list.

Rakefet Russak-Aminoach has appeared as a guest speaker at several prestigious international conferences, including Financial Times Innovate(November 2016, London), where she delivered an opening keynote; Money20/20 (October 2017, Las Vegas), where she spoke on the future of banking and her decision to launch the digital bank Pepper; and DLD Munich (January 2019, Munich), where she explained the difference between applying a "Digital Skin" strategy as opposed to providing a real digital experience – building it from the core, and Money20/20 Europe (June 2022, Amsterdam), where she spoke about female entrepreneurship and gender diversity in fintech leadership roles.

== Personal details ==
Rakefet Russak-Aminoach is married to Reem Aminoach, a businessman, former member of the IDF General Staff Forum, head of the Budget Department at the Israeli Ministry of Defence, chief financial advisor to the Chief of Staff of the IDF and head of the IDF's Budgetary Array. They have two daughters and reside in Ramat HaSharon, Israel.
