= Berglas =

Berglas is a surname, likely of Jewish origin. Notable people with the surname include:

- David Berglas (1926–2023), German-born British magician and mentalist
- Eitan Berglas (1934–1992), Israeli economist and banker
