= Noam Hanegbi =

Israeli technology expert and senior executive in the banking and financial sector

- נעם הנגבי
- Born: 1959 (age 66–67); Israel
- Citizenship: Israeli
- Education: Bar-Ilan University (BA Economics & Computer Science)
- Occupations: Technology executive, banker
- Years active: 2000–present
- Employer: Bank Hapoalim
- Known for: Chairmanship of Bank Hapoalim
- Title: Chairman of the Board
- Term: 17 February 2025 – present
- Board member of: Bank Hapoalim (Chair); Mercantile Discount Bank; Discount Mortgage Bank; Isracard; Diners Club Israel; Shva (Automated Bank Services Ltd.); Masav (Bank Clearing Center)
- Spouse: Married
- Children: 2 daughters

Noam Hanegbi (Hebrew: נעם הנגבי; born 1959) is an Israeli technology expert and senior executive in the banking and financial sector. He has served on the boards of directors of several Israeli financial institutions and has served as Chairman of the Board of Directors at Bank Hapoalim since February 2025.

== Early life and education ==
Hanegbi holds a bachelor's degree in Economics and Computer Science from Bar-Ilan University. He served in the Israel Defense Forces (IDF) in the MAMRAM unit, where he gained practical experience in information systems and communication technologies.

== Career ==
Between 2000 and 2011, Hanegbi served as Senior Vice President at Discount Bank, where he headed the Operations and Information Division, the Retail Banking Division, and the Marketing Division. During this period, he led the “Ofek” project, aimed at rebuilding the bank’s core IT systems.

From 2015 to 2019, he headed the Information Systems and IT Division at Maccabi Healthcare Services, where he was responsible for developing technological infrastructure for digital services to members.

Throughout his career, Hanegbi held board and chairperson roles in various financial and technology-related companies, including Mercantile Discount Bank, Discount Mortgage Bank, Isracard, Diners Club Israel, Shva (Automated Bank Services Ltd.), and Masav (Bank Clearing Center). He was also involved in national technological projects such as Israel’s border control system and the "Yevka" banking technology supervision initiative.

In 2019, he was appointed an external director at Bank Hapoalim, where he served as Chair of the Information Technology and Innovation Committee and as a member of the Credit, Audit, Corporate Governance, and Stakeholder Committees. In January 2025, Hanegbi was elected Chairman of the bank’s Board of Directors, officially assuming the position on February 17, 2025.

== Personal life ==
Hanegbi is married and has two daughters.
