= Rothschild Boulevard =

Street in Tel Aviv, Israel

Coordinates: 32°3′55.87″N 34°46′37.3″E

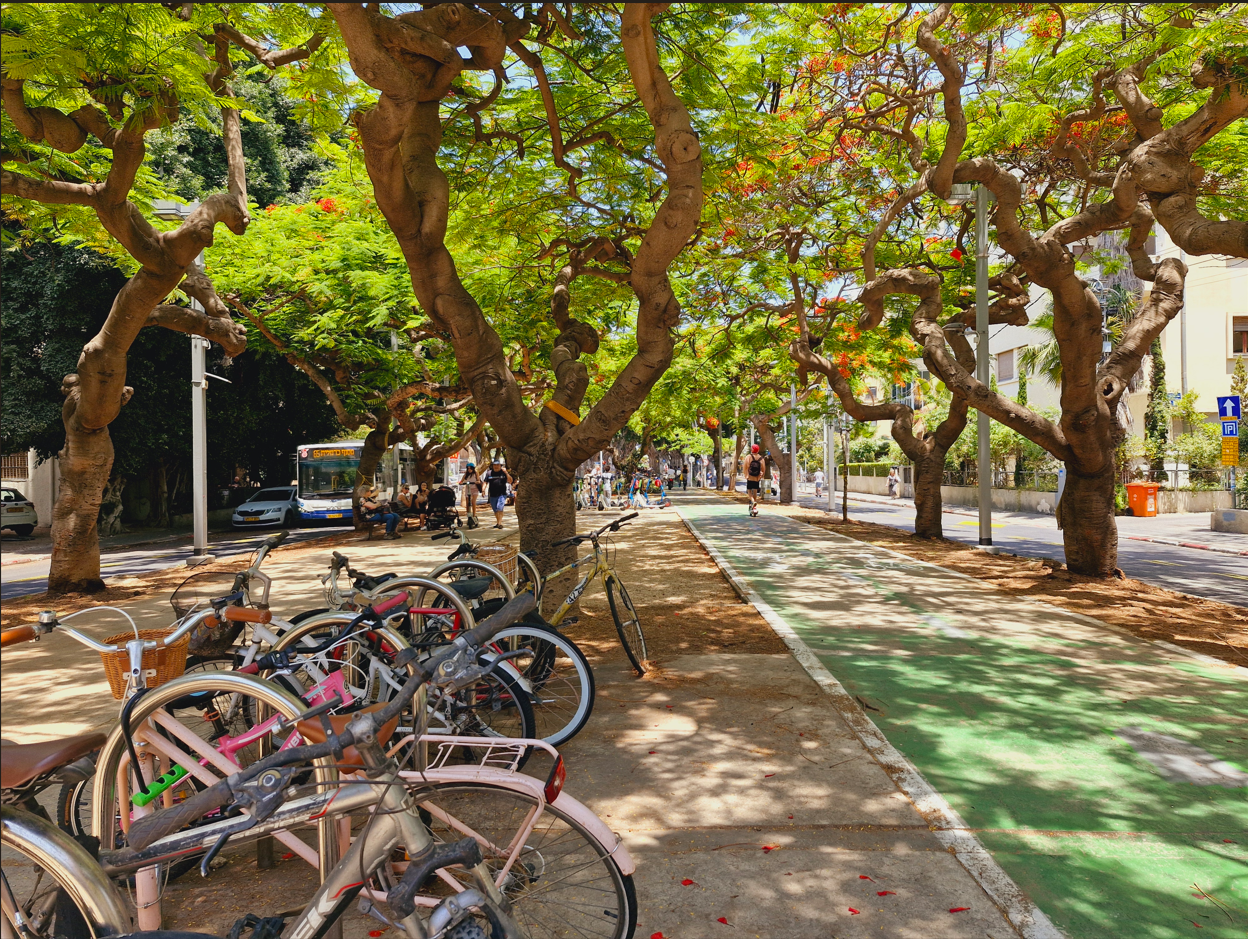
Bicycles parked next to a green cycling lane on Rothschild boulevard in Tel Aviv

Rothschild Boulevard (Hebrew: שְׂדֵרוֹת רוֹטְשִׁילְד, Sderot Rotshild) is one of the principal streets in the center of Tel Aviv, Israel, beginning in Neve Tzedek at its southeastern edge and running north to Habima Theatre. It is one of the most expensive streets in the city, being among one of its main tourist attractions. It features a wide, central strip lined with Ficus trees, as well as pedestrian and bike lanes.

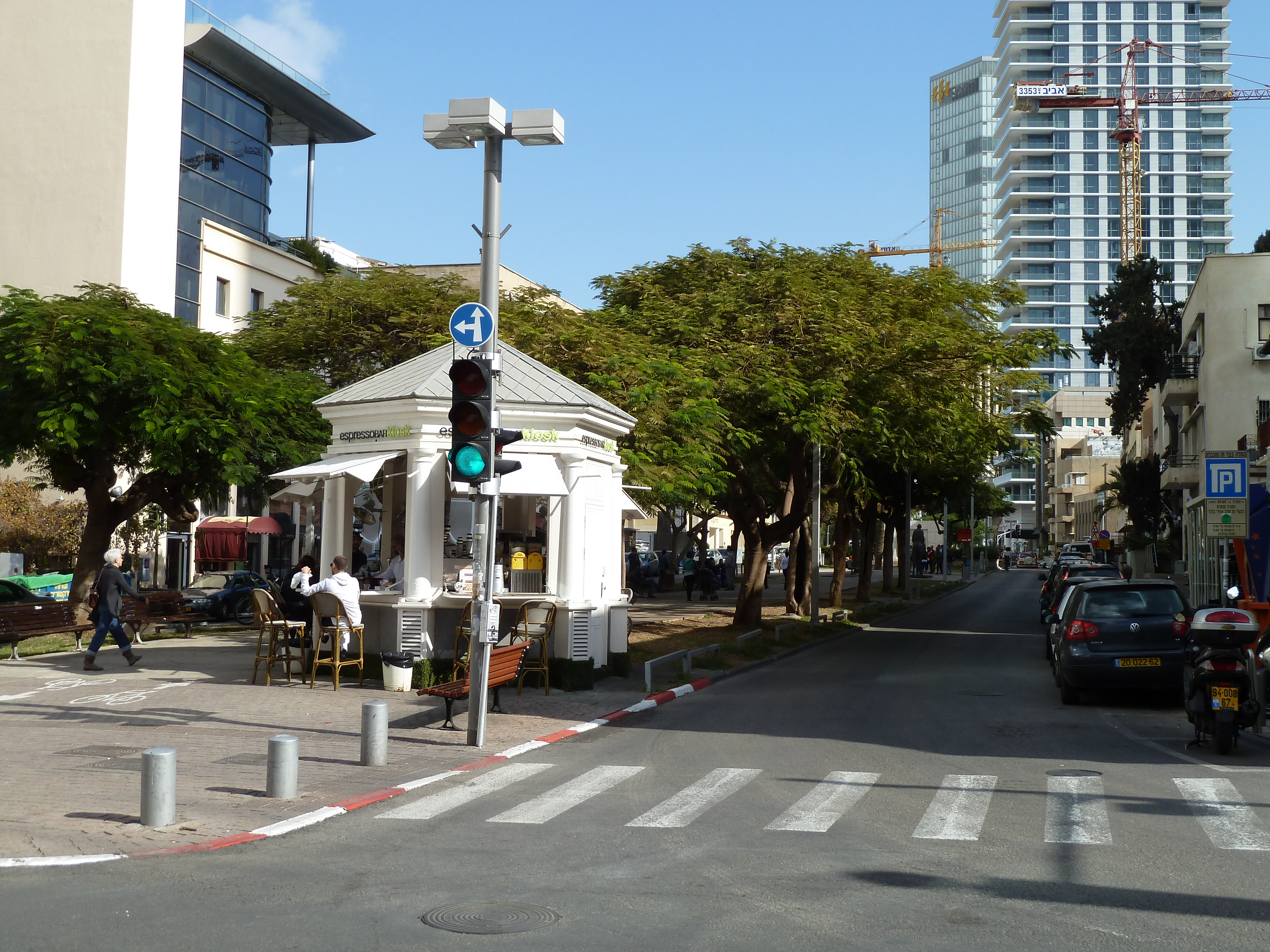
Corner of Rothschild Boulevard and Herzl Street

== History ==
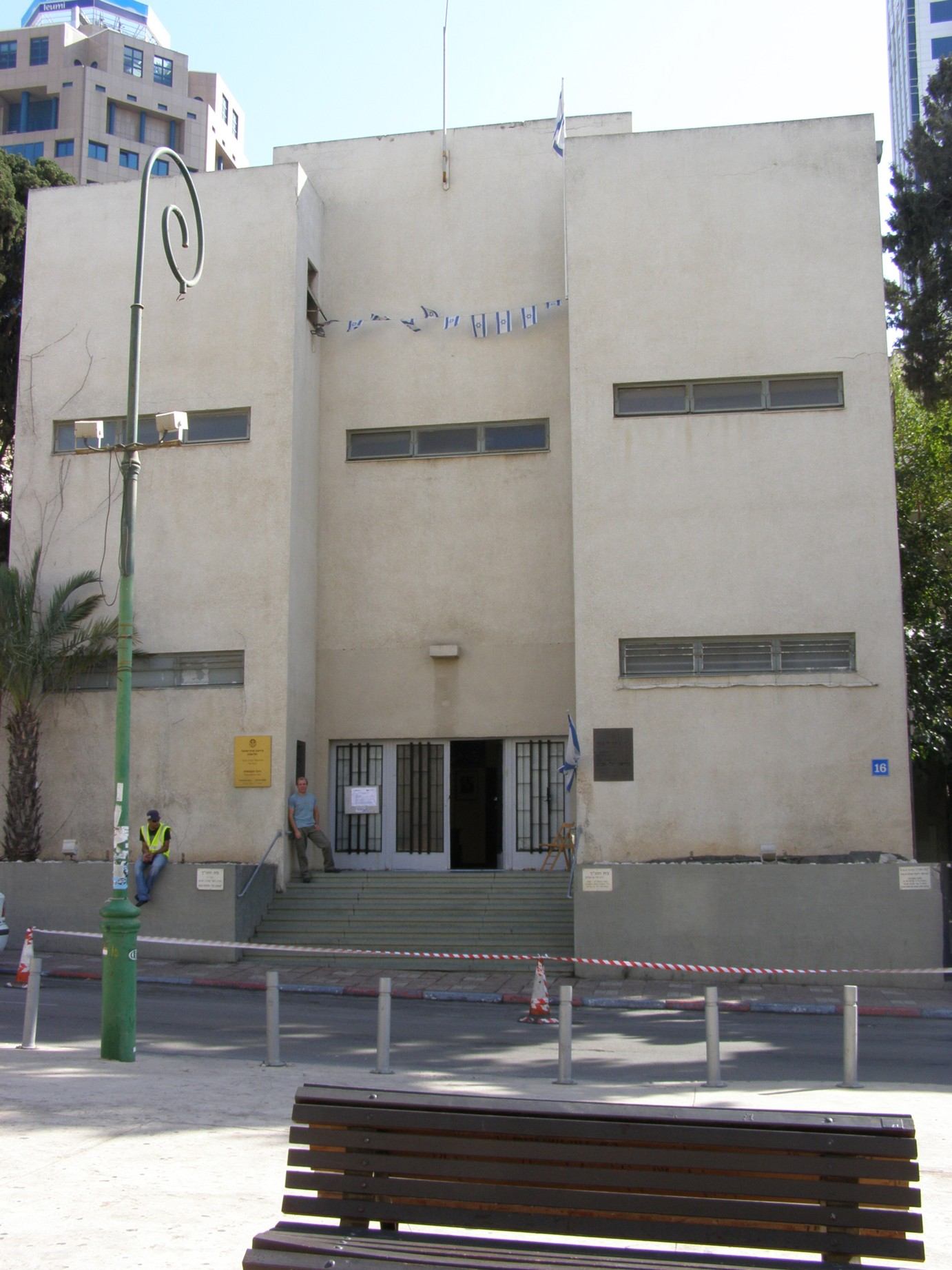
Israel's Independence Hall on 16 Rothschild Boulevard, 2007.

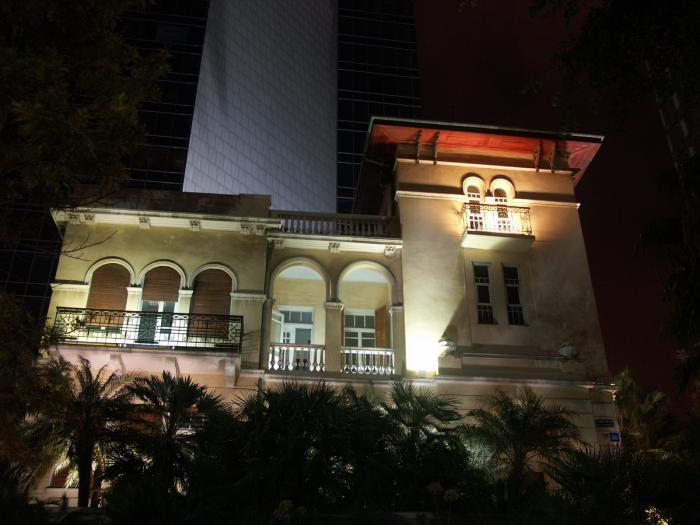
The Russian Embassy house on Rothschild Boulevard. Built (1924); restored and renovated (1991).

Rothschild Boulevard is one of the oldest streets in Tel Aviv; soon after its creation, residents requested it to be renamed in honor of Baron Edmond James de Rothschild, a strong supporter of Jewish settlement in Palestine. One house, on the corner of Rothschild Boulevard and Herzl Street, was built in 1909, by the Eliavson family, one of Tel Aviv's sixty founding families. In 2007, the building was purchased and restored by the French Institute.

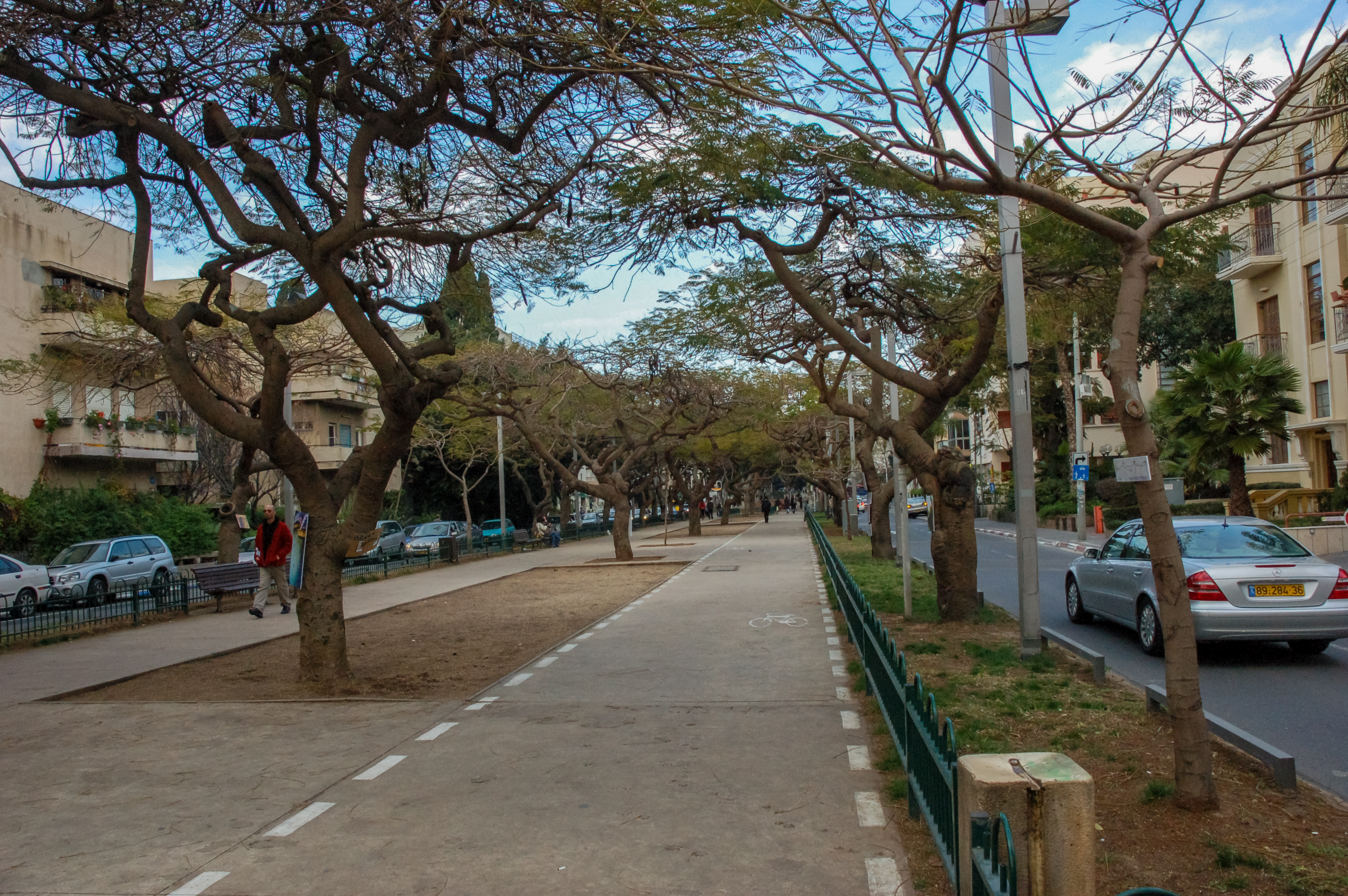
Bike lane on Rothschild Boulevard

Israel's Declaration of Independence was signed at Independence Hall on Rothschild Boulevard. The building use to be the home of Meir Dizengoff, the first mayor of Tel Aviv. It also housed the Tel Aviv museum of art before the museum moved to Helene Rubenstein hall in HaBima. Many of the historic buildings are built in the Bauhaus or International style, forming part of the White City of Tel Aviv, a UNESCO-designated World Heritage Site.

The 1925, Lederberg house at the intersection with Allenby Street features a series of large ceramic murals designed by Ze'ev Raban, a member of the Bezalel school. The four murals show a Jewish pioneer sowing and harvesting, a shepherd, and Jerusalem, with a verse from Jeremiah 31:4, "Again I will rebuild thee and thou shalt be rebuilt."

In 1995, the municipality held an architectural competition to design avenues. The architect, Moti Bodek suggested using existing avenue rings as a backbone system, which consists of pedestrian ways and bicycle paths; target the urban activities of leisure sports and recreation; along with restoration and rehabilitation of historic kiosks. The Boulevard is an arts district, with galleries including Alon Segev Gallery, Rothschild49 Art Gallery and Sommer Contemporary Art.

In 2013, Absolut Vodka introduced a specially designed bottle dedicated to Tel Aviv as part of its international cities series. The design, commemorating Tel Aviv's ficus tree boulevards, was inspired by the night landscape of Rothschild, Nordau and Chen boulevards.

== Financial center ==
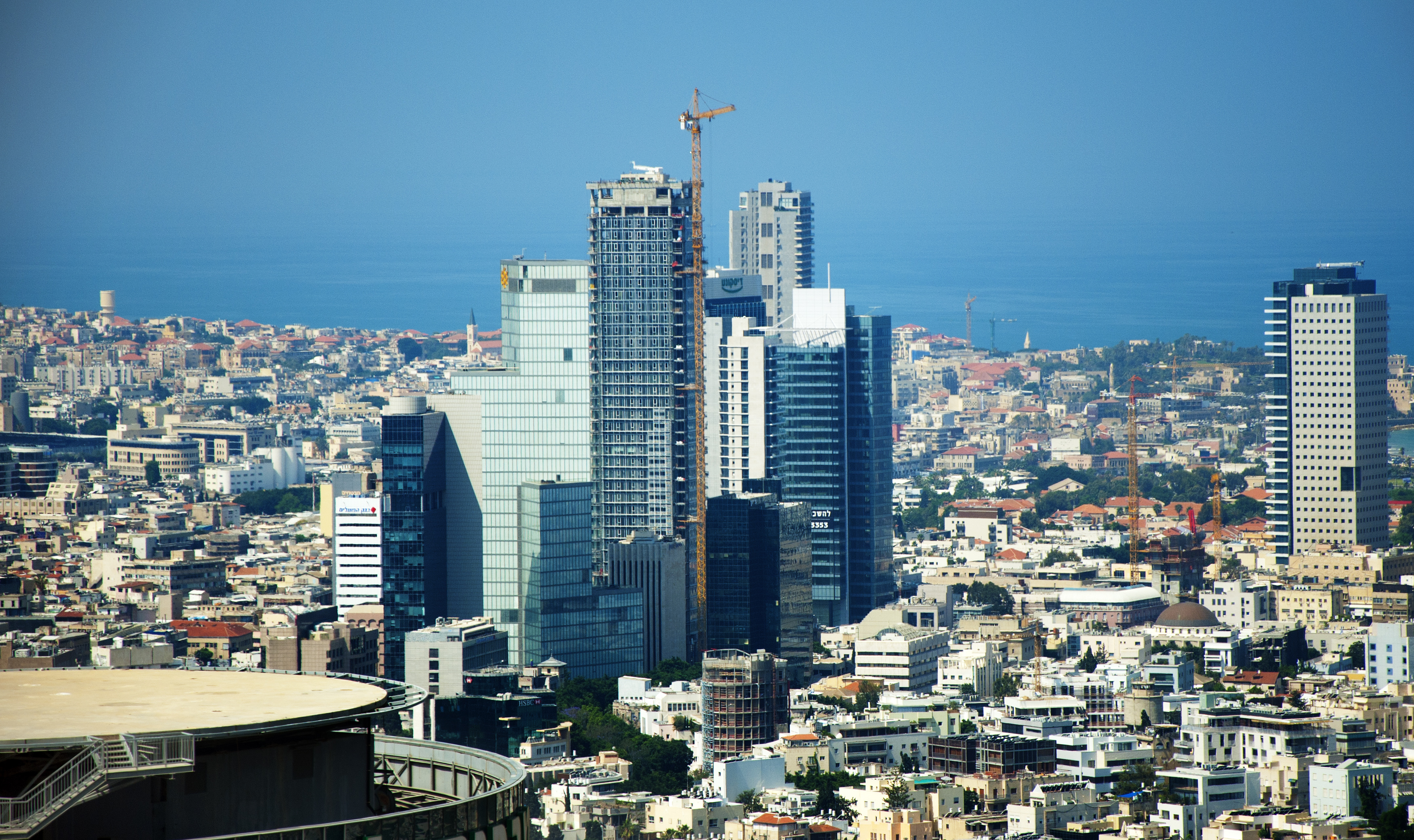
Towers on Rothschild Boulevard

Rothschild Boulevard is at the heart of Tel Aviv's financial district. It is where the First International Bank Tower is located, as well as the Israel offices of HSBC Bank. From the 1960s through the 1980s, the boulevard suffered from urban decay. By 2005, it had undergone a dramatic transformation as historic buildings were restored and residents began flowing back in and injecting the street with a renewed cultural energy. In February 2012, Bloomberg L.P. opened an office on the boulevard, followed by Julius Baer Group in March of the same year. Rothschild Boulevard was the epicenter of the 2011 Israeli social justice protests.

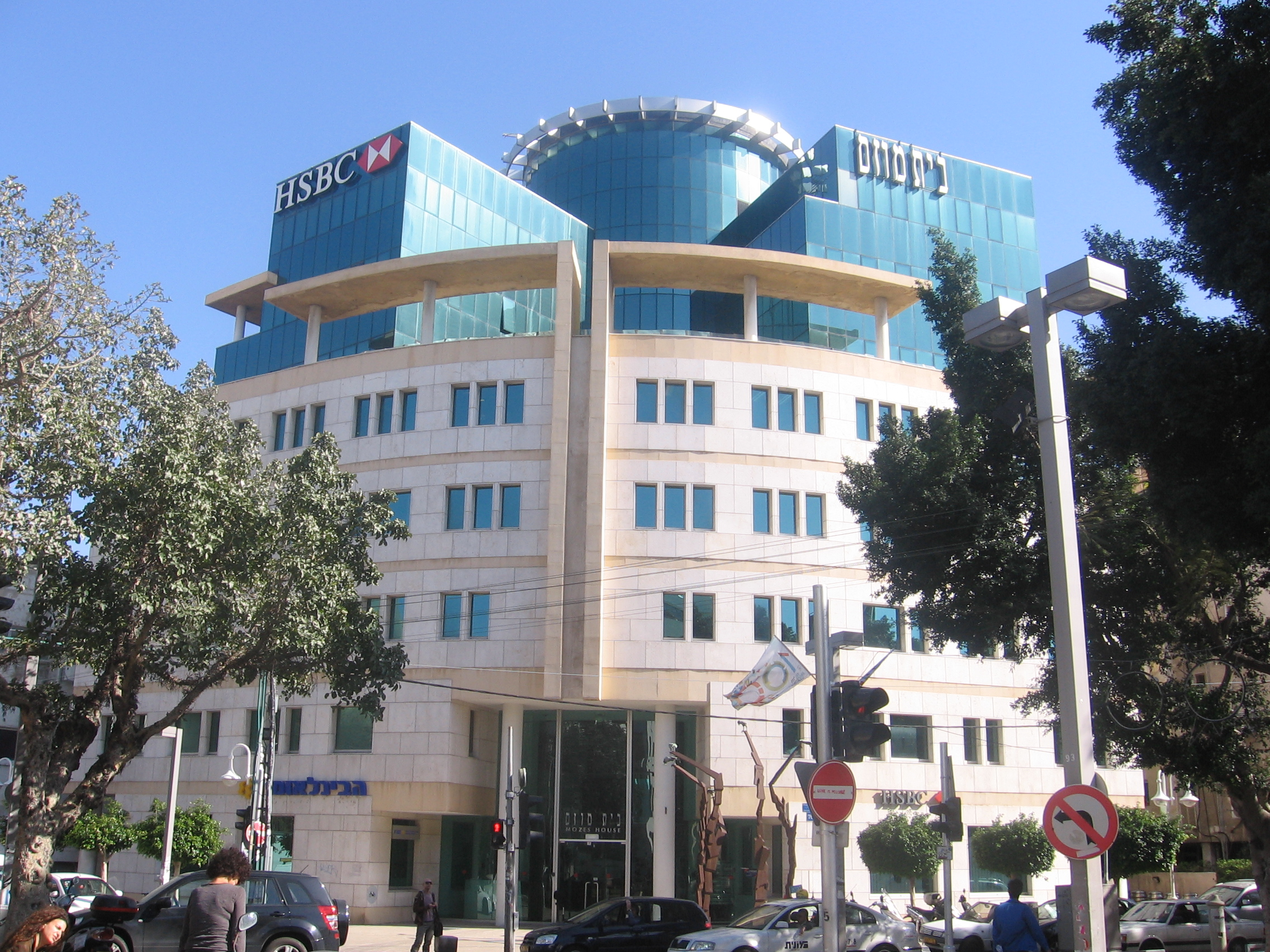
Beit Moses, Rothschild Boulevard

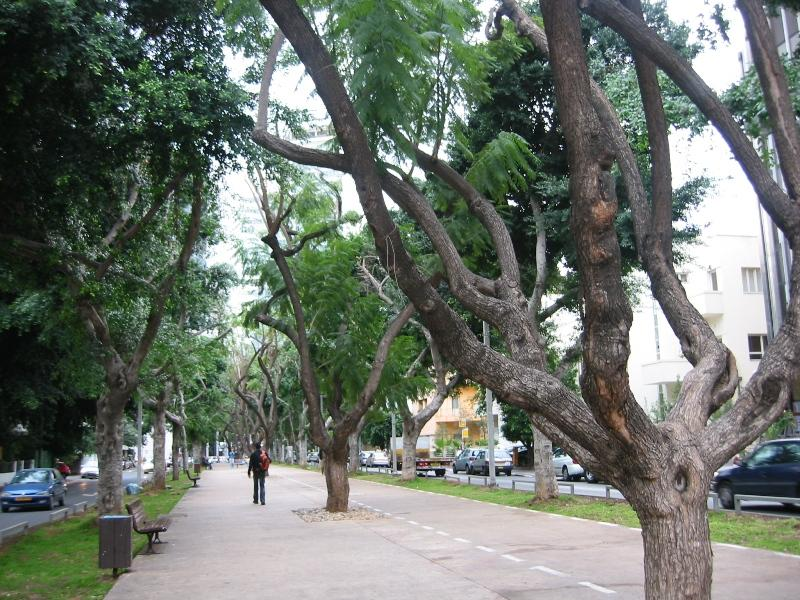
Tree-lined boulevard

== See also ==
- Rothschild 22
