= Rothschild 22 Tower =

- מגדל רוטשילד 22
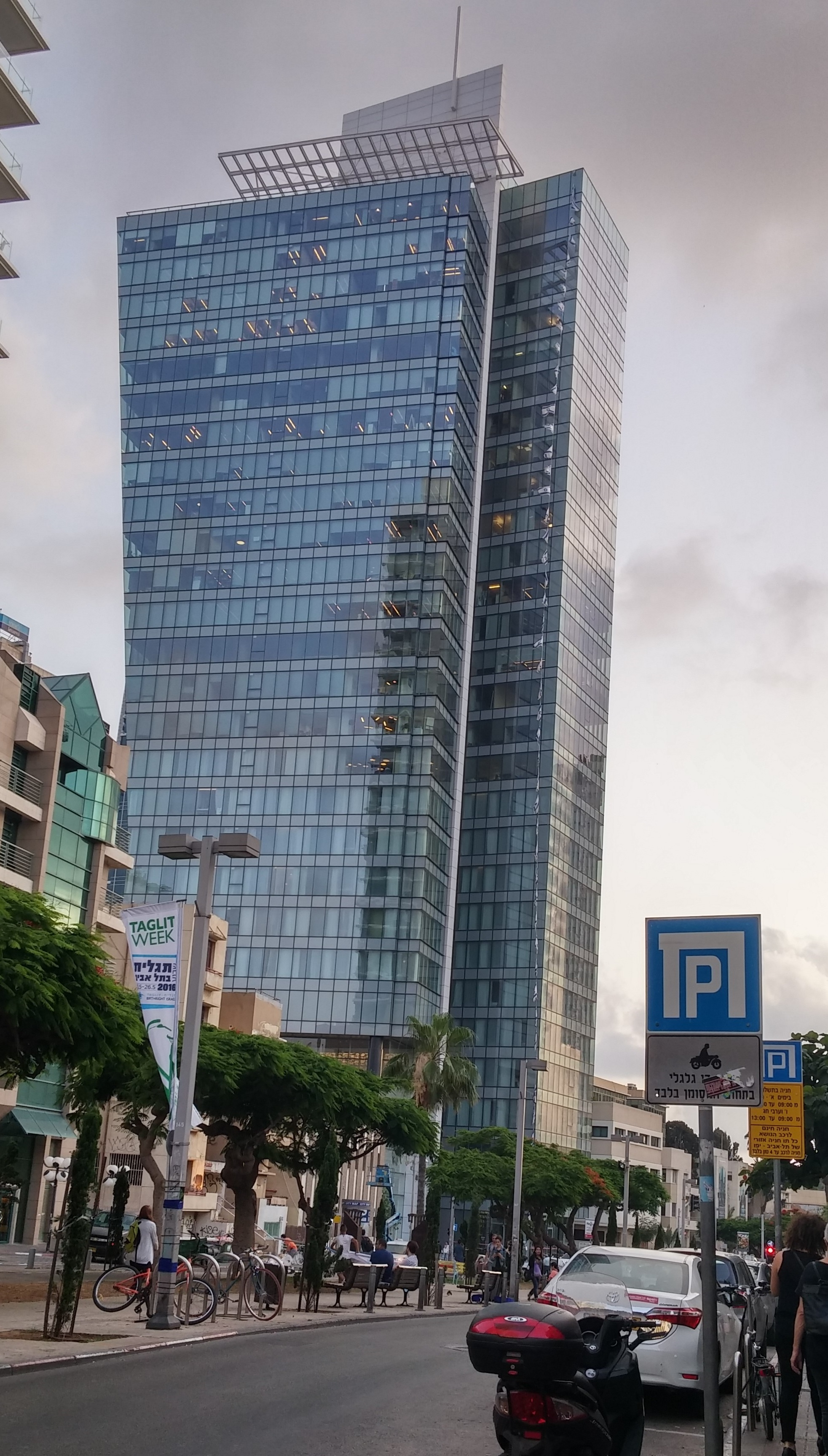
- Interactive map of the Rothschild 22 Tower area

General information
- Type: Skyscraper
- Location: Rothschild Boulevard 22, Tel Aviv, Israel
- Coordinates: 32.063°N 34.771694444444°E
- Construction started: 2010
- Construction stopped: 2014
- Cost: 450 million ILS
- Owner: LR GROUP and Aviv Group

Height
- Height: 126.9 meters

Technical details
- Floor count: 29

Design and construction
- Architect: Moshe Tzur

Website
- avivgroup.com/commercial/22

Rothschild 22 Tower (Hebrew: מגדל רוטשילד 22) is a 29-story Israeli skyscraper reaching 117.9 meters in height, with an additional 9-meter tall decorative mast, and which covers an area of 1.9 dunam.

The tower, serving as office space and as a hotel, is located at 22 Rothschild Boulevard, Tel Aviv, on the corner of Nachalat Binyamin street. Built from 2010 to 2014, the tower was constructed on the plot which previously was the location of the Beit ZIM building, which was destroyed in a fire in the year 1966.

== Before the construction of Rothschild 22 Tower ==
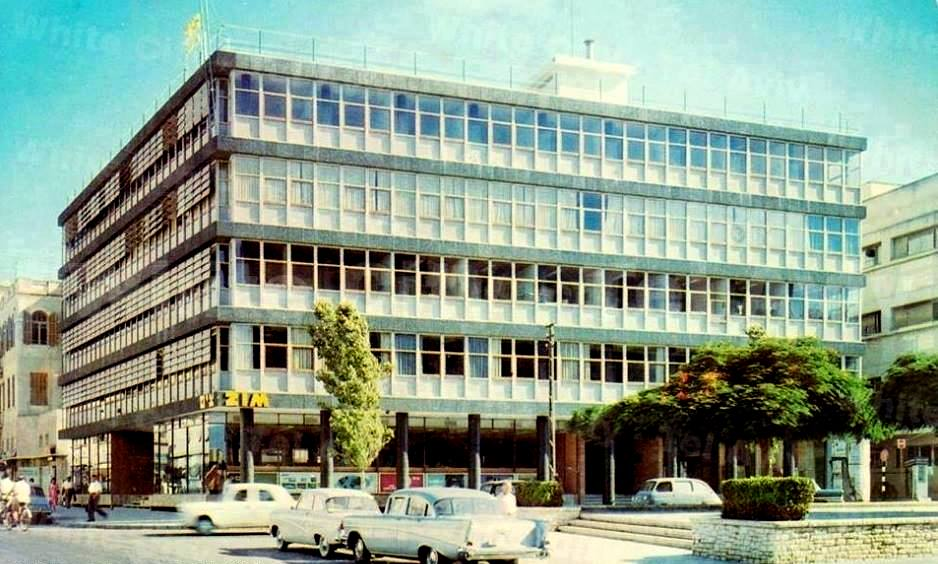
Beit ZIM in the early 1960s

In 1958, Zim Integrated Shipping Services (ZIM) constructed Beit ZIM, a five-story office building designed by the architect Dov Karmi. The building contained offices for ZIM, Dizengoff Trading, Dizengoff West Africa, Yachin Hakal Israel, Gmul, Alda, Astraco, Scandinavian Airlines, and other companies. In February 1966 the building was severely damaged in a large conflagration, which led to the decision to completely destroy the building due to safety considerations. The plot of land, now empty, was nicknamed "The ZIM pit" (Hebrew: הבור של צים).

In 1981, Bank Mizrahi acquired the plot from ZIM in order to build its central headquarters. The bank planned to lay the building's cornerstone in April 1986; however a week before the expected date the Bejski Commission published its conclusions regarding the 1983 Israel bank stock crisis including a call for the bank's CEO to resign. Following this development the bank decided to indefinitely postpone the construction.

In August 1997 the bank planned to construct a 18-story tower on the plot to serve as its offices. In order to do so, the Tel Aviv-Yafo Municipality required the bank to buy an old house for the purpose of historic preservation as a condition in order to receive a zoning permit. In that month, the bank bought the historic building Beit Naparsteg from the businessman Zadik Bino for approximately 4.5 million USD, after which it received a building permit. The bank only begun the building process in 2001, and after digging the foundations the bank's management changed its mind and decided to instead move its offices to the Moshe Aviv Tower in Ramat Gan; following this building was halted.

== Construction and population of the tower ==
In October 2006, Bank Mizrahi sold the plot to the Russian-French-Israeli businessman Arcadi Gaydamak together with four other buildings intended for preservation in the area, in exchange for 26 million USD. In June 2008 Gaydamak sold the plot and the buildings to Aviv Group & Co. in exchange for 135 million ILS. In August 2008 the Aviv Group sold the historic Beit Naparsteg building on Rothschild Boulevard 48 to the Jewish-Canadian billionaire Gerry Schwartz for 28 ILS.

In May 2009 the Tel Aviv city council approved the Aviv Group's request to build 8 additional floors in the tower which had already been approved to be built to the height of 21 stories. In June 2010 the building of Rothschild 22 Tower commenced, on the area which had until then served as a temporary parking lot. In May 2013 the "LR" Group led by Roy Ben Yami and Ami Lustig joined as a partner in the project of building the Rothschild 22 Tower, and in 2014 its construction was completed and its floors were rented out.

In April 2014, the hotel chain Fattal rented floors 2 through 10 of the tower (9 floors total) and founded "Hotel Rothschild 22", which contains about 155 rooms. The first floor hosts the restaurant Galeria 22 which serves as a cafeteria for the hotel's guests in the morning, and later in the day serves as a branch of the chain Aroma.

The 11-th floor was rented by the accounting firm kartax, and the 12-th floor was rented by the Regus company. In July 2014, Autodesk Israel rented floors 14 through 17 (4 floors total), in February 2015 ClicksMob rented the 18-th floor the 19-th floor of the tower was rented by Israel Discount Capital Markets and Investments Inc., and the 20th floor was rented by Ram Dekel Law Offices. In September 2014, Facebook Israel rented the 21 through 24th floors (4 floors total), and in December 2014 it moved its offices into the tower. In April 2015 the venture capital firm Magma Ventures rented the 25th floor of the tower; Magma Ventures had previously invested in Onavo Mobile (affiliated with Facebook Israel). In May 2015 the organization "Startup Nation Central" rented the 13th, 26th, and 27th floors of the tower.

The tower contains six elevators of which two are transparent. It contains seven underground parking levels. The lobby on the building's ground floor is officially a public space for the use of the public, and this is in fact the only air conditioned and roofed public square in Israel.

== "The Rothschild 22 Lobby Liberation Front" ==
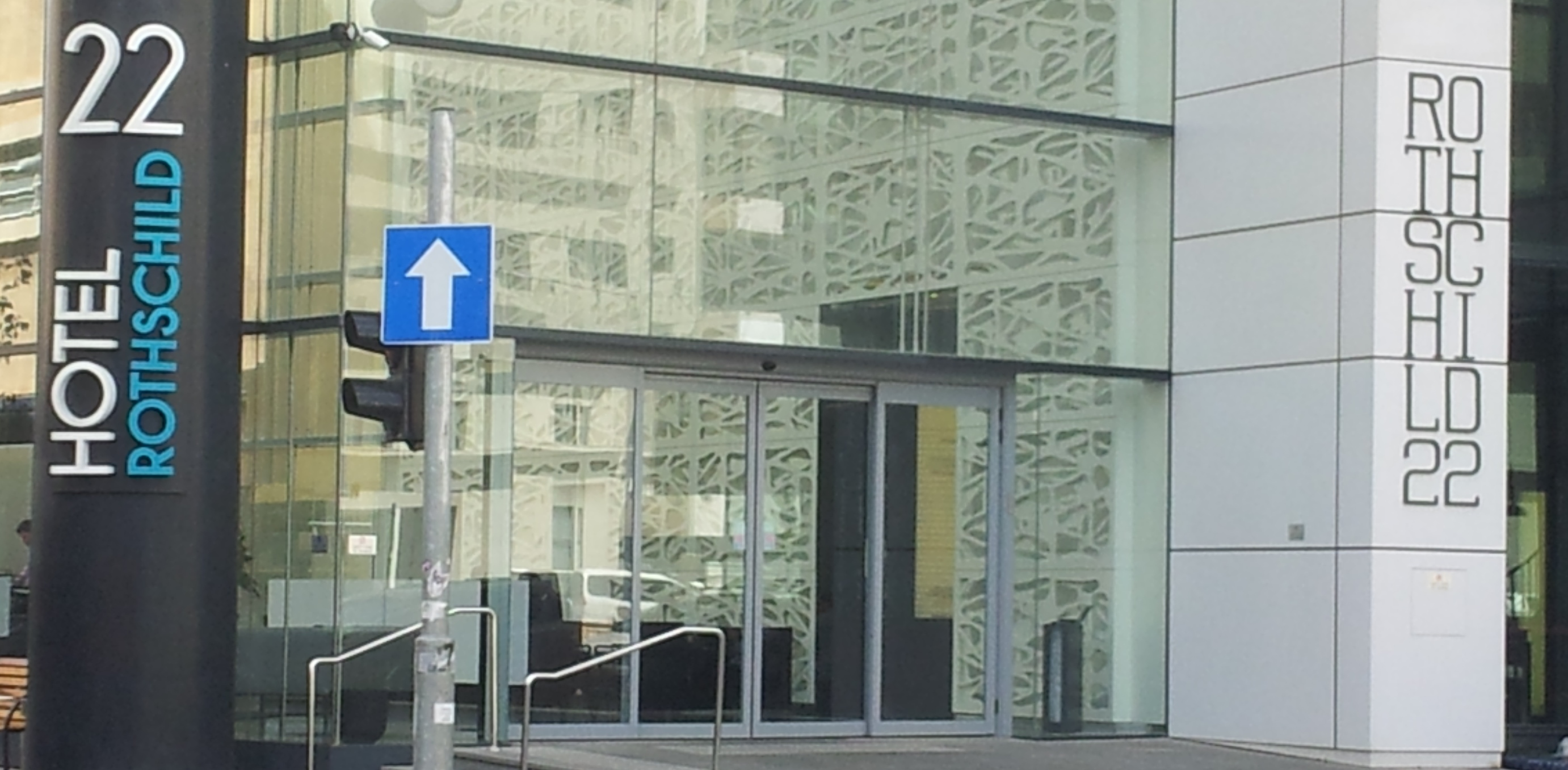
Entrance to the Rothschild 22 lobby

In August 2017 it was first reported on TheMarker that the lobby of Rothschild 22 Tower is an open public space, which was hidden from the public.

As a sign of protest against the alleged censorship perpetrated by Facebook Israel, one of the primary resident companies in the tower, the protest movement "The Rothschild 22 Lobby Liberation Front" (Hebrew: החזית לשחרור לובי רוטשילד 22) coalesced. This movement included members such as the administrators of the Mizbala blog which was blocked from Facebook and the activists of the Ba'im LaBankaim protest whose Facebook page was removed, and social activists such as Dori Ben Israel and Barak Cohen.

Since August 2017 the movement began public and media activities in the lobby of the tower which it believed must be "liberated". Video clips recorded in the lobby were viewed hundreds of thousands of times and were livestreamed on Facebook.

As an act of protest against the blocking of the Mizbala page on Facebook, in August 2017 Dori Ben Israel moved the offices of the Mizbala blog to the lobby in the tower.

Despite efforts to prevent it, in September 2017 the movement held a public screening of the movie "Facebookistan" in the tower's lobby. Over 150 attendees came to the event, including many police officers.

In October 2017 the Members of Knesset Ayman Odeh and Dov Khenin were photographed in the tower's lobby, and they called upon the public to come.

In December 2017, Dov Ben Israel and Barak Cohen were chosen among the People of the Year by Time Out Tel Aviv magazine, partially because of their activities in the movement of the Rothschild 22 lobby.
