= Yadin Antebi =

Israeli banker

- ידין ענתבי
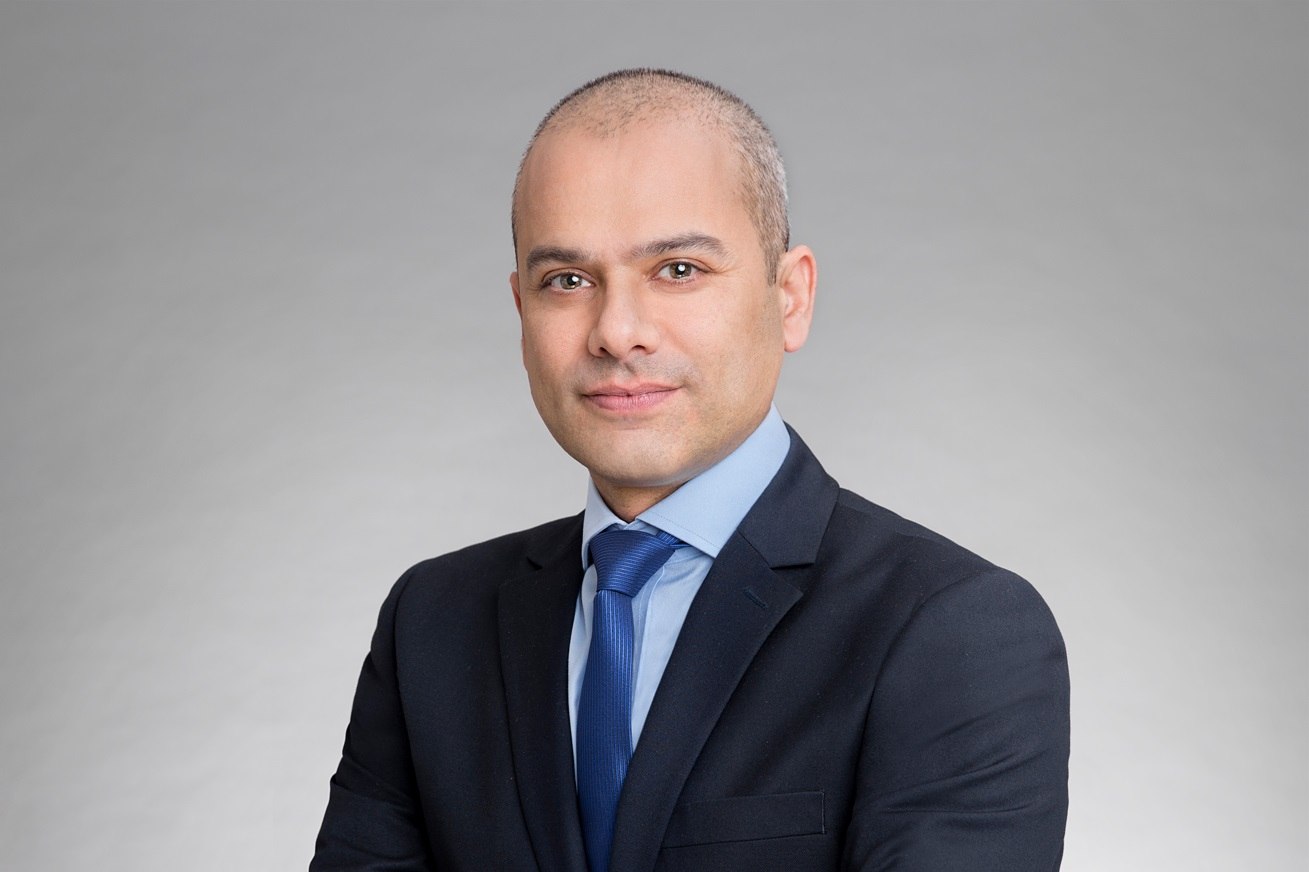
- Antebi in 2024
- Born: October 31, 1970 (age 55); Israel
- Education: Hebrew University of Jerusalem (BA in Economics and Accounting, MBA in Finance and Banking)
- Occupation: Banker
- Years active: 1998–present
- Known for: CEO of Bank Hapoalim

Yadin Antebi (born 31 October 1970) is an Israeli banker who is the CEO of Bank Hapoalim.

== Early life and education ==
Antebi was born in 1970. He holds a bachelor's degree in Economics and Accounting and a master's degree in Business Administration with a specialization in Finance and Banking, both from the Hebrew University of Jerusalem, and he is a certified public accountant.

== Career ==
After a period working as an accountant in the private sector, in 1998 he joined the Capital Market, Insurance and Savings Authority at the Israeli Ministry of Finance and was appointed deputy and assistant to the Israeli Commissioner of Insurance.

In September 2005, he was appointed Commissioner of Insurance and Acting Supervisor of the Capital Market, a position he held for four and a half years. During his tenure, he was involved in implementing the Bachar Reform to reduce concentration in the Israeli banking system within the capital market, and in addressing the effects of the subprime mortgage crisis on Israel's capital market.

In 2008, in his role as Commissioner of Capital Markets, Insurance and Savings at the Israeli Ministry of Finance, Yadin Antebi led the implementation of mandatory pension savings. Following the agreement signed between the Histadrut and employers’ organizations, Antebi formulated the regulations and guidelines that for the first time required every employer in Israel to contribute to a pension plan for their employees, even if they had not previously had an active pension fund. The contributions were introduced gradually beginning in January 2008 and reached the full contribution rate in the following years, thereby transforming pension savings from a partial right of organized workers into a universal obligation across the economy.

Between 2011–2012, he served as CEO of Dash Investment House, and resigned following the merger of the investment house with Meitav Investment House.

In 2013, he joined Bank Hapoalim and was appointed Head of the Financial Division (Chief Financial Officer). In 2018, he was appointed Head of the Financial Markets and International Banking Division.

In 2019, he ran for the position of CEO of the bank but was not selected. Five years later, in June 2024, the bank's board of directors decided to appoint him as CEO, and he assumed the position on 15 August 2024.

In 2025, he led a move in which Bank Hapoalim distributed free shares or a cash grant to its customers as part of the Bank of Israel’s relief framework. The initiative was designed to return money to the public, expose hundreds of thousands of customers to the capital market, and promote financial education through an innovative and proactive approach.
