= Hailo Technologies =

Israeli AI technology company

Hailo Technologies Ltd.
- Industry: Artificial intelligence
- Founded: 2017; 9 years ago
- Founders: Orr Danon; Avi Baum; Hadar Zeitlin; Rami Feig
- Headquarters: 82 Yigal Alon St. Tel-Aviv, Israel
- Website: hailo.ai

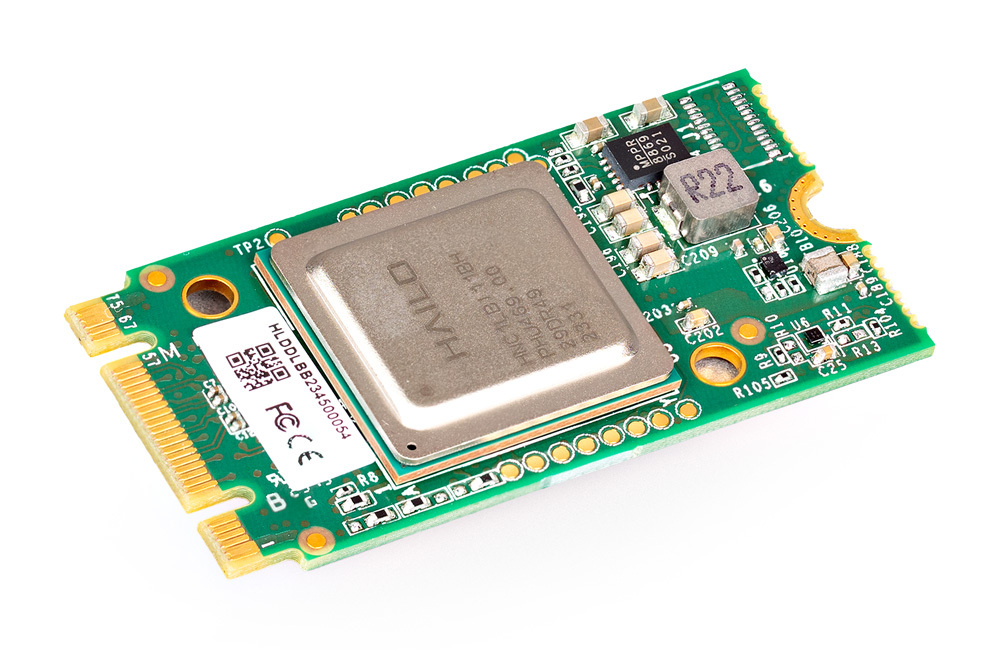
A M.2-format Hailo 8L AI accelerator

Hailo Technologies Ltd. is an Israeli technology company specializing in designing and manufacturing AI processors and AI accelerator used in autonomous vehicles, security cameras, autonomous mobile robots, and the like. Headquartered in Tel Aviv and with seven international offices, it operates in North America, Europe, and Asia.

Microchip Technology announced the acquisition of Hailo on July 24, 2026. The acquisition was completed on September 21, 2026.

== History ==
Hailo was founded in Tel Aviv in February 2017 by Orr Danon, Avi Baum, Hadar Zeitlin, and Rami Feig. Following the death of Rami Feig Orr Danon became the new CEO and Avi Baum became CTO.

The company's funding began in June 2017 with a seed round of $3.5 million. This was followed by Series A funding on June 5, 2018 (with additional funding on January 22, 2019), totaling $12.5 million and $8.5 million respectively.

Hailo unveiled its Hailo-8 AI accelerator on May 14, 2019.

Hailo secured Series B funding of $60 million on March 5, 2020, and a Series C funding of $136 million on October 12, 2021, led by Poalim Equity and Gil Agmon, with the participation of existing investors Zohar Zisapel (Hailo Former Chairman), Swiss-based ABB Technology Ventures (ATV), London's Latitude Ventures, and Israel's OurCrowd. The financing was done at a valuation of $1 billion, making Hailo a unicorn.

Also in 2021, Mooly Eden, former Senior VP at Intel, joined Hailo's board of directors, and Eyal Waldman, co-founder and former CEO of Mellanox Technologies, joined its advisory board.

Hailo's Hailo-8 AI Processor was chosen as 2021 Edge AI and Vision Product of the Year in the Edge AI Processors category.

In 2024, Hailo-15 AI Vision Processor was recognized as a Picks Award Winner at CES 2024. In April, Hailo expanded its series C fundraising round with an additional investment of $120 million and launched Hailo-10, a Generative AI acceleration module for edge devices.

In May 2024, Hailo announced the appointment of Rakefet Russak-Aminoach as chairperson, and in June of that year Yaron Garmazi was appointed as CFO and COO.

Microchip Technology completed the acquisition of Hailo on September 21, 2026.

== Products ==
=== AI Vision Processors ===
The company's Hailo-15 vision processors were launched in March 2023.

=== AI Accelerators ===
The Hailo-8L entry-level AI accelerators and Hailo-8 Century high-performance PCIe cards were launched in August 2023.

=== Generative AI Acceleration Modules ===
Hailo-10 is a Generative AI acceleration module for edge devices launched in 2024.

=== Software ===
The Hailo AI Software Suite allows deep learning models to be built and AI applications to be implemented. It includes a model zoo of pre-trained models that can be used by developers.

The Vision Processor Software Package, designed for Hailo-15, enables the development of AI vision applications.
