= Eitan Berglas =

Israeli economist and banker (1934-1992)

Eitan Berglas (Hebrew: איתן ברגלס; 28 June 1934 – August 8, 1992) was an Israeli economist and banker. He was chairman of Bank Hapoalim from 1985 to 1992.

Born in Tel Aviv, Berglas attended the Hebrew University of Jerusalem and then earned a master's and doctorate in economics from the University of Chicago.

Berglas helped found the economics department at Tel Aviv University in 1966. In 1992, shortly after Berglas' death, the university decided to expand the department into a separate school within the Faculty of Social Sciences, which was named in Berglas' honor.
