= Naftali Blumenthal =

Israeli politician (1922–2022)

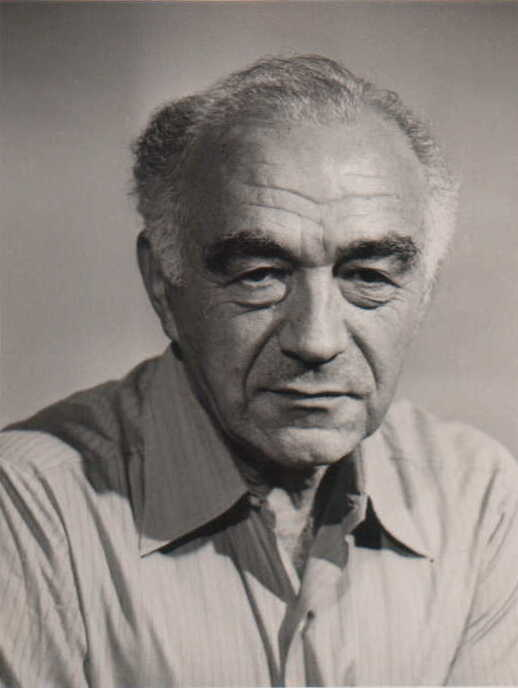
- Blumenthal in the 1980s

Faction represented in the Knesset
- 1981–1984: Alignment

Personal details
- Born: 1 March 1922; Stanisławów, Poland
- Died: 1 May 2022 (aged 100)

Naftali Blumenthal (Hebrew: נפתלי בלומנטל; 1 March 1922 – 1 May 2022) was an Israeli politician who served as a member of the Knesset for the Alignment from 1981 until 1984.

== Biography ==
Born in Stanisławów in Poland (now Ivano-Frankivsk in Ukraine), Blumenthal emigrated to Mandatory Palestine in 1934. He was a member of the Bnei Akiva youth movement and joined the Haganah at the age of 16. During the 1948 Arab–Israeli War he served as a company commander in the Carmeli Brigade and was later demobilised with the rank of captain. He worked as an accountant, and joined Solel Boneh in 1951. In 1958 he became comptroller of the Industrial Section at Koor Industries, in 1965 became head of the Finances Section, and from 1977 until 1982 served as its general director.

Having joined Mapai in 1950, Blumenthal became the party's treasurer. After it merged into the Labor Party in 1968 he became a member of the new party's central committee, bureau and socio-economic committee. In 1981 he was elected to the Knesset on the Alignment list, an alliance of the Labor Party and Mapam. He sat on the Finance Committee until losing his seat in the 1984 elections. In 1986 he became comptroller of the Histadrut.

Blumenthal died at the age of 100 on 1 May 2022.
