= Oded Eran =

Israeli diplomat (1941–2023)

- עודד ערן
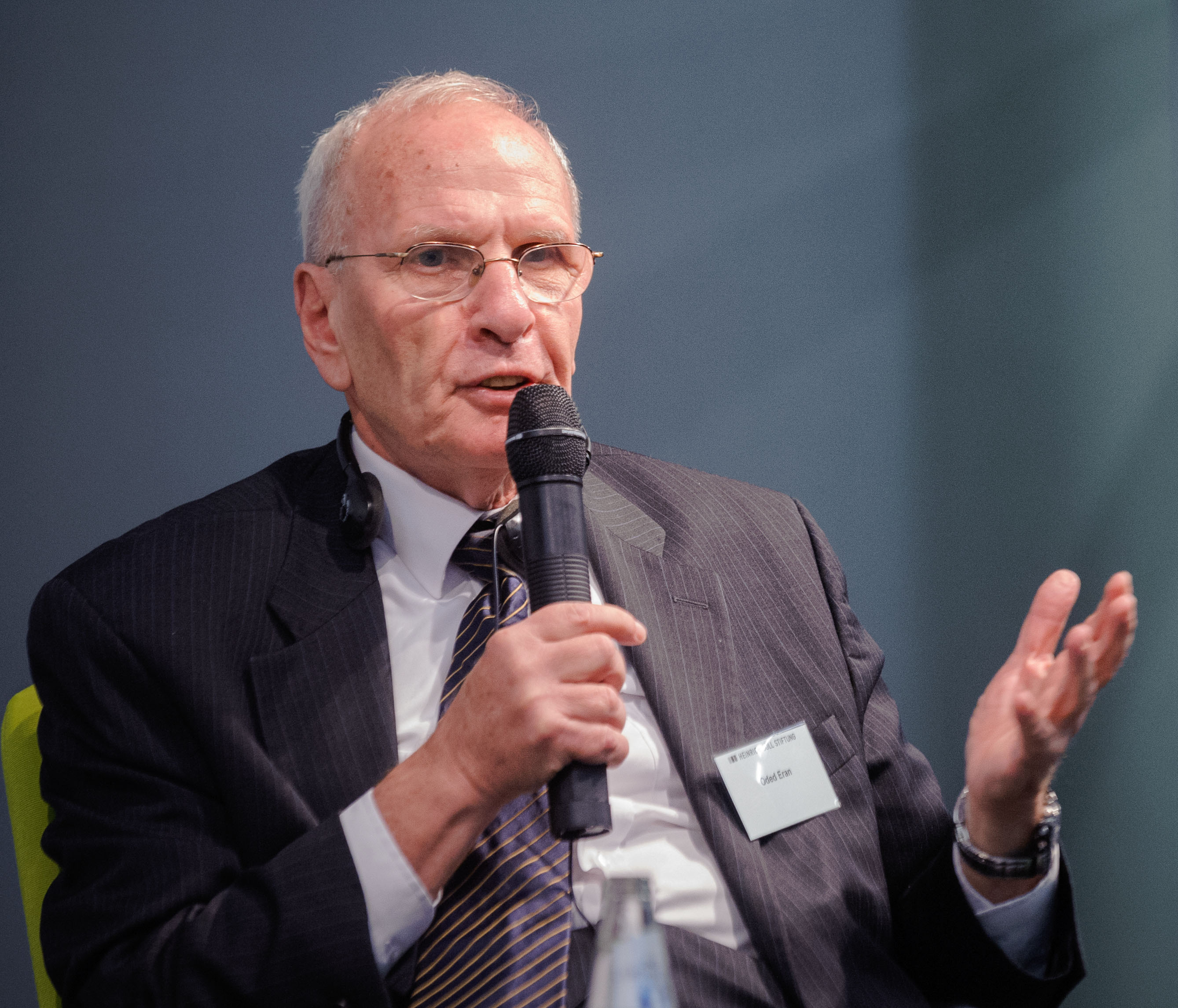
- Eran in 2012
- Born: 1941
- Died: 7 September 2023 (aged 82); Jerusalem, Israel

Oded Eran (Hebrew: עודד ערן; 1941 – 7 September 2023) was an Israeli diplomat and senior research fellow at the Israeli Institute for National Security Studies (INSS).

Eran served as the Chief executive officer of the Israeli office of the World Jewish Congress and served as an advisor to the subcommittee of the Knesset's Foreign Affairs and Defense Committee. He held a PhD from the London School of Economics.

From 1987 to 1990, Eran was an attaché at the Embassy of Israel in Washington, D.C. From 1997 to 2000, Eran served as Israel's ambassador to Jordan and from 1999 to 2000 he was the head of the negotiation team with the Palestinians. From 2002 to 2007 he served as Israel's ambassador to the European Union in Brussels. From July 2008 to November 2011, he served as head of INSS.

Eran died on 7 September 2023, at the age of 82. He was buried in Jerusalem the following day.
