= Zion Kenan =

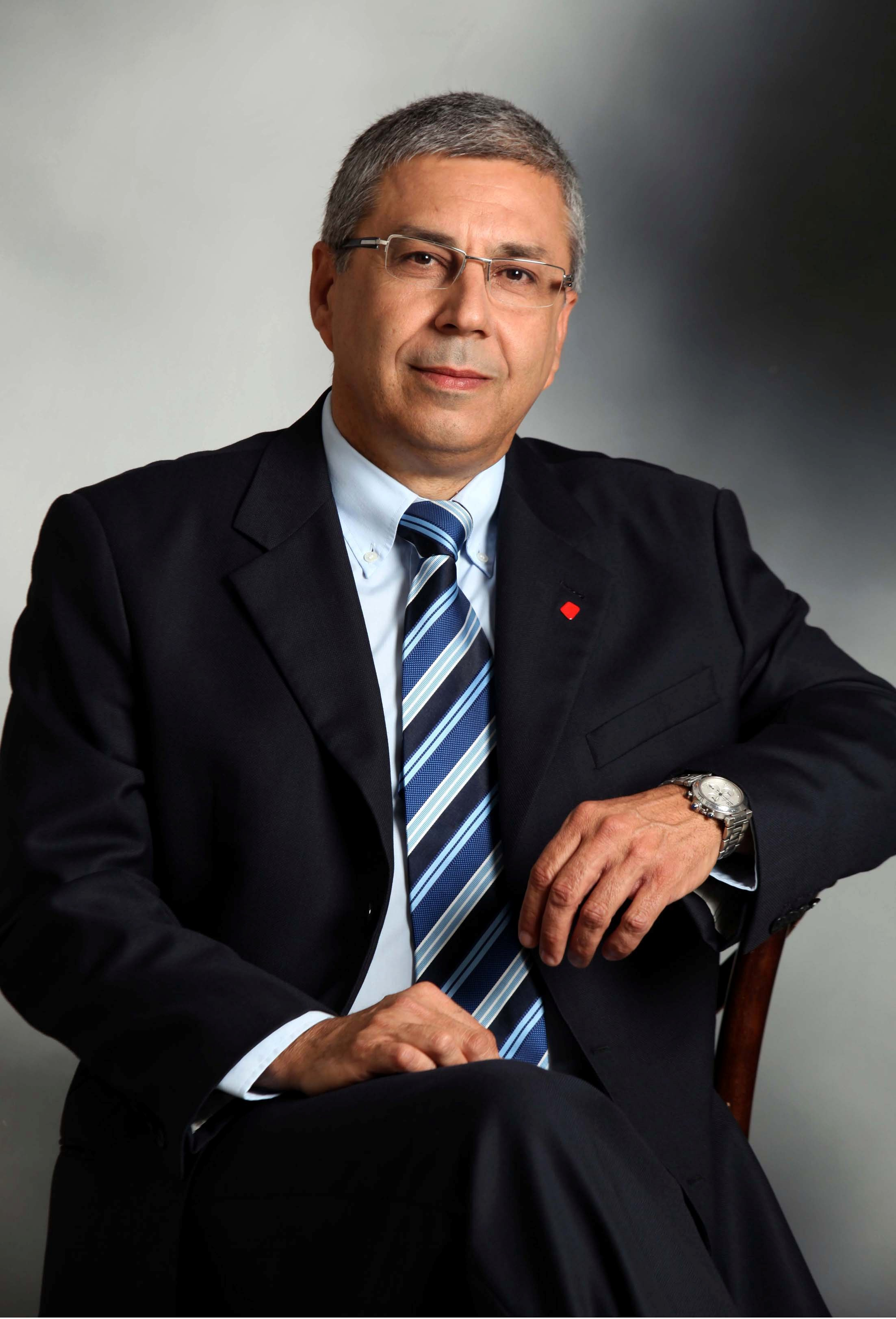
Former CEO of Bank Hapoalim

Zion Kenan (Hebrew: ציון קינן; born 1955) is the former chief executive officer of Bank Hapoalim in Israel. During his tenure, the bank focused on innovation and technology.
